= Chronological list of saints in the 6th century =

A list of people, who died during the 6th century, who have received recognition as Saints (through canonization) from the Catholic Church:

Name	Birth	Birthplace	Death	Place of death	Notes
Muiredach mac Echdach			unknown	Ireland, possibly Inishmurray	Bishop of Killala
Cellach of Killala			unknown	Ireland, possibly Lough Conn	Bishop of Killala
Ernán of Hinba		Ireland	uncertain date, late 6th century	Iona	uncle and companion of St Columba
Cormac Ua Liatháin		Ireland	uncertain date, late 6th century or 7th century		abbot
Columb the Smith			late 6th century	Ireland	blacksmith
Gerontius			501		Bishop of Cervia
Rusticus of Lyon			501		Bishop of Lyon
Eugenius of Carthage			505		
Vigilius			506		Bishop of Brescia
Aprus (Aper, Epvre, Evre)			507		Bishop of Toul
Ursus			508		Bishop of Auxerre
Brieuc (Brioc, Briocus, Briomaglus)	420		510		
Contentius			510		Bishop of Bayeux
Eugendus (Oyend)	449		510		
Marcellus			510		Bishop of Die
Pabo			510		
Bron			511		Bishop of Cassel-lrra
Maximus			511		Bishop of Pavia
Flavian			512		
Genevieve	422		512		
Angus MacNisse (Macanisius)			514		Bishop of Connor
Godardus			514		Bishop of Rouen
Symmachus			514		pope
Abran (Gibrian)			515		
Heraclius			515		Bishop of Sens
Maxentius	445		515		
Theodosius			516		Bishop of Auxerre
Beoadh (Aeodh)			518		Bishop of Ardcarne
Monennaa (Darerca of Killeevy)			518		
Conleth (Conlaed)			519		
Abban of Magheranoidhe			520		
Apollinaris of Valence	453		520		Bishop of Vienne
Aventinus			520		Bishop of Chartres
Constantius			520		Bishop of Aquino
Emilian of Vercelli			520		Bishop of Vercelli
Enodoch			520		
Maximinus (Mesmin)			520		
Terence			520		Bishop of Metz
Ennodius	473		521		Bishop of Pavia
Verecundus			522		Bishop of Verona
Arethas and Companions			523		
Hormisdas			523		pope
Severinus Boethius	480		524		
Sigismund of Burgundy			524		
Viventiolus, Archbishop of Lyons			524		
Avitus			525		Bishop of Vienne
Brigit of Kildare	435		525		
Camelian			525		Bishop of Troyes
Deodatus of Blois			525		
Vitonus (Vanne, Vaune)			525		Bishop of Verdun
Ailbe (Ailbhe, Albeus)			526		Bishop of Emily
Florentius of Orange			526		Bishop of Orange
John I			526		pope
Justus			527		Bishop of Urgel
Quintian			527		Bishop of Clermont
Turibius of Palencia			528		
Theodosius the Cenobiarch	423		529		
Ciarán of Saigir (Kevin the Elder)			530		Bishop of Ossory
Dositheus of Gaza			530		
Remigius (Remi)	437		530		Bishop of Reims
Samson of Constantinople (Samson Xenodochius ("the Hospitable"))			530		
Severus of Treves			530		
Valens			531		Bishop of Verona
Ecclesius			532		Bishop of Ravenna
Eleutherius of Tournai			532		Bishop of Tournai
Sabbas	439		532		
Fulgentius of Ruspe	468		533		Bishop of Ruspe
Theodoric of Mont d’Or (Thierry)			533		
Trojanus of Saintes (Trojan, Troyen)			533		Bishop of Saintes
Donatus of Provence			535		
Hilary of Mende			535		Bishop of Mende
Melaine			535		Bishop of Rennes
Mochta			535		Bishop of Ireland
Victor of Vita			535		Bishop of Vita
Agapitus I			536		pope
Carilefus (Calais)			536		
Pomponius			536		Bishop of Naples
Titan			536		Bishop of Brescia
Fortunatus of Todi			537		Bishop of Todi
Vigor			537		Bishop of Bayeux
Aventine of Troyes			538		
Silverius			538		pope
Gregory of Langres			539		Bishop of Langres
Vedast (Vaast)			539		Bishop of Arras
Carthach			540		
David of Thessalonica			540		
Jarlath	445		540		Bishop of Tuam
Justin of Chieti			540		
Lupus of Soissons			540		Bishop of Soissons
Romanus the Melodist			540		
Gallicanus II			541		Bishop of Embrun
Leo of Sens			541		Bishop of Sens
Leontius the Elder			541		Bishop of Bordeaux
Placidus			541		
Caesarius of Arles	470		542		Bishop of Arles
Lupus of Lyons			542		Archbishop of Lyons
Barsanuphius		Egypt	543	Monastery of Seridus, Gaza	
Firminus			543		Bishop of Uzès
John the Prophet			543	Monastery of Seridus, Gaza	
Scholastica	480		543		
John of Reomay	444		544		
Ciarán of Clonmacnoise	516	County Roscommon	544	Clonmacnoise	Abbot of Clonmacnoise
Venantius of Viviers	490		544		Bishop of Viviers
Clotilda			545		
Medardus			545		Bishop of Vermandois
Paulinus of Brescia			545		Bishop of Brescia
Cyprian of Toulon	476		546		Bishop of Toulon
Lawrence Majoranus			546		Bishop of Siponto
Vincent			546		Bishop of Troyes
Benedict of Nursia	480		547		
Odhran (Oran, Otteran)			548		
Licerius (Lizier)			548		Bishop of Couserans
Aecadius			549		Bishop of Bourges
Albinus (Aubin)			549		Bishop of Angers
Finnian of Clonard			549		
Herculanus			549		Bishop of Perugia
Melan			549		Bishop of Viviers
Tigernach of Clones (Tierney, Tierry)			549		Bishop of Clogher
Benedict of Campania (Benedict the Hermit)			550		
Desideratus			550		Bishop of Bourges
Dubricius (Devereux, Dubric, Dyfrig)			550		
Emiliana			550		
Galla			550	Rome	
Isaac of Spoleto			550		
Leo of Troyes			550		
Modomnoc (Domnoc, Dominic)			550		
Optatian			550		Bishop of Brescia
Pastor			550		Bishop of Orléans
Paternus (Padarn)	490		550		
Romanus of Subiaco			550		
Severinus			550		Bishop of Septempeda
Theodore of Bologna			550		Bishop of Bologna
Triverius			550		
Gall	486		551		Bishop of Clermont
Sacerdos (Sardot, Serdon)			551		Bishop of Lyon
Datius			552		
Mennas (Menas)			552		
Anastasius IX			553		Bishop of Terni
Laetus			553		
Theodosius			554		Bishop of Vaison
Victor			554		Bishop of Capua
Vincent of Leon			554		
Elesbaan			555		
Marius (Maurus or May)			555		
Bandaridus (Banderik, Bandarinus, Bandery)			556		Bishop of Soissons
Kieran the Younger (Ciaran)			556		
Leobinus (Lubin)			556		Bishop of Chartres
Maximianus of Ravenna			556		Bishop of Ravenna
Cassius of Narni			558		Bishop of Narni
Hilary of Galeata			558		
John the Silent	454		558		Bishop of Colonia
Marculf (Marcoul)			558		
Victorian of Asan			558		
Christine			559		
Leonard of Noblac			559		
Martyrs of North Africa			559		
Almirus			560		
Aspasius of Auch			560		Bishop of Eauze
Clodoald (Cloud)	522		560		
Domitian			560		Bishop of Maastricht
Dorotheus of Gaza	500		560		
Equitius			560		
Finian Lobhar			560		
Fridolin			560		
Germerius (Germier)	480		560		Bishop of Toulouse
Himerius			560		Bishop of Amelia
Kessog (Mackessag)			560		Bishop of Scotland
Sacerdos of Saguntum			560		Bishop of Saguntum
Saint Senan of Inis Cathaig	488		560		Bishop of Iniscathay
Eleutherius			561		Bishop of Auxerre
Salvinus			562		Bishop of Verona
Scannal			563		
Abundius			564		
Paternus (Pair)	481		564		Bishop of Avranches
Pient			564		
Tudwal (Pabu, Tugdual)			564		Bishop of Treher
Leontius the Younger			565		Bishop of Bordeaux
Samson of Dol	485		565		Bishop of Dol
Bandry (Bandarid)			566		
Nicetius			566		Bishop of Trier
Sabinus of Canosa			566		Bishop of Canosa
Auxanus (Ansano)			568		Bishop of Milan
Lauto (Laudo, Laudus, Lo)			568		Bishop of Constance
Villicus			568		Bishop of Metz
Desideratus			569		
Fortunatus ("the Philosopher")			569		
Anastasius X			570		
Armagillus (Armel, Ermel, Ervan)			570		
Constantian (Constantianus)			570		
Fidelis			570		Bishop of Mérida
Gildas the Wise			570		
Honoratus			570		Bishop of Milan
Ita (Ida)			570		
Leonard of Vandoeuvre			570		
Leonianus			570		
Monegundis			570		
Quintius (Quintin)			570		
Sedna			570		Bishop of Ossory
Moloc (Luan, Lugaidh, Molvanus, Molluog, Murlach)			572		
Sylvia			572		
Tetricus			572		Bishop of Langres
Brendan of Birr			573		
Calétric of Chartres			573		Bishop of Chartres
Eufronius			573		Bishop of Tours
Paul Aurelian			573		Bishop of León
Emilian of Cogolla	474		574		
Rusticus			574		Bishop of Trier
Calupan			575		
Goar	495		575		
Maglorius (Maelor)			575		
Theodore (Chef, Theudar, Theuderius)			575		
Anastasia the Patrician			576		
Germanus (Germain)	469		576		Bishop of Paris
Lawrence the Illuminator			576		Bishop of Spoleto
Senoch	536		576		
Aldate			577		Bishop of Gloucester
Friard	511		577		
Patroclus	497		577		
Brendan the Navigator	486		578		
Philip			578		Bishop of Vienne
Martyrs of Campania			579		
Quinidius			579		Bishop of Vaison
Agricola	497		580		Bishop of Chalon-sur-Saône
Baldegundis			580		
Dalmatius			580		Bishop of Rodez
Droctoveus (Droctonius, Drotte)			580		
Elaphius			580		Bishop of Châlons-sur-Marne
Felix of Bourges			580		
Suranus			580	Sora, Lazio	Abbot
Liberata and Faustina			580		
Maurilius			580		Bishop of Cahors
Sequanus (Seine)			580		
Domnolus			581		Bishop of Le Mans
Eparchius (Cybard)			581		
Ferreolus			581		Bishop of Uzès
Tharsilla			581		
Eutychius of Constantinople	512	Theium, Phrygia	582	Constantinople	Patriarch of Constantinople
Bonitus			582		
Leobardus			583		
Deiniol (Desiniol, Daniel)			584		Bishop of Bangor Fawr
Dulcardus			584		
Maculphe			584		Bishop of Senlis
Felix of Nantes			584		Bishop of Nantes
Maurus			584		
Ruadan of Lothra			584		
Salvius (Sauve)			584		Bishop of Albi
Hermenegild			585		
Leudomer (Lomer)			585		Bishop of Chartres
Ursicinus			585		Bishop of Cahors
Saint Agnes of Poitiers			586		
Candida the Younger	536		586		
Cyprian			586		
Daig Maccairaill (Dagaeus, Daganus)			586		
Praetextatus (Prix)			586		Bishop of Rouen
Redemptus			586		Bishop of Ferentini
Junian of Mairé			587		
Radegunde	518		587		
Romphar			587		
Abraham the Great of Kaskhar	492		588		Bishop of Kratia
Agericus of Verdun (Airy, Algeric)	521		588		Bishop of Verdun
Bodagisl			588		
Frediano (Frigidian, Frigidanus)			588		Bishop of Lucca
Aedh MacBricc			589		
Finnian (Finian, Winin)	495	possibly Ulster	589		
David (Dewi)			589		Bishop of Wales
Alexander			590		Bishop of Fiesole
Connat			590		
Ebregislus (Evergislus)			590		Bishop of Cologne
Fachanan (Fachtna)			590		Bishop of Ross
Joseph Abibos			590		
Palladius			590		Bishop of Saintes
Quadragesimus			590		
Servulus of Rome			590		
Veranus of Cavaillon	513		590		Bishop of Cavaillon
Ferreolus			591		Bishop of Limoges
Sulpitius I of Bourges			591		
Yrieix (Aredius)			591		
Guntramnus			592		
Simeon Stylites the Younger	512		592		
Saint Silvia			592		
Lomer			593		
Marius	530		594		Bishop of Avenches
Maximian			594		Bishop of Syracuse
Agnellus			596		
Ebrulf (Evroult)			596		
Leander of Seville	534		596		Bishop of Seville
Columba (Columbcille)	521		597		
Baithin			598		
Dallan Forgaill	530		598		
Anastasius XI			599		
Amantius			600		
Asaph (Asa)			600		Bishop of Asaph
Avitus of Clermont			600		Bishop of Clermont
Canice (Cainnech, Kenneth)			600		
Fulk			600		
Honoratus of Amiens			600		Bishop of Amiens
Liudhard (Liphard, Letard)			600		
Maurus			600		Bishop of Verona
Oncho (Onchuo)			600		
Peregrinus (Cetteus)			600		Bishop of Amiternum
Baithéne mac Brénaind	536	Ireland	600	Ireland	Abbot
Tarsicia			600		

== See also ==
- Christianity in the 6th century
- List of Church Fathers
