= Aspasius of Auch =

6th-century Christian saint

Aspasius of Auch (/æˈspeɪʒiəs, æˈspeɪziəs, æˈspeɪʒəs/; also Aspasius of Éauze; died 560) was a Christian leader of the 6th century canonized as a saint.

== History ==
Aspasius was from Gascony, but left due to the invasion by the Goths. He was sent by Bishop Lupus of Sens to the region of Brie to proclaim the Christian faith. Aspasius served as the Bishop of Éauze (modern-day Auch, France). He participated in the Second, Third, and Fifth Councils of Orléans in 533, 541, and 549, and also held a provincial council in 551.

He is traditionally venerated in the French towns of Meaux and Melun. His feast day is January 2.

St. Aspasius is the patron saint of Melun.
