= List of people from Liège =

This is a list of notable people from Liège, who were either born in Liège, or spent part of their life there.

== People born in Liège ==
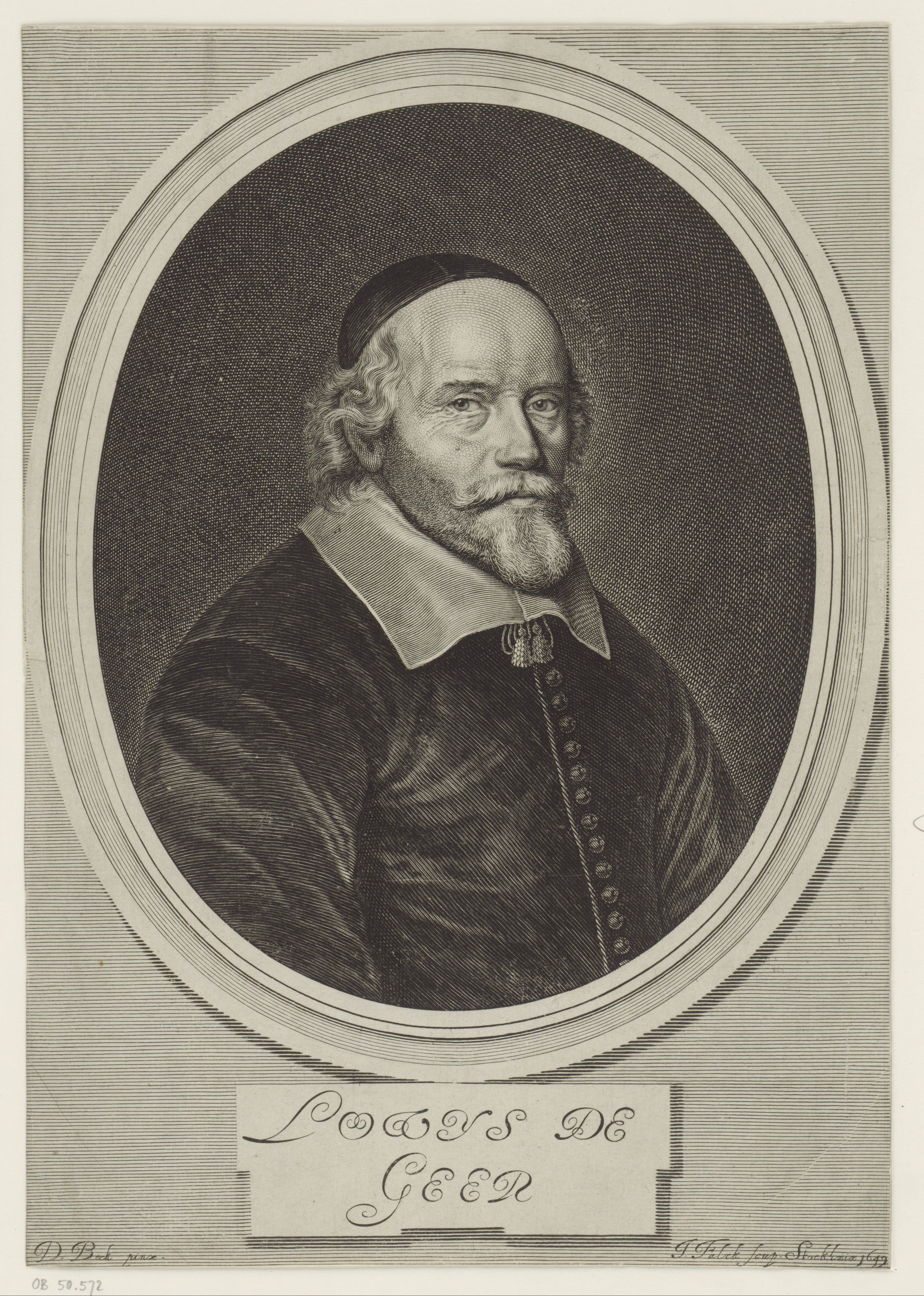
Louis De Geer, in an engraving by Jeremias Falck, 1649

=== Before the 19th century ===
- Saint Bavo, saint (6th century)
- The Carolingian dynasty originated in the Liège region
  - Charles Martel Mayor of the Palace of the Frankish court.
  - Pippin the Younger (in French: Pépin le Bref), King of the Franks (born in Jupille, 8th century)
  - Charlemagne, King of the Franks, then crowned emperor (birth in Liège uncertain, 8th century)
- Alger of Liège, learned priest (11th century)
- William of St-Thierry, theologian and mystic (11th century)
- Juliana of Liège, nun and visionary (12th century)
- Lambert le Bègue, priest and reformer (12th century)
- Jacob of Liège, musician (13th century)
- Peter Plaoul (1353–1415), bishop, scholastic philosopher and theologian
- Johannes Ciconia, composer and theorist (14th century)
- Jean d'Outremeuse, writer and historian (14th century)
- Jacques Arcadelt, composer (16th century)
- Johann Theodor de Bry, engraver, draftsman, book editor and publisher (16th century)
- Louis De Geer, merchant and industrialist (16th century)
- Lambert Lombard, architect (16th century)
- Matheo Romero, composer (16th century)
- Jean-Guillaume Carlier, Flemish painter (1639-1676)
- Gérard de Lairesse, painter (1640–1711)
- Henri-Guillaume Hamal (1685-1752), musician and composer
- André-Joseph Blavier, composer and choirmaster of Antwerp Cathedral (1717–1782)
- André Ernest Modeste Grétry, composer (1741–1813)
- Charlotte Stuart, Duchess of Albany (1753–1789)
- Jean-Jacques Dony, inventor and industrialist (1759–1819)
- Florimond Claude, Comte de Mercy-Argenteau, diplomat (1727–1794)
- Gilles-François Closson, painter (1796–1842)

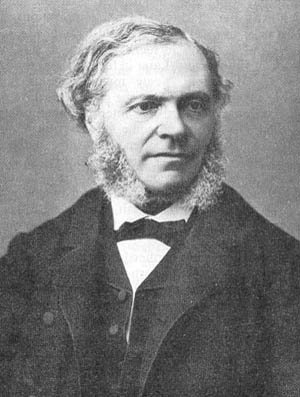
César Franck

=== 19th century ===
- Noël Delfosse, lawyer, politician (1801–1858)
- André Dumont, geologist (1809–1857)
- Joseph Massart, violinist (1811–1892)
- Hubert Joseph Walther Frère-Orban, statesman (1812–1896)
- Gustave de Molinari, economist and political philosopher (1819–1912)
- Heinrich Joseph Dominicus Denzinger, theologian and author (1819–1883)
- Hubert Léonard, violinist (1819–1890)
- César Franck, composer (1822–1890)
- Caroline Samuel, composer (1822-1851)
- Florent Joseph Marie Willems, painter (1823–1905)
- Adolphe Samuel, composer (1824-1898)
- Zénobe Gramme, inventor (1826–1901)
- Ernest Candèze, doctor and entomologist (1827–1898)
- Georges Montefiore-Levi, inventor and philanthropist (1832–1906)
- Émile Banning (1836–1898), civil servant
- Georges Nagelmackers, founder of the Compagnie Internationale des Wagons-Lits (1845–1905)
- Martin Pierre Marsick, violinist (1847 in Jupille-sur-Meuse—1924)
- Constantin Le Paige, mathematician (1852–1929)
- Gustave Serrurier-Bovy, architect and furniture designer (1858–1910)
- Eugène Ysaÿe, composer and violinist (1858–1931)
- Armand Rassenfosse, painter and lithographer (1862–1934)
- Joseph Jongen, organist, composer, and educator (1873–1953)
- Henri Gagnebin, composer (1886–1977)

=== 20th century ===
- Albert Van den Berg (resistant), doctor of law, resistance, saved Jews in WW2 (1890–1945)
- Edouard Zeckendorf, doctor, army officer, and mathematician (1901–1983)
- Jean Rey, lawyer and politician (1902–1983)
- Georges Simenon, novelist (1903–1989)
- Fanny Thibout, dancer and folklorist (1907–1998)
- Arthur Haulot, journalist, humanist, and poet (born in Angleur, 1913–2005)
- Eddy Paape, cartoonist (born in Grivegnée, 1920)
- Jean-Michel Charlier, writer of comic books and novels (1924–1989)
- Jean-Claude Lorquet, chemist and professor (born 1935)
- Axel Hervelle, Real Madrid basketball player (born 1983)
- Hermann Huppen, comic book artist (born 1938)
- Violetta Villas, singer and actress (1938–2011)
- Jacques Hustin, singer-songwriter (1940–2009)
- Bernard Gheur, journalist, writer (born 1945)
- Noël Godin, writer, critic, actor and notorious cream pie flinger (born 1945)
- Jean-Marie Klinkenberg, writer, critic, linguist and semioticians (born 1944)
- Elmore D, musician (born 1946)
- Patrick Nève, Formula One driver (born 1949)
- Jean-Pierre Dardenne and Luc Dardenne, filmmakers (born 1951 and 1954, resp.)
- Didier Reynders, politician (born 1958)
- Armand Eloi, actor and director (born 1962)
- Jean-Michel Saive, table tennis player (born 1969)
- Isabelle Wéry, actress
- Ethel Houbiers, voice actress (born 1973)
- Marie Gillain, actress (born 1975)
- Justine Henin, tennis player (born 1982)
- Jonatan Cerrada, singer (winner of A La Recherche De La Nouvelle Star) (born 1985)
- Françoise Taylor (née Wauters), artist (1920 - 2007)

== People associated with Liège ==
=== Before the 19th century ===
- Saint Lambert, martyr (7th century)
- Saint Hubert, first bishop of Liège (7th century)
- Agilfride, bishop (8th century)
- Ratherius, bishop (10th century)
- Notger, first prince-bishop of Liège (10th century)
- Conrad of Urach, canon of the cathedral of Liège (12th century)
- Thomas of Cantimpré, writer, preacher, and theologian (13th century)
- Pope Urban IV, archdeacon (13th century)
- Engelbert III von der Marck, bishop (14th century)
- John Mandeville, naturalist, philosopher, and astrologer (14th century)
- Johannes Brassart, composer at the church of St Jean l'Evangeliste (15th century)
- William de la Marck, political character of the Prince-Bishopric of Liège (15th century)
- Ernest of Bavaria, bishop (16th century)
- Macropedius, humanist and headmaster of St Jerome (16th century)
- Rinaldo del Mel, composer (16th century)
- Johannes Sleidanus, historian (16th century)
- Ferdinand of Bavaria, bishop (17th century)
- François Walther de Sluze, mathematician and canon (17th century)
- Peter Wright, martyr and priest (17th century)
- Clementina Walkinshaw, mistress of Prince Charles Edward Stuart (18th century)
- François-Xavier de Feller, author and professor (18th century)

=== 19th century ===
- Eugène Charles Catalan, mathematician, taught at the University of Liège
- Etienne Constantin, Baron de Gerlache, politician and historian
- Laurent-Guillaume de Koninck, paleontologist and chemist, taught at the University of Liège
- Philippe Auguste Hennequin, painter, pupil of David
- Godefroid Kurth, historian, taught at the University of Liège
- Jean Théodore Lacordaire, entomologist, taught at the University of Liège
- Joseph Lebeau, statesman and newspaper founder
- Antoine Joseph Wiertz, painter

=== 20th century ===
- André Cools, politician, assassinated in Liège in 1991
- Mathieu Crickboom, violinist and main disciple of Eugène Ysaÿe
- Lucien Godeaux, one of the most published mathematicians
- Pierre Harmel, lawyer, politician, and diplomat, taught at the University of Liège
- Gary Hartstein, associate professor of medicine at the University of Liège
- Steve Houben, jazz saxophonist and flutist, created the jazz seminar at the Conservatoire Royal de Musique de Liège
- Jacques Ochs (1883–1971), artist and Olympic fencing champion
- Henri Pousseur, composer, taught at the University of Liège and at the Conservatoire Royal de Musique de Liège
- Frederic Rzewski, composer and virtuoso pianist, taught at the Conservatoire Royal de Musique de Liège
- Matthieu Verstraete, physicist, taught at the University of Liège
