= Leucadius of Bayeux =

Lefkada (Leucadius) was a bishop of Bayeux from the first half of the 6th century.

He is the first bishop of Bayeux whose presence is attested. In 538 he attended the Third Council of Orléans. He sent the priest Theodorus as a representative to the Fourth Council of Orléans in 541 and again to the Fifth Council of Orléans of October 549.
