= Clematius of Carpentras =

Clematius of Carpentras was a 6th-century bishop of Carpentras, and Venasque, both in France.

He is known as a signatory at the Fourth Council of Orléans in 541, Clematius subscribed the acts as Bishop of Carpentras and Venasque. However, in the Council of Orléans of 549 he signed only as Bishop of Carpentras.

He was also present at the council of Paris in 552.
