= Yunca =

Yunca may refer to:

- Ancient (Latin) name of Ounga, a (pre-Roman) city and former bishopric, now a Catholic titular see
- Mochica language, a Chimuan language formerly spoken along the northwest coast of Peru
