= Gille Na Naomh M'Arthur O'Bruin =

Gille Na Naomh M'Arthur O'Bruin (died 1234) was an Irish priest (of Archdeacon of Roscommon) in the 13th century.
