= Council of Orléans (621) =

The Council of Orléans 621 was a council of Roman Catholic Church bishops, held in 621 in the city of Orléans, France.

== See also ==
- Council of Orléans
