= Siadhail =

Irish abbot

Siadhail (d 813) was Abbot and possibly Bishop of Roscommon in the 9th century:
