= Bishop of Ardcarne =

Bishop of Ardcarne was the ordinary of the Pre-Reformation Irish Catholic episcopal see based at Ardcarn, County Roscommon, Ireland. The only known incumbent was Beaidh. Four Archdeacons are also known of. Another priest, Denis O'Mulkyran was wrongly ascribed in some lists, but was an Archdeacon.
