= Tetricus of Langres =

Tetricus of Langres (died 572/73) was Bishop of Langres from 539/40 until his death.

Tetricus came from a noble Gallo-Roman senatorial family, his father was Gregory of Langres. Tetricus was one of his three sons and the only one known by name. He succeeded his father 539/40 as Bishop of Langres and is said to have held this office for 33 years Like his father, he resided chiefly in Dijon. Tetricus participated in the Fifth Council of Orléans (549) and the Council of Paris (552).

According to Gregory of Tours, who was a later relative of Tetricus, the Merovingian king Chilperic I had a dream in which Tetricus, along with Agricola of Chalon-sur-Saône and Nicetius of Lyon appeared to the king.
