= Jean-François de Chamillart =

French churchman

Jean-François de Chamillart (1657 – 15 April 1714) was a French churchman. The brother of the contrôleur général des finances Michel de Chamillart, Jean-François served as the abbot of the Fontgombault Abbey, and of Baume-les-Messieurs Abbey, as count and bishop of Dol (1692-1702), and then as bishop of Senlis (1702–14).

Chamillart was born and died in Paris. He earned a doctorate in theology from the Sorbonne. First almoner to Marie-Adélaïde of Savoy, duchess of Burgundy, he was elected a member of the Académie française on 5 January 1702, replacing François Charpentier. He was received into the Académie on 7 September 1702 by abbot Gallois, a reception in which his nieces assisted, to entertain themselves at his expense - they sat at a tribune in what was the beginning of women being admitted to the Académie's public sittings (though Chamillart rarely came to the Académie himself despite his seat on it).

Little is known of his life - D'Alembert thought him "most estimable for the probity that made his administration happy" and that Chamillart was surprised at the number of the prelates sitting in the Académie "which must essentially be a society of letters" and "must not end up being a [church] council."
