= Liudhard medalet =

6th-century Anglo-Saxon gold object from England

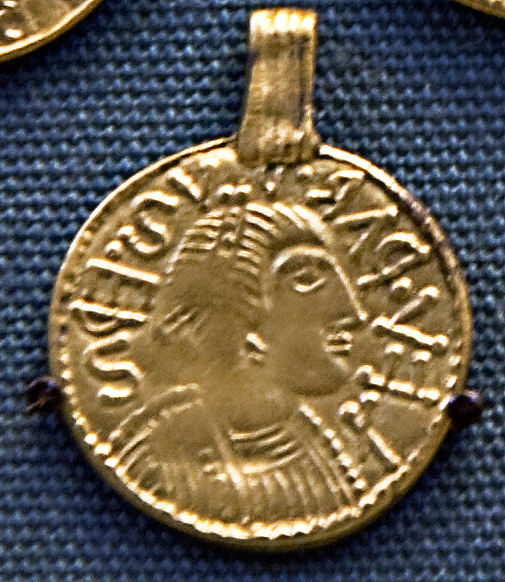
- Replica of the Liudhard medalet from the British Museum
- Material: Gold
- Size: 1.57 grams (0.055 oz)
- Writing: Latin inscription
- Created: late 6th century AD
- Discovered: 1840s
- Present location: currently in the World Museum Liverpool
- Identification: M7018 at the World Museum Liverpool

The Liudhard medalet is a gold Anglo-Saxon coin or small medal found sometime before 1844 near St Martin's Church in Canterbury, England. It was part of the Canterbury-St Martin's hoard of six items. The coin, along with other items found with it, now resides in the World Museum in Liverpool. Although some scholarly debate exists on whether or not all the items in the hoard were from the same grave, most historians who have studied the object conclude that they were buried together as a necklace in a 6th-century woman's grave. The coin is set in a mount so that it could be worn as jewellery, and has an inscription on the obverse or front surrounding a robed figure. The inscription refers to Liudhard, a Frankish bishop who accompanied Bertha from Francia to England when she married Æthelberht, the king of Kent. The reverse side of the coin has a double-barred cross, or patriarchal cross, with more lettering.

The coin was probably struck at Canterbury in the late 6th century, most likely between 578 and 589. Although it could have been used as a coin, it was more likely made as a medallion to proclaim the wearer's conversion to Christianity. The coin is the oldest surviving example of Anglo-Saxon coinage. The design of the figured side has some affinities with Merovingian and Visigothic coins, but the side with the cross has few known predecessors in coinage and is the first northern European depiction of a patriarchal cross in any medium.

== Discovery and ownership ==
The medalet was first revealed to the public on 25 April 1844 by Charles Roach Smith, who presented it, along with other coins found with it, to a meeting of the Numismatic Society. The medalet, along with two other similar items, had been acquired by W. H. Rolfe, who later acquired five other items from the same hoard, and all eight items were published in the Society's Numismatic Chronicle in 1845. (Note: It can be viewed at The Numismatic Chronicle and Journal of the Royal Numismatic Society, volume VII, pp. 186–191) About the origins and circumstances of the finding of the hoard, Smith only knew that they had been found "a few years since", and that all of the items had been found together. There may have been further items that were found but not preserved. All of the items were found in the churchyard of St Martin's in the east of Canterbury according to Rolfe, although the first published account stated that it was found next door at St Augustine's Abbey instead of St Martin's.

The whole collection, including the medalet, passed from Rolfe's collection to the collection of Joseph Mayer, and then passed to the Rolfe-Mayer collection in the City of Liverpool Public Museums. This now forms part of the World Museum Liverpool.

S. C. Hawkes argues that the eight items in the hoard were found in different graves, basing this on x-ray and fluorescent analysis of the coins. However, the historian Philip Grierson thought that the possibility of two graves from different time periods both containing coins of the same period was so small as to make the likelihood of the hoard coming from two graves slim.

The medalet is part of the only late-6th or early-7th-century find of gold jewellery in a grave in a churchyard. All of the coins in the hoard were probably part of a necklace that was buried in a woman's grave. The medalet itself is the earliest surviving Anglo-Saxon coin.

== Description ==
The medalet itself is a gold coin, set in a loop mount so that it could be worn as jewellery. On the obverse side is a bust of a man wearing a diadem and a robe, with a border of dots around the edge. Written on this side is the legend "LEV·DΛR·~VS·EPS". The inscription runs backward from right to left. The letters are also inscribed backward. Both the initial "L" and terminal "S" of "LEUDARDUS" (the Latinate form of the Germanic name "Liudhard") are to some degree shifted sideways on their axes, perhaps to conveniently demarcate between words. The second grouping, "EPS" (also with identical sideways terminal "S"), is a standard abbreviation for the ecclesiastical Latin word EPiscopuS which means bishop.

On the reverse side of the coin appears a patriarchal cross set on a base with two pendants descending from the upper arm of the cross. A circle and two half-circles intersect at the cross. Above the cross, upside down, are the letters "AA". The cross is flanked by two inscriptions, each one reading "NINΛ". Under the cross are the letters "VΛV". The whole medalet weighs 1.57 grams (0.055 oz).

Smith felt that the legend on the obverse named a 6th-century bishop of Autun, but D. B. Haigh as well as C. H. V. Sutherland, Arthur Evans, and G. C. Brooke all felt that it referred to Liudhard, a Frankish bishop who accompanied the Frankish princess Bertha to the Kingdom of Kent in the late 6th century when the Christian Bertha married the then pagan King Æthelberht of Kent. Liudhard died probably in the late 590s.

== Origins and similarities to other coins ==
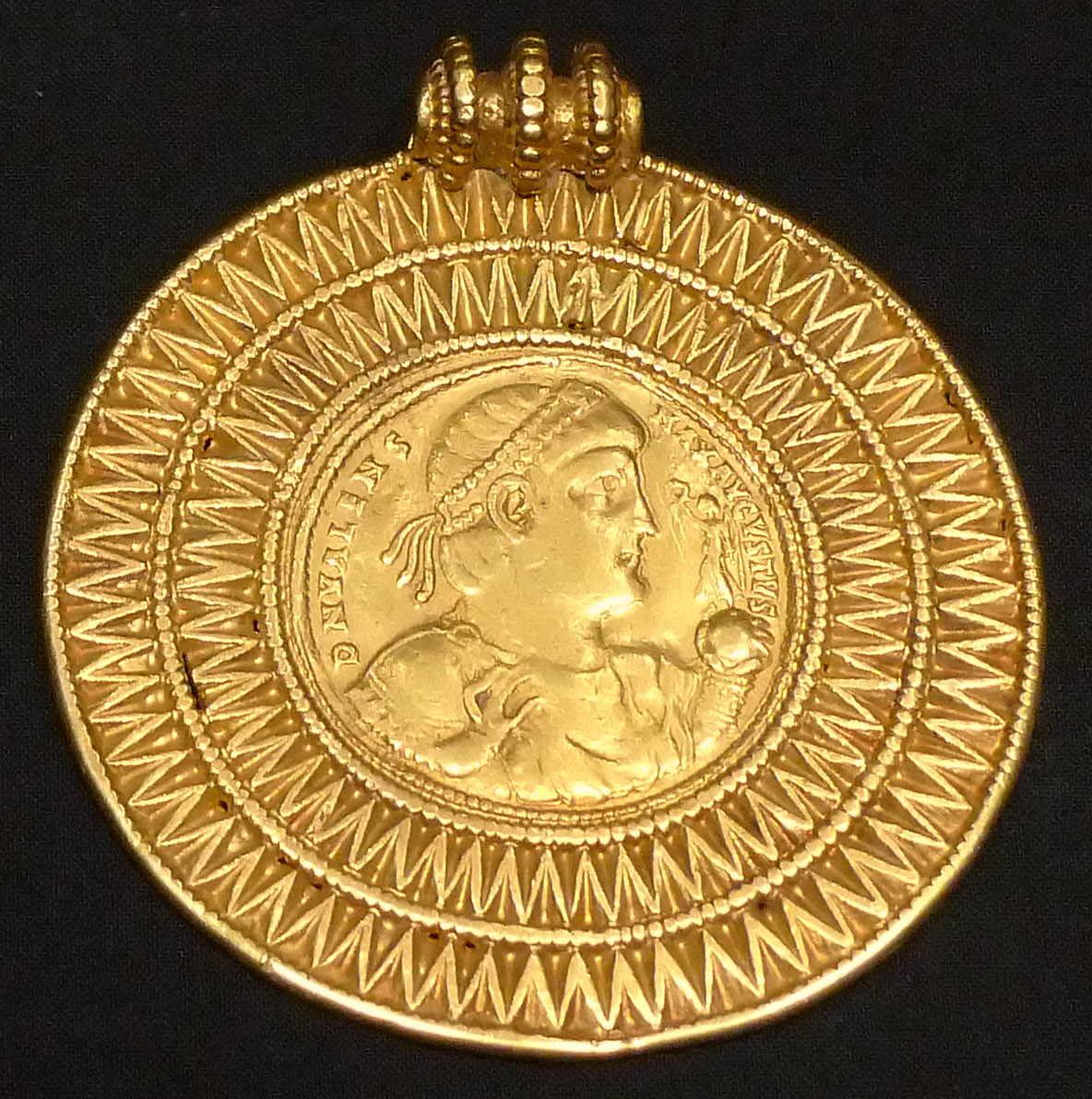
Medal of the Emperor Valens (r. 364-78)

The coin that formed the base of the medalet was most likely minted in England, probably at Canterbury. Evans felt that it was produced by a Frankish member of Liudhard's household, but Grierson was less sure of it being produced by a Frank. Both, however, concluded that it was not really meant to be used as money, but was rather struck for use as a medallion showing conversion to Christianity. The historian Margaret Deanesly argued that it was made at Canterbury, by a native Jutish artisan. Given the dates of Æthelberht's reign, it appears likely that the coin was struck between 578 and 589. The loop for suspension is a feature of bracteates, pagan Germanic quasi-coins apparently made as amulets or jewellery, and often featuring a king. However, bracteates are only stamped on one side.

The obverse is similar to coins from Merovingian France, especially from the southern parts, as well as showing influences from Visigothic Spain. The reverse side, however, has no known predecessors in Merovingian or Visigothic coinage. Although by the late 6th century, Merovingian and Visigothic kings were putting their names on their coins, no surviving coins from either kingdom name a bishop. The design of the figure is derived from Byzantine imperial coins, and the cross itself is large and closely resembles an altar cross.

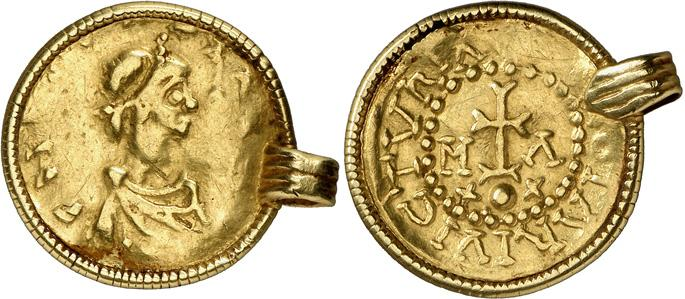
A contemporary Frankish gold solidus of Clotaire II, who was a king for his whole life, 584 – 629, mounted as a pendant.

The patriarchal, or double-barred cross had become a common symbol for the True Cross by the time of the striking of the medalet. The historian Martin Werner argues that the form of the cross on the reverse, with the pendants, is set to resemble the crux gemmata, or jewelled cross, set up in the 4th or 5th century at what was believed to be the site of Golgotha inside the Church of the Holy Sepulchre in Jerusalem. Werner further speculates that the base of the cross on the medalet is meant to symbolize the hill at Golgotha. The circle crossing over the cross on the reverse is an early form of a cross that later appears in conjunction with the hetoimasia or "empty throne" motif in Byzantine art.

The medalet is the first northern European artistic work to display a patriarchal cross, and it is also the first securely datable item to use the circle crossing a cross.
