= St Martin's Church, Canterbury =

Church in Kent, England

Church of St Martin
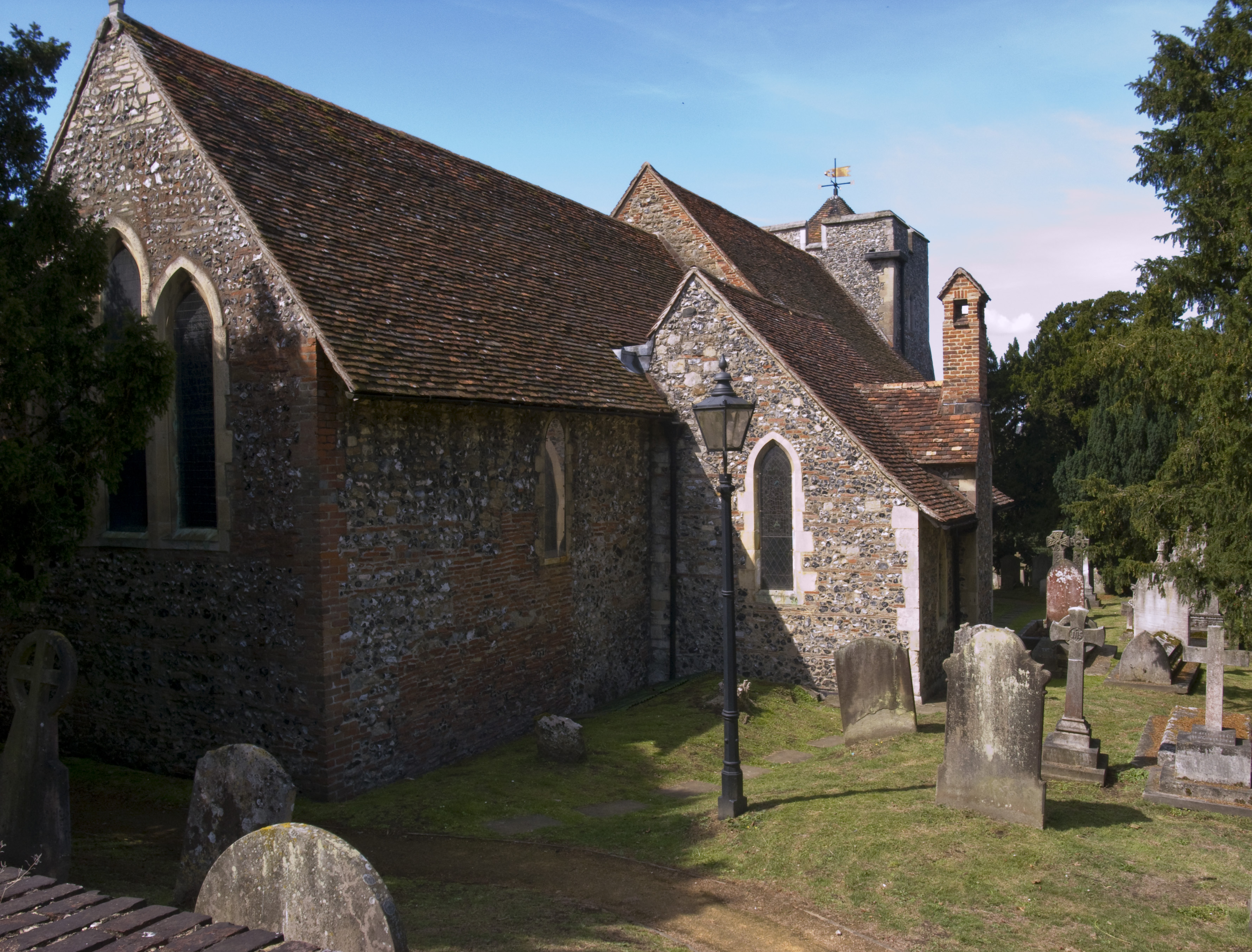
- St Martin's Church

- Location within Kent
- 51°16′40.76″N 1°5′37.77″E
- Location: Canterbury, Kent, England

History
- Built: before AD 597

Site notes
- Governing body: PCC St Martin & St Paul, Canterbury

UNESCO World Heritage Site
- Official name: Canterbury Cathedral, St Augustine's Abbey, and St Martin's Church
- Type: Cultural
- Criteria: i, ii, vi
- Designated: 1988 (12th session)
- Reference no.: 496
- State: United Kingdom
- Region: Europe and North America

Listed Building – Grade I
- Official name: Church of St Martin
- Designated: 28 February 1952
- Reference no.: 1242166

The Church of St Martin is a Church of England parish church in Canterbury, England. It is known for being the oldest existing church in the English-speaking world (Note: Roman and Celtic churches had existed for centuries prior.) and the oldest English church building still in ecclesiastical use. The church is, along with Canterbury Cathedral and St Augustine's Abbey, part of a World Heritage Site.

Since 1668, the church has been part of the benefice of St Martin and St Paul Canterbury.

== Early history ==
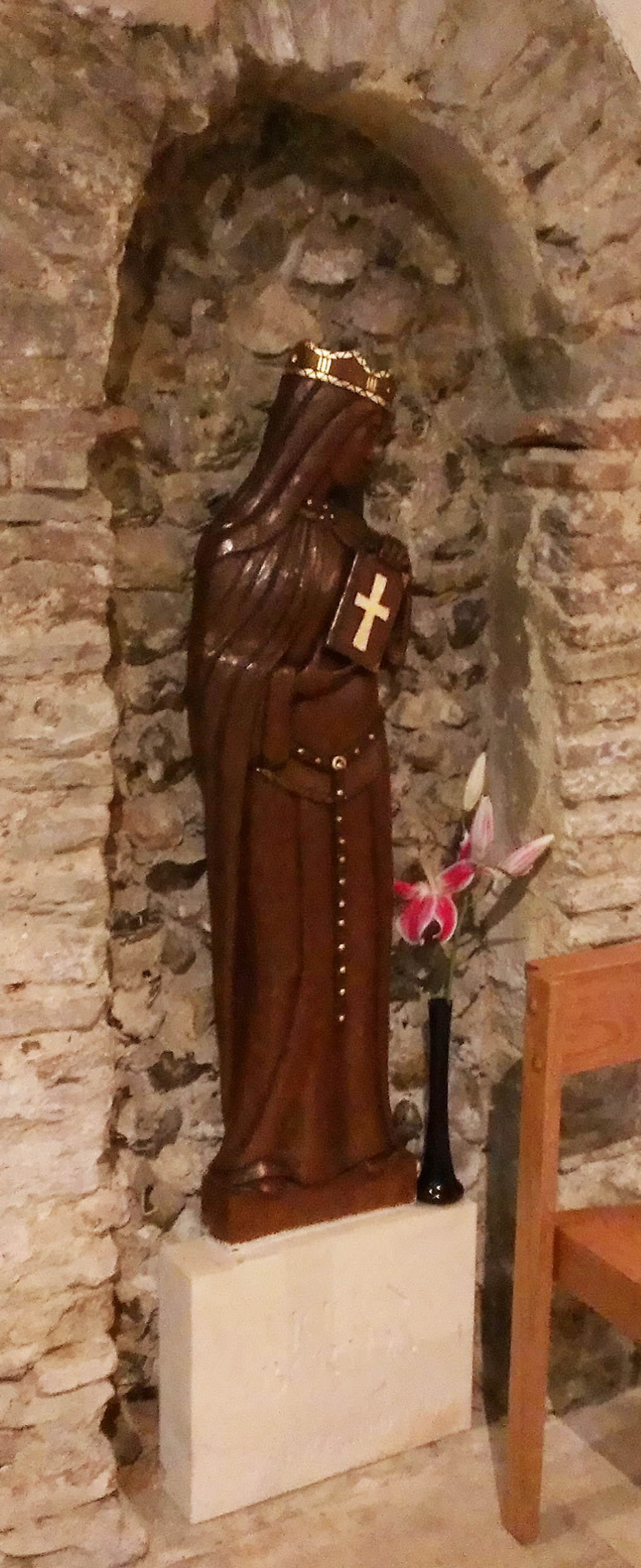
St Bertha of Kent wooden statue, south wall of the church

St Martin's was the private chapel of Queen Bertha of Kent (died in or after 601) before Saint Augustine of Canterbury arrived from Rome in 597. Queen Bertha was a Christian Frankish princess who arrived in England with her chaplain, Bishop Liudhard. Her pagan husband, Æthelberht of Kent, allowed her to continue to practise her religion by renovating a Romano-British building (ca. AD 580). The Venerable Bede says the building had been in use as a church in the late Roman period but had fallen into disuse. Bede specifically names it as being dedicated to Martin of Tours, a city located near where Bertha grew up. Although Bede implies that the building in Roman times had been a church, modern scholarship has questioned this.

Upon his arrival, Augustine used St Martin's as his mission headquarters, enlarging it circa AD 597. With the subsequent establishment of Canterbury Cathedral and St Augustine's Abbey, St Martin's lost prestige but retains its priority and historical importance.

Shortly before 1844, a hoard of gold coins which possibly date from the late 6th century was found in the churchyard, one of which is the Liudhard medalet, which bears an image of a diademed figure with a legend referring to Liudhard.

== Architecture ==
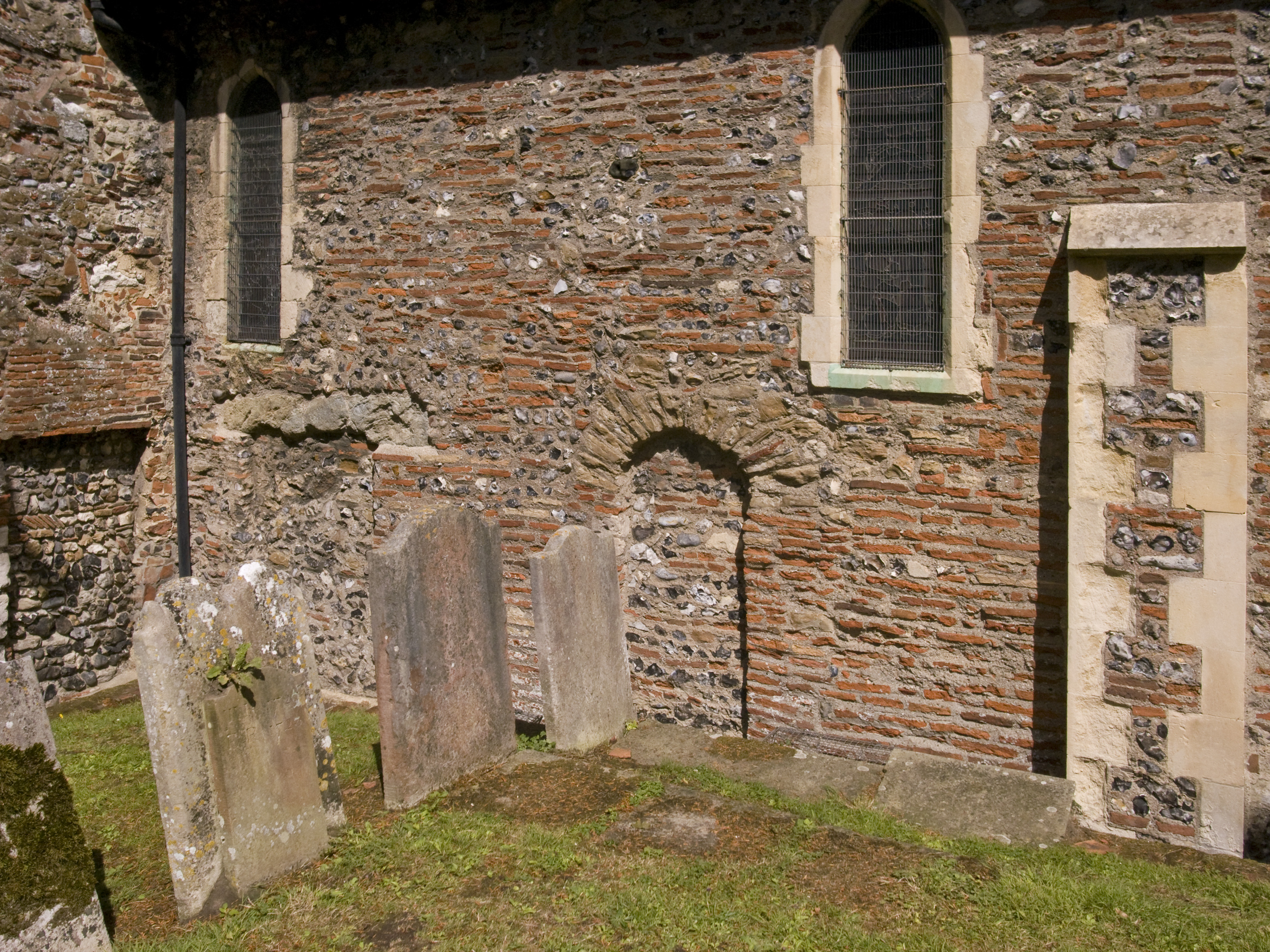
Roman bricks in the chancel wall

Local finds prove that Christianity did exist in this area of the city at the time, and the church contains many reused Roman bricks or spolia, as well as complete sections of walls of Roman tiles. At the core of the church the brick remains of a Roman tomb were integrated into the structure. Several sections of walls are clearly very early, and it is possible that a blocked square-headed doorway in the chancel was the entrance to Bertha's church, while other sections of wall come from the period after the Gregorian mission in the 7th or 8th centuries, including most of the nave. The apse that was originally at the east end has been removed. The tower is much later, in Perpendicular style. The church is a Grade I listed building.

== Graves ==
The churchyard contains the graves of many notable local families and well-known people including: Henry Alford, churchman and theologian; Canon William Cadman, a 19th-century evangelist; Thomas Sidney Cooper (artist) and Mary Tourtel, the creator of Rupert Bear. Eleven Commonwealth service personnel from both World Wars are buried in St Martin's Churchyard.

== Music ==
The church has a continuing musical tradition from the monks of St Augustine to the present day.

The tower has three bells set for swing-chiming, using levers. The tenor weighs 6 long cwt 2 qr 0 lb (728 lb or 330 kg).

Images of St Martin's Church, Canterbury

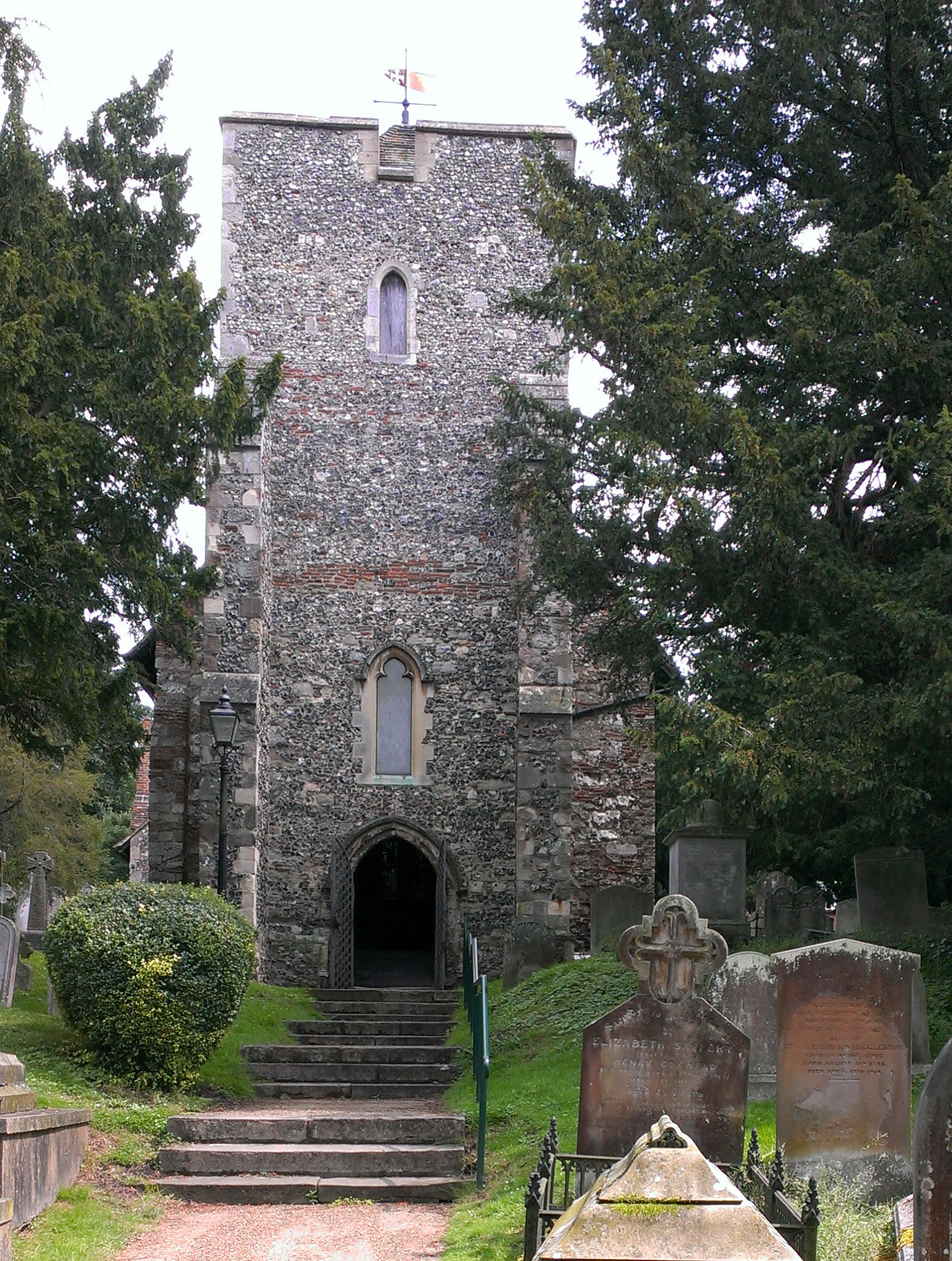
West elevation

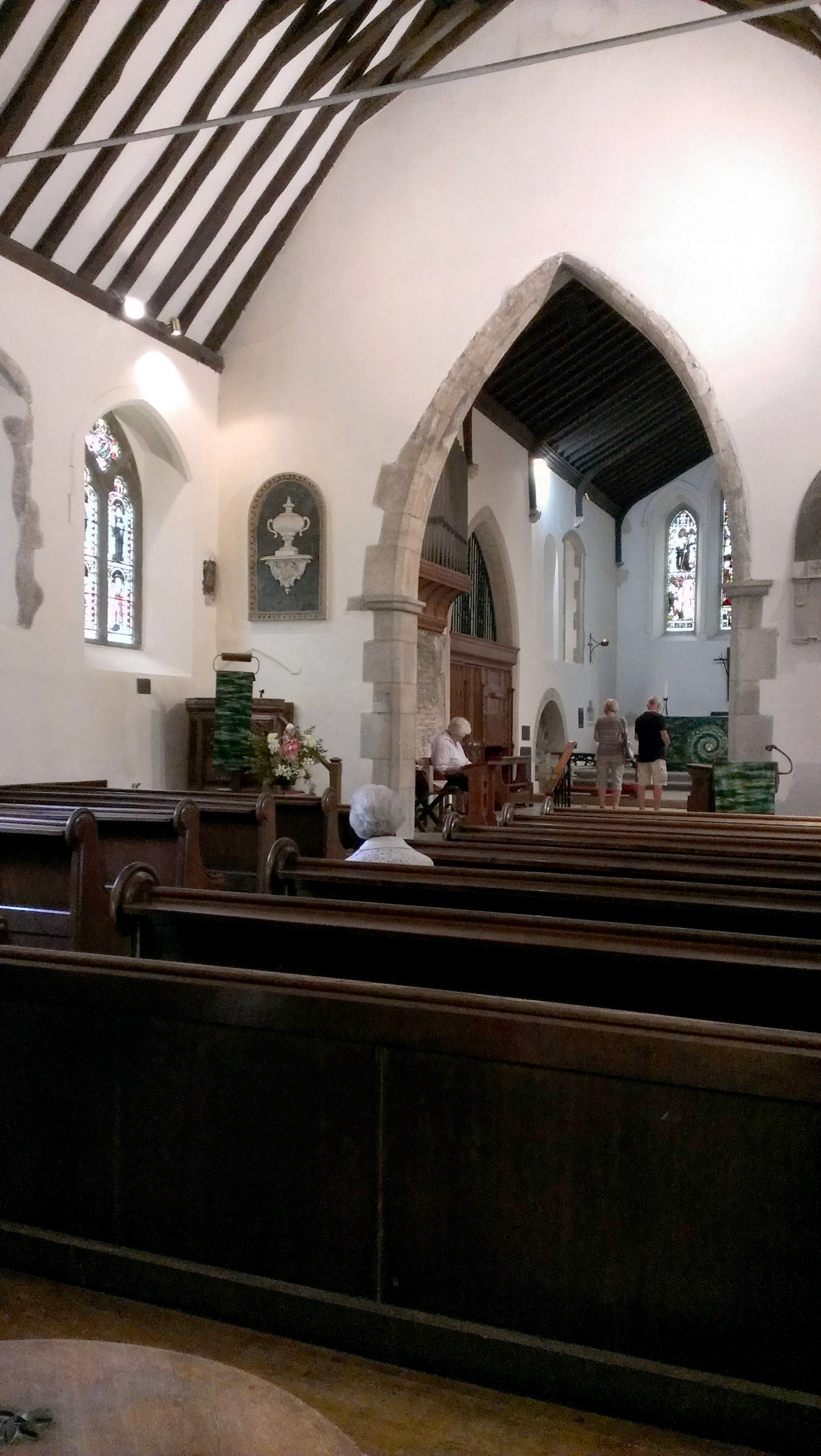
Interior view

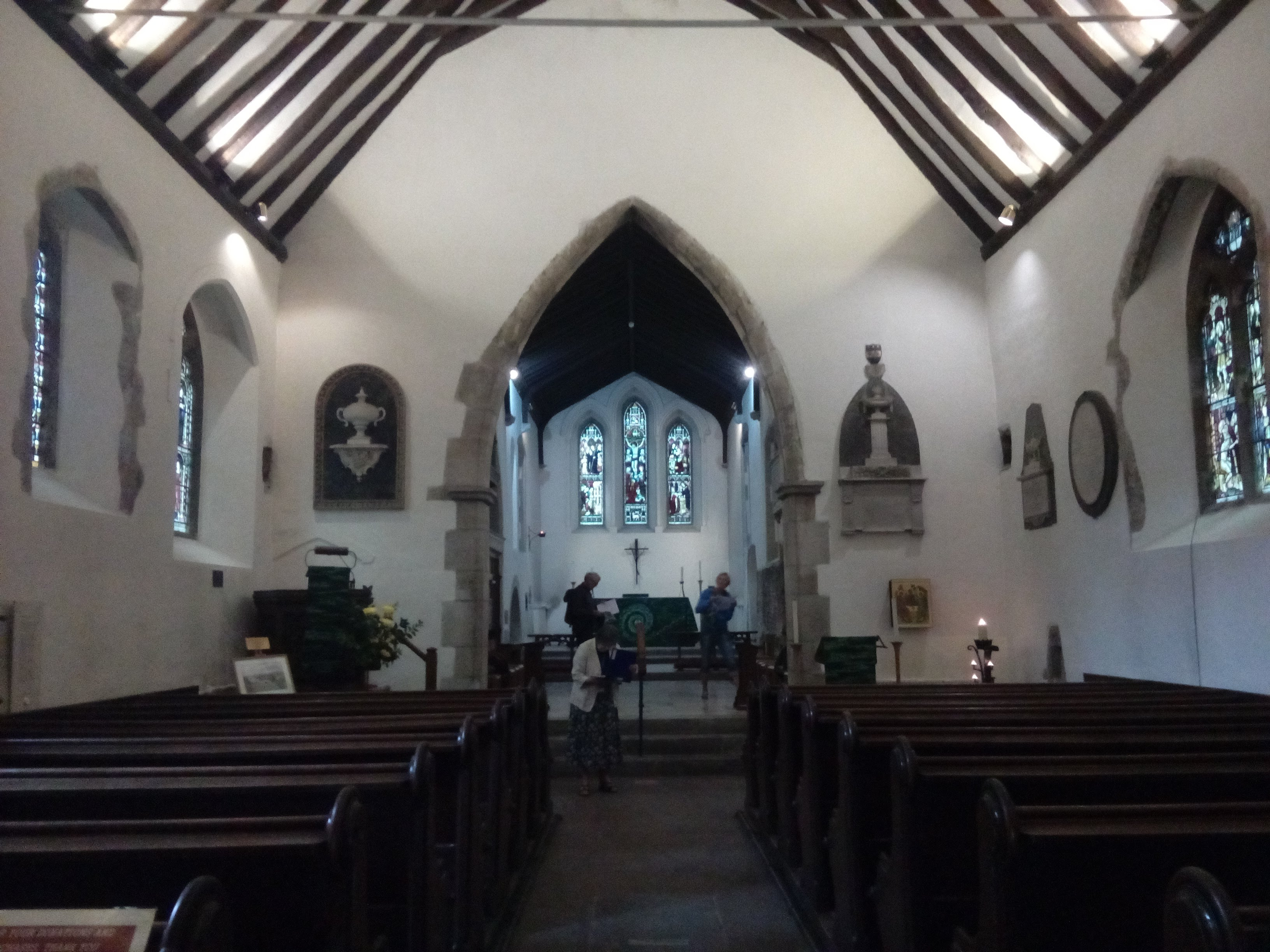
Interior

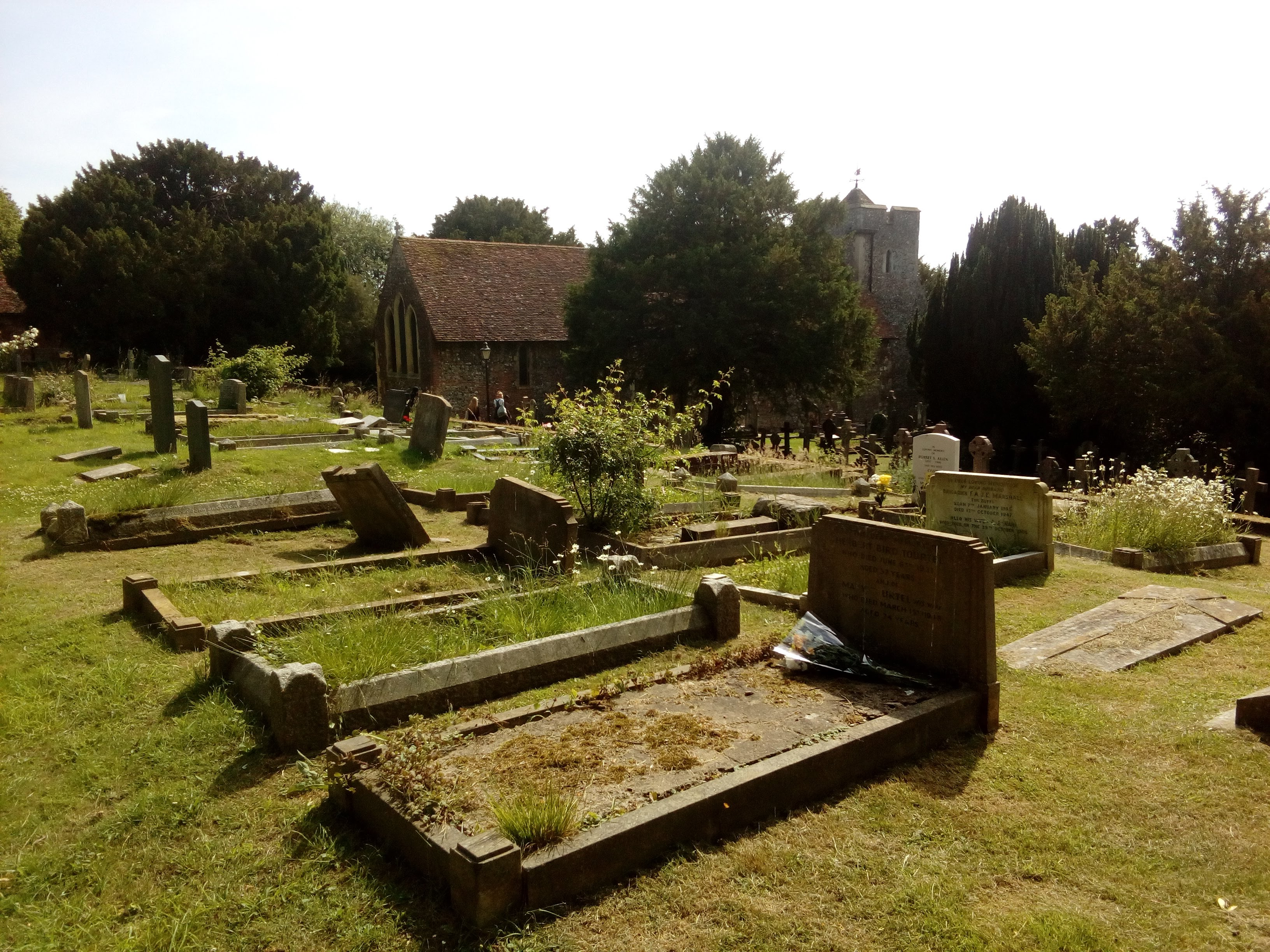
Graveyard

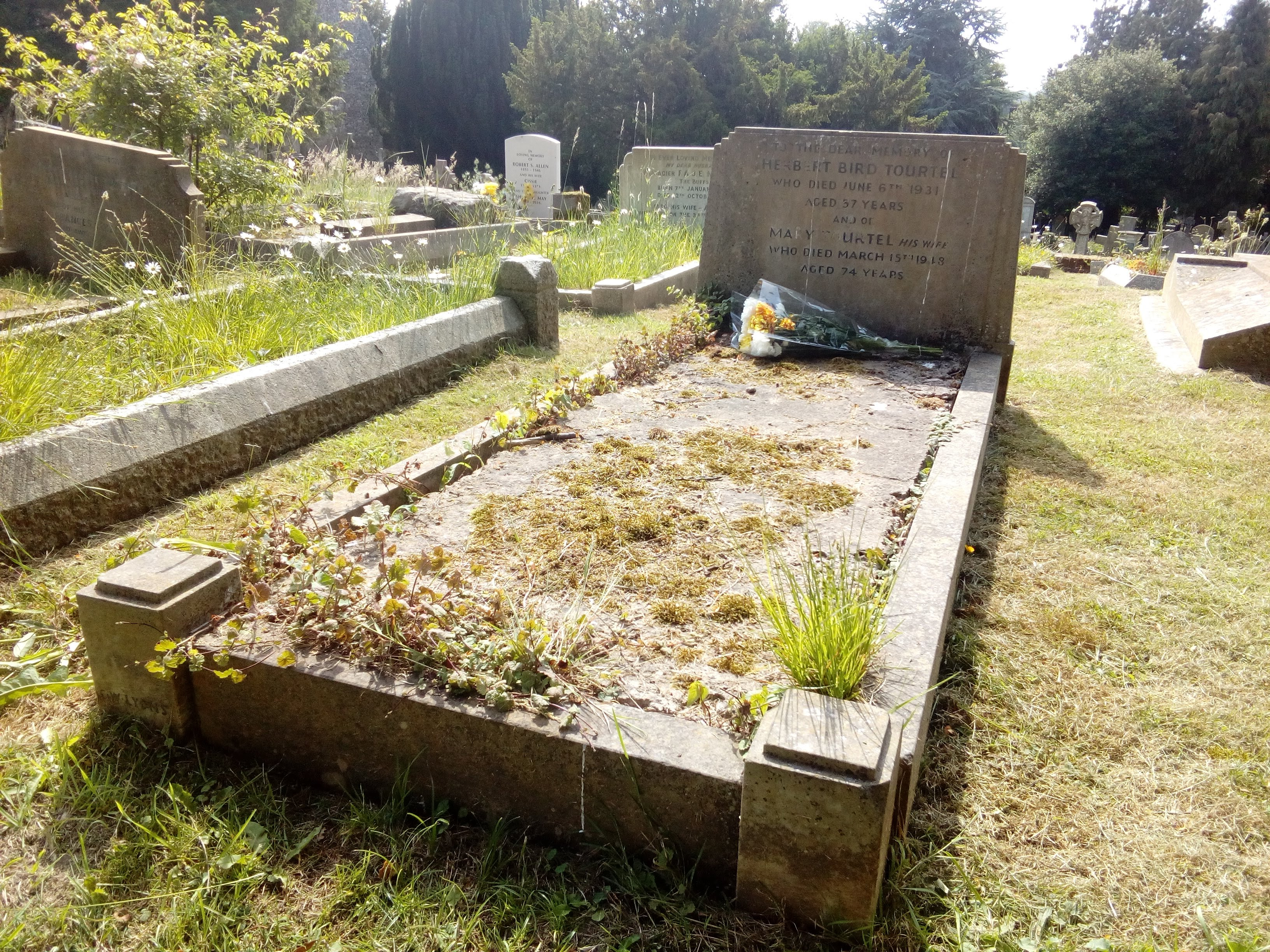
Grave of Mary and Herbert Tourtel

== See also ==
- Canterbury-St Martin's hoard
- St Martin's Hospital, Canterbury
- St Martin's Mill, Canterbury

== Sources ==
- F. Haverfield, "Early British Christianity" The English Historical Review Vol. 11, No. 43. (Jul., 1896)
- Service, Alastair, The Buildings of Britain, A Guide and Gazetteer, Anglo-Saxon and Norman, 1982, Barrie & Jenkins (London), ISBN 0-09-150131-8
