= Maximus of Cahors =

Bishop of Cahors, France

Maximus of Cahors was a 6th-century bishop of Cahors, France.

He is known only as an attendee at the Fifth Council of Orléans in 549.
