= Nectarius of Autun =

6th-century bishop and Roman Catholic saint

Bishop
- Born: 6th century France
- Died: 13 September 549/50; Autun, France
- Honored in: Roman Catholic Church
- Feast: 13 September

Saint Nectarius of Autun (French: Nectaire d'Autun) was a 6th-century bishop of Autun, and a saint of the Roman Catholic Church.

== Biography ==
Nectarius was bishop of Autun from 540 to his death on 13 September 549 or 550. He was a friend of Saint Germain of Paris, whom he appointed abbot of the Abbey of St. Symphorian, Autun.

The first cathedral of Autun was consecrated during his episcopate. In 542, Nectarius travelled to Milan to venerate the relics of Saint Nazarius, and although he was unable to obtain any of them for Autun, he was offered a piece of cloth covered with the blood of Nazarius and his companion Celsus, which on his return he gave to the new cathedral, which was then dedicated to Nazarius.

During this trip, he met Emanus, a Cappadocian pilgrim who, after living seven years in Rome and Italy, was going to Autun, attracted by a vision of the tomb of Saint Symphorian. The bishop kept him as a guest for several years, after which Emanus went to evangelize the country of the Carnutes. His veneration for Saint Symphorian brought him back to Autun, where he attracted crowds by his miracles.

In 549, Nectarius participated in the Fifth Council of Orléans, together with Saint Germain and seventy-one archbishops and bishops of France.

He died in Autun on 13 September 549 or 550.

His feast day is 13 September.
