= Saffaracus of Paris =

Saffaracus of Paris was a 6th century French bishop.

== Early life ==
We know almost nothing of his life, except that he was probably of Frankish origin and before being made Bishop of Paris he was an abbot.

== Career ==
Saffaracus was present at the Fifth Council of Orléans in 549.

Saffaracus is best known for having been at a council called to dismissed from his ministry. This event is reported by Gregory of Tours, who refers to it without giving any explanation. However, Charles Louandre specifies, that convinced of a capital crime, he was exiled to a monastery where he finished his days.

Saffaracus, forgot the duties of his ministry. Accused and convinced by his own confession of a capital crime, in a council summoned to Paris expressly to judge him, he was condemned to be shut up for the rest of his days in a monastery; but this is an exceptional fact.

This capital crime was probably simony or repeated adultery, as other authors have pointed out.

As for the council or synod in question, it is the Council of Paris, which some fix in 551, while others in 552, but more likely of 553. This council, organized to judge him, was summoned by King Childebert and presided over by the archbishop of Arles, Sapaudus.

Be that as it may, Saffaracus deposed was confined in a monastery and replaced by Eusebius, although Gregory of Tours says Saint Nicet replaced him.
