= Canterbury-St Martin's hoard =

6th-century coin-hoard discovered in the 19th-century in England

Coordinates: 51.277991°N 1.087748°E

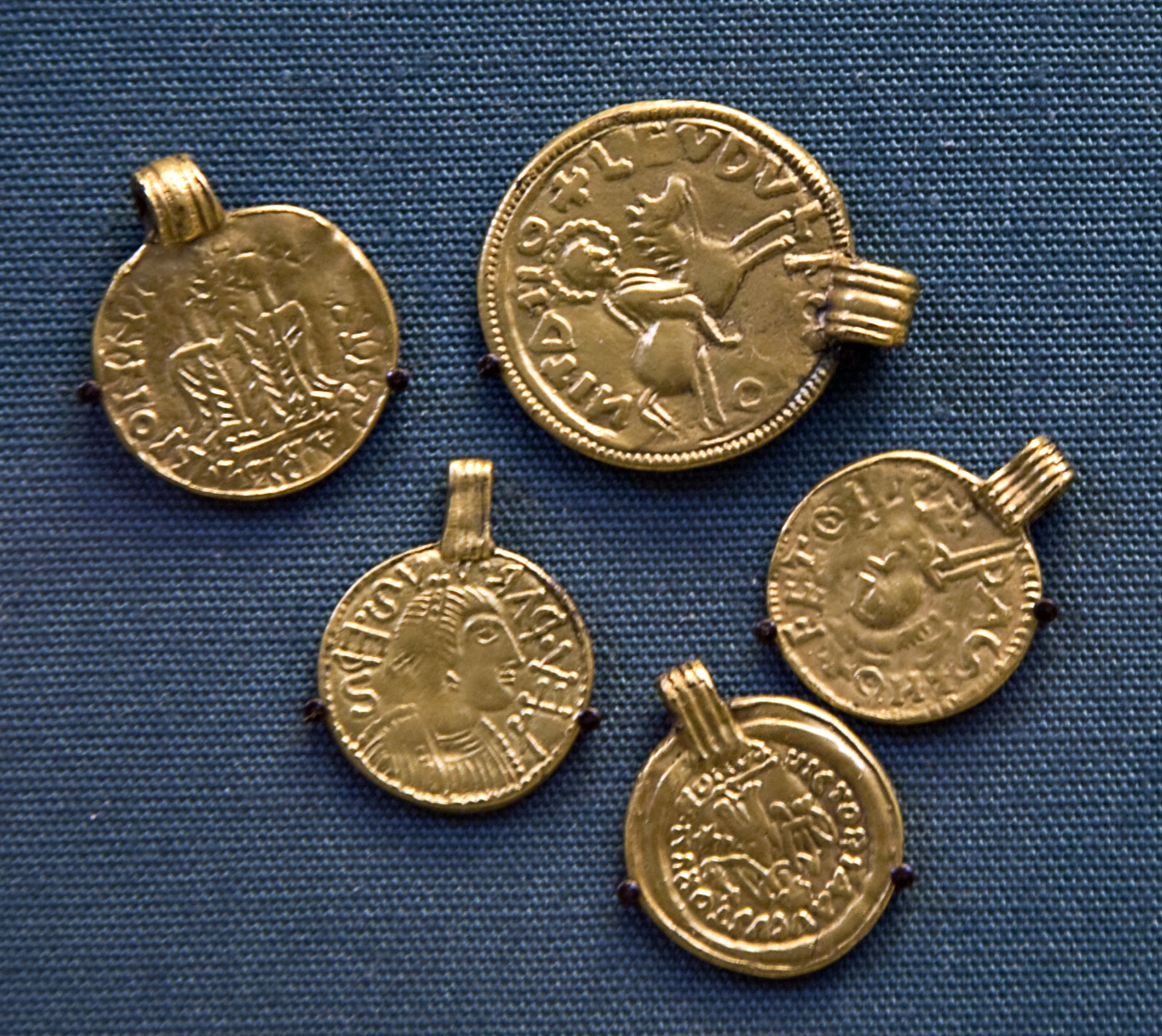
- Replicas of coin-pendants from the hoard, in the British Museum
- Material: Gold coins and jewellery
- Size: at least 9 items
- Created: 4th through 6th centuries AD
- Discovered: 1840s
- Present location: mostly World Museum, Liverpool

The Canterbury-St Martin's hoard is a coin-hoard dating from the 6th century, found in the 19th century at Canterbury, Kent. The group, in the World Museum, Liverpool, consists of eight items, including three gold coins mounted with suspension loops for use as pendants. One of these is the Liudhard medalet, the earliest surviving Anglo-Saxon coin. Another coin is in the Bibliothèque Nationale in Paris.

== Discovery and publication ==
The hoard was found some time before 25 April 1844, when some of the items from the find were first discussed at a meeting of the Royal Numismatic Society by Charles Roach Smith. All that Smith knew of the date when they were found was that it was "a few years since", as he wrote in 1844. The location of the hoard is usually given as the churchyard of St Martin's Church, Canterbury. However, the first publication about the find, by Smith, states that the find was on the "grounds of the monastery of St Augustine". The objects were acquired by W. H. Rolfe, a resident of Sandwich, Kent, in two stages, a first acquisition of three items acquired before April 1844, and five more items procured soon after September 1844.

The first three items were first published in 1844 in Collectanea Antiqua, and when the five further items were obtained, that publication was amended to reflect the new items. Smith then published the entire contents of the hoard in the Numismatic Chronicle in 1845.

The items in the hoard have been examined by x-ray and fluorescence. The author of this study, S. C. Hawkes, argues that the eight items in the hoard were found in different graves. However, the historian Philip Grierson felt that the possibility of two graves from different time periods both containing coins of the same period was so small as to make the likelihood of the hoard coming from two graves slim.

The hoard is the only late-6th- or early-7th-century find of gold jewellery in a grave in a churchyard. All of the coins in the hoard were probably part of a necklace that was buried in a woman's grave. One of the items in the hoard, the Liudhard medalet, is the earliest surviving Anglo-Saxon coin.

== Contents ==
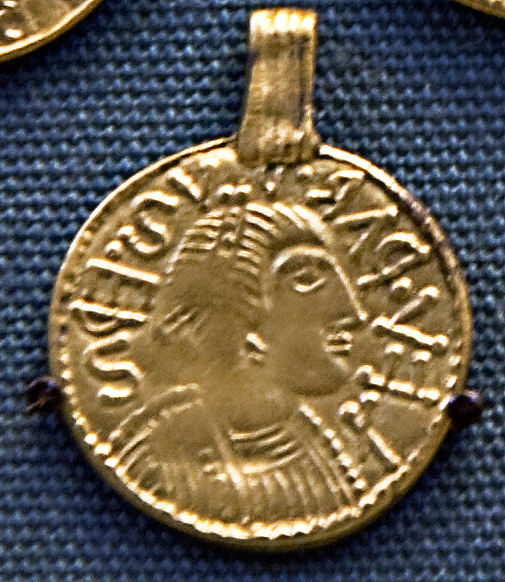
Replicas of the Liudhard medalet

The known objects in the hoard are eight items:

- An Italian tremissis with an inscription dating it to the reign of Emperor Justin II, who reigned 565 to 578
- The Liudhard medalet, an Anglo-Saxon gold coin or medallion, dating from the late 6th century
- A gold coin imitating a 4th-century bronze coin, featuring two soldiers on one side
- A solidus with a bust on one side
- A Frankish tremissis of Merovingian date minted at St Bertrand-de-Comminges
- A Frankish tremissis of Merovingian date minted at Agen
- An intaglio of Roman manufacture set in gold
- A circular brooch

The first three items listed were the original items acquired by Rolfe, with the others being acquired later.

Besides these eight items, it appears likely that at least one other item originally was found with the above items:

- A coin with an inscription of Oloron set in a loop, which is now in the Bibliotheque Nationale

There may have been other items that were found with the hoard, but their identification is not possible.

== Ownership and current location ==
Besides the Oloron coin, which is at the Bibliotheque Nationale in Paris, the other eight items are at the World Museum in Liverpool. From Rolfe, the eight items were acquired by Joseph Mayer, who gave them to the City Museums of Liverpool, which became the World Museum later.
