= Aregius =

French Catholic bishop

Aré or Aregius of Nevers was bishop of Nevers in France and is known because he subscribed to the deeds of both the Fifth Council of Orléans, in 549 and the Second Synod of Paris (551/2 / 556/73 / 567) in 551.

According to a legendary tradition after he died is body was set adrift on the river but the boat he was set on returned where it was cast off and that is where he was interred. Many healings have been attributed to this place. A painting by Dominique Trévillot depicts this scene. He rests in Decize.
