= Agricola of Chalon-sur-Saône =

6th-century Bishop of Chalon-sur-Saône, France

Bishop Agricola was a 6th-century Bishop of Chalon-sur-Saône in France, where he built a leper-hospital.

== Life ==
Agricola was born to a senatorial family around 497. In 532 he was elected to the episcopal see of Chalon-sur-Saene, where he long shone for his virtues. Gregory of Tours praises his zeal and ability in preaching and austerity of life. It is said that throughout life Agricola limited himself to taking little food at sunset. He further distinguished himself in the construction of various buildings, enlarging and decorating a number of churches. Towards the end of his episcopate, he transferred to the church of the lepers' hospital, the remains of Saint Desideratus (Didier).

Signing himself as Agroecola he was a signatory of the council of Orléans in 538, 541, 549, Council of Paris (552), and the Council of Lyon (570).

Agricola died in 580 at the age of eighty-three, after having ruled the diocese forty-eight years, and was buried in the church of Saint Marcellus. In 878 his relics were moved to the church of Saint Pierre by Bishop Gerebald. Pope John VIII, returning from the Council of Troyes (August 878), authorized Agricola's cultus. In 1315, a feast was established in the diocese of Chalon-sur-Saene, celebrated on 30 April, in which the ancient bishop and Saint Desiderato were remembered. Agricola is remembered on 17 March in the Roman Martyrology.
