= Beaidh =

Beaidh (died 523) was an Irish bishop (of Roscommon) in the 6th century.
