= Rieul of Senlis =

First bishop of Senlis (died 260)

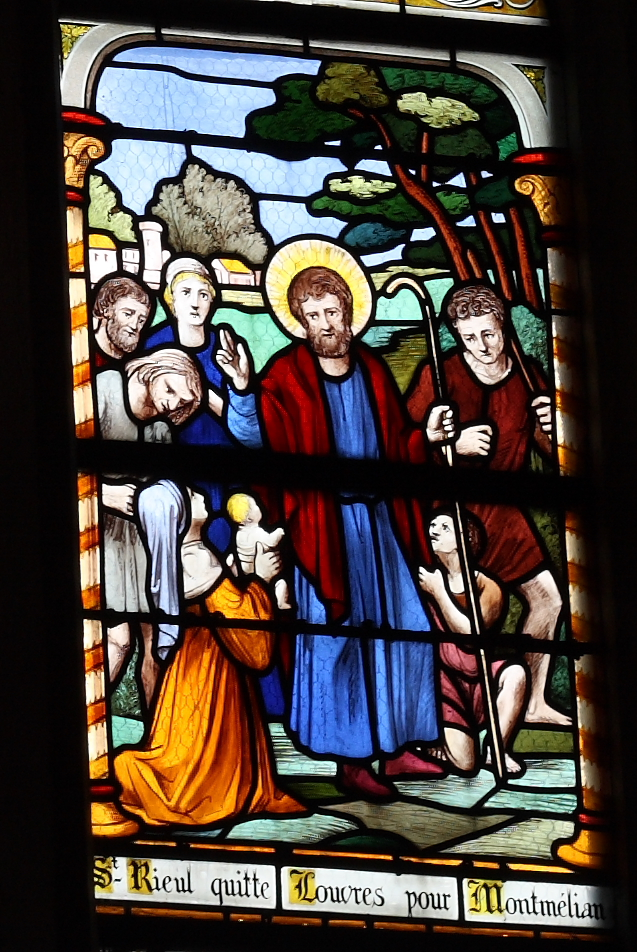
Saint Rieul

Rembert Regulus (Rieul) of Senlis (died 260) was the first bishop of Senlis. His feast day is March 30.

== Biography ==
Rieul de Senlis was perhaps one of the companions of Denis of Paris and Lucian of Beauvais who would have evangelized Senlis in the Oise.

Rieul de Senlis and Regulus of Arles are sometimes confused. On this question, historians are divided. Basil Watkins says that they are probably the same person as Regulus of Arles. Some sources, such as the martyrology, say that Saint Rieul was bishop of Arles and he died in Senlis; others like the Bollandists, do not hesitate to settle the difficulty, making two saints Rieul, the one bishop of Arles, the other bishop of Senlis. The historian of Valois, Claude Carlier, finds the existence of relics in two different places, Arles and Senlis, proof, that the bishop of Arles and the bishop of Senlis are two different people. However, multiple relics frequently exist of the same saint.

"He traveled through the forests and surrounding countryside, cottages and villages to announce the Gospel or meet other missionaries." He consecrated two churches for the new Christians, one dedicated to the Blessed Virgin and the second located outside the gates of the city which is placed under the invocation of Saint Peter and Saint Paul. He built many oratories in his diocese and governed Senlis for more than forty years with persevering solicitude.

== The relics ==
The relics of Saint Rieul de Senlis, preserved in the cathedral, were analyzed in 1999 according to the technique of carbon 14. It was concluded that there was a 65% probability that the owner died between 320 and 445 (compared to 12% probability for the period 260 - 320, and 20% for the period 445 - 535 ). If it is indeed the body of Rieul, it should delay the date of evangelization of the region of Senlis to the fourth century. This date is much more likely than that of the third century, which is too early for the region. Excavations of Marc Durand indicate that the Gallo-Roman temple in the Halatte forest near Senlis, was very active still in the third century, and was violently destroyed around 385 - 390 . Then, after a period of weak reactivation related to the maintenance of paganism (the frogs of Saint Rieul?), It was definitively abandoned towards 400/425

== Legends ==
Gérard de Nerval, in his Walks and Memories ( 1854 ), recounts a legend told from the time of his childhood, according to which, near Rully (Oise) a crowd gathered to listen to Saint Rieul, but the noise of the frogs of a nearby pond (the source of the Aunette ), a concert of croaking, drowned out his voice. With a gesture, Saint Rieul imposed silence. All are silent except for one. (Frogs, like dragons, are often metaphors for rural paganism, defeated by evangelizers like Rieul.)

One of his journeys took him to Beauvais where he distinguished himself by a dazzling miracle: returning one evening to his diocese after having visited Saint Lucien, he met a blind man in Brenouille who begged him to restore his sight. Touched with compassion, he executes, the blind then recovers his sight and sings the praises of the Lord.

A church is dedicated to Saint Rieul in Brenouille.

== Bibliography ==
- Henri-Louis-Joseph Blond, "Research on the date of the apostolate of Saint-Rieul", Archaeological Committee of Senlis, Reports and Memories 1863, Senlis 1864, p. 58–96.
- Amédée Vicomte of Caix de Saint-Aymour, " The legend of Saint-Rieul ", Causeries du besacier: Mixes to serve the history of the countries that today form the department of Oise, Paris, A. Claudin / H Champion, 2nd series, 1895, p. 81-127.
