= Theodore the Sacristan =

Sacristan in the Church of St. Peter in Rome

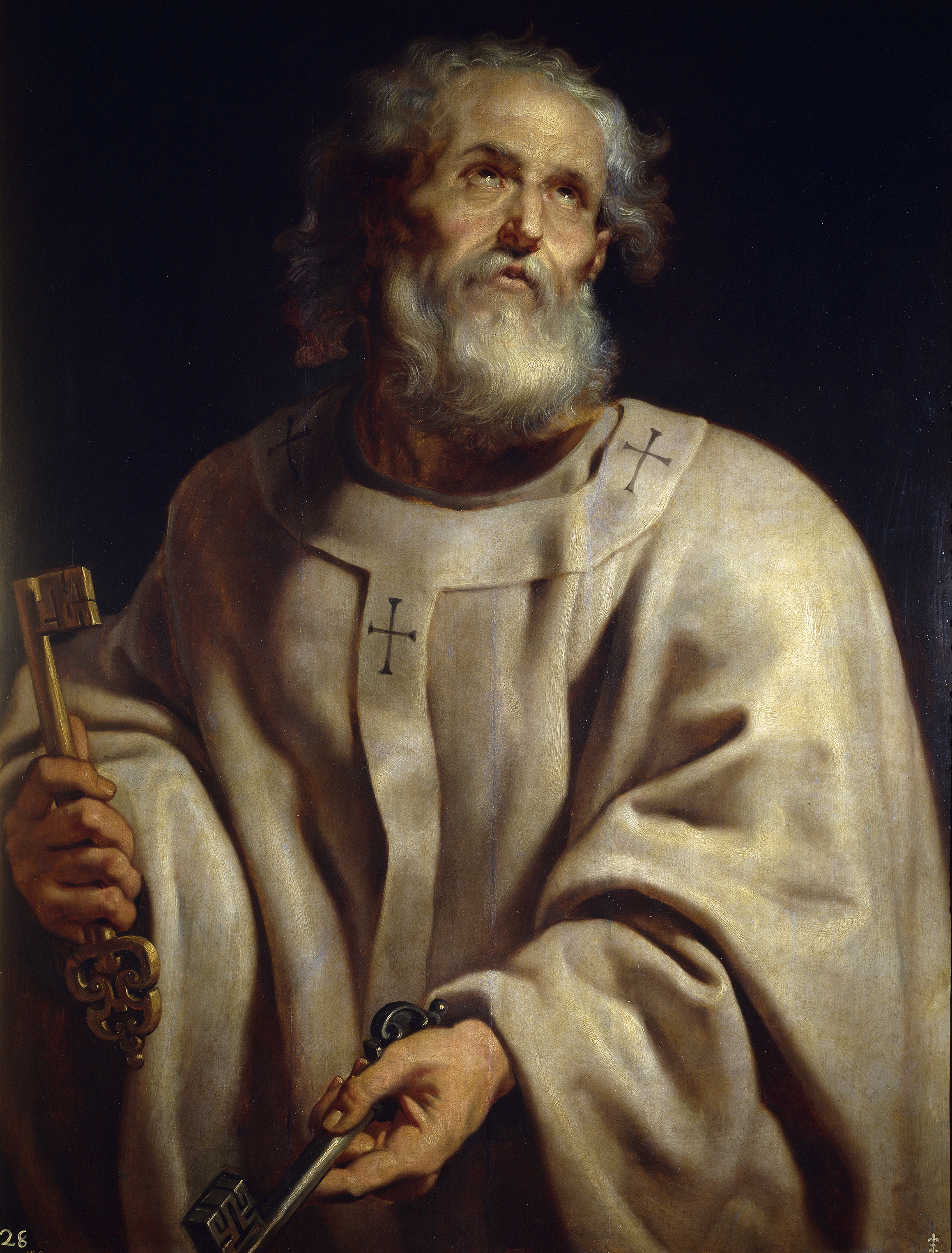
Gregory the Great wrote that Saint Peter appeared to Theodore clad in white vestments.

Theodore (Latin: Theodorus) was a sixth-century sacristan in the Church of St. Peter in Rome. He is mentioned in the writings of Gregory the Great, and was later venerated as a saint.

== Life ==
What is known of Theodore's life comes from Gregory the Great's Dialogues, where he appears in Book III, Chapter 24. There, Gregory records that Theodore once rose very early in the morning in order to tend the lamps that hung by the door of the basilica. He was up on a ladder that he used when refilling the lamps with oil, when Saint Peter appeared to him vested in a white stole. The saint asked him, "Theodore, why have you risen so early?" and disappeared. Theodore was afterwards struck by great fear, and in his shock was unable to rise from his bed for the next several days.

Gregory goes on to editorialize on the encounter, saying that the apparition was a sign of Saint Peter's favor towards Theodore: "The blessed Apostle wished to show those who served him that whatever they did for his honor, he always and unceasingly observed it, for the recompense of their reward." When the interlocutor of the Dialogues, Peter the Deacon, questions why Theodore would have been shocked and sickened by having seen Saint Peter, Gregory replies with a citation from Scripture in which the prophet Daniel is likewise shocked into illness by a troubling vision: "And I Daniel languished, and was sick for some days: [...] and I was astonished at the vision, and there was none that could interpret it" (Daniel 8:27).

Gregory mentions Theodore alongside another saintly sacristan of St. Peter's, Abundius.

Theodore died in 560. His body is believed to have been laid to rest in the basilica where he served, although the precise place is not known.

== Veneration ==
Theodore is commemorated in the Roman Martyrology on December 26, which records the following:

Saint Theodore the Sacristan

Sacristan
- Died: c. 560; Rome (buried in St. Peter's Basilica)
- Venerated in: Roman Catholic Church
- Feast: 26 December or 11 February

Romæ sancti Theodori mansionarii Ecclesiæ sancti Petri, cujus meminit beatus Gregorius Papa.
In Rome, Saint Theodore, the sacristan of the Church of Saint Peter, who is mentioned by blessed Pope Gregory.

An 1805 source, however, lists his feast day on February 11, noting that the feast was kept on that day at St. Peter's Basilica. Before the new basilica was built, there used to be an image of him in one of the chapels in front of the portico.
