= Denis O'Mulkyran =

Denis O'Mulkyran (died 1224) was Archdeacon of Ardcarne in the mid-13th century.
