= Eutychius of Vienne =

Catholic bishop

Eutychius of Vienne was a 6th century bishop of the Roman Catholic Archdiocese of Vienne in France. Very little is known of his career, except his was time of expansion for Christianity in the early French Kingdom. He was a signatory of the Fifth Council of Orléans.
