= Maculphe =

Frankish saint and bishop (6th century)

Maculphe (also known as Malulfus or Mallulf) was a 6th-century bishop of the former diocese of Senlis.

He is mentioned once in the History of the Franks by Gregory of Tours. Gregory claimed that when king Chilperic I was assassinated, he was deserted by his people who had no love for him; however, when Maculphe heard of the king's death, Maculphe set out to take the king's body and had it buried in the Church of Saint Vincent in Paris.

He died in 584. He is celebrated as a saint in the Catholic church with his feast day on 4 May.
