= Ounga, Tunisia =

Archaeological site in Tunisia

Ounga
- Maqom Hadesh; Macomades Minores; Macomades Iunca
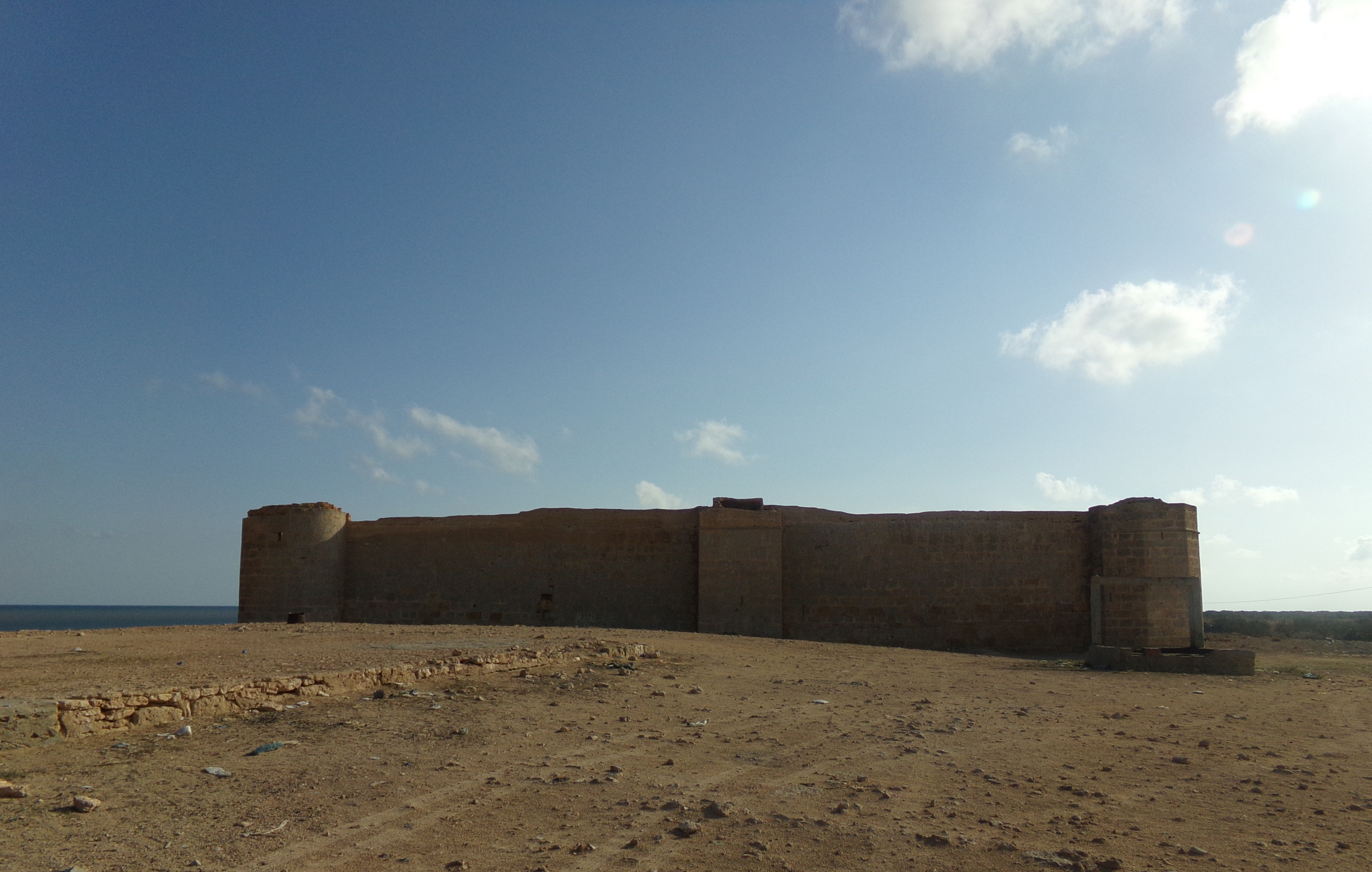
- The Byzantine fort at Ounga

- Location within Tunisia
- 34°28′06″N 10°24′47″E
- Location: Tunisia

Ounga, also known as Younga and Jounga, is an archaeological site on the Mediterranean coast of Tunisia, located 45 km (28 mi) south of Sfax along the Mediterranean coast. The area is also known for its oil fields.

== History ==
Ounga was a Phoenician and Carthaginian colony under the name Māqōm Ḥadash (Punic: 𐤌𐤒𐤌𐤇𐤃𐤔, mqmḥdš, "New Place"). The coastal town was the intersection of the road from Carthage to Tacape and the road branching off to Sufetula.

After the Punic Wars, the area fell under Roman control. The name was latinized to Macomades. It was variously distinguished from the Macomades in present-day Algeria as Macomades Minores ("Lesser Macomades") during the early empire and as Macomades Iunci, Iunca, Lunci, or Lunca under the later empire.

The name of the city changed in the 4th century. In ancient times, Ounga was the site of Christian activity that produced various religious buildings. Accordingly, it maintained relations with other cities such as Carthage. Historians, such as Tunisian archaeologist Zainab Benzina, state that a representative of the city of Younga, the bishop Valentinianus, attended the Council of Carthage (412). In addition, the city hosted a provincial council in 524.

Remains of the Roman town include three Byzantine basilicas, city ramparts, a citadel, a vaulted cistern and crypts. Some of the remains show Coptic influence.

The citadel was identified in 1944 by French archaeologist Louis Poinssot as the place described by Arab geographers Al Bakri and Al-Idrissi under the name of Kasr er-Roum (Castle of the Romans). It was transformed in the 9th century by the Aghlabids, who modified the upper part of the walls. Poinssot identifies Younga as the new name of the city of Macomades Minores, also called Macomades Lunci or Lunca. The discovery in 1936 of a fragment of a milestone from the mid-3rd century close to Younga definitively confirmed the relationship.

== Bishopric ==
Ounga was the seat of an ancient Latin Catholic diocese, about which little is known.

A synod took place on the site in 524 AD and another in 646 AD after the Muslim conquest of the Maghreb. A Christian monastery was founded in the town around 500 AD. Two bishops are known:

- Verecundus of Iunca
- Valentinianus, who attended the Council of Carthage (412), as above

The bishopric survives today as a titular bishopric, which has been vacant since the departure of the last bishop, Manuel Parrado Carral, in 2008.

== Fortress ==
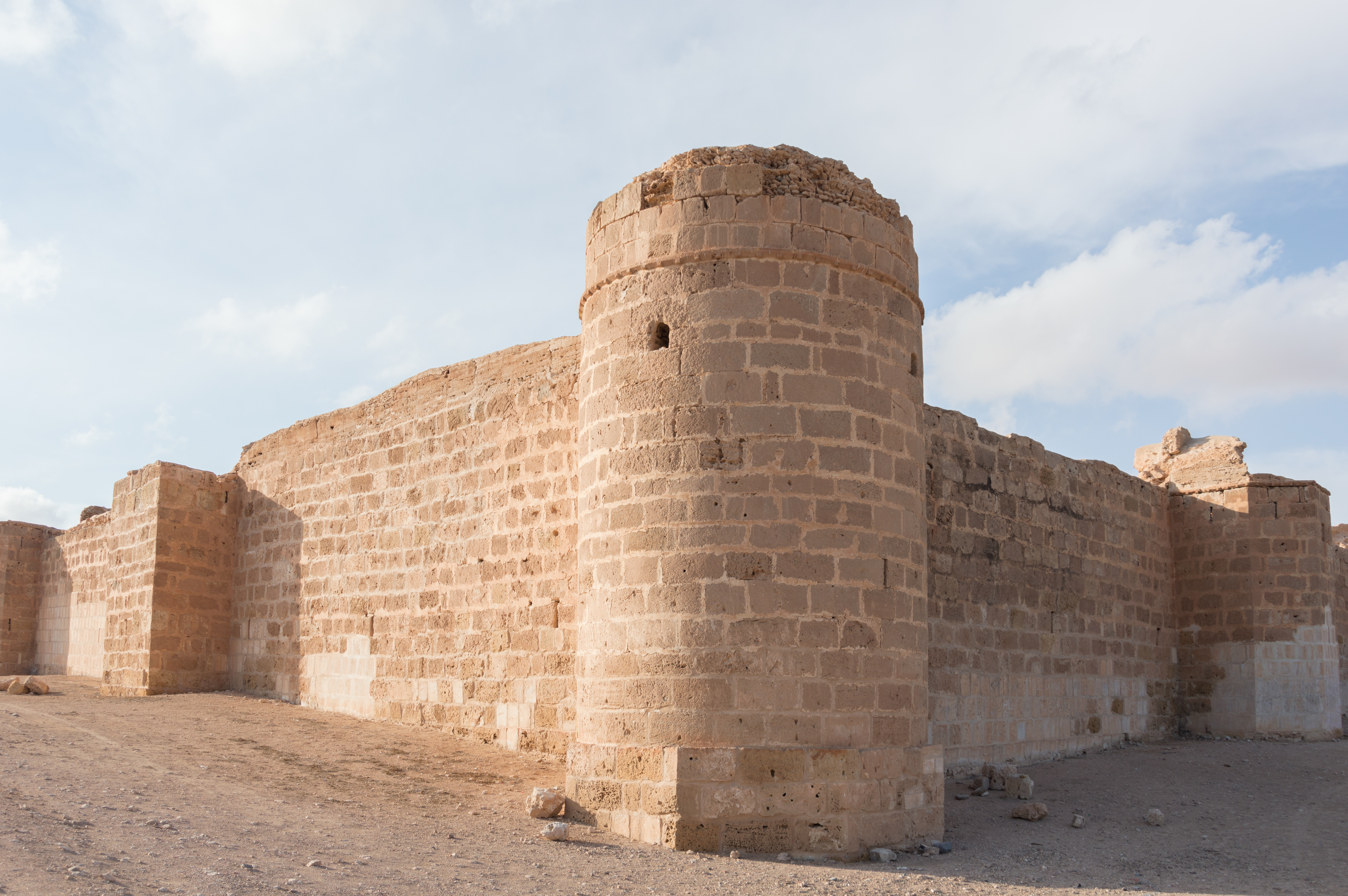
Bordj Younga

The remains of the Byzantine fort known as Bordj Younga are noted for their excellent condition.
