= Droctovaeus =

Frankish abbot in the 6th century

Saint Droctoveus
- Born: c. 530; Auxerre, France
- Residence: Saint Germain-des-Pres in Paris
- Died: c. 580
- Feast: 10 March

Saint Droctoveus (or Droctonius, Droctovée, Droctovius, Drote, Drottoveo, Drotté; c. 530–580) was a Frankish abbot, the first abbot of what became Saint Germain-des-Pres in Paris.

== Life ==
The oldest account of Drottoveo's life was written by his contemporary Venantius Fortunatus in chapter XI of the 1.IX of his Carmina (Songs). A Life was lost after the raids of the Normans, who set fire to the monastery of Saint Vincent in Paris in 845 and again in 857. A monk named Gislemaro of the monastery of Saint Vincent wrote an account between 841 and 847 based on oral testimony, but it has little value.

Droctoveus was born around 530. He became a monk and disciple of Saint Germain of Paris. He became abbot of the Abbey of Saint-Symphorien, Autun, and was then appointed first abbot of Saint Vincent, later known as Saint Germain-des-Pres in Paris. He died around 580 of natural causes. His feast day is 10 March.

== Monks of Ramsgate account ==
The Monks of Ramsgate wrote in their Book of Saints (1921),

DROCTOVEUS (DROCTONIUS) (St.) Abbot. (Mar. 10)
(6th century) A disciple of Saint Germanus of Paris, who became Abbot of the monastery of Saint Symphorian at Autun, a Religious House in which a Rule was followed modelled upon that of the Solitaries of Egypt. When Saint Germanus had become Bishop of Paris and King Childebert had founded the Abbey of Saint Vincent (since called Saint Germain des Pres) Saint Germanus set Saint Droctoveus over it. He ruled the monastery till his death at the age of forty-five (about A.D. 580), “the embodiment (so the chroniclers describe him) of Christian and monastic perfection.” Venantius Fortunatus has left us some lines of verse in praise of Saint Droctoveus.

== Butler's account ==
The hagiographer Alban Butler ( 1710–1773) wrote in his Lives of the Fathers, Martyrs, and Other Principal Saints, under March 10,

St. Droctovæus, Abbot
KING CHILDEBERT having built at Paris a famous abbey in honour of St. Vincent, this saint, who was a native of the diocess of Autun, had been educated under St. Germanus, abbot of St. Symphorian’s at Autun, and was a person eminent for his learning and extraordinary spirit of mortification and prayer, was appointed the second, according to Duplessis according to others, the first Abbot of this house, since called St. Germain-des-Prez, in which he died about the year 580. His body is kept in that abbey, and he is honoured by the church on the 10th of March. His original life being lost, Gislemar, a Benedictin monk of this house, in the ninth age, collected from tradition and scattered memoirs that which we have in Bollandus, and more accurately in Mabillon.

== Sources ==
- Butler, Alban (1815), The Lives of the Fathers, Martyrs, and Other Principal Saints: Compiled from Original Monuments and Other Authentic Records, Illustrated with the Remarks of Judicious Modern Critics and Historians, J. Murphy
- Du Plessis, Toussaints, Dom (1753), Annales de Paris (in French), Paris: Lottin & Butard – via Gallica
- Fusconi, Gian Michele, "San Drottoveo Abate a Parigi", Enciclopedia dei Santi (in Italian) – via Santi Beati
- "Saint Droctoveus", CatholicSaints.info
- St. Augustine's Abbey, Ramsgate (1921). The Book of saints : a dictionary of servants of God canonized by the Catholic Church. London: A. & C. Black, ltd. OCLC 671676136. This article incorporates text from this source, which is in the public domain.
