= Columb the Smith =

Irish saint

Columb the Smith was an Irish saint of the early Middle Ages and possibly of the same time period as St Columba. He was commemorated on 7 June.

Little is concretely known about his identity. It is possible that he is the same person as Columb Cóilrigin mentioned in Adomnan of Iona's biography of St Columba. In Adomnan's account, Columb is a blacksmith who lives in Mide in Ireland (modern-day county Westmeath). He lived his life doing works of charity and all that he gained through his work, he used to help the poor. On the day that he died, Columba, in Iona, saw his death and told others that for his charity in life, his soul was then being carried up to heaven by the angels.
