= Liudhard =

6th-century Frankish bishop

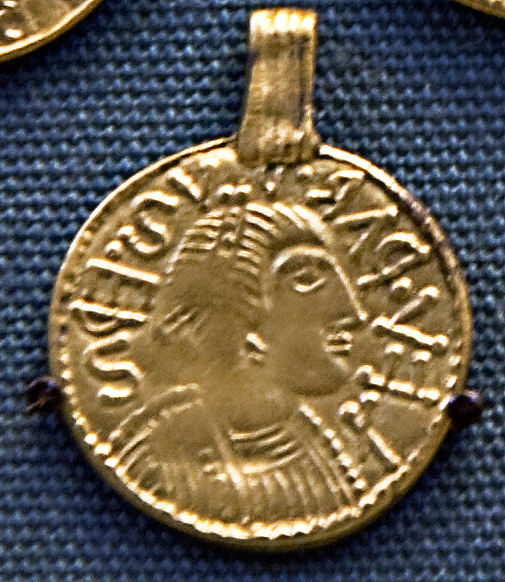
- Replica of the medalet that depicts Liudhard.
- See: unspecified see in Kent
- Term ended: after 600 AD

Liudhard (Old English: Lēodheard; modern French: Létard, also Letard in English) was a Frankish bishop of Senlis in the late 6th century.

== Life ==
In Frankia, Liudhard served as bishop of Senlis and as confessor and chaplain to Bertha of Kent. Upon her marriage to Æthelberht of Kent in c. 580 CE, Liudhard moved with Bertha to Canterbury, where he established her personal chapel, the first Anglo-Saxon Christian church in England, St Martin's, which is the oldest church in continuous use in the English-speaking world.

Liudhard is believed to have died soon after the arrival of Augustine with the Gregorian mission in 597 CE and was initially buried in St Martin's Church, Canterbury, but Archbishop Laurence of Canterbury had his remains removed and buried in the Abbey Church of St Peter and St Paul in the early 7th century. He was regarded locally as a saint, and Goscelin recounts the story of a miracle he performed to help the 11th-century artist and abbot Spearhafoc, who, in thanks, adorned Liudhard's tomb with statues "of enormous size and beauty" depicting Liudhard himself and Queen Bertha.

According to Goscelin, while Spearhafoc was working on metal figures at St Augustine's Abbey in Canterbury, he lost a valuable ring given him by Edward the Confessor's queen, Edith of Wessex, presumably as materials to use in his project. In his distress, he prayed to Liudhard, after which the ring was found. In gratitude, he adorned Liudhard's tomb with the statues. From other mentions, such a description would mean the statues were at least approaching life-size. Also, according to Goscelin and William of Malmesbury, Liudhard "was especially good at speedily responding to appeals for rain," for which purpose his remains would be carried in procession to the fields.

A coin or "medalet", known as the Liudhard medalet, bearing his name, was found in the 19th century in a grave in Canterbury, and is the earliest Anglo-Saxon coin, though it may not have been used as money in the usual way. The design is based on contemporary Continental coins, but has unusual features.

== See also ==
- Christianisation of Anglo-Saxon England

== Sources ==
- Dodwell, C. R. (1982) Anglo-Saxon Art, A New Perspective, Manchester UP, ISBN 0-7190-0926-X. Miracle, p. 213
- Wernher, Martin (1992) "The Liudhard Medalet", in Anglo-Saxon England, Volume 20, eds. Michael Lapidge, et al. Cambridge University Press ISBN 0-521-41380-X, 9780521413800, google books
