= Diocese of Roscommon =

The Diocese of Roscommon was an Irish diocese that in the twelfth century merged with Diocese of Elphin. One abbot, Siadhail is sometimes styled Bishop The only other recorded officer was Gille Na Naomh M'Arthur O'Bruin, who was Archdeacon in the mid thirteenth century.
