= Fifth Council of Orléans =

Christian council in Gaul

The Fifth Council of Orléans (28 October 549) assembled nine archbishops and forty-one bishops. Sacerdos of Lyon presided over this council. The presence of these bishops indicates both the wide spread of Christianity in Gaul by the sixth century, and the increased influence of the Merovingian kings.

== Bishops ==
- Sacerdos of Lyon
- Aurelianus of Arles
- Eutychius of Vienne
- Nicerius of Trier
- Desiderius of Bourges
- Aspasius of Elusa (Eause)
- Constitutus of Sens
- Placidus of Mâcon, first Bishop of Mâcon
- Firminus of Uzès (Uceticenses)
- Agricola of Chalon-sur-Saône
- Urbicus of Bazas
- Rufus of Valence (Octodorensium)
- Gallus of Auvergne (Clermont)
- Saffaracus of Paris
- Domitianus of Tungrensis (Tongres, Liège)
- Eleutherius of Auxerre
- Desiderius of Verdun
- Grammatius of Laon
- Tetricus of Langres
- Nectarius of Autun
- Eusebius of Saintes
- Proculeianus of Auch
- Maximus of Cahors
- Bebianus of Agen
- Aptonius of Angouleme
- Deuterius of Vence
- Lauto of Coutances
- Passivus of Séez
- Clematius of Carpentras
- Vellesius of Gap (Vappincensis)
- Aregius of Nevers
- Hilarius of Digne
- Clementius of Apt
- Palladius of Toulon
- Basilius of Glandèves
- Avolus of Aix
- Febediolus of Rennes
- Gallus of Valence
- Leubenus of Chartres
- Theudobaudis of Lisieux
- Alodius of Tulle
- Licinius of Évreux
- Medoveus of Meaux
- Liberius of Dax
- Amelius of Comminges
- Aletius of Leictoure
- Gonotigernus of Senlis
- Aegridius of Avranches
- Beatus of Amiens
- Ambrosius of Saint-Paul-trois-Châteaux
- [Antoninus of Avignon]‡
- [Magnus of Nice and Cimies]‡
- [Melanus of Albi]‡
- [Lucretius of Die]‡
- [Pappulus of Geneva]‡
- Leucadius of Bayeux‡
- [Faustus of Riez]‡‡
- [Expectatus of Fréjus]‡
- [Eusebius of Antibes]‡‡
- [Praetextatus of Châlons-sur-Saône]‡‡‡
- [Vindemialis of Orange]‡
- [Gallicanus of Embrun]‡‡
- [Agrestius of Tours]‡
- [Leontius of Bordeaux]‡
- [Avolus of Sisteron]‡
- [Ruricius of Limoges]‡‡
- [Ambrosius of Albi]‡‡
- [Theodorus of Conserans (St. Lizien)]‡‡
- [Mappinius of Reims]‡‡
- [Gennobaudus of Lugdunum clavatum]‡‡
- [Albinus of Angers]‡‡‡

‡ Absent, represented by a priest.
‡‡ Absent, represented by a deacon.
‡‡‡ Absent, represented by an abbot.

== Enactments ==
King Childebert had ordered the Council to be summoned to deal with the case of Bishop Marcus of Orleans, who had been driven from his see. After defending Mark, Bishop of Orléans, from attacks made upon him, finding nothing in the charges made by his enemies, the Council issued some twenty-four canons.

The Council pronounced an anathema against the errors of Nestorius and Eutyches (Canon I). It prohibited simony, and prescribed that the election of bishops take place in all freedom, by the clergy and the people, and with the consent of the king (Canon X). Likewise, that no one be consecrated a bishop until he had been one year in the clergy, during which he is to be taught by learned and proven persons in spiritual discipline and rules (Canon IX).

It censured all who attempted to subject slaves who had been emancipated within the church to any servitude whatsoever, and those who dared take, retain, or dispose of church property (Canon XXII). It stated however that bishops should not ordain slaves, and that a slave who was freed should not be ordained without the consent of his former master (Canon VI). It threatened with excommunication all who embezzled or appropriated funds given by King Childebert for the foundation of a hospital of Lyon (Canon XV), and it placed lepers under the special charge of each bishop.

The Council ruled that if any cleric of any degree should return to the marriage bed, he should be deprived of his clerical Order and his office, but that communion must be administered to him (Canon IV).

It forbade priests from suspending persons from Holy Communion for small and trivial reasons, and ordered that they should adhere to the traditional rules of the Church Fathers (Canon II).

=== Cannon of the Council ===
The minutes of the council are 24 canons.

1. The first canon of the council pronounced an anathema against the errors of Nestorius and Eutyches. The council seems to have feared that the troubles that appeared in the East and aroused by the Nestorians and Eutychians do not spread in the West.
2. The second canon prohibits bishops from excommunicating for light causes.
3. The third canon prohibits clerics from having at home foreign women or relatives at undue hours, which can create bad suspicions.
4. The fourth canon commands the clergy to live in continence, even with their lawful wives.
5. The fifth canon prohibits bishops from ordering clerics from another diocese without the consent of the bishop of the latter diocese.
6. The sixth canon prohibits bishops from ordering slaves or freedmen without the consent of their master.
7. The seventh canon forbids the slavery of enslaved slaves in the church, unless they have committed marked faults in the law.
8. The eighth canon forbids the bishops to ordain clerics during the vacancy of the episcopal see.
9. The ninth canon forbids a bishop to be consecrated if he has not belonged to the clergy for at least a year.
10. The tenth canon forbids simony and buying the episcopate by money. He has prescribed that the election of bishops be conducted with complete freedom, with the consent of the clergy, the people, and the king.
11. The eleventh canon prohibits imposing on the people a bishop whom he has not accepted. Otherwise the ordained bishop will be deposed.
12. The twelfth canon forbids the ordination of a bishop in the place of a living bishop, if he is not deposed as a capital crime.
13. The thirteenth canon prohibits the taking of bequeathed goods to churches, monasteries and hospitals.
14. The fourteenth canon extends this prohibition to bishops, clerics, and laymen in relation to the property of the Church.
15. The fifteenth canon confirms the foundation of a hospital in Lyon by Childebert and it is forbidden to the bishop of Lyon and his successors to claim some property from this hospital.
16. The sixteenth canon pronounces anathema against anyone who dares to deprive the churches of the donations made to them.
17. The seventeenth canon deals with disputes between a person and a bishop.
18. The eighteenth canon suspends for six months any bishop who refuses to come to a council or to leave before the end, except for obvious infirmity.
19. The nineteenth canon deals with the entry of girls into monasteries and the conditions of taking the religious habit.
20. The twentieth canon says that prisoners for any crime whatsoever will be visited every Sunday by the archdeacon.
21. The twenty-first canon indicates that the bishops will take special care of the lepers in their diocese by providing clothing and food.
22. The twenty-second canon renews the regulations concerning slaves who take refuge in the church.
23. The twenty-third canon ordains the annual council of the province.
24. The twenty-fourth canon confirms the preceding decrees.

== Bibliography ==
- Halfond, Gregory I. (2010). Archaeology of Frankish Church Councils, AD 511-768. Boston-Leiden: Brill. ISBN 978-90-04-17976-9.
- Hefele, Carl Joseph (1895). A History of the Councils of the Church, from the Original Documents. By the Right Rev. Charles Joseph Hefele ... Vol. IV. A.D. 451 to A.D. 680. Edinburgh: T. & T. Clark.
- Maassen, Friedrich (1989). Concilia Aevi Merovingici: 511-695 (in German). Hannover: Impensis Bibliopolii Hahniani. ISBN 978-3-7752-5061-0.
- Mansi, J.-D. (ed.), Sacrorum Conciliorum nova et amplissima collectio editio novissima Tomus IX (Florence 1763).
