= Verecundus of Junca =

Verecundus (fl. 552) was a 6th-century writer and the bishop of Iunca (or Junca) in Roman North Africa (the modern Tunisia). He was an ardent champion of the Three Chapters.

== Life ==
Verecundus attended the Synod in Constantinople of 551 called by Justinian where he sided with Pope Vigilius in the Three-Chapter Controversy and went into self-imposed exile with him at the end of the synod for refusing to sign the condemnation of Theodore of Mopsuestia, Theodoret of Cyrrhus and Ibas of Edessa.

When the question of the Three Chapters was raised at the Council of Chalcedon, in the beginning of 552. Pope Vigilius's Judicatum having excited almost universal discontent, both the pope and the Emperor Justinian agreed the question should be settled in a general council to be held at Constantinople. Verecundus, with Primasius of Hadrumeta, went to represent the Province of Byzacena, and arrived at Constantinople towards the middle of 551. At once the Greek bishops set out to induce them by promises and threats to anathematize the Three Chapters. Both resisted strenuously at first, and, in the grave difficulties then besetting Pope Vigilius, stood by his side; and when the latter had taken refuge in the Basilica of St. Peter's, both, in union with him, issued a sentence of excommunication against Theodore Askidas and of deposition against Mennas, the patriarch of Constantinople (17 August, 551). Soon, however, the conditions became so unbearable that on 23 December Pope Vigilius, although his residence was carefully watched, managed to escape across the Bosphorus and to reach the Church of St. Euphemia at Chalcedon. Primasius and Verecundus followed him a few days later.

Verecundus died shortly afterwards. After Verecundus's death, Primasius was moved by ambition to relent from his unyielding attitude.

== Ecclesiastical writer ==
As an ecclesiastical author, Verecundus is little known. His works, edited by J. B. Pitra (Spicilegium Solesmense, IV, Paris, 1858), comprise a collection of historical documents on the Council of Chalcedon, "Excerptiones de gestis Chalcedonensis Concilii", of which two recensions survive; an exegetical commentary in nine books upon the Canticles of the Old Testament, the poem Carmen de satisfactione ( "De satisfactione poenitentiae") in 212 hexameters, and possibly another, the Carmen ad Flavium Felicem de resurrectione mortuorum et de iudicio domini.

Verecundus also wrote excerpts of the proceedings of the Council of Chalcedon.

Isidore of Seville (De vir. ill., vii) attributes to Verecundus another poem on resurrection and judgment, which is possibly none other than the "De iudicio Domini" or "De resurrectione mortuorum", found among the works of Tertullian and Cyprian.

== Bibliography ==
- Bardenhewer, Patrology, tr. Shahan (St. Louis, 1908);
- Hefele, Conciliengeschichte; Fr. tr. Leclercq, III (Paris, 1909), ii, 41 sq.
