= Abundius the Sacristan =

Sacristan of the Church of Saint Peter (d. c. 564)

Saint Abundius the Sacristan

Sacristan
- Born: unknown
- Died: c. 564; Rome, Italy
- Venerated in: Roman Catholic Church
- Feast: 14 April

Saint Abundius the Sacristan (also Abonde, or, variously, Acontius) (died c. 564) was a sacristan of the Church of Saint Peter in Rome.

== Life ==
His holy life was reportedly an inspiration to all who knew him, and several miracles were attributed to him. For one, he is reported as having miraculously healed someone of gout by his prayers.

Another story of a miraculous healing by Abundius is told by Saint Gregory the Great in his Dialogues (Book III, Chapter 25). Gregory reports that there was a young woman who was suffering from palsy, and had been praying to Saint Peter to be healed. The saint appeared to her in a vision and told her to go to Abundius to be healed. The woman did not know Abundius, but sought him out at the basilica and engaged in the following conversation with him:

The maid [...] suddenly met with him whom she sought for; and asking for him of himself, he told her that he was Abundius. Then quoth she: 'Our pastor and patron, blessed St. Peter the Apostle, hath sent me, that you should help me of this my disease.' 'If you be sent by him,' quoth Abundius, 'then rise up': and taking her by the hand, he forthwith lifted her up upon her feet: and from that very hour, all the sinews and parts of her body became so strong, that no sign of her former malady remained.

In the same work, Gregory also makes note of another saintly sacristan of Saint Peter's, Theodore, who was contemporaneous to Abundius.

== Veneration ==
The Roman Martyrology lists Abundius briefly on his feast day, April 14, which is kept as a feast at Saint Peter's.

Romæ sancti Abúndii, Mansionárii Ecclésiæ sancti Petri.
At Rome, St. Abundius, sacristan of the church of Saint Peter.
