= Peter Plaoul =

Peter Plaoul (1353–1415; Latin: Petrus Plaoul, French: Pierre Plaoul) was a late medieval Scholastic philosopher and theologian. Born in Liege, he was educated at the University of Paris and remained an active member of the University until he was made Bishop of Senlis in 1409.

While the content of his thought remains relatively unknown, Plaoul is often noted for his role in ending the Great Schism. He was present at the three French clergy councils in the 1390s called by King Charles the VI. There he advocated for the withdrawal of obedience from the Avignon Pope. He was also a speaker at the Council of Pisa, where the members attempted to end the schism by electing a third pope. Peter became sick and died before he could take part in the Council of Constance, which finally brought an end to the schism.
