= Council of Orléans (1478) =

The council of 1477 or 1478, also known as the "Assembly of the clergy of France", was a synod of French Bishops of the Roman Catholic Church, summoned by King Louis XI. Its primary object was to arrange a holy war against the Ottoman Empire.
