= Cormac Ua Liatháin =

6th-century Irish saint

Cormac Ua Liatháin was a 6th-century Irish saint who is only known from Adomnan of Iona's Vita Columbae.

In Adomnan's narrative, Cormac is mentioned three times. He is described as an anchorite who searches for islands on which to live as a hermit in prayer. It is also said that he is a founder of monasteries.

On the first occasion, Columba prophesied that Cormac had just set sail from the district of Erris beyond the river Moy that day to find a place of retreat but found none. Columba said that God would not allow him to find one because he was travelling with a monk who was away without his abbot's permission.

On the second occasion, Cormac made a second attempt to find a place of refuge by sailing off into the sea. Columba prophetically knew all about this, and, being in Pictland with King Bridei I at the time and knowing that Cormac would find his way to the Orkney islands, which at the time were a sub-kingdom under the Picts, requested that the King should make sure that if any of his brethren came to the Orkney islands, they would be treated well. Bridei obeyed the request and when Cormac actually arrived there, he was protected from harm. According to the narrative, a few months later the monks at Iona were talking about Cormac and whether his voyage had succeeded, and Columba told them that Cormac would arrive at Iona that day, and he then did arrive just as the saint foretold. It is not clear from the narrative whether this meant he only spent a few months in Orkney in total, or if he later went back to Orkney after visiting Iona.

According to the narrative, however, Cormac also made a third journey into the ocean to find a place of refuge. His ship was driven by a steady southerly wind for fourteen days which pushed him very far to the north. Then his boat was attacked by a large swarm of frog-sized flightless insects. Cormac feared they might puncture the skin covering of the boat and prayed to God. Columba, who was present in spirit, was aware of what was happening and he called his monks to come and pray together for Cormac. In answer to these prayers, God then reversed the wind and made it send them back to the south. Cormac then came to see Columba again.

On the third occasion, Cormac along with three other Irish saints (St Cainnech, St Comgall and St Brendan the Navigator) came to visit Columba and found him on the island of Hinba. They chose St Columba to be the celebrant at mass and during mass, Brendan saw a ball of radiant fire over Columba's head.

== Bibliography ==
- Adomnan of Iona (1995). Life of St Columba. Penguin Books. ISBN 978-0-14-190741-3. OCLC 35279286
