= Eleutherius of Auxerre =

St. Eleutherius was a 6th-century Bishop of Auxerre in France and Pre-congregational Saint, who attended four Councils of Orléans between 533 and 549.

His feast day is 26 August.
