= Ancient Diocese of Senlis =

Roman Catholic diocese in France (c. 6 century - 1801)

Coordinates: 49.21°N 2.59°E

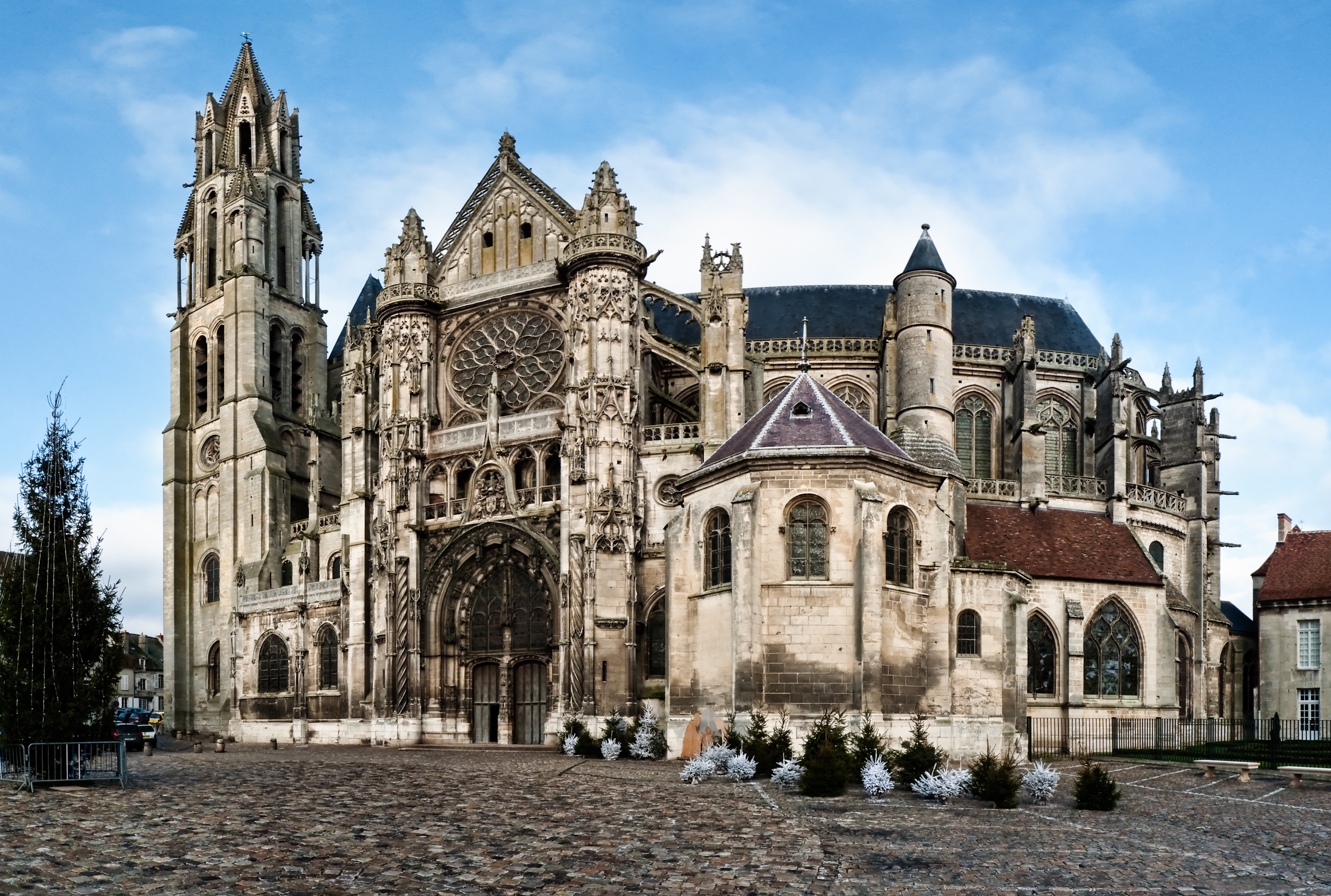
Senlis Cathedral

The former French Catholic diocese of Senlis existed from the sixth century, at least, to the French Revolution. Its see was at Senlis, in the modern department of Oise, in northern France.

It was suppressed by the Concordat of 1801, its territory passing to the diocese of Beauvais.

== History ==
Rieul of Senlis is considered the first bishop, probably around the early fourth century. The first cathedral was built in the late 4th or early 5th century, within the perimeter of the city walls. According to Alban Butler, Liudhard (Léthard) was chaplain of the Frankish princess Bertha, and resigned the see in order to accompany her to Britain when she married Æthelberht of Kent.

Gregory of Tours says that when king Chilperic I was assassinated, he was deserted by his people who had no love for him, however, when Bishop Maculphe heard of the king's death, he set out to take the king's body and had it buried in the Church of Saint Vincent in Paris. Ursion was Chancellor of France in 1090, as was his successor, Hubert, in 1091.

Construction of the Cathédrale Notre-Dame de Senlis was started around 1151 on the site of older sanctuaries, under Bishop Pierre.

== Bishops ==
=== To 1000 ===
- Saint Rieul (Regulus)
- Nicenus (?)
- Mansuetus (?)
- Venustus (?)
- Tanitus (?)
- Jocundus (?)
- Protatus (or Protritus) (?)
- Modestus (?)
- c. 511-513: Saint Levain (Levangius, Livanianus)
- 513-519: Passif (Passivus)
- 519-547: Nonnullus
- Hodiernus (Fredigernus, Frodigerius) (?)
- c. 549-c. 557: Heiliger Gonotigerne (or Gonotigernus)
- Saint Sanctin (Sanctinus)
- Saint Léthard, c. 580
- Saint Maculphe (or Malulfus) c. 584
- Saint Candide (or Candidus) (?) sixth century
- 625-c. 649: Saint Agomer (or Agmarus)
- 652-c. 685: Saint Ausbert (or Autbertus)
- Saint Amand(us)
- c. 767-c.769: Saint Erembert (or Erambertus)
- Saint Wulfrède (Vulfredus)
- Antalfrède (Antalfridus, Amalsindus)
- Bertolinus (Bethelmus)
- Odovinus (Odonius, Idoinus)
- Adelbert (Adalbertus)
- Renaut (Ragnaldus, Reginaldus)
- 813-816: Ermenon (or Erminus)
- 829-838: Gottfried I (or Godofredus)
- 840-871: Herpoin (or Herpuinus)
- 871-897: Aubert (Hadebertus, Audebertus)
- 899 or 900-909: Otfrid (or Othfredus)
- 918 or 923-936: Adelelone (or Adelelmus)
- 937-?: Bernuin(us)
- Guntbertus (?)
- c. 948: Ivo I. (or Yves)
- 965 or 972: Constance (or Constantius)
- 987 or 989-993: Eudes I. (or Odo)
- 996 or 998: Robert I. (or Robertus)

=== 1000 to 1300 ===
- 1015: Raoul I. (or Rodulph(us))
- 1021 or 1022-1027: Guy I. le Bon (or Guido)
- 1029: Raoul II. (or Rodulphus)
- 1030-1042: Guy II. (or Guido)
- 1043-1053: Frotland(us) I.
- 1058: Guy III. (or Guido)
- 1059-1067: Frotland(us) II.
- 1067 or 1068-1069: Eudes II. (or Odo)
- 1072 or 1074-1075: Rolland(us)
- 1075 or 1076: Ingelran (or Ingelardus)
- 1076 or 1077-1079: Ivo II. (or Yves)
- 1081 or 1082-1093: Ursion (or Ursio or Ursus), Chancellor of France
- 1091 or 1091-1095: Hubert (or Hugues)
- 1095 or 1097-1099: Liétaud (or Letaldus)
- 1099-1115: Hubert(us)
- 1115 or 1117-1133: Clérembaut (or Clarembaldus)
- 1134-8. April 1151: Pierre I. (or Petrus)
- 1151-1154: Thibaud (or Theobaldus)
- 1155 or 1156-1167: Amaury (or Amauricus)
- 1168 or 1169-1185: Henri(cus)
- 1185-1213: Geoffroy II. (or Gaufridus)
- 1213 or 1214-18. April 1227: Guérin (or Garinus), Chancellor of France
- 1227 or 1228-20. August 1258: Adam de Chambly
- 1259-1 October 1260: Robert II. de La Houssaye
- 1260-1283: Robert III. de Cressonsart
- 1287-1288: Gautier de Chambly et Nuilly (or Gualterus)
- 1290 or 1291-1293 or 1294: Pierre II. Cailleau (or Petrus Cailleu or Chaillou)
- 1292 or 1294-9 May 1308: Guy IV. de Plailly (or Guido)

=== 1300-1500 ===
- 1308 or 1309-1313: Guillaume I. de Baron (or Guilielmus de Berrone)
- 5 November 1314 – 1334: Pierre III. de Baron (or Petrus Barrière)
- c. 1335-1337: Vast de Villiers (Vedastus de Villaribus)
- 1337-1339: Etienne de Villiers (Stephanus de Villaribus)
- 1339-27. August 1344: Robert IV. de Plailly
- 31. August 1344 – 1349: Pierre IV. de Cros
- 1349-1351: Denys I. le Grand (or Dionysus)
- 1351-1356: Pierre V. de Treigny
- c. 1356 (?): Pierre VI. de Proverville (?)
- 1356-1377: Adam de Nemours
- c. 1377-c. 1379: Martin (oder Martinus)
- c. 1379-c. 1380: Pierre VII. (or Petrus)
- 1380-8 September 1409: Jean I. Dieudonné (Joannes Dodieu)
- 2 October 1409 – 11 April 1415: Peter Plaoul, (Pierre Plaoul)
- 10 May 1415 – 12 June 1418: Jean II d'Archery (Joannes Dachery)
- 23 June 1418-23 November (?) 1422: Pierre IX. de Chissey
- 14 May 1423 – 12 October 1429: Jean III. Fouquerel
- 20. April 1432 or 1433-6. Mai 1434: Guillaume II de Hottot (or Guiliemus de Hotot)
- 1434-1447: Jean IV. Raphanel
- 4 May 1447 – 1496: Simon Bonnet
- 26 September 1496 – 3 March 1499: Jean V. Neveu
- 11. April 1499-29. August 1515: Charles de Blanchefort

=== From 1500 ===
- 1515-1517: Nicolas I. de Sains
- 1 February 1517 – 1522: Jean VI. Calvi (or Joannes Calueau)
- 1522-27 August 1526: Artus Fillon (or Arturius)
- 1527: Oudart Hennequin (or Odardus)
- 29 March 1528-8. December 1536: Guillaume III. Petit (or Guilielmus Parvi)
- 8. January 1537-14. September 1559: René Le Roullier (or Renatus Le Rouillé)
- 27 March 1560 – 13 June 1560: Crespin de Brichanteau (or Crispinus)
- 17 July 1560 – 1561: Louis Guillart (or Ludovicus)
- 19 September 1561 – 30 October 1583: Pierre X. Le Chevalier
- 6 May 1584 – 1602: Guillaume IV Rose
- 24 March 1602 – 15 March 1610: Antoine Rose
- 1610-1622: Cardinal François de La Rochefoucauld
- 19 September 1622 – 15 July 1652: Nicolas II Sanguin
- 14 January 1653 – 13 March 1702: Denys II Sanguin (or Dionysus)
- 16 April 1702-1. April 1714: Jean-François de Chamillart
- 25 November 1714 – 4 January 1754: François-Firmin Trudaine (or Firminus)
- 16 June 1754 – 21 September 1801: Jean-Armand de Bessuéjouls de Roquelaure

== See also ==
- Catholic Church in France
- List of Catholic dioceses in France

== Bibliography ==
=== Sources ===
- Gams, Pius Bonifatius (1873). Series episcoporum Ecclesiae catholicae: quotquot innotuerunt a beato Petro apostolo. Ratisbon: Typis et Sumptibus Georgii Josephi Manz. pp. 548–549. (Use with caution; obsolete)
- Eubel, Conradus, ed. (1913). Hierarchia catholica, Tomus 1 (second ed.). Münster: Libreria Regensbergiana. p. 301. (in Latin)
- Eubel, Conradus, ed. (1914). Hierarchia catholica, Tomus 2 (second ed.). Münster: Libreria Regensbergiana. p. 175.
- Eubel, Conradus, ed. (1923). Hierarchia catholica, Tomus 3 (second ed.). Münster: Libreria Regensbergiana.
- Gauchat, Patritius (Patrice) (1935). Hierarchia catholica IV (1592-1667). Münster: Libraria Regensbergiana. p. 219.
- Ritzler, Remigius; Sefrin, Pirminus (1952). Hierarchia catholica medii et recentis aevi V (1667-1730). Patavii: Messagero di S. Antonio.

=== Studies ===
- Jean, Armand (1891). Les évêques et les archevêques de France depuis 1682 jusqu'à 1801 (in French). Paris: A. Picard.
- Pisani, Paul (1907). Répertoire biographique de l'épiscopat constitutionnel (1791-1802) (in French). Paris: A. Picard et fils.
