= Ethel Houbiers =

Belgian actress (born 1973)

- Born: 14 July 1973 (age 53); Liège, Belgium
- Occupation: Actress

Ethel Houbiers (born 14 July 1973) is a Belgian actress specializing in dubbing.

== Filmography ==
- Les moissons de l'océan (1998) (TV)
- Véga (1999) (TV series)
- On vous rappellera (2000) (TV)
- Almodis de la Marche (2002) (TV)

== Theatre ==
- Letters From My Windmill, 1995
- The Seven Who Were Hanged, 1995
- Jeux de Massacre (Various), 1995
- La nuit enchantée (Fairy), 1995
- Le fils de Rullier (Various), 1995
- Chemin Lilas (Naïri), 1996
- Cendrillon (Fairy), 1996
- La nuit tombe sur Alger la blanche (Ouarda), 1996
- L'homo européanus c'est moi (Belgian), 1997
- Madame de Sade (Mme de Saint-Fond), 1997
- Le sous-vide et le manger mou, 1997
- La dernière horde, 1997
- Portrait de femme avec ombres (Monologue), 1998
- Lit nuptial (Friend), Espace Kiron, 1997–1998
- La modernité ça fait du bruit (Juliette), 1998
- Escrache- Sratch (Natalia), 1998
- Exercices de Colère (Woman), 1998
- Letter from an Unknown Woman (Unknown Woman), Sudden Théâtre/Théâtre Hébertot, 1998–2002
- Les Fourberies de Scapin (Zerbinette), 1999
- Coupable d'innocence (Monologue), 1999
- Lettre de Jean Racine au sujet de Phèdre (Phèdre), 1999
- Le Médecin malgré lui (Jacqueline), 2000
- Souvenirs d'un européen (Lotte Altman), 2000
- The Seagull (Nina), 2001
- Copie tordue (Girl), 2001
- Conversation avec mon chien (Monologue), 2002–2003
- La Musica, deuxième, Théâtre de l'opprimé, 2004
- On s'voyait déjà, Théâtre Michel Galabru, 2003–2005

== French dubbing ==
=== Cinema ===
- Carla's Song (1995) - Carla
- Breaking Up (1997) - Monica
- The Girl of Your Dreams (1998) - Macarena Granada
- Scarfies (1999) - Emma
- Traffic (2000) - Rosario
- Bread and Roses (2000) - Maya
- The Art of War (2000) - Julia Fang
- Woman on Top (2000) - Isabelle Oliveira
- The Wedding Planner (2001) - Mary Fiore
- Tortilla Soup (2001) - Carmen Naranjo
- Joy Ride (2001) - Venna
- Blow (2001) - Mirtha Jung
- Waking Up in Reno (2002) - Brenda
- Ali G Indahouse (2002) - Kate Hedges
- Star Wars: Episode II – Attack of the Clones (2002) - Queen Jamillia
- The Sum of All Fears (2002) - Dr. Cathy Muller
- The Life of David Gale (2003) - Berlin
- A Man Apart (2003) - Stacy Vetter
- Gothika (2003) - Chloé Sava
- The Terminal (2004) - Torres
- The Princess Diaries 2: Royal Engagement (2004) - Miss Genovia Hildegard
- Jersey Girl (2004) - Gertrude Steiney
- Head in the Clouds (2004) - Mia
- Van Helsing (2004) - Anna Valérius
- The Day After Tomorrow (2004) - Jama
- Meet the Fockers (2004) - Isabelle Villalobos
- Four Brothers (2005) - Sofi
- American Gangster (2007) - Eva
- Vicky Cristina Barcelona (2007) - Maria Elena
- Vantage Point (2008) - Veronica / Marie
- Nine (2009) - Carla
- Sex and the City 2 (2010) - Lydia
- Cop Out (2010) - Gabriela
- Grown Ups (2010) - Roxanne Chase-Feder
- The Expendables (2010) - Sandra
- Pirates of the Caribbean: On Stranger Tides (2011) - Angelica Teach
- To Rome with Love (2012) - Anna
- Savages (2012) - Elena
- The Counselor (2013) - Laura
- Fading Gigolo (2013) - Selima
- Last Vegas (2014) - Lisa

=== Animated film roles ===
- Atlantis: The Lost Empire (2001) - Audrey Ramirez
- Atlantis: Milo's Return (2003) - Audrey Ramirez
- Bee Movie (2007) - Human voice
- Monsters vs. Aliens (2009) - Computer voice

=== Television ===
- Uprising (2001) - Tosia Altman
- Carnivàle (2003) - Catalina de la Rosa
- The Knights of Prosperity (2007) - Esperanza Villalobos
- Dirty Sexy Money (2007–2009) - Sofia Montoya
- Total Drama: Revenge of the Island (2011) - Anne-Maria

=== Video game roles ===
- Red Faction
- Red Faction II
- Red Faction: Guerrilla
- Wheelman

=== Advertisements ===
- Basiq Air
- Bossa Nova
- CNP Assurances
- Costa Cruises
- Cuir Center
- Favela Chic
- LCM Lacôme
- Mercedez
- L'Oréal
- SEAT
