= Third Council of Orléans =

Synod of French bishops in 538 AD

The third council of national stature, or third Council of Orléans, was a synod of the Catholic bishops of France. It opened around 7 May 538 and was presided over by Loup, Archbishop of Lyon. It established mainly:

- Sunday as day of the Lord;
- prohibition of field work on Sundays;
- prohibition of clerics practicing usury;
- prohibition of the conjuring of priests, as a critic of their bishop (canon 24, recall of canon 18 of the Council of Chalcedon, 451).
- The bishop must redeem a Christian slave in the service of a Jew if he takes refuge in the church, while the constitutions of the Lower Roman Empire demanded to return them to their master, withovut further guarantees.

A conciliabule, of which we do not know the subject, took place in Orleans in 540.
