= Desideratus =

St. Desideratus
- Born: Soissons
- Died: May 8, 550
- Venerated in: Roman Catholic Church
- Canonized: Pre-congregation
- Feast: May 8

Desideratus (died 550) was a Frankish saint from Soissons in the Christian church.

Desideratus came from a family of saints, as his father, Auginus, mother, Agia, and brothers Desiderius and Deodatus, were all canonized. The parents taught the boys to care for the poor and to use their possessions to aid others.

Desideratus became chancellor for King Clotaire and sought to eliminate simony and heresy in Clotaire's lands. He became archdeacon at Bourges. Desideratus wished to retire to a monastery but Clotaire argued that he should put the needs of his subjects ahead of himself. In 549 he succeeded Arcadius as Bishop of Bourges. As bishop he often mediated disputes in the region and managed to reconcile Anjou and Poitou, who had been in conflict.

At the fifth Council of Orleans and second Council of Auvergne, he combated Nestorianism. He died on May 8, 550. May 8 is his feast day.

St. Desideratus is invoked for rain.
