= Council of Orléans =

The Council of Orléans may refer to any of several synods held in Orléans:

- First Council of Orléans (511)
- Second Council of Orléans (533)
- Third Council of Orléans (538)
- Fourth Council of Orléans (541)
- Fifth Council of Orléans (549)
- Council of Orléans (621)
- Council of Orléans (1022)
- Council of Orléans (1127)
- Council of Orléans (1478)
- Council of Orléans (1510)
