= Guillaume de Thurey =

French bishop (c. 1326-1365)

Guillaume Thurey, (c. 1326, Burgundy – 12 May 1365) was a French bishop. He was successively canon–Count of Lyon in 1336, Bishop of Autun in 1351, then Archbishop of Lyon in 1358. He was the uncle of Philippe III de Thurey, Archbishop of Lyon.

== Career ==
In 1348 William of Thurey founded, with his brother, Girard, a chapel in the church of Cuisery.

In 1349 he accompanied Henry de Villars, Archbishop of Lyon, to get and escort Charles, Dauphin of France.

In 1358 he was made Archbishop of Lyon. He was chosen as the Thurey family had been strong supporters of the king.

In 1358, he sent a contingent under the command of his brother Girard Thurey against the Tard-Venus bandits who had occupied Pont-Saint-Esprit. For this he was thanked by Pope Innocent VI.

He died on 12 May 1365 and is buried at Lyon in the sanctuary of St. John's Church.
