= Henri de Villars =

Henri de Villars may refer to:

- Henri de Villars (died 1354), French prelate
- Henri de Villars (died 1693) (c. 1621–1693), French prelate
