= Etherius =

French saint and Bishop of Lyon (d. 602)

Etherius (Latin: Ætherius) was Bishop of Lyon, successor of Priscus (who died about 586). Etherius died in 602 and is venerated as a saint in the Catholic Church, celebrated locally on October 7. He is notable as the bishop who consecrated Augustine of Canterbury to go to England.

== Early life ==
He belonged to the senatorial aristocracy, and before his episcopate was an officer of the court of King Gontran, of which he was one of the closest advisers. His predecessor Nicetius of Lyon († 573), who appreciated his company, would have predicted that he would succeed him, but only secondly. It was Gontran who initially refused him this succession, in spite of the desire expressed by the people of Lyon. Prisque and his wife Suzanne, whom he had kept with him, demonstrated during their reign their hatred of Bishop Nizier and persecuted his former relatives. Eterna, when Gontran had allowed him to succeed Prisque, put the memory of Nizier in honor, organized his cult, and in particular wrote shortly after his accession an Abridged Life of Saint Nizier, or Praise of Saint Nicetius. In particular, a resting bed belonging to the saint became a miraculous object.

== Bishopric ==
Etherius was associated with Austresile (or Outrille), also an officer at the court of Gontran, who had addressed himself to him, an adviser much listened to, to obtain from the king permission to enter the clergy. As soon as he was bishop, Etherius summoned Ausgesilus to Lyons, ordained him a priest, and made him the abbot of the chapter, serving the church which had become basilica of St. Nizier, assigning him a vineyard called Albiacus.

In 589, there was a mutiny in the Sainte-Croix Abbey of Poitiers, founded by Queen Radegonde († 587): forty sisters, led by Clothilde, daughter of Caribert I, and Basine, daughter of Chilperic I, left the convent by demanding the resignation of the abbess Leubovère; Clothilde went to find his uncle Gontran. Back in Poitiers, the rebels barricaded themselves in the basilica of Saint-Hilaire with an armed men's troop. The Metropolitan Gondigesile of Bordeaux personally came to excommunicate them, but he and the group of bishops and clerics who accompanied him were badly molested by the companions of the rebels and had to run away, sometimes with their heads in blood. The Bishop Gondégésile then wrote, in the name of the group, to his Burgundian colleagues assembled in the palace of King Gontran, who replied with a letter reproduced by Gregory of Tours, Ether of Lyon being the first signatory.

In 591, King Gontran sent to Paris several bishops of his kingdom (Éthère de Lyon, Syagre d'Autun, Flavius de Chalon), and followed them there shortly after.

On 23 July 597 the pope wrote to Etherius to recommend to him the monk Augustine and his companions, whom he sent to evangelize England. Bede the Venerable, who reproduces this letter (Ecclesiastical History of the English People, I, 24), makes a mistake, because he entitled Éthère "Archbishop of Arles" 12. After a first stay in Kent, Augustine returned to Gaul and was made "Archbishop of the Angles" by Ether (I, 27).

In 1975, the German historian Hubert Mordek recognized Éthère as the most likely author of the oldest systematic collection of ecclesiastical canons in Frankish Gaul, the Collectio Vetus Gallica.

According to the Chronicle of Fredegarius, he died the seventh year of the reign of King Thierry II, in 602.
