= Rusticus (archbishop of Lyon) =

Catholic saint and Archbishop of Lyon (d. 494)

Saint Rusticus (c. 455 – 25 April 501), the successor of Saint Lupicinus of Lyon (491-494), served as Archbishop of Lyon from 494 to April 501. Later canonized and venerated in the Catholic Church, his feast day is 25 April.

== Family ==
He and his brother St. Viventiolus were the sons of Aquilinus (c. 430-c. 470), a nobleman at Lyon. Aquilinus was the son of Tullia (born 410), the daughter of Saint Eucherius and his wife Gallia. Tullia's husband, whose name is unknown, was the son of Decimus Rusticus and his wife Artemia, and was a vicarius of a province in Gaul between 423 and 448 under Apollinaris, the father of Aquilinus' schoolfellow and friend, Sidonius Apollinaris (c. 400).

== Bishop ==
Rusticus served for many years as a magistrate. Around 494 he succeeded Lupicinus of Lyon as bishop. Shortly after his consecration, Rusticus sent some financial aid to Pope Gelasius I. Gelasius wrote back in February 494, recommending to the bishop's good offices Epiphanius of Pavia, who was on his way to Gaul to see to the ransom of certain captives held by the Burgundian king Gundobad. According to Ennodius, among those freed were 400 from Lyon.

== Marriage and issue ==
Married before 480 to Hiberie de Limoges (born c. 460), daughter of Ruricius, Bishop of Limoges (then Augustoritum) and his wife Hiberia, daughter of an Arvernian senator Ommatius. Rusticus and his wife had three children:

- St. Sacerdos, Archbishop of Lyon
  - Aurelianus of Arles
- Leontius, Archbishop of Lyon
- Artemia, the wife of Florentinus, born in 485, a senator, who were the parents of:
  - Gondulf of Provence, Duke, Bishop of Metz
  - Arthemia, wife of Munderic Vitrey, Pretender of Austrasia.
  - St. Nicetius, Archbishop of Lyon

== Sources ==
- Sidonius Apollinaris, The Letters of Sidonius (Oxford: Clarendon, 1915) (orig.), pp. clx-clxxxiii; List of Correspondents, Notes, V.ix.1.

Catholic Church titles
Preceded by Lupicinus	Archbishop of Lyon; 494–501	Succeeded by Stephanus
