= Annemund =

7th-century Archbishop of Lyon and Catholic saint

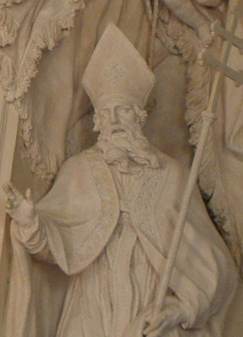
- Ennemond
- Died: 657 or 658
- Venerated in: Catholic Church
- Feast: September 28

Saint Annemund, also known as Annemundus, Aunemundus, Ennemond and Chamond, was an archbishop of the Archdiocese of Lyon. Annemund was a councillor of Clovis II and a friend of Wilfrid of York. The year of his death is variously given as either 657 or 658. He is venerated as a saint in the Catholic Church.

== Biography ==
Ennemond Dauphin (Dalfinus) succeeded Viventius as bishop of Lyon between 652 and 654 during the reign of Clovis II.

His father, Sigon, was a prefect in Lyon, while his brother, Dalfin, was Count of Lyons. Late hagiographic texts say his was a Gallo-Roman family, although his name is of German origin, more common in the Burgundian late 5th century. These same texts record that Dauphin's brother was prefect of Gaul. The accounts of his contemporaries Eddius Stephanus (in) and the Venerable Bede however, make no mention of his brother.

Annemund was a councillor of Clovis II and a friend of Wilfrid. Tradition attributes to him the evangelization of the Saint-Chamond area (Castellum Sancti Admundi), whose church still contains one of his relics.

He was the victim of a plot by the mayor of the palace, Ebroin. According to Bede, this occurred at the order of Queen Balthild. Having been unable to attend a gathering of Frankish officials at Orleans, he was slandered as a traitor to the king. Summoned to court, he was beheaded on September 29, 658 near Chalon-sur-Saône by parties affiliated with Ebroin. His body was brought back to Lyon and is in the Saint-Nizier Church. Genesius succeeded him as Bishop.

== Legacy ==
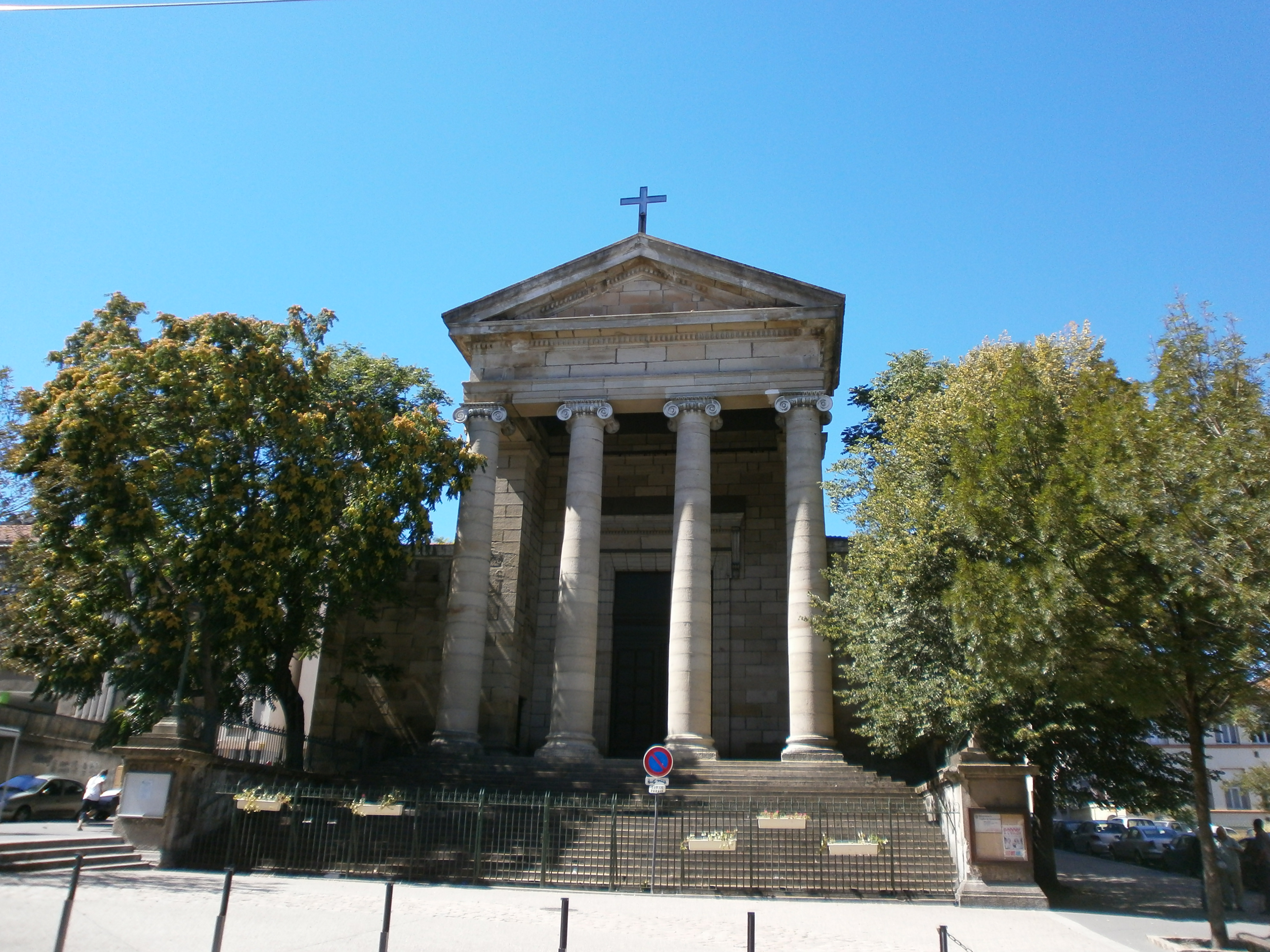
Church of Saint-Ennemond.

Ennemond is also revered in Bellegarde-en-Forez and Champdieu. He gave his name to the town of Saint-Ennemond in Allier and Saint-Chamond in the Loire area. One of his relics is preserved in the Church of Saint-Ennemond, Saint-Étienne.

He is enrolled in the Roman martyrology and his feast day is celebrated on 28 September.

It is said that it was Ennemond who first conceived the idea of calling the faithful to church by ringing church bells. Similarly, when his body was returned to Lyon, all churches would have started ringing their bells.

A statue in the Saint-Ennemond church Saint-Étienne is in episcopal robes, holding a codex of the Bible.

Catholic Church titles
Preceded by Viventius	Archbishop of Lyon c. 653 – 658	Succeeded by Genesius
