= Priscus (disambiguation) =

Priscus is the Latin word for "ancient" or "venerable." It is an ancient Roman praenomen, cognomen, given name and epithet. People so named include:

== Praenomen or given name ==
- Priscus (410s/420s–after 472), Eastern Roman diplomat and Greek historian and rhetorician
- Priscus Attalus (died after 416), Roman senator and twice usurper
- Priscus of Epirus (c. 305–c. 395), Greek philosopher and friend of Emperor Julian
- Priscus of Lyon, Bishop of Lyon from 573 to sometime between 585 and 589
- Priscus (gladiator) (fl. 80), Roman gladiator
- Priscus (magister militum) (died 613), Byzantine general
- Priscus (saint), several Catholic saints and martyrs
- Priscus Fogagnolo (born 1983), Australian martial artist and Greco-Roman wrestler

== Cognomen or other ==
- Cato the Elder (234–149 BC), Roman historian, senator and soldier with the cognomen or epithet Priscus
- Aulus Larcius Priscus, 1st-2nd century Roman senator, governor of Syria and general
- Caerellius Priscus, governor of several Roman provinces, including Roman Britain in the 170s
- Clutorius Priscus (c. 20 BC–21 AD), Roman poet
- Decimus Junius Novius Priscus, Roman senator, consul in 78
- Gaius Julius Priscus, 3rd-century Roman Praetorian guard, brother of Emperor Phillip the Arab, prefect of Mesopotamia and procurator of Macedonia
- Gaius Octavius Tidius Tossianus Lucius Javolenus Priscus, Roman senator, consul in 86 and jurist
- Helvidius Priscus, 1st-century Roman philosopher, quaestor of Achaea and tribune of the plebs
- Iavolenus Priscus, 1st-century Roman jurist
- Lucius Neratius Priscus (fl. c. 79–105), Roman senator, governor of Germania Inferior, governor of Pannonia, quaestor, plebeian tribune, praetor and suffect consul
- Lucius Tarquinius Priscus (reigned c. 616–578 BC), legendary 5th king of Rome
- Lucius Valerius Messalla Thrasea Priscus (died c. 212), Roman senator
- Lucius Venuleius Apronianus Octavius Priscus (fl. 142–168), Roman senator, suffect consul, consul and legion commander
- Marcus Statius Priscus, 2nd-century Roman senator, governor and general
- Marius Priscus, proconsul of Africa in 100
- Quintus Pompeius Senecio Sosius Priscus, 2nd-century Roman senator and consul
- Tarquitius Priscus, Roman writer
- Titus Julius Priscus (died c. 251), Roman governor and usurper

== Other uses ==
- 13653 Priscus, an asteroid
