= Genesius of Lyon =

Saint Genesius of Lyon (Genestus, Genes; died 679) was the 37th Archbishop of Lyon.

== Life ==
He was a native of France and became a religious and prior of Fontenelle Abbey). Attached to the court and camp of Clovis II, he acted as chief almoner to the queen, Bathildis. When Bathilde was regent for her six-year-old son Chlothar III after the death of her husband in 657, she commissioned Genesius to expand Chelles monastery.

He succeeded the murdered Annemund in the See of Lyon, and was consecrated in 657 or 658. His name is found for the first time as bishop in a signature of 6 September 664, attached to a charter drawn up by Bertefred, bishop of Amiens, for the Abbey of Corbie.

On 26 June 667, he subscribed another charter framed by Drauscius, Bishop of Soissons, for a convent of the Blessed Virgin founded by Ebroin, mayor of the palace, and his wife Leutrude. In the conflict between Ebroin and St. Leger (Leodegarius), Bishop of Autun, Genesius (675-76) took the part of the bishop and was in consequence attacked by an armed band sent by Ebroin to expel him from Lyons; but Genesius collected a force and successfully defended his city.

In September, 677, he assisted at an assembly held at Maslay-le-Roi or more probably Marly-le-Roi. He was succeeded at Lyon by Landebertus otherwise Lambertus. His body remained in the Saint-Nizier Church till the beginning of the fourteenth century, when it was transferred to Chelles Abbey.

He is a Catholic saint, feast day 1 November.

Catholic Church titles
Preceded by Annemund	Archbishop of Lyon; 660 – c. 679	Succeeded by Lambertus
