= Peter of Savoy =

Peter of Savoy may refer to:

- Peter I of Savoy (died 1078), who ruled jointly with his brother Amedeo from 1060 to 1078
- Peter II of Savoy (1203–1268), Count of Savoy
- Peter of Aigueblanche (died 1268), medieval bishop of Hereford
- Peter of Savoy (archbishop of Lyon) (died 1332)
