= Raymond Saquet =

French prelate

Raymond Saquet (d. 1358 ) was a French prelate of the 14th century, Papal LegatePapal Legate and Bishop.

Raymond was an advisor to the Parlement of Paris and bishop of Thérouanne from 1334. Papal Legate, being sent to negotiate with the Byzantine Government to coordinate the ongoing Crusade against the Ottomans. During this time he was at the siege of Smyrna.

In 1355 he was elected Archbishop of Lyon and confirmed the privileges of citizens, by his predecessor, by order of 24 April 1357.
