= Regula Monachorum =

Regula Monachorum is a Latin phrase meaning 'Rule for Monks'. It may refer to:

- Rule for Monks by Aurelianus of Arles
- Rule for Monks by Audoen of Rouen (St Ouen)
- Rule of Saint Benedict
- Rule for Monks by Caesarius of Arles
- Rule of Saint Columbanus
- Rule for Monks by Isidore of Seville
