= Abbaye de la Déserte =

Monastery in Rhône, France

Coordinates: 45.771°N 4.829°E

The Abbaye de la Déserte or Abbaye Notre-Dame de la Déserte ("Our Lady of the Wasteland") was a nunnery in Lyon, France. Founded in 1303 by Louis de Villars, Archbishop of Lyon, and Blanche de Chalon (Lady of Belleville), who was also the first abbess, it housed the Poor Clares from 1304 till 1503, and then Benedictine nuns from 1503 to the French Revolution, when it was dissolved. It was demolished in 1814.

== History ==
The abbey was founded in the parish of La Platière in an area that was then a wasteland on the southern slopes of the Croix-Rousse. Originally a house of the Poor Clares, it adopted the Rule of St. Benedict in 1503. The abbess was appointed by the King but proofs of nobility were not mandatory for the appointment of the nuns.

In the early 17th century adherence to the Benedictine rule grew lax and Abbess Marguerite de Guibly (the first of the name) applied severe reform in 1620 before instituting the Benedictine rule in the Priory of Our Lady of Bourbon in Auzon with five nuns from La Déserte.

== Abbesses ==
- Blanche de Chalon, founder
- Dame Jeanne Dupuy, 1304
- Mathive de Durchia, 1310
- Aignette de Dreux...
- Jeanne de Durchia...
- Jacquette de Latra...
- Jeanne Humili, 1315
- Jacquette de Lacre, 1331
- Catherine de Vassalieu, 1351
- Tichette de Varey, 1359
- Isabeau d'Huys, 1371
- Isabelle de Joffrey, 1382
- Étiennette de Chalentin, 1406
- Amphélise Burle, 1406
- Bernarde Barrai, 1413
- Beatrice Thimote, 1425
- Catherine Carronnier, 1436
- Antoinette de Turnaire, 1480
- Antoinette de Lupercieu, 1481
- Marguerite de Varey, 1484
- Catherine Garin, 1493
- Catherine de Vaillieu, 1501
- Pernette de la Poype, 1507
- Jeanne de Grammont, 1513
- Catherine de Grammont, 1514
- Antoinette de Saint Amour, 1521
- Claudine de Clérat, 1545
- Louise Dumas, 1566
- Laurence Bernard, 1585
- Guyonne de Chaponay, 1589
- Marguerite de Guibly I, 1618
- Marguerite de Guibly II, 1675
- Antoinette de Châtillon, 1732
- Marie de Foudras, 1715
- Claudine Constance de Moyria de Châtillon, 1732
- Jeanne-Marie-Alexandrine de Montjouvent, 1758
