= Aurelianus of Arles =

Archbishop of Arles

Aurelianus (523 – 551) was Archbishop of Arles from 546 to 551. His predecessors were Auxanius (bishop form 542–546) and Caesarius of Arles (d. 542). His father Sacerdos (d. 552) was an Archbishop of Lyon. His cousin Nicetius (d. 573) succeeded his father as Archbishop of Lyon. He died on 16 June 551 in Lyon and is buried in the Church of Saint-Nizier. The text of his epitaph is preserved.

== Life ==
Aurelianus was the son of Sacerdos of Lyon. He was elected to the See of Aries in 546. Like his predecessor Auxanius, Aurelianus wrote the pope requesting the granting of the pallium as a mark of the dignity and powers of a papal legate for Gaul; Pope Vigilius granted this request.

Aurelianus founded two monasteries in Arles, a community for monks dedicated to Saint Peter in collaboration with King Childebert I and his wife Ultrogotha, and a convent dedicated to Saint Mary. Saint-Peter may count among the first monasteries (co-)founded by a Merovingian king.

He wrote a Rule for Monks for his first foundation, which is primarily based on Caesarius of Arles' Rule for Monks but also uses parts of Caesarius' Rule for Virgins. It is the only early medieval monastic rule for monks that requires total enclosure.

Later Aurelianus produced a female version of his Rule for his second foundation. His Rule for Nuns is somewhat shorter but shows few signs of an adjustment for the other gender, which indicates that in his view there were no fundamental differences between monks and nuns with regard to their status and monastic practice.

Both rules are preserved in Benedict of Aniane's Codex Regularum. A number of chapters of his Rule for Monks appear also in Benedict of Aniane's Concordia Regularum.

In 549 he participated in the Fifth Council of Orléans, which was presided by his father.

Aurelianus is venerated as an Eastern Orthodox and Roman Catholic saint. His feast day is 16 June.

== Sources ==
Rule for Monks:

- Schmidt, Albert, ‘Zur Komposition der Mönchsregel des heiligen Aurelian von Arles’, in: Studia Monastica 17 (1975), pp. 237–256.
- Hostenius, Lucas, Codex Regularum, Paris 1663, pp. 58-69.
- Patrologia Latina, vol. 68, col. 385-395.

Rule for Nuns:

- Patrologia Latina, vol. 68, col. 399-406.
- Mayo, Hope, Three Merowingian Rules for Nuns, PhD thesis Harvard, Cambridge Mass. 1974, vol. 2, pp. 4-68.

There is currently no English translation of Aurelianus' rules available.

Letters of Pope Vigilius to Aurelianus of Arles

- MGH Epistolae, vol. 3, Berlin: Weidmann 1982, pp. 64-68.

Epitaph:

- Duchesne, Louis, Fastes Épiscopaux de L’Ancienne Gaule, 1, Paris 1907, pp. 258-259.

== Literature ==
- Diem, Albrecht, ‘ ...ut si professus fuerit se omnia impleturum, tunc excipiatur. Observations on the Rules for Monks and Nuns of Caesarius and Aurelianus of Arles’, in: Victoria Zimmerl-Panagl, Lukas J. Dorfbauer and Clemens Weidmann (eds.), Edition und Erforschung lateinischer patristischer Texte. 150 Jahre CSEL. Festschrift für Kurt Smolak zum 70. Geburtstag, Berlin/Boston: De Gruyter 2014, pp. 191–224. ISBN 978-3110336863.
- Heinzelmann, Martin, Bischofsherrschaft in Gallien. Zur Kontinuität römischer Führungsschichten vom 4. bis 7. Jahrhundert. Soziale, prosopographische und bildungsgeschichtliche Aspekte, Zurich/Munich 1976 (Beihefete der Francia, vol. 5), pp. 138–152. ISBN 978-3760846552.
- Klingshirn, William E., Caesarius of Arles. The Making of a Christian Community in Late Antique Gaul, Cambridge etc.: Cambridge University Press 1994, pp. 262–264. ISBN 978-0521528528.
- Schmidt, Albert, ‘Zur Komposition der Mönchsregel des heiligen Aurelian von Arles’, in: Studia Monastica 17 (1975), pp. 237–256 and 18 (1976), pp. 17–54.
- Ueding, Leo, Geschichte der Klostergründungen der frühen Merowingerzeit, Berlin 1935, pp. 75–79.
