= Gebuin =

Gebuin, Gebwin or Gibuin (French: Gébuin, Gébouin; Latin: Gebuinus, Gibuinus) is a masculine given name of Germanic origin. It may refer to:

- Gebuin I (died 991), bishop of Châlons
- Gebuin II (died 1004), bishop of Châlons
- Gebuin (died 1082), archbishop of Lyon
- Gebuin of Troyes (fl. 1140–1161), archdeacon of Troyes
- Gebwin of Thierheim, abbot of St Ulrich's and St Afra's (1241–1266)

== Sources ==
- Berend Wispelwey, ed., Biographical Index of the Middle Ages. K. G. Saur, 2008.
- S. L. Uckelman, "Gebwin", in S. L. Uckelman, ed., The Dictionary of Medieval Names from European Sources, Edition 2023, no. 1.
