= Jean de Talaru =

Archbishop of Lyon

John de Talaru (died 1393) was a cardinal and archbishop of Lyon.

== Biography ==
Born near Lyon he came from the influential Talaru family and was the uncle of Archbishop Amédée de Talaru. His career began when he was made canon of the Basilica of Saint Justus in Lyon, then canon and custos of St. John's Cathedral. He managed to climb to the deanery of this institution, before being elected bishop on 29 July 1375.

In 1376, he held a local synod and 1378 he toured his diocese taking stock of the holding of all the places of worship, and priests. This tour covers nearly 400 buildings. He is remembered in his diocese as bringing "a spirit of peace, a desire to bring the pastoral spirit and great libéralité"

He was made cardinal in 1389 by the anti-pope Clement VII at the request of King Charles VI of France, but he was never ordained. Later the same year, he gave up his seat to Philip Thurey. He died in 1393.

== See also ==
- Catholic Church in France

Catholic Church titles
| Preceded by Charles d'Alençon | Bishop of Lyon; 1375–1389 | Succeeded by Philippe III de Thurey |
