= Sacerdos of Lyon =

Catholic saint and Archbishop of Lyon (d. 552)

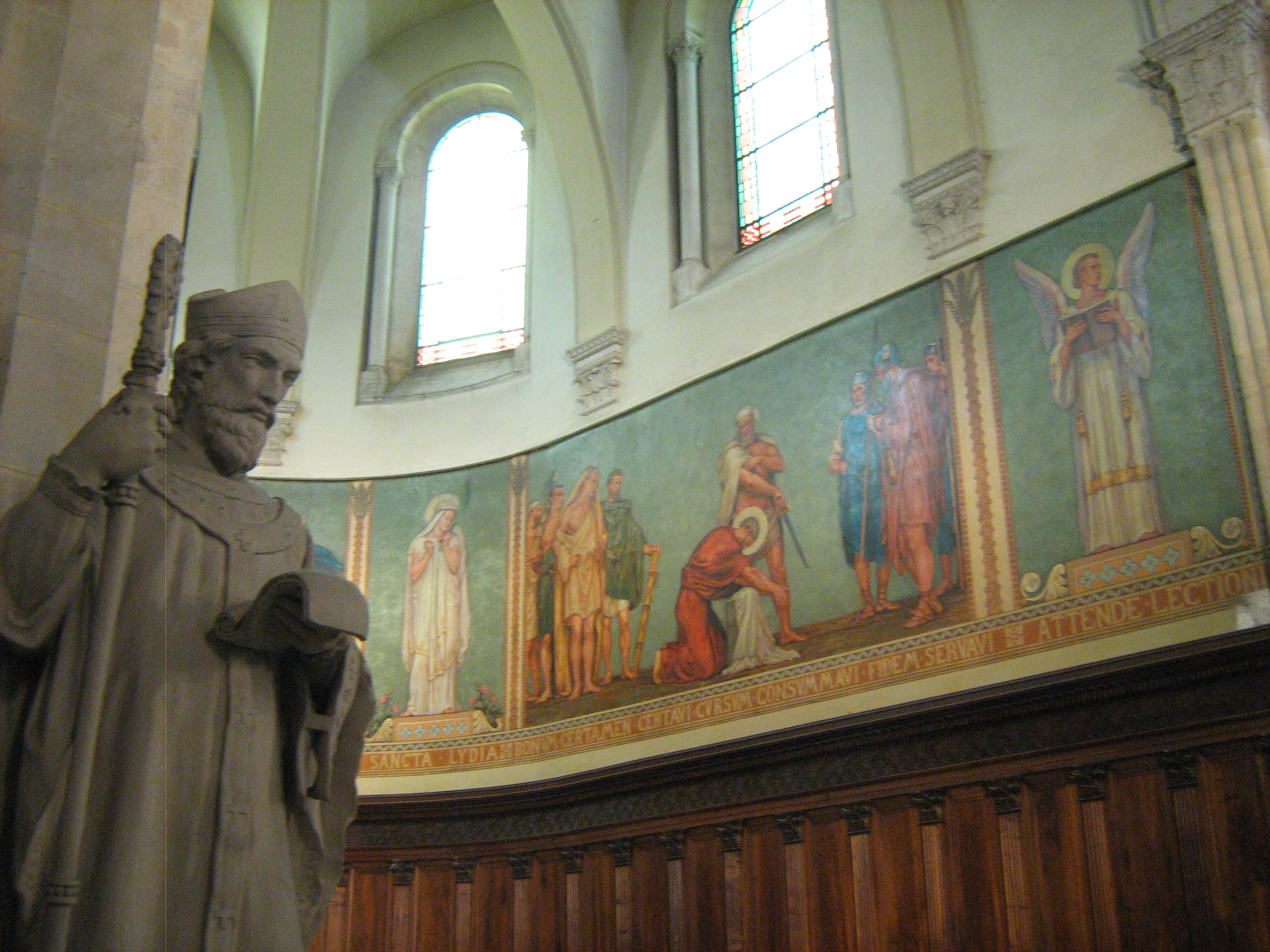
Sacerdos of Lyon in St Paul's Church, Lyon.

Saint Sacerdos (Sardot or Serdot) of Lyon (487 – 552) was Archbishop of Lyon from 544 to 552. He is venerated as a saint in the Catholic Church whose feast day is 12 September.

== Life ==
Sacerdos was the son of St. Rusticus, Archbishop of Lyon, and his wife.

Sacerdos was a distinguished Bishop of Lyon who He presided at the Fifth Council of Orléans in 549 He is thought to have built the Église Saint-Paul, and the Church of Saint-Eulalia, which later became the Église Saint-Georges.

His son Saint Aurelianus was an Archbishop of Arles. His nephew Nicetius of Lyon (Nizier) succeeded him as Archbishop of Lyon.

He died at Paris, King Childebert, whose adviser he had been, assisting at his deathbed. His remains were transported to Lyons, where he was buried in the church of the Apostles, later known as the Church of Saint Nicholas.

Catholic Church titles
Preceded by Licontius	Archbishop of Lyon; 544–551	Succeeded by Nicetius
