= Maximus of Lyon =

French Catholic bishop

Maxime of Lyon (Latin: Maximus) was the 10th bishop of Lyon. He succeeds Vocius in the first half of the 4th century.

Very little is known of his life. His name is known to us from the various lists of the first archbishops of Lyon and chronicles the history of the Church of Lyon. It is sometimes likened to a Maximus mentioned in the Litany of the Church of Lyon but without no basis to this attachment.

Catholic Church titles
Preceded by Vocius	Bishop of Lyon; 4th century	Succeeded by Tétradius
