= Leontius (archbishop of Lyon) =

First Century Archbishop in France

Leontius, Archbishop of Lyon was a son of St. Rusticus, with St. Rusticus also being Archbishop of Lyon preceding Leontius.

In turn, Leontius acted as Archbishop in the 540s (AD).
