= Louis de Villars =

French prelate (1268-1308)

Arms of the de Villars family

Louis de Villars (1268 – 12 or 13 July 1308) was a French prelate of the early 14th century. He was Archbishop of Lyon and Primate of Gaul and was the son of Humbert IV, sire of Thoire and Villars, and an unknown mother, possibly Beatrice of Burgundy. He succeeded his great-uncle Henry I of Villars as Archbishop of Lyon in 1301, and was himself succeeded by his nephew Henri II de Villars.

== Early bishopric ==
In 1303 he established the Carmelites in Lyon and in 1304 he authorized the founding of the Abbaye de la Déserte. He erected the church of Saint-Nizier in Lyon and obtained confirmation from Philip the Fair of the countship of Lyon to the archbishops and the cathedral chapter.

He was the subject of the papal bull Ausculta Fili by Boniface VIII ( an ally), addressed to Philip the Fair.

== Later bishopric ==
The church of Lyon had the right to recognize a vassal of the Emperor for the countship of Lyon. Pope Clement V intervened to bring the King of France and the archbishop of Lyon to a treaty, in 1307.

Philip the Fair issued two edicts known as the Philippines, the second of which left a grievance between the cathedral chapter and the archbishop. This hostility lasted until the time of Peter of Savoy.
