= Henri de Villars (died 1693) =

French prelate

for Henri de Villars, Archbishop of Lyon, see Henri de Villars (died 1354)

Henri de Villars (c. 1621–27 December 1693) was a French prelate, latterly Archbishop of Vienne from 1662 to his death.

== Life ==
Henri was born in Rome, the son of Claude de Villars, Baron de Maclas, and his wife Charlotte de Calvisson. His brother was the writer and diplomat Pierre de Villars. His uncle was Pierre de Villars, Archbishop of Vienne.

He was a canon and capiscopal in Vienne Cathedral. In 1650 he attended the general assembly of the clergy of the ecclesiastical province of Vienne. In 1651 he was appointed general agent of the clergy of France following the death of Théophile du Chemin de Lauraet. On 30 August 1655 he was appointed titular bishop of Philippopolis of Arabia and coadjutor with his uncle Pierre de Villars, Archbishop of Vienne, whom he succeeded as archbishop on 25 May 1662.

He established a seminary in Vienne, which he entrusted to the priests of the Oratory of Jesus, and undertook to reform the breviary of the diocese.
