= Gondulf of Provence =

French bishop

Duke Gondulf (Latin: Gondulphus, Gondulfus, Gundulfus), was also known as Gundulf. He is thought to have been a patrician of Provence who later became Bishop of Metz in the year 591. There is some evidence that he was only a chorbishop. He was the son of the Senator Florentinus (born 485) and Artemia, the daughter of St. Rusticus.

== Sources ==
- Christian Settipani, Les ancêtres de Charlemagne, 1989.
- Gregory of Tours, The History of the Franks.
