= Ptolémaeus of Lyon =

French Catholic bishop

Ptolemy, also known as Ptolémée, Ptolomeus or Ptolemaeus, was the 8th Bishop of Lyon. He succeeded Julius in the second half of the 3rd century.

Little is known about his life. His name is known from the various lists of the first archbishops of Lyon and chronicles the history of the Church of Lyon. He is quoted in a catalog of the Abbey of Île Barbe. He is also the last bishop of Lyon to have a Greek name; the early Christian community of Lyon originally had strong links with Asia Minor which gradually disappeared with the development of Christianity in Gaul.

Catholic Church titles
Preceded by Julius	Bishop of Lyon; 3rd century	Succeeded by Vocius
