= Jacques-Marie-Achille Ginoulhiac =

French bishop

His Eminence Jacques-Marie-Achille Ginoulhiac
- Archbishop of Lyon
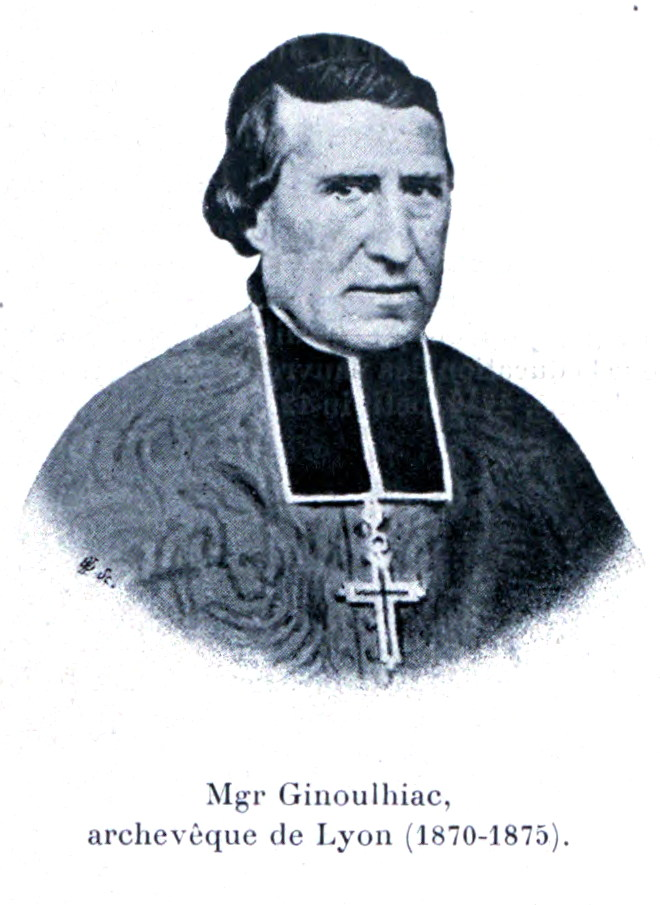
- Church: Roman Catholic Church
- Archdiocese: Lyon
- See: Lyon
- Appointed: 27 June 1870
- Term ended: 17 November 1875
- Predecessor: Louis-Jacques-Maurice de Bonald
- Successor: Louis-Marie-Joseph-Eusèbe Caverot
- Previous post: Bishop of Grenoble (1853-70)

Orders
- Ordination: 27 March 1830
- Consecration: 1 May 1853 by Pierre-Marie-Joseph Darcimoles

Personal details
- Born: Jacques-Marie-Achille Ginoulhiac; 3 December 1806 Montpellier, First French Empire
- Died: 17 November 1875 (aged 68) Montpellier, French Third Republic
- Buried: Lyon Cathedral
- Parents: Pierre Ginoulhiac; Pierrette Élisabeth Nourrit
- Motto: Dei sapientia
- Coat of arms

Jacques-Marie-Achille Ginoulhiac (born at Montpellier, department of Hérault, 3 December 1806; died there 17 November 1875) was a French bishop.

== Biography ==
Immediately after his ordination to the priesthood (1830) he was appointed professor in the seminary at Montpellier and later (1839) vicar-general at Aix. Consecrated Bishop of Grenoble in 1853, he was appointed the following year assistant to the pontifical throne, and knight of the Legion of Honour.

At the Council of the Vatican, Ginoulhiac spoke publicly on philosophical errors (30 December 1869), on the rule of faith (22 March and 1 April 1870), and on the pope's infallibility (23 May and 28 June 1870). On this latter point he sided with the minority and left Rome before the session of 18 July, in which the doctrine was defined.

In 1870 he was transferred from Grenoble to the archiepiscopal See of Lyon. Fearing the Prussian invasion, the inhabitants of Lyon vowed to erect a basilica at Fourvières if the city were spared. The written pledge, signed by thousands of inhabitants, was placed on the altar of the Blessed Virgin by the archbishop himself. In 1873, in fulfillment of this promise, he laid the cornerstone of the edifice which stands on the hill of Fourvières.

== Works ==
While at Grenoble, Bishop Ginoulhiac wrote and published several letters and pastorals, especially on the condition of the Pontifical States (1860), on Ernest Renan's Life of Jesus (1863) and on the accusations of the press against the Encyclical of 8 December 1864 and the Syllabus (1865).

His works are:

- Histoire du dogme catholique pendant les trois premiers siècles de l' Eglise et jusqu'au concile de Nicée (Paris, 1852, 1865)
- Les épîtres pastorales, ou reflexions dogmatiques et morales sur les epitres de Saint Paul à Timothée et à Tite (Paris, 1866)
- Le concile oecuménique (Paris, 1869)
- Le sermon sur la montagne (Lyons, 1872)
- Les origines du christianisme, a posthumous work published by Canon Servonnet (Paris, 1878)

== See also ==
- Our Lady of La Salette
