= Bédien Morange =

French theologian

Bédien Morange (born in Paris and died in 1703 in Lyon), was a French theologian.

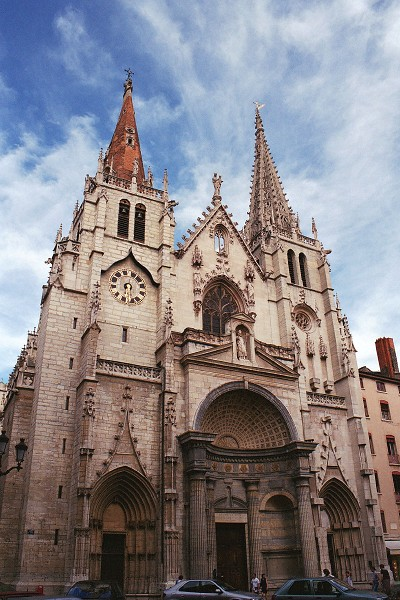
Bédien Morange was canon and cantor of the église Saint-Nizier (Lyon).

He was a doctor of Sorbonne. In 1660, he became canon and cantor of the Église Saint-Nizier (Lyon) and then was general vicar of the diocese. He devoted himself especially to refute the theory of Isaac de la Peyrère, who held that the Old Testament proves that there were men before Adam, and he wrote a catechism for his diocese, Summa universœ Theologiae Catéchistae. He was a member of the Compagnie du Saint-Sacrement.

The epistle Instructions pour les confesseurs by Jesuit Gaspard Loarte was dedicated to him.

== Works ==
- Libri de preadamitis brevis Analysis, Lyon, Ant. Jullieron and Ant. Baret, 1656, in-16°.
- Primatus Lugdunensis Apologeticon, Lyon, Ant. Jullieron and Ant. Baret 1658, in 8°.
- Summa universœ Theologiae Catéchistae, Lyon, 1670, 4 vol. in-8°.
