= Vocius of Lyon =

Vocius of Lyon was the ninth bishop of Lyon and succeeded Ptolemy probably around 300.

We do not know much about his life however, in 314, he participated as bishop of Lyon in the Council of Arles, just after Constantine recognized Christianity with the Edict of Milan. This council brought together twenty bishops of Western Europe including fifteen from Gaul and declared condemnation of Donatism, already affirmed by a council in Rome in 313. He signed the Acts of the councils and the synodal letter of the Council to Pope Sylvester I to confirm the canons of the council. It is accompanied by another cleric of Lyon, Gétulin (or Petulinus), exorcist of Lyons, who also signs the acts of conciles.

Catholic Church titles
| Preceded by Ptolémaeus | Bishop of Lyon; 4th century | Succeeded by Maximus |
