= Auxanius =

Auxanius was Bishop of Arles c. 543-c. 546. He was succeeded by Bishop Aurelian of Arles. Auxanius received two letters from Pope Vigilius. He is otherwise unknown.
