= Verus of Lyon =

French Catholic bishop

Verus of Lyon (French: Vère de Lyon) was the sixth bishop of Lyon. He succeeded Saint Faustin in the second half of the 3rd century.

Verus' name is known to us from the various lists of the first archbishops of Lyon and chronicles the history of the Church of Lyon. After the first six remarkable and canonized Bishops, Verus was the first bishop of a dark period for the Lyon religious history that extends to the episcopate of St. Just a century later.

His name means Glass.

Catholic Church titles
Preceded by Faustinus	Bishop of Lyon; 3rd century	Succeeded by Julius
