= Louis Jacques Maurice de Bonald =

French Catholic cardinal (1787–1870)

His Eminence Louis Jacques Maurice de Bonald
- Cardinal Archbishop of Lyon
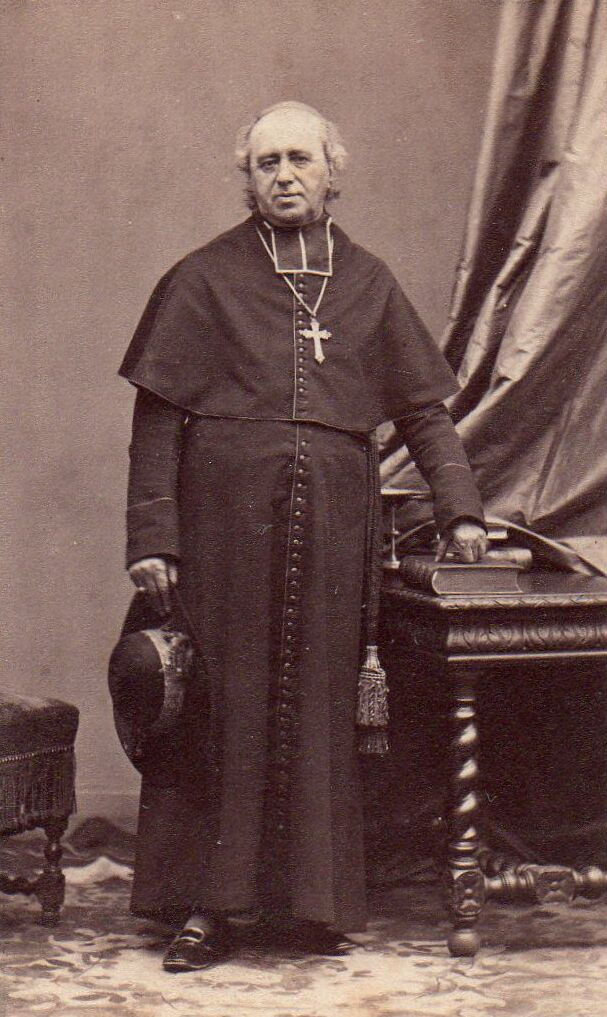
- Photograph of Cardinal Bonald
- Church: Catholic Church
- Archdiocese: Lyon
- Appointed: 4 December 1839
- In office: 1839-1870
- Predecessor: Joachim-Jean-Xavier d'Isoard
- Successor: Jacques-Marie-Achille Ginoulhiac
- Other post: Cardinal-Priest of Santissima Trinità al Monte Pincio
- Previous post: Bishop of Le Puy-en-Velay (1823-1839)

Orders
- Ordination: 22 February 1812
- Consecration: 27 April 1823 by Jean-Baptiste de Latil
- Created cardinal: 1 March 1841 by Gregory XVI
- Rank: Cardinal-Priest

Personal details
- Born: October 30, 1787 Millau, Kingdom of France
- Died: February 23, 1870 (aged 82) Lyon, France
- Coat of arms

Styles of Louis de Bonald
- Reference style: His Eminence
- Spoken style: Your Eminence
- Informal style: Cardinal
- See: Lyon

Louis Jacques Maurice de Bonald (30 October 1787 – 23 February 1870) was a French cardinal and Archbishop of Lyon.

== Biography ==
Born at Millau, he was the son of the philosopher Louis Gabriel Ambroise de Bonald.

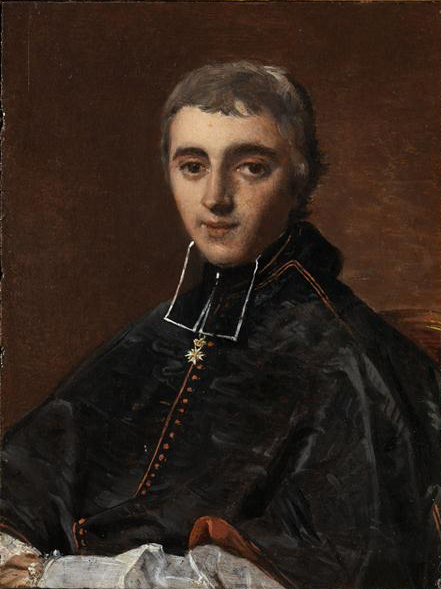
Portrait of a younger Louis Jacques Maurice de Bonald by Jean Auguste Dominique Ingres (1816).

In 1845 the Conseil d'État declared Bonald guilty of abuse for a pastoral letter he wrote condemning the book Manuel de droit ecclésiastique written by André Marie Jean Jacques Dupin. In 1848 he held a memorial service for those who fell gloriously in defence of civil and religious liberty. In 1851 he nevertheless advocated in the Senate the maintenance of the temporal power of the Pope by force of arms.

== See also ==
- Catholic Church in France
- Our Lady of La Salette
