= Lupicinus of Lyon =

French saint and archbishop

Lupicinus of Lyon was the first Archbishop of Lyon (491–494) Bishop of Lyon. His feast day is 3 February.

Catholic Church titles
Preceded by Patiens	Bishop of Lyon; 491–494	Succeeded by Rusticus
