= Julius of Lyon =

French Catholic bishop

Julius of Lyon (French: Jules de Lyon) was the seventh bishop of Lyon. He succeeded Verus in the second half of the 3rd century.

We know very little about him and his life, except that it establishes Philetus as second Abbot of the Abbey of Île Barbe. His name is known to us from the various lists of the first bishops of Lyon and chronicles the history of the Church of Lyon. His episcopate is one of the dark periods of the religious history of Lyon after the first well most famous bishops.

Catholic Church titles
Preceded by Verus	Bishop of Lyon; 3rd century	Succeeded by Ptolémaeus
