= Tétradius of Lyon =

French Catholic bishop

Tétrade of Lyon (Latin: Tetradius or Tetrardus) was the 11th bishop of Lyon. He replaced Maxime in the first half of the 4th century.

Like his predecessor Maximus, he is known from the various lists of the first archbishops of Lyon and chronicles the history of the Church of Lyon. He is sometimes confused with Tetrad, bishop of Bourges who lived two centuries later.

Catholic Church titles
Preceded by Maximus	Bishop of Lyon; 4th century	Succeeded by Verissimus
