= Augustine of Canterbury =

Missionary, archbishop, and saint (died 604)

Saint Augustine of Canterbury OSB
- Archbishop of Canterbury
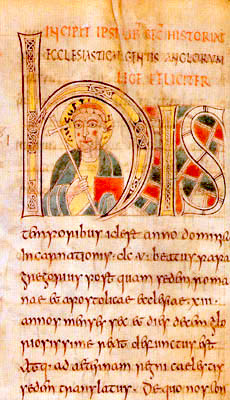
- Portrait labelled "AUGUSTINUS" from the mid-8th-century Saint Petersburg Bede, though perhaps intended as Gregory the Great. (Note: The name is in the halo, in a later hand. The figure is identified as a saint, rather than Christ, by his clerical tonsure. The view that it represents Gregory is set out by Douglas Michaels in a recent article.)
- Church: Latin Church
- Diocese: Canterbury
- See: Canterbury
- Appointed: Before 601
- Term ended: Probably 26 May 604
- Predecessor: None
- Successor: Laurence of Canterbury
- Other post: Prior of Abbey of St Andrew's

Orders
- Consecration: c. 597

Personal details
- Born: Early 6th century, probably in Italy
- Died: Probably 26 May 604 Canterbury, Kingdom of Kent
- Buried: St Augustine's Abbey, Canterbury

Sainthood
- Feast day: 26 May (Anglican, Eastern Orthodox, and Catholic Extraordinary Form calendar in Great Britain); 27 May (Catholic Ordinary Form calendar); 28 May (Catholic Extraordinary Form calendar outside Great Britain)
- Venerated in: Anglican Communion; Catholic Church; Eastern Orthodox Church
- Canonized: Pre-congregation
- Shrines: St Augustine's Abbey, Canterbury (destroyed); St Augustine's, Ramsgate

Augustine of Canterbury (early 6th century – c. 26 May 604, or 605) was a Christian monk who became the first Archbishop of Canterbury in the year 597. He was the prior of a Benedictine monastery in Rome when Pope Gregory I chose him in 595 to lead a mission, usually known as the Gregorian mission, to Britain to Christianize King Æthelberht and his Kingdom of Kent from Anglo-Saxon paganism.

Kent was likely chosen because Æthelberht commanded major influence over neighbouring Anglo-Saxon kingdoms in addition to his marriage to Bertha, a Frankish princess and Christian, who was expected to exert some influence over her husband. Before reaching Kent, the missionaries had considered turning back, but Gregory urged them on, and in 597 Augustine landed on the Isle of Thanet and proceeded to Æthelberht's main town, Canterbury.

King Æthelberht converted to Christianity and allowed the missionaries to preach freely, giving them land to found a monastery outside the city walls. Augustine was consecrated as a bishop and converted many of the king's subjects, including thousands during a mass baptism on Christmas Day in 597. Pope Gregory sent more missionaries in 601, along with encouraging letters and gifts for the churches, although attempts to persuade the native British bishops to submit to Augustine's authority failed. Roman bishops were established at London, and Rochester in 604, and a school was founded to train Anglo-Saxon priests and missionaries. Augustine also arranged the consecration of his successor, Laurence of Canterbury. The archbishop probably died in 604 and was soon revered as a saint.

== Background to the mission ==
After the withdrawal of the largely Christianized Roman legions from their province of Britannia in 410, the inhabitants were left to defend themselves against the attacks and settlements of the Pagan-Germanic Angles, Saxons, and Jutes. Before the Roman withdrawal, Britannia had been converted to Christianity. Britain sent three Christian bishops to the Council of Arles in 314, and a Gaulish bishop went to the island in 396 to help settle Church disciplinary matters. Material remains testify to a growing presence of Christians, at least until around 360. After the Roman legions departed, pagan tribes settled the southern parts of the island while western Britain, beyond the Anglo-Saxon kingdoms, remained Christian. This native British Church developed in isolation from Rome under the influence of missionaries from Ireland and was centred on monasteries instead of bishoprics. Other distinguishing characteristics were its calculation of the date of Easter and the style of the tonsure haircut worn by clerics. (Note: Yorke discusses the issue of the "Celtic Church" and what exactly it was in her work The Conversion of Britain.) Evidence for the survival of Christianity in the eastern part of Britain during this time includes the survival of the cult of Saint Alban and the occurrence in place names of eccles, derived from the Latin ecclesia, meaning "church". There is no evidence that these native Christians tried to convert the Anglo-Saxons. The invasions destroyed most remnants of Roman civilisation in the areas held by the Saxons and related tribes, including the economic and religious structures.

It was against this background that Pope Gregory I decided to send a mission, often called the Gregorian mission, to convert the Anglo-Saxons to Christianity in 595. The Kingdom of Kent was ruled by Æthelberht, who had married a Christian princess named Bertha before 588, and perhaps earlier than 560. Bertha was the daughter of Charibert I, one of the Merovingian kings of the Franks. As one of the conditions of her marriage, she brought a bishop named Liudhard with her to Kent. Together in Canterbury, they restored a church that dated to Roman times – possibly the current St Martin's Church. Æthelberht was a pagan at this point, but allowed his wife freedom of worship. One biographer of Bertha states that under his wife's influence, Æthelberht asked Pope Gregory to send missionaries. The historian Ian N. Wood feels that the initiative came from the Kentish court as well as the queen. Other historians, however, believe that Gregory initiated the mission, although the exact reasons remain unclear. Bede, an 8th-century monk who wrote a history of the English church, recorded a famous story in which Gregory saw fair-haired Saxon slaves from Britain in the Roman slave market and was inspired to try to convert their people. (Note: Supposedly, Gregory inquired about who the slaves were. He was told they were Angles from the island of Great Britain. Gregory replied that they were not Angles, but Angels.) More practical matters, such as the acquisition of new provinces acknowledging the primacy of the papacy, and a desire to influence the emerging power of the Kentish kingdom under Æthelberht, were probably involved. The mission may have been an outgrowth of the missionary efforts against the Lombards who, as pagans and Arian Christians, were not on good relations with the Catholic church in Rome.

Aside from Æthelberht's granting of freedom of worship to his wife, the choice of Kent was probably dictated by a number of other factors. Kent was the dominant power in southeastern Britain. Since the eclipse of King Ceawlin of Wessex in 592, Æthelberht was the bretwalda, or leading Anglo-Saxon ruler; Bede refers to Æthelberht as having imperium (overlordship) south of the River Humber. Trade between the Franks and Æthelberht's kingdom was well established, and the language barrier between the two regions was apparently only a minor obstacle, as the interpreters for the mission came from the Franks. Lastly, Kent's proximity to the Franks allowed support from a Christian area. There is some evidence, including Gregory's letters to Frankish kings in support of the mission, that some of the Franks felt that they had a claim to overlordship over some of the southern British kingdoms at this time. The presence of a Frankish bishop could also have lent credence to claims of overlordship, if Bertha's Bishop Liudhard was felt to be acting as a representative of the Frankish church and not merely as a spiritual advisor to the queen. Frankish influence was not merely political; archaeological remains attest to a cultural influence as well.

In 595, Gregory chose Augustine, who was the prior of the Benedictine Abbey of St Andrew in Rome, to head the mission to Kent. The pope selected monks to accompany Augustine and sought support from the Frankish royalty and clergy in a series of letters, of which some copies survive in Rome. He wrote to King Theuderic II of Burgundy and to King Theudebert II of Austrasia, as well as their grandmother Brunhild, seeking aid for the mission. Gregory thanked King Chlothar II of Neustria for aiding Augustine. Besides hospitality, the Frankish bishops and kings provided interpreters and Frankish priests to accompany the mission. By soliciting help from the Frankish kings and bishops, Gregory helped to assure a friendly reception for Augustine in Kent, as Æthelbert was unlikely to mistreat a mission which visibly had the support of his wife's relatives and people. Moreover, the Franks appreciated the chance to participate in a mission that would extend their influence in Kent. Chlothar, in particular, needed a friendly realm across the Channel to help guard his kingdom's flanks against his fellow Frankish kings.

Sources make no mention of why Pope Gregory chose a monk to head the mission. Pope Gregory once wrote to Æthelberht, complimenting Augustine's knowledge of the Bible, so Augustine was evidently well educated. Other qualifications included administrative ability, for Gregory was the abbot of St Andrews as well as being pope, which left the day-to-day running of the abbey to Augustine, the prior.

== Arrival and first efforts ==
Map of the general outlines of some of the British kingdoms in about 600

Augustine was accompanied by Laurence of Canterbury, his eventual successor to the archbishopric, and a group of about 40 companions, some of whom were monks. Soon after leaving Rome, the missionaries halted, daunted by the nature of the task before them. They sent Augustine back to Rome to request papal permission to return. Gregory refused and sent Augustine back with letters encouraging the missionaries to persevere. In 597, Augustine and his companions landed in Kent. They achieved some initial success soon after their arrival: Æthelberht permitted the missionaries to settle and preach in his capital of Canterbury where they used the church of St Martin's for services. Neither Bede nor Gregory mentions the date of Æthelberht's conversion, but it probably took place in 597. (Note: However, Bede's chronology may be a bit off, as he gives the king's death as occurring in February 616, and says the king died 21 years after his conversion, which would date the conversion to 595. This would be before Augustine's mission, and directly contradicts Bede's statement that the king's conversion was due to Augustine's mission. However, as Gregory in his letter of 601 to the king and queen strongly implies that the queen was unable to effect the conversion of her husband, the problem of the dating is likely a chronological error on Bede's part.) In the early medieval period, large-scale conversions required the ruler's conversion first, and Augustine is recorded as making large numbers of converts within a year of his arrival in Kent. Also, by 601, Gregory was writing to both Æthelberht and Bertha, calling the king his son and referring to his baptism. (Note: The letter, as translated in Brooks' Early History of the Church of Canterbury, p. 8, says "preserve the grace he had received". Grace in this context meant the grace of baptism.) A late medieval tradition, recorded by the 15th-century chronicler Thomas Elmham, gives the date of the king's conversion as Whit Sunday, or 2 June 597; there is no reason to doubt this date, although there is no other evidence for it. Against a date in 597 is a letter of Gregory's to Patriarch Eulogius of Alexandria in June 598, which mentions the number of converts made by Augustine, but does not mention any baptism of the king. However, it is clear that by 601 the king had been converted. His baptism likely took place at Canterbury.

Augustine established his episcopal see at Canterbury. It is not clear when and where Augustine was consecrated as a bishop. Bede, writing about a century later, states that Augustine was consecrated by the Frankish Archbishop Ætherius of Arles, Gaul (France), after the conversion of Æthelberht. Contemporary letters from Pope Gregory, however, refer to Augustine as a bishop before he arrived in England. A letter of Gregory's from September 597 calls Augustine a bishop, and one dated ten months later says Augustine had been consecrated on Gregory's command by bishops of the German lands. The historian R. A. Markus discusses the various theories of when and where Augustine was consecrated, and suggests he was consecrated before arriving in England, but argues the evidence does not permit deciding exactly where this took place.

Soon after his arrival, Augustine founded the monastery of Saints Peter and Paul, which later became St Augustine's Abbey, on land donated by the king. In a letter Gregory wrote to the patriarch of Alexandria in 598, he claimed that more than 10,000 Christians had been baptised; the number may be exaggerated, but there is no reason to doubt that a mass conversion took place. However, there were probably some Christians already in Kent before Augustine arrived, remnants of the Christians who lived in Britain in the later Roman Empire. Little literary traces remain of them, however. One other effect of the king's conversion by Augustine's mission was that the Frankish influence on the southern kingdoms of Britain was decreased.

After these conversions, Augustine sent Laurence back to Rome with a report of his success, along with questions about the mission. Bede records the letter and Gregory's replies in chapter 27 of his Historia ecclesiastica gentis Anglorum; this section of the History is usually known as the Libellus responsionum. Augustine asked for Gregory's advice on a number of issues, including how to organise the church, the punishment for church robbers, guidance on who was allowed to marry whom, and the consecration of bishops. Other topics were relations between the churches of Britain and Gaul, childbirth and baptism, and when it was lawful for people to receive communion and for a priest to celebrate mass.

Further missionaries were sent from Rome in 601. They brought a pallium for Augustine and a present of sacred vessels, vestments, relics, and books. (Note: What happened to these items in later years is unknown. Thomas Elmham, a 15th-century chronicler at Canterbury, gave a number of theories of how most of these objects were lost, including being hidden and never recovered during the Danish attacks in the 9th and 10th centuries, hidden and lost after the Norman Conquest of England in 1066, or used for the ransom of King Richard I of England in the 1190s. The surviving St Augustine Gospels, (Corpus Christi College, Cambridge manuscript (MS) 286) which is a 6th-century Italian-illuminated Gospel Book, may be one of the works sent to Augustine. Traditionally, it has been associated with the Gregorian mission. Another possible survival is a Gospel, in an Italian hand, and closely related to the Augustine Gospels, now MS Oxford Bodelian Auctarium D.2.14, which shows evidence of being held in Anglo-Saxon hands during the right time frame. Lastly, a fragment of a work by Gregory the Great, now held by the British Library as part of MS Cotton Titus C, may have arrived with the missionaries.) The pallium was the symbol of metropolitan status, and signified that Augustine was now an archbishop unambiguously associated with the Holy See. Along with the pallium, a letter from Gregory directed the new archbishop to consecrate 12 suffragan bishops as soon as possible and to send a bishop to York. Gregory's plan was that there would be two metropolitans, one at York and one at London, with 12 suffragan bishops under each archbishop. As part of this plan, Augustine was expected to transfer his archiepiscopal see to London from Canterbury. This move never happened; no contemporary sources give the reason, but it was probably because London was not part of Æthelberht's domains. Instead, London was part of the kingdom of Essex, ruled by Æthelberht's nephew Saebert of Essex, who converted to Christianity in 604. The historian Suso Brechter has suggested that the metropolitan see was indeed moved to London, and that it was only with the abandonment of London as a see after the death of Æthelberht that Canterbury became the archiepiscopal see. This theory contradicts Bede's version of events, however.

== Additional work ==
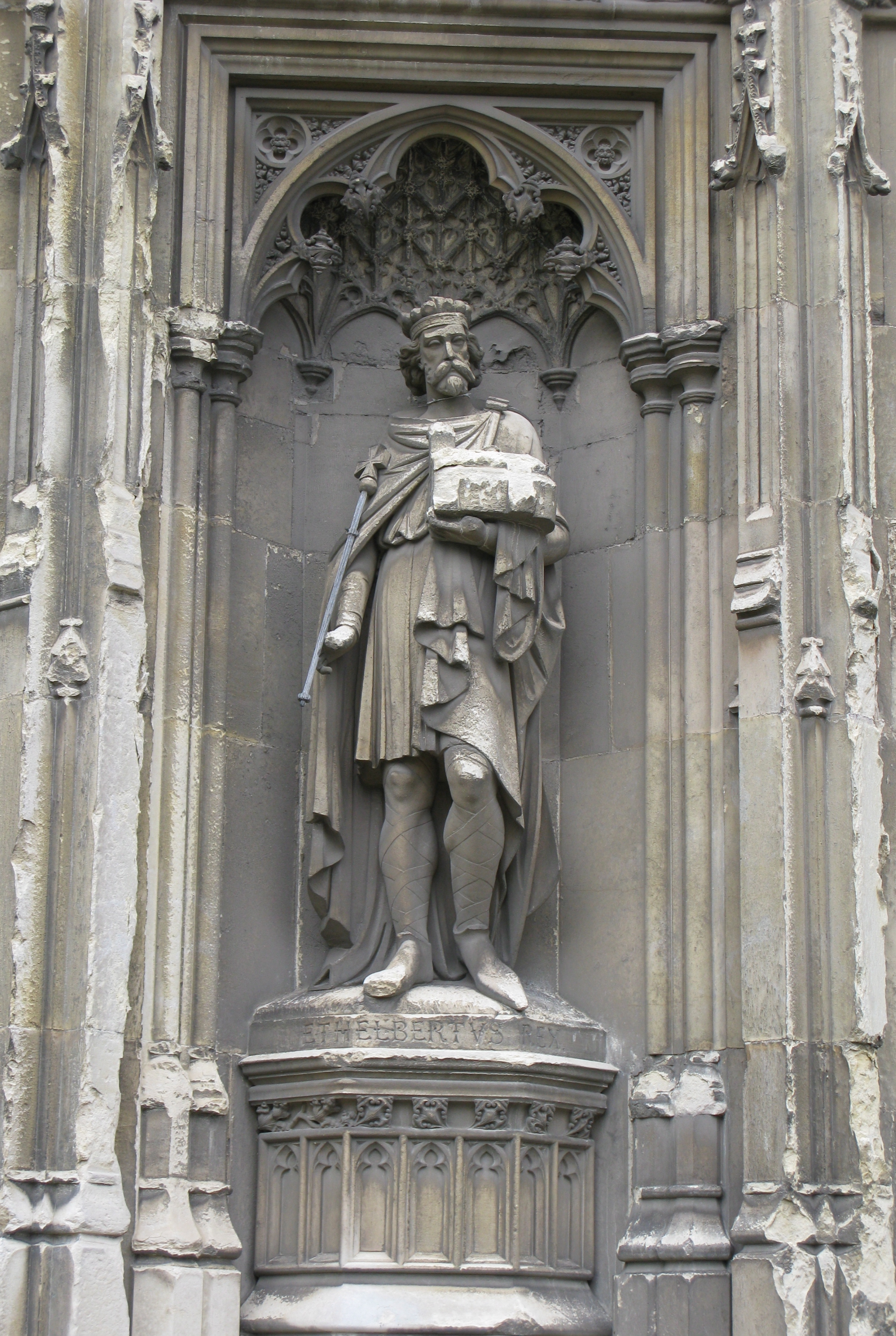
Æthelberht of Kent imagined in a statue at Canterbury Cathedral

In 604, Augustine founded two more bishoprics in Britain. Two men who had come to Britain with him in 601 were consecrated, Mellitus as Bishop of London and Justus as Bishop of Rochester. Bede relates that Augustine, with the help of the king, "recovered" a church built by Roman Christians in Canterbury. (Note: The actual Latin is from Chapter 33, Book 1 of Bede, and an online version is here. The sentence in question is "AT Augustinus, ubi in regia ciuitate sedem episcopalem, ut praediximus, accepit, recuperauit in ea, regio fultus adminiculo, ecclesiam, quam inibi antiquo Romanorum fidelium opere factam fuisse didicerat, et eam in nomine sancti Saluatoris Dei et Domini nostri Iesu Christi sacrauit, atque ibidem sibi habitationem statuit et cunctis successoribus suis." The Latin word recuperauit could be translated either "repaired" or "recovered". Leo Sherley-Price translates the sentence as "Having been granted his episcopal see in the royal capital, as already recorded, Augustine proceeded with the king's help to repair a church he was informed had been built long ago by Roman Christians.") It is not clear if Bede meant that Augustine rebuilt the church or that Augustine merely reconsecrated a building that had been used for pagan worship. Archaeological evidence seems to support the latter interpretation; in 1973 the remains of an aisled building dating from the Romano-British period were uncovered just south of the present Canterbury Cathedral. The historian Ian Wood argues that the existence of the Libellus points to more contact between Augustine and the native Christians because the topics covered in the work are not restricted to conversion from paganism, but also dealt with relations between differing styles of Christianity.

Augustine failed to extend his authority to the Christians in Wales and Dumnonia to the west. Gregory had decreed that these Christians should submit to Augustine and that their bishops should obey him, apparently believing that more of the Roman governmental and ecclesiastical organisation survived in Britain than was actually the case. According to the narrative of Bede, the Britons in these regions viewed Augustine with uncertainty, and their suspicion was compounded by a diplomatic misjudgement on Augustine's part. In 603, Augustine and Æthelberht summoned the British bishops to a meeting south of the Severn. These guests retired early to confer with their people, who, according to Bede, advised them to judge Augustine by the respect he showed at their next meeting. When Augustine failed to rise from his seat on the entrance of the British bishops, they refused to recognise him as their archbishop. There were, however, deep differences between Augustine and the British church that perhaps played a more significant role in preventing an agreement. At issue were the tonsure, the observance of Easter, and practical and deep-rooted differences in approach to asceticism, missionary endeavours, and how the church itself was organised. Some historians believe that Augustine had no real understanding of the history and traditions of the British church, damaging his relations with their bishops. Also, there were political dimensions involved, as Augustine's efforts were sponsored by the Kentish king, and at this period the Wessex and Mercian kingdoms were expanding to the west, into areas held by the Britons.

== Further success ==
Gregory also instructed Augustine on other matters. Temples were to be consecrated for Christian use, and feasts, if possible, moved to days celebrating Christian martyrs. One religious site was revealed to be a shrine of a local St Sixtus, whose worshippers were unaware of details of the martyr's life or death. They may have been native Christians, but Augustine did not treat them as such. When Gregory was informed, he told Augustine to stop the cult and use the shrine for the Roman St Sixtus.

Gregory legislated on the behaviour of the laity and the clergy. He placed the new mission directly under papal authority and made it clear that English bishops would have no authority over Frankish counterparts nor vice versa. Other directives dealt with the training of native clergy and the missionaries' conduct.

The King's School, Canterbury claims Augustine as its founder, making it the world's oldest existing school, but the earliest documentary records date from the 16th century. Augustine did establish a school, and soon after his death Canterbury was able to send teachers out to support the East Anglian mission. Augustine received liturgical books from the pope, but their exact contents are unknown. They may have been some of the new mass books that were being written at this time. The exact liturgy that Augustine introduced to England remains unknown, but it would have been a form of the Latin language liturgy in use at Rome.

== Death and legacy ==
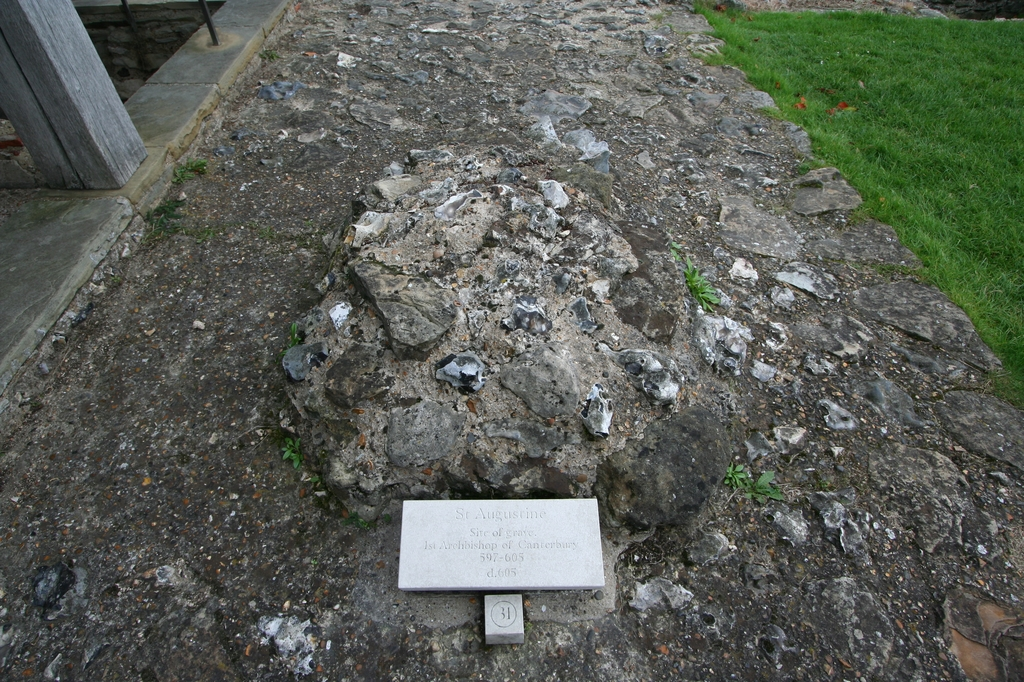
Augustine's gravesite at Canterbury

Before his death, Augustine consecrated Laurence of Canterbury as his successor to the archbishopric, probably to ensure an orderly transfer of office. Although at the time of Augustine's death, 26 May 604, the mission barely extended beyond Kent, his undertaking introduced a more active missionary style into the British Isles. Despite the earlier presence of Christians in Ireland and Wales, no efforts had been made to try to convert the Saxon invaders. Augustine was sent to convert the descendants of those invaders, and eventually became the decisive influence in Christianity in most of the British Isles. Much of his success came about because of Augustine's close relationship with Æthelberht, which gave the archbishop time to establish himself. Augustine's example also influenced the great missionary efforts of the Anglo-Saxon Church.

Augustine's body was originally buried in the portico of what is now St Augustine's, Canterbury, but it was later exhumed and placed in a tomb within the abbey church, which became a place of pilgrimage and veneration. After the Norman Conquest, the cult of St Augustine was actively promoted. After the Conquest, his shrine in St Augustine's Abbey held a central position in one of the axial chapels, flanked by the shrines of his successors Laurence and Mellitus. King Henry I of England granted St. Augustine's Abbey a six-day fair around the date on which Augustine's relics were translated to his new shrine, from 8 September through 13 September.

A life of Augustine was written by Goscelin around 1090, but this life portrays Augustine in a different light compared to Bede's account. Goscelin's account has little new historical content, mainly being filled with miracles and imagined speeches. Building on this account, later medieval writers continued to add new miracles and stories to Augustine's life, often quite fanciful. These authors included William of Malmesbury, who claimed that Augustine founded Cerne Abbey, the author (generally believed to be John Brompton) of a late medieval chronicle containing invented letters from Augustine, and a number of medieval writers who included Augustine in their romances. Another problem with investigating Augustine's saintly cult is the confusion resulting because most medieval liturgical documents mentioning Augustine do not distinguish between Augustine of Canterbury and Augustine of Hippo, a fourth-century saint. Medieval Scandinavian liturgies feature Augustine of Canterbury quite often, however. During the English Reformation, Augustine's shrine was destroyed, and his relics were lost.

Augustine's shrine was re-established in March 2012 at the church of St. Augustine in Ramsgate, Kent, very close to the mission's landing site. St Augustine's Cross, a Celtic cross erected in 1884, marks the spot in Ebbsfleet, Thanet, East Kent, where the newly arrived Augustine is said to have first met and preached to the awaiting King Ethelbert.

== See also ==
- List of members of the Gregorian mission

== Citations ==
Christian titles
| New title | Archbishop of Canterbury; 597–604 | Succeeded by Laurence |
