= Saint Gebuin =

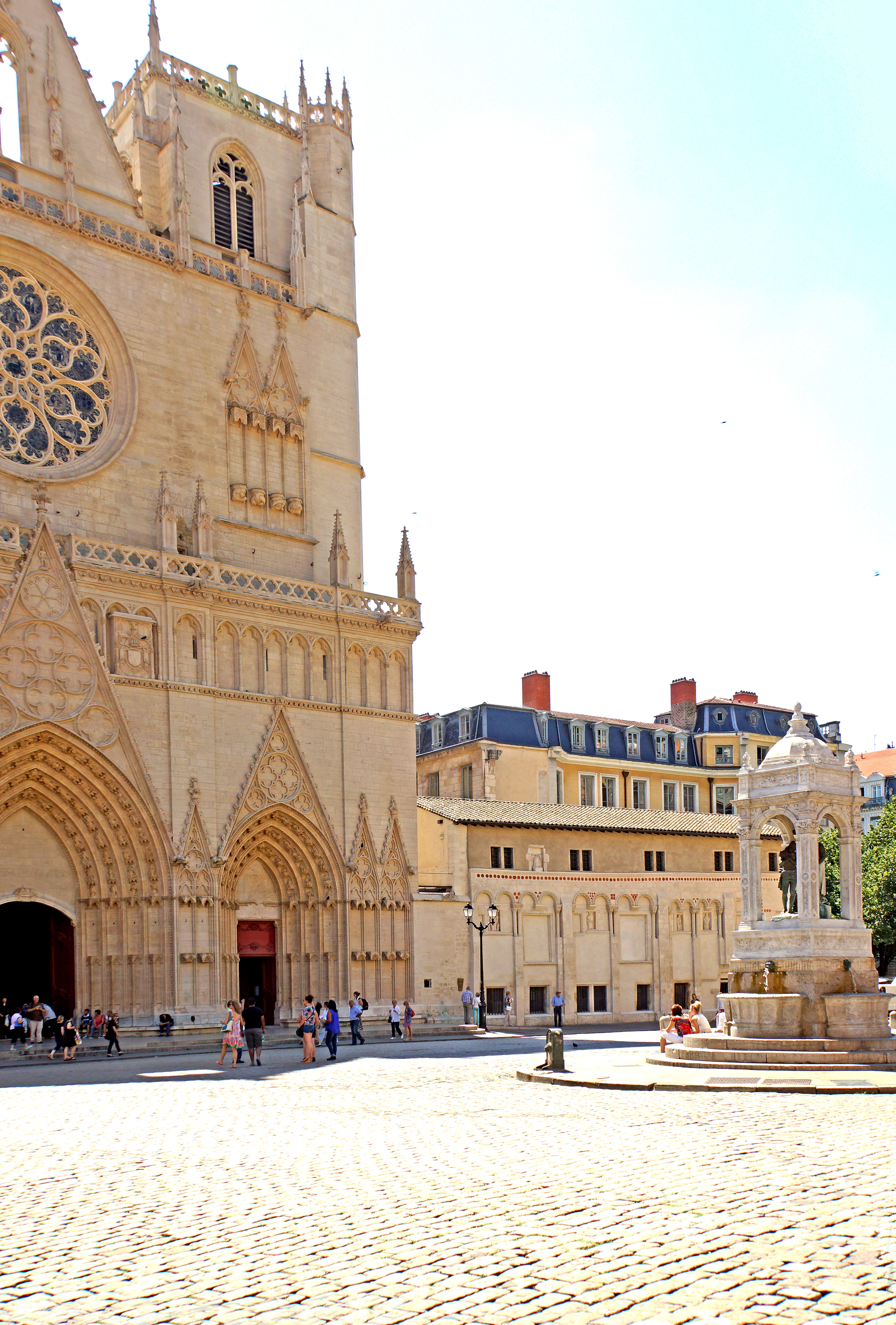
Lyon Cathedral.

Gebuin or Gibuin was the archbishop of Lyon from 1077 to 1082.

A native of Lotharingia, there he was a canon of Langres in 1059 and archdeacon in 1068. He succeeds Umberto II in 1077, supported by the papal legate and future successor Hugh of Die, and is canonically elected at a council meeting in Autun by the church representative of Lyon.

In 1079, he traveled to Rome and Pope Gregory VII receives a papal bull of 19 April 1079 granting (or confirming) the primacy of the Archbishop of Lyon on four ecclesiastical provinces of Lyon, Sens, Rouen and Tours.

As Primate he tried to make the clergy in Tours relinquish property that had been acquired unjustly. However he met with resistance and delay by the clergy of that diocese. In 1080 1 Gébuin gives the church of Boisse with all his parish, and two chaplaincies, to the order of Saint-Ruf, who established a priory. The same year, he donated the church of Saint-Oyen Meillonnas, the Saint-Pierre church of religious

He is considered to be a Catholic saint; on his feast day is 18 April1.
