= 374 Burgundia =

Main-belt asteroid

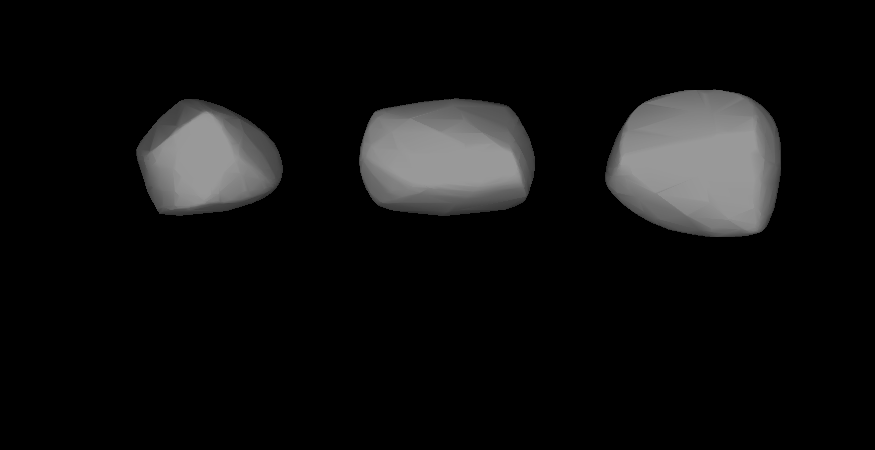
- Lightcurve-base 3D-model of 374 Burgundia.

Discovery
- Discovered by: Auguste Charlois
- Discovery date: 18 September 1893

Designations
- Pronunciation: /bɜːrˈɡʌndiə/
- Named after: Burgundy
- Alternative designations: 1893 AK
- Minor planet category: Main belt

Orbital characteristics
- Epoch 21 November 2025 (JD 2461000.5)
- Uncertainty parameter 0
- Observation arc: 122 years
- Aphelion: 3.002 AU (449.1 million km)
- Perihelion: 2.556 AU (382.4 million km)
- Semi-major axis: 2.779 AU (415.7 million km)
- Eccentricity: 0.0802
- Orbital period (sidereal): 4.63 yr (1692 d)
- Mean anomaly: 294.1°
- Mean motion: 0° 12^{m} 45^{s} / day
- Inclination: 8.991°
- Longitude of ascending node: 218.9°
- Time of perihelion: 26 September 2026
- Argument of perihelion: 29.05°

Physical characteristics
- Dimensions: 44.67±1.3 km
- Synodic rotation period: 6.962 h (0.2901 d)
- Geometric albedo: 0.3014±0.018
- Spectral type: S
- Absolute magnitude (H): 8.67, 8.68

374 Burgundia is a typical main belt asteroid that was discovered by Auguste Charlois on 18 September 1893 in Nice. It was named for the former French region of Burgundy. It is one of seven of Charlois's discoveries that was expressly named by the Astromomisches Rechen-Institut (Astronomical Calculation Institute). The asteroid came to opposition on 18 April 2026 in Virgo at apparent magnitude 12.

Burgundia was long thought to be a member of the now defunct Ceres asteroid family, but it was found to be an unrelated interloper in that group based on its non-matching composition.

In 2021, light curve data was used to build a shape model using the light curve inversion process. The study found a rotation period of 6.96397±0.00002 hours. Two possible solutions to the pole of rotation were computed.
