= Amédée de Talaru =

Amédée de Talaru (born in Lyon; died in Lyon on 11 February 1444) was a French pseudocardinal appointed by the Antipope, Felix V. He was a nephew of pseudo-cardinal Jean de Talaru who like Amédée de Talaru had also been archbishop of Lyon. He was also Primate of Gaul.

Amédée de Talaru was canon of Saint-Just church and canon, grand canon and archdeacon of St. John of Lyon. He attended the Council of Constance as a member of the Chapter of Lyons and the Council of Basel. Talaru was elected archbishop of Lyon in 1415 which made him Primate of Lyon, Rouen, Tours and Sens. The anti-pope Felix V created him cardinal in the consistory of 12 November 1440.

== See also ==
- Catholic Church in France

Catholic Church titles
Preceded by Philippe III de Thurey	Archbishop of Lyon; 1415-1444	Succeeded by Philippe III de Thurey
