= Philippe III de Thurey =

Archbishop of Lyon

Philippe Thurey (died in Lyon 28 November 1415) was the Roman Catholic Archbishop of Lyon from 1389 to 1415.

As the nephew of Guillaume II de Thurey (who had been Archbishop of Lyon from 1358 to 1365), Philippe was born in Narbonne to 1335 Girard Thurey and Jeanne de la Palud and was the brother of Pierre de Thury, Bishop of Maillezais, and a man named Renaud, Dean of the Chapter Saint John. He began his religious career as canon-count chapter of St. John's Cathedral in 1364, was made cantor of the chapter in 1372, and combined the same year with the title of Marshal of Fourvière. In 1376 he also became a canon of the chapter of Saint-Just.

Elected Archbishop of Lyon in 1389, he immediately continued the fight of his predecessors against the influence of the king's officers and their justice in the city. In particular, he protested against their presence in the city, in the House of Roanne.

== Expulsion of the king's officers ==
Letters patent of 3 April 1393 authorized him to have search of the city for the king's officers and Philippe de Thurey had put these letters in execution by a man named Givry. The latter, preceded by several clergymen carrying lanterns, went to Roanne hotel and expelled the Seneschal. He removed the king's court, and arranged for a man named Cartula to ride backwards on a donkey along the city's streets, shouting "everything is won, we have no king!". The Parliament of Paris, by judgment of 5 October 1394, counteracted the letters patent of 5 April 1393 and punished Givry and Catula, and ordered the archbishop to pay damages to the king's officers, who were immediately restored. Despite this decision, Philippe Thurey disturbed more than once the royal officers in the exercise of their duties.

== Latter Life ==
Coat of arms of Thurey

He had been successful in 1393, with popular support. However, the arrival of Amédée II de Talaru nephew of his predecessor changed that. His right to coin money was abolished, but he managed to maintain primacy of the Church of Lyons over Rouen and Paris.

In 1409, he attended the Council of Pisa. In 1415, Philippe de Thurey appointed as abbot of Savigny one of his own nephews. The monks who refused to accept the appointment were excommunicated. He financially supported the completion of the roof of the Cathedral of St. John and directed interior renovations in the St. Stephen Church inb Lyon.

At his death, he was probably buried in Holy Sepulchre Chapel of the Cathedral lyonnaise.

His coat of arms included an image of Gules of a gold necklace. The shield was placed on the episcopal cross, which in some cases charging the shield.

Catholic Church titles
Preceded by Jean II de Talaru	Bishop of Lyon; 1389–1415	Succeeded by Amédée II de Talaru
