= Peter of Savoy (archbishop of Lyon) =

Archbishop of Lyon

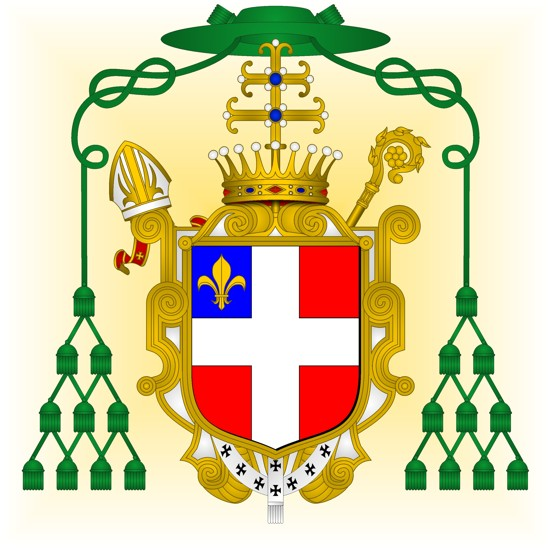
Arms of Peter of Savoy

Peter of Savoy (French: Pierre de Savoie; Died November 1332) was a member of the House of Savoy and a prelate of the 14th century.

== Biography ==
Peter was the son of Count Thomas III of Piedmont and his wife Guia de Bourgogne. His date of birth is unknown. He is mentioned along with his brothers in his father's will dated 14 May 1282 ("Philippum de Sabaudia filium meum primogenitum [...] aliis filiis meis Petro, Thomæ, Amedeo et Guillermo fratribus suis"), as well as in a charter of 24 May 1286 ("Philippi Petri Thome Amedei et Guillelmi"). In 1304, he was dean of Salisbury Cathedral and a canon at Lyon.

=== Archbishop of Lyon ===
In December 1307, Peter was appointed Archbishop of Lyon and Primate of Gaul. Unlike his predecessor, Louis de Villars, Peter did not accept the gradual takeover of Lyon by the kingdom of France. He therefore encouraged the residents to revolt, and encouraged them to strengthen the city walls, and he put aside the historical dispute between the archbishop and the cathedral chapter, and challenged the presence of the "gardiateur" (overseer) imposed by the king of France, Philip the Fair, thus providing a pretext for Philip to send his son Louis, King of Navarre, and his brother Charles, Count of Valois with an army to besiege Lyon in 1310.

The war ended with the intervention of Peter's uncle, Amadeus V, Count of Savoy, who reluctantly sided with the French king to avoid becoming the king's next victim. A treaty was signed on 10 April 1312, by which the archbishop lost control of the administration of justice in Lyon to the king, and was obliged to agree to the incorporation of Lyon into the kingdom of France. A definitive treaty of 4 April 1320 with the new king, Philip V, restored the jurisdiction of the city to the archbishop, but under royal sovereignty. The people of Lyon received several franchises, such as the right to set taxes for the benefit of the city.

However, the king refused the archbishop's demands for compensation for the depredations of the royal troops during the siege, both for their mistreatment of the inhabitants and particularly of the clergy. These were the subject of two written memoranda, one composed by the clerics of Lyon between the opening of the Council of Vienne on 16 October 1311 and the treaty of 10 April 1312, called Gravamina or Grauamina, the other by the prosecutor of the bailiff of Mâcon, between this treaty and the end of 1312, called Avisamenta. The first sought to demonstrate the enormity of the royal depredations, setting the cost of them at 150,000 livres tournois; the second, on the contrary, minimized them, putting the cost at only 10,000 livres tournois. Of this, the royal treasury only paid 2,000 livres, to which the king added, by "royal munificence" (Latin: sua munificentia regalis) 500 more. These compensations, such as they were, were paid to the archbishop on 27 December 1312.

Also during his term of office Chazeaux Abbey was founded for a community of Poor Clares at Firminy. In 1316, the archbishop saw the election and coronation of Pope John XXII in Lyon.

== Family ==
Peter had an illegitimate son by an unknown mother:

- Jean la Mitre,(d. 1348), "knight and bastard of Savoy", Lord of Cuine, buried at Montmelian
