= Priscus of Lyon =

Priscus was a bishop of Lyon who exercised his office from 573 to sometime between 584 and 589.

== History ==
Priscus succeeded Nizier of Lyon in 573. While his predecessor had advised (Ætherius) Etherus to take the diocese, King Gontran named Priscus instead.

There is little information about Priscus' character, no evidence either of indignity, or of particular pastoral zeal. His metrical episcopal epitaph allows us to know that he came from the nobility and that he held political office before becoming a bishop.

One of his rare known actions is the meeting of a provincial council in 583 in Lyon. Also present were the bishops Evantius of Vienne, Syagrius of Autun, Isice I of Grenoble, Isaac I of Valence, Eusebius of Mâcon, Agricola of Nevers and Veranus of Cavaillon. Among the decisions, the sixth and last canon decided to open at the expense of the bishop a leprosarium in each city.
