= Archdiocese of Lyon =

Roman Catholic Metropolitan archdiocese in Lyon, France

Coordinates: 45°45′39″N 4°49′37″E

Archdiocese of Lyon Archidiœcesis Lugdunensis Archidiocèse de Lyon

Catholic
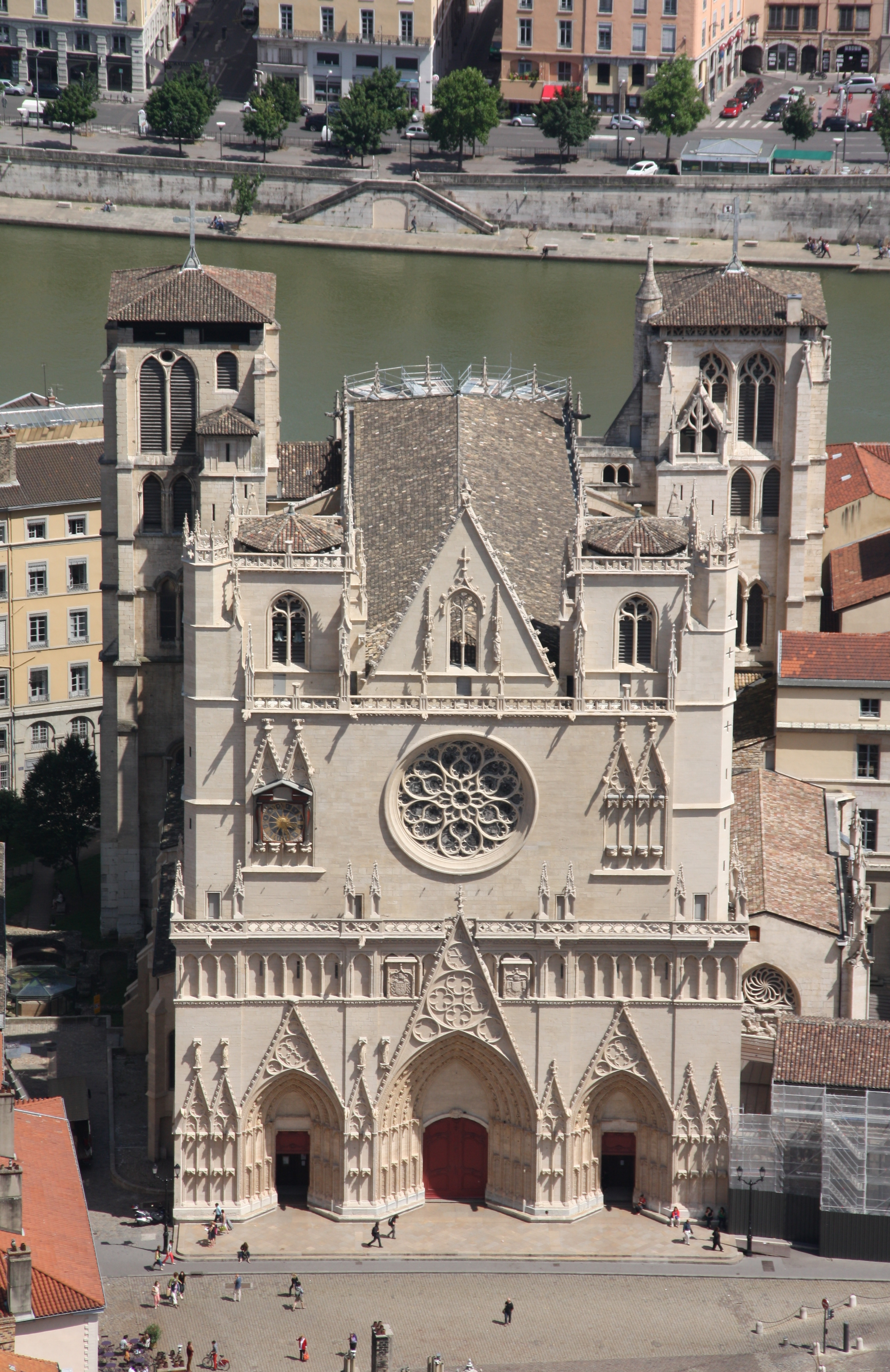
- Lyon Cathedral

Location
- Country: France
- Territory: Rhône, Loire
- Ecclesiastical province: Lyon

Statistics
- Area: 5,087 km^{2} (1,964 sq mi)
- Population: Total; Catholics: (as of 2021); 2,038,830 ▲; 1,304,240 ▲ (64%)
- Parishes: 132 ▼

Information
- Denomination: Catholic
- Sui iuris church: Latin Church
- Rite: Roman Rite
- Established: 2nd century
- Cathedral: Primatial Cathedral of St. John the Baptist in Lyon
- Patron saint: St. Irenaeus of Lyon; Saint Pothinus
- Secular priests: 260 (diocesan) ▼52 (Religious Orders) ▼90 Permanent Deacons ▲

Current leadership
- Pope: Leo XIV
- Metropolitan Archbishop: Olivier de Germay
- Suffragans: Diocese of Grenoble–Vienne-les-Allobroges; Diocese of Valence; Diocese of Viviers; Diocese of Belley–Ars; Archdiocese of Chambéry, Saint-Jean-de-Maurienne, and Tarentaise; Diocese of Annecy; Diocese of Saint-Étienne
- Auxiliary Bishops: Patrick Le Gal; Loïc Lagadec; Thierry Brac de La Perrière
- Bishops emeritus: Philippe Barbarin

Map

Website
- lyon.catholique.fr

Ecclesiastical province of Lyon

The Archdiocese of Lyon (Latin: Archidiœcesis Lugdunensis; French: Archidiocèse de Lyon), formerly the Archdiocese of Lyon–Vienne–Embrun, is a Latin Church metropolitan archdiocese of the Catholic Church in France, seated in the city of Lyon. It is the oldest diocese in France and one of the oldest in Western Christianity. The archbishops of Lyon hold the honorary title of primates of Gaul. They are traditionally elevated by the pope to the rank of cardinal.

Olivier de Germay was appointed archbishop of Lyon on 22 October 2020. He is assisted by three auxiliary bishops: Patrick Le Gal (since 2009), Loïc Lagadec, and Thierry Brac de La Perrière (both since 2022).

== History ==
In the Notitia Galliarum of the 5th century, the Roman Provincia Gallia Lugdunensis Prima contained the cities of Metropolis civitas Lugdunensium (Lyon), Civitas Aeduorum (Autun), Civitas Lingonum (Langres), Castrum Cabilonense (Chaâlons-sur-Saône) and Castrum Matisconense (Mâcon).

The confluence of the Rhône and the Saône, where sixty Gallic tribes had erected the altar to Rome and Augustus, was also the centre from which Christianity was propagated throughout Gaul.

=== Persecution ===
The presence at Lyon of numerous Asiatic Christians and their communications with the Orient were likely to arouse the susceptibilities of the Gallo-Romans. A persecution arose under Marcus Aurelius. Its victims at Lyon numbered forty-eight, half of them of Greek origin, half Gallo-Roman, among others Saint Blandina, and Saint Pothinus, first Bishop of Lyon, sent to Gaul by Saint Polycarp about the middle of the 2nd century. The legend according to which Pothinus was sent by Pope Clement I dates from the 12th century and is without foundation.

The "Deacon of Vienne", mentioned in the letter of the faithful of Vienne and Lyon to the Christians of Asia and Phrygia, who was martyred at Lyon during the persecution of 177, was probably a deacon installed at Vienne by the ecclesiastical authority of Lyon. Tradition represents the church of Ainay as erected at the place of their martyrdom. The crypt of Saint Pothinus, under the choir of the church of St. Nizier, was destroyed in 1884. But there still exists at Lyon the purported prison cell of Pothinus, where Anne of Austria, Louis XIV, and Pius VII came to pray, and the crypt of Saint Irenaeus built at the end of the 5th century by Archbishop Patiens, which contains his remains.

Irenaeus sent out missionaries through the Gauls, as local legends of Besançon and of several other cities indicate. There are numerous funerary inscriptions of primitive Christianity in Lyon; the earliest dates from the year 334. Faustinus, bishop in the second half of the 3rd century, wrote to Cyprian of Carthage, who speaks of him in a letter to Pope Stephen I, in 254, regarding the Novatian tendencies of Marcian, Bishop of Arles.

But when Diocletian's new provincial organization (the Tetrarchy) had taken away from Lyon its position as metropolis of the three Gauls, the prestige of Lyon diminished.

Around the year 470, Lyon fell into the hands of the Burgundians, and around 479 the city of Langres as well.

=== Merovingian period ===
From Saint Eucherius (c. 433–50), a monk of Lérins and the author of homilies, doubtless dates the foundation at Lyon of the "hermitages". Bishop Patiens (456–98) successfully combated famine and Arianism, and whom Sidonius Apollinaris praised in a poem; Bishop Stephanus (d. before 515), with Bishop Avitus of Vienne convoked a council at Lyon for the conversion of the Arians. Bishop Viventolius (515–523) in 517 presided with Bishop Avitus at the Council of Epaone.

When Burgundian power collapsed under the repeated assaults of the Franks in 534, its territory was divided up, and the third son of Clovis, the Merovingian Childebert I, received Lyon.

Lupus, a monk, afterwards bishop (535–42), was probably the first to be called a metropolitan archbishop; in 538, the Council of Orléans used the title of "metropolitanus". Sacerdos (549–542) presided in 549 at the Council of Orléans, and obtained from King Childebert the foundation of the general hospital; Saint Nicetius (552–73) received from the pope the title of patriarch, and whose tomb was honoured by miracles. The prestige of Saint Nicetius was lasting; his successor Saint Priseus (573–588) bore the title of patriarch, and brought the council of 585 to decide that national synods should be convened every three years at the instance of the patriarch and of the king; (Ætherius) Etherus, the Bishop of Lyon (588–603), who was a correspondent of Pope Gregory I, and who perhaps consecrated Saint Augustine, the Apostle of England; Saint Annemundus or Chamond (c. 650), friend of Saint Wilfrid, godfather of Clotaire III, put to death by Ebroin together with his brother, and patron of the town of Saint-Chamond, Loire; Saint Genesius or Genes (660–679 or 680), Benedictine abbot of Fontenelle, grand almoner and minister of Queen Bathilde; Saint Lambertus (c. 680–690), also abbot of Fontenelle.

At the end of the 5th century Lyon was the capital of the Kingdom of Burgundy, but after 534 it passed under the domination of the Frankish kings.

=== Carolingian period ===
Ravaged by the Saracens in 725, the city was restored through the liberality of Charlemagne who established a rich library in the monastery of Ile Barbe in the Saône, just north of Lugdunum. The letter of Leidradus to Charlemagne (807) shows the care taken by the emperor for the restoration of learning in Lyon. With the aid of the deacon Florus he made the school so prosperous that in the 10th century Englishmen went there to study.

Under Charlemagne and his immediate successors, the Bishops of Lyon, whose ascendancy was attested by the number of councils over which they were called to preside, played an important theological part. Adoptionism had no more active enemies than Leidradus (798–814) and Agobard (814–840). When Felix of Urgel continued rebellious to the condemnations pronounced against adoptionism from 791 to 799 by the Councis of Ciutad, Friuli, Ratisbon, Frankfort, and Rome, Charlemagne sent to Urgel Nimfridius of Narbonne, Benedict of Aniane, and Archbishop Leidradus, a native of Nuremberg and Charlemagne's librarian. They preached against Adoptionism in Spain, conducted Felix in 799 to the Council of Aachen where he seemed to submit to the arguments of Alcuin; he was then brought back to his diocese. But the submission of Felix was not complete; Agobard, "Chorepiscopus" of Lyon, convicted him anew of adoptionism in a secret conference, and when Felix died in 815 there was found among his papers a treatise in which he professed adoptionism. Then Agobard, who had become Archbishop of Lyon in 814 after Leidradus' retirement to the Abbey of St. Medard, Soissons, composed a long treatise against that heresy.

==== Agobard and Remy ====
Archbishop Agobard of Lyon displayed great activity as a pastor and a publicist in his opposition to the Jews and to various superstitions. His rooted hatred for all superstition led him in his treatise on images into certain expressions which savoured of Iconoclasm. The five historical treatises which he wrote in 833 to justify the deposition of Louis the Pious, who had been his benefactor, are a stain on his reputation. Louis the Pious, having been restored to power, caused Agobard to be deposed in 835 by the Council of Thionville, but three years later gave him back his see, in which he died in 840. During the exile of Agobard the See of Lyon had been for a short time administered by Amalarius of Metz, whom the deacon Florus of Lyon, the master of the cathedral school, charged with heretical opinions regarding the "triforme corpus Christi." Florus also took part in the controversies with Gottschalk on the subject of predestination.

It has been contended that there was a university (studium generale) at Lyons by the 13th century, but this has been strongly denied.

Amolon (841–852) and Remy (852–75) continued the struggle against the heresy of predestination. At the Council of Valence in January 855, presided over by Archbishop Remy, this heresy was condemned. Remy also was engaged in strife with Archbishop Hincmar of Reims.

=== Political realignments ===
From 879 to 1032 Lyon formed part of the Kingdom of Provence and afterwards of the second Kingdom of Burgundy. In 1032 Rudolph III of Burgundy died, and the Burgundian kingdom eventually went to Conrad II. The portion of Lyon situated on the left (eastern) bank of the Saône became, at least nominally, an imperial city. Finally Archbishop Burchard II, brother of Rudolph, claimed rights of sovereignty over Lyon as inherited from his mother, Matilda, daughter of Louis IV of France; in this way the government of Lyon, instead of being exercised by the distant emperor, became a matter of dispute between the counts who claimed the inheritance and the successive archbishops.

In 1025, the second Archbishop Burchard held a council at Anse, on the Saône some 28 km north of Lyon, attended by the archbishops of Vienne and Tarentaise, and nine bishops (Autunm Mâcon, Chalon-sur-Saône, Auxerre, Valence, Grenoble Uzès, Aosta, and Maurienne). At the council the bishop of Mâcon complained that Archbishop Burchard of Vienne had ordained priests from the abbey of Cluny, which was in his diocese and under his jurisdiction. Abbot Odilon testified for the archbishop of Vienne, but the council ruled that his actions were uncanonical and the archbishop of Vienne was made to apologize and make reparation. In the next year, however, the monks of Cluny obtained a privilege from Pope John XIX, which allowed their action.

Pope Victor II (Gebhard) was appointed at Mainz in September 1054 by the Emperor Henry III, who had met there with representatives from Rome, including the Subdeacon Hildebrand, following the death of Pope Leo IX. Victor was known to be a promoter of church reform. He immediately appointed two papal vicars for France, Archbishop Raimbaud of Arles and Archbishop Pontius of Aix. The subdeacon Hildebrand, was sent to Lyon, where he held a council there in 1055, to deal with simoniacal bishops. In 1076, as Gregory VII, he deposed Archbishop Humbert (1063–76) for simony.

=== Primacy of Lyon confirmed ===
Archbishop Gebuin (Jubinus), who succeeded Humbert, was the confidant of Gregory VII and contributed to the reform of the Church. The papal legate, Hugues de Die, presided at the two councils of Lyon in 1080 and 1082, at which Manasses of Reims, Fulk of Anjou, and the monks of Marmoutiers were excommunicated. Archbishop Achard of Arles was deposed.

It was during the episcopate of Gebuin, and at his request, that Pope Gregory VII, in the Bull "Antiquorum Sanctorum Patrum" of 20 April 1079, confirmed. The primacy of the Church of Lyon over the provinces of Rouen, Tours, and Sens.

In 1112, Archbishop Jauceran (1107–1118), having decided to hold a council at Anse, sent out summonses to attend to all the bishops of the ecclesiastical provinces of Sens, Rouen, and Tours, including the archbishop of Sens and all his suffragan bishops, including Ivo of Chartres. Archbishop Daimbertus of Sens immediately held a provincial synod, and the bishops collectively sent a tart and lengthy synodal letter to Archbishop Jauceran, protesting the tone and content of his letter of summons, and his application of the relevant documents. They were happy, they said, to accept his invitation, but not on the terms stated. It was unheard of that a bishop be summoned outside of his own province, except under papal orders. Archbishop Jauceran replied in a letter directed to Archbishop Daimbertus, relying on contentious rhetoric and fallacious reasoning. He also procured from Pope Paschal II a bull, "Caritatis bonum est," dated 14 March 1116, confirming the privileges of the archbishops of Lyon, including the primacy over the ecclesiastical provinces of Rouen, Tours and Sens.

The dignity was confirmed by Callistus II, despite the letter written to him in 1126 by Louis VI in favour of the church of Sens. As far as it regarded the province of Rouen this letter was later suppressed by a decree of the king's council in 1702, at the request of Jacques-Nicolas Colbert, Archbishop of Rouen.

==== Metropolitan ====
The archbishop of Lyon is the metropolitan of the ecclesiastical province which includes:

- Annecy
- Belley-Ars
- Archdiocese of Chambéry
- Grenoble-Vienne
- Saint-Étienne
- Valence (-Die-Saint-Paul-Trois-Châteaux)
- Viviers

==== Primate ====
As Primate of the Gauls, the archbishop of Lyon has precedence over:

- Ecclesiastical Province of Rouen
- Eccleasiastical Province of Tours
- Sens (former province)

=== Cathedral and Chapter ===
The cathedral of the diocese of Lyon was originally dedicated to S. Stephen, but the dedication to S. John the Baptist was added later. The cathedral was administered by a corporation called the Chapter, which consisted of eight dignities and thirty-two canon-counts. The dignities were: the Dean, the Archdeacon, the Precentor, the Cantor, the Chamberlain, tÉhe Aedituus, the Provost, and the Chorus master. Each candidate for a canonry had to demonstrate nobility on both sides of his family for at least four generations.

Hugh of Die (1081–1106), the successor of Saint Gebuin, friend of Saint Anselm, and for a while legate of Gregory VII in France and Burgundy, had differences later on with Victor III, who excommunicated him for a time. Pope Paschal II came to Lyon, and on 29 January 1107 (1106, Roman Style), consecrated the church of Ainay Abbey, and dedicated one of its altars in honour of the Immaculate Conception. The Feast of the Immaculate Conception was solemnized at Lyon about 1128, perhaps at the instance of Saint Anselm of Canterbury, and Saint Bernard wrote to the canons of Lyon to complain that they should not have instituted a feast without consulting the pope.

=== Sovereignty ===
Lyon of the 12th century had a glorious place in the history of Catholic liturgy and even of dogma, but the 12th century was also marked by the heresy of Peter Waldo and the Waldenses, the Poor Men of Lyon, who were opposed by Archbishop John of Canterbury (Jean des Belles-Mains) (1181–1193).

In 1157 Emperor Frederick Barbarossa confirmed the sovereignty of the Archbishops over the city of Lyon, and the regalian rights over the extent of diocesan territory on the left bank of the Saône; they were also granted general jurisdiction over imperial territories, whether inside the diocese of Lyon or outside it; the archbishop was also named exarch of the royal palace in Burgundy and first dignitary in the imperial council. Thenceforth there was a lively contest between them and the counts. An arbitration effected by the pope in 1167 had no result, but by the treaty of 1173, Guy, Count of Forez, ceded to the canons of the primatial church of St. John his title of count of Lyon and his temporal authority.

Then came the growth of the Commune, more belated in Lyon than in many other cities, but in 1193 the archbishop had to make some concession to the citizens. The 13th century was a period of conflict. Three times, in 1207, 1269, and 1290, grave troubles broke out between the partisans of the archbishop who dwelt in the château of Pierre Seize, those of the count-canons who lived in a separate quarter near the cathedral, and partisans of the townsfolk. Gregory X attempted without success to restore peace by two Acts, 2 April 1273 and 11 November 1274. The kings of France were always inclined to side with the commune; after the siege of Lyon by Louis X (1310), the treaty of 10 April 1312 definitively attached Lyon to the Kingdom of France, but until the beginning of the 15th century the Church of Lyon was allowed to coin its own money.

If the 13th century had imperiled the political sovereignty of the archbishops, it had on the other hand made Lyon a kind of refuge from an unfriendly Rome for the papal court. The future Innocent V was Archbishop of Lyon from 1272 to 1273. Innocent IV and Gregory X, a former canon of Lyon, sought refuge at Lyon from the Hohenstaufen, and held there two general councils of Lyon. Local tradition relates that it was on seeing the red hat of the canons of Lyon that the courtiers of Innocent IV conceived the idea of obtaining from the Council of Lyon its decree that the cardinals should henceforth wear red hats. The sojourn of Innocent IV at Lyon was marked by numerous works of public utility, to which the pope gave vigorous encouragement. He granted indulgences to the faithful who should assist in the construction of the bridge over the Rhône, replacing that destroyed about 1190 by the passage of the troops of Richard Cœur de Lion on their way to the Crusade. The building of the churches of St. John and St. Justus was pushed forward with activity; he sent delegates even to England to solicit alms for this purpose and he consecrated the high altar in both churches.

At Lyon were crowned Clement V (1305) and Pope John XXII (1310); at Lyon in 1449 the antipope Felix V renounced the tiara; there, too, was held in 1512, without any definite conclusion, the last session of the schismatical Council of Pisa against Julius II.

In 1516, following the papal loss of the Battle of Marignano, Pope Leo X signed a concordat with King Francis I of France, removing the rights of all French entities which held the right to elect to a benefice, including bishoprics, canonicates, and abbeys, and granting the kings of France the right to nominate candidates to all these benefices, provided they be suitable persons, and subject to confirmation of the nomination by the pope. This removed the right of cathedral chapters to elect their bishop, or even to request the pope to name a bishop. The Concordat of Bologna was strongly protested by the University of Paris and by the Parliament of Paris.

=== Counter-reformation ===
Jean Charlier de Gerson, the former Chancellor of the University of Paris and leading theologian of the Council of Constance, whose old age was spent at Lyon in the abbey of St. Paul, where he instructed poor children, died there in 1429.

M. Guigue has catalogued the eleven "hermitages" (eight of them for men and three for women) which were distinctive of the ascetical life of Christian Lyon in the Middle Ages; these were cells in which persons shut themselves up for life after four years of trial. The system of hermitages along the lines described by Grimalaius and Olbredus in the 9th century flourished especially from the 11th to the 13th century, and disappeared completely in the 16th. These hermitages were the private property of a neighbouring church or monastery, which installed therein for life a male or female recluse. The general almshouse of Lyon, or charity hospital, was founded in 1532 after the great famine of 1531; it was under the supervision of eight administrators chosen from among the more important citizens.

On 12 April 1549, Pope Paul III secularized the monastery of l'Ile Barbe, converting it into a collegiate church, with a Chapter headed by a Dean, who assumed the title of abbot, a Provost (the former Prior), and an Archdeacon (the former Cellerier).

In 1560 the Calvinists took Lyon by surprise, but they were driven out by Antoine d'Albon, Abbot of Savigny and later Archbishop of Lyon. The Protestants again took Lyon in 1562; they were driven out by the Maréchal de Vieuville. At the command of Baron des Adrets they committed numerous acts of violence in the region of Montbrison. It was at Lyon that Henry IV of France, the converted Calvinist king, married Marie de' Medici (9 December 1600).

Saint Francis de Sales died at Lyon on 28 December 1622. The Curé Colombet de St. Amour was celebrated at St. Étienne in the 17th century for the generosity with which he founded the Hôtel-Dieu (the charity hospital) and free schools, and also fed the workmen during the famine of 1693.

==== Jubilees at Lyon ====
The institution of the jubilee of Saint Nizier dates beyond a doubt to the stay of Innocent IV at Lyon. This jubilee, which had all the privileges of the jubilees of Rome, was celebrated each time that Low Thursday, the feast of Saint Nizier, coincided with 2 April, i.e. whenever the feast of Easter itself was on the earliest day allowed by the paschal cycle, namely 22 March. In 1818, when this coincidence occurred, the feast of Saint Nizier was not celebrated. But the cathedral of St. John also enjoys a great jubilee each time that the feast of Saint John the Baptist coincides with Corpus Christi, that is, whenever the feast of Corpus Christi falls on 24 June. It is certain that in 1451 the coincidence of these two feasts was celebrated with special splendour by the population of Lyon, then emerging from the troubles of the Hundred Years' War, but there is no document to prove that the jubilee indulgence existed at that date. However, Lyonnese tradition places the first great jubilee in 1451; subsequent jubilees took place in 1546, 1666, 1734 and 1886.

=== Controversy over liturgy and liturgical books ===
"Among the Churches of France", wrote Saint Bernard to the canons of Lyon, "that of Lyon has hitherto had ascendancy over all the others, as much for the dignity of its see as for its praiseworthy institutions. It is especially in the Divine Office that this judicious Church has never readily acquiesced in unexpected and sudden novelties, and has never submitted to be tarnished by innovations which are becoming only to youth."

In the 18th century Archbishop Antoine de Montazet (1758–1788), contrary to the Bull of Pius V on the breviary, changed the text of the breviary and the missal, from which there resulted a century of conflict for the Church of Lyon. The efforts of Pope Pius IX and Cardinal Bonald to suppress the innovations of Montazet provoked resistance on the part of the canons, who feared an attempt against the traditional Lyonnese ceremonies. This culminated in 1861 in a protest on the part of the clergy and the laity, as much with regard to the civil power as to the Vatican. Finally, on 4 February 1864, at a reception of the parish priests of Lyon, Pius IX declared his displeasure at this agitation and assured them that nothing should be changed in the ancient Lyonnese ceremonies; by a Brief of 17 March 1864, he ordered the progressive introduction of the Roman breviary and missal in the diocese. The primatial church of Lyon adopted them for public services on 8 December 1869. One of the rites of the ancient Gallican liturgy, retained by the Church of Lyon, is the blessing of the people by the bishop at the moment of Communion.

=== The French Revolution ===
One of the first acts of the French Revolution was the abolition of feudalism and its institutions, including estates, provinces, duchies, baillies, and other obsolete organs of government. The National Constituent Assembly ordered their replacement by political subdivisions called "departments", to be characterized by a single administrative city in the center of a compact area. The decree was passed on 22 December 1789, the boundaries fixed on 26 February 1790, with the institution to be effective on 4 March 1790. A metropolitanate called "Metropole du Sud-est" was established, which consisted of nine departments. Lyon was named the departmental capital of Rhône et Loire. The National Constituent Assembly then, on 6 February 1790, instructed its ecclesiastical committee to prepare a plan for the reorganization of the clergy. At the end of May, its work was presented as a draft Civil Constitution of the Clergy, which, after vigorous debate, was approved on 12 July 1790. There was to be one diocese in each department, requiring the suppression of approximately fifty dioceses, especially along the Rhône River. Both the establishment and the suppression of dioceses was a canonical matter, and was reserved to the pope, not to the National Constituent Assembly.

=== 19th century changes ===
The Concordat of 1801, agreed between Pope Pius VII and First Consul Napoleon Bonaparte, assigned as the boundaries of the Archdiocese of Lyon the Departments of the Rhône and Loire and the Ain, and as suffragans the Dioceses of Mende, Grenoble, and Chambéry. The Archdiocese of Lyon was authorized by Letters Apostolic of 29 November 1801, to unite with its title the titles of the suppressed metropolitan Sees of Vienne and Embrun. In addition, the dioceses of Belley and Mâcon, were suppressed on November 29, 1801 with all of Belley's and some of Mâcon's territory added to the Archdiocese of Lyon. The Diocese of Belley was restored on October 6, 1822, while the Archdiocese of Lyon's name was changed to Lyon-Vienne, with the title of Embrun passing to the Archbishop of Aix, and in 2008 from Aix to the Bishop of Gap.

=== 20th century ===
A new diocese of Saint-Étienne was erected on December 26, 1970, on territory on the left (west) bank of the Rhone, taken from the Archdiocese's territory. The name of the archdiocese's was simplified to "Lyon" on December 15, 2006. The title of Vienne was assigned instead to Lyon's suffragan, the diocese of Grenoble.

== Saints ==
The Diocese of Lyon honours as a saints Saint Epipodius and his companion Saint Alexander, probably martyrs under Marcus Aurelius; the priest Peregrine of Auxerre (3rd century) is also honoured.

At the end of the empire and during the Merovingian period several saints are counted among the Bishops of Lyon: Saint Justus (374–381) who died in a monastery in the Thebaid (Egypt) and was renowned for the orthodoxy of his doctrine in the struggle against Arianism; the church of the Maccabees, where his remains were brought, was a place of pilgrimage under the name of the church of Saint Justus, as early as the 5th century. Saint Alpinus and Saint Martin (disciple of Saint Martin of Tours; end of 4th century); Saint Antiochus (400–410); Saint Elpidius (410–422); Saint Sicarius (422–33).

Saint Baldonor (Galmier), a native of Aveizieux, at first a locksmith, whose piety was remarked by the bishop, Saint Viventiolus: he became a cleric at the Abbey of St. Justus, then subdeacon, and died about 760; the thermal resort of "Aquæ Segestæ", in whose church Viventiolus met him, has taken the name of Saint Galmier; Saint Viator (d. about 390), who followed the Bishop Saint Justus to the Thebaid; Saints Romanus and Lupicinus (5th century), natives of the Diocese of Lyon, who lived as solitaries within the present territory of the Diocese of Saint-Claude; Saint Consortia, d. about 578, who, according to a legend criticized by Louis-Sébastien Le Nain de Tillemont, was a daughter of Saint Eucherius; Saint Rambert, soldier and martyr in the 7th century, patron of the town of the same name. As soon as Thomas Becket, Archbishop of Canterbury, had been proclaimed Blessed (1173), his cult was instituted at Lyon.

Blessed Jean Pierre Néel, born in 1832 at Ste. Catherine sur Rivière, was martyred at Kay-Tcheou, China, in 1862.

== Bishops and Archbishops of Lyon ==
=== Bishops of Lyon ===
- Pothinus (attested 177)
- Irenaeus
- Zacharias (195 – after 202)
- Helios of Lyon
- Faustinus (3rd quarter of the 3rd century)
- Lucius Verus
- Julius
- Ptolémaeus
- Vocius (attested 314)
- Maximus (Maxime)
- Tétradius (Tetrade)
- Verissimus fl. 343
- Justus of Lyon (374–381)
- Alpinus of Lyon (c. 390–397)
- Martin (c. 397–400)
- Antiochus of Lyon (400–410)
- Elpidius of Lyon (410–422)
- Sicarius (422–433)
- Eucherius of Lyon (c. 433–450)
- Patiens of Lyon (456–498)
- Lupicinus of Lyon (491–494)
- Rusticus (494–501)
- Stephanus (501 – Before 515)
- Viventiolus (515–523)

=== Archbishops of Lyon ===
- Lupus (535–542)
- Licontius (Léonce)
- Sardot or Sacerdos (549–552)
- Nicetius or Nizier (552–73)
- Priscus of Lyon (573–588)
- Ætherius (588–603)
- Aredius (603–615)
- Viventius of Lyon
- Annemund or Chamond (c. 650)
- Genesius or Genes (660–679 or 680),
- Lambertus (c. 680–690),
- Leidrad (798–814)
  - Agobard, Chorbishop (808?–814)
- Agobard (814–834, 837–840)
  - Amalarius of Metz (834–837) administrator
- Amulo, (840–852)
- Remigius (852–875)
- Aurelianus (875–895)
- Alwala of Montdor (895–905)
- Bernardus (906–907)
- Austerius (906–c. 919)
- Remi (c. 916–922)
- Anscheric (before 926–927)
- Guy (928–949)
- Burchard II of Lyon (?–?)
- Amblard (c. 957–978)
- Burchard III of Lyon (978–1032)
- Odolric (1041–1046)
- Halinard (1046–1052)
- Geoffroy de Vergy (1054–1064)
- Humbert (1064–1076)

=== Archbishops of Lyon and Primates of the Gauls ===
==== From 1077 to 1389 ====
- 1077–1082 Gebuin
- 1081–1106 Hugh of Die
- 1107–1118 Jauceran (Gaucheran)
- 1118–1128 Humbaud
- 1128–1129 Renaud of Semur
- 1131–1139 Peter
- 1139–1142 Faucon de Bothéon
- 1142–1148 Amadeus (Amé)
- 1148–1153 Humbertus de Bagé
- 1153–1163 Hercules de Montboissier
- 1163–1164 Dreux (Drogon)
- 1164–1180 Guichard of Pontigny
- 1182–1193 Jean de Belles-mains (Bellème, Belmeis)
- 1193–1226 Renaud de Forez
- 1227–1234 Robert of Auvergne
- 1236 Radulfus de Pinis
- 1237–1245 Aimeric Guerry
- 1246–1267 Philippe de Savoy Administrator
- 1267–1272 Gui de Mello
- 1272–1273 Pierre de Tarentaise, O.P.
- 1273–1283 Ademar de Roussillon, O.S.B.
- 1289–1294 Bérard de Got

1290–1295 Louis of Anjou, O.F.M.

- 1295–1301 Henri de Villars
- 1301–1308 Louis de Villars
- 1308–1332 Peter of Savoy
- 1332–1340 Guillaume de Sure
- 1340–1342 Guy de Bologne
- 1342–1354 Henri II de Villars
- 1356–1358 Raymond Saquet
- 1358–1365 Guillaume II de Thurey
- 1365–1375 Charles d'Alençon
- 1375–1389 Jean II de Talaru

==== From 1389 to 1799 ====
- 1389–1415 Philippe de Thurey Avignon Obedience
- 1417–1444 Amédée de Talaru
- 1444–1446 Geoffroy II de Versailles
- 1447–1488 Charles II of Bourbon
- 1488–1499 Hugues II de Talaru
- 1499–1500 André d'Espinay (cardinal)
- 1501–1536 François de Rohan
- 1537–1539 John, Cardinal of Lorraine
- 1539–1551 Ippolito II d'Este Administrator
- 1551–1562 Cardinal François de Tournon
- 1562–1564 Ippolito II d'Este Administrator
- 1564–1573 Antoine d'Albon
- 1573–1599 Pierre d'Épinac
- 1612–1626 Denis-Simon de Marquemont
- 1626–1628 Charles Miron
- 1628–1653 Alphonse-Louis du Plessis de Richelieu
- 1653–1693 Camille de Neufville de Villeroy
- 1714–1731 François-Paul de Neufville de Villeroy
- 1732–1739 Charles-François de Châteauneuf de Rochebonne
- 1740–1758 Pierre Guérin de Tencin
- 1758–1788 Antoine de Malvin de Montazet
- 1788–1799 Yves-Alexandre de Marbeuf

==== Constitutional bishops ====
1791–1794 Antoine-Adrien Lamourette (1791–1794) constitutional bishop
1798–1801 Claude-François-Marie Primat

=== Primates of Gauls and Archbishop of Lyon-Vienne ===
- (Cardinal) Joseph Fesch (29 July 1802 – 13 May 1839)

(Cardinal) Joachim-Jean d'Isoard (1839)

- (Cardinal) Louis-Jacques-Maurice de Bonald (1839 –1870)
- Jacques-Marie Ginoulhiac (1870–1875)
- (Cardinal) Louis-Marie Caverot (20 April 1876 – 23 January 1887)
- (Cardinal) Joseph-Alfred Foulon (23 March 1887 – 23 January 1893)
- (Cardinal) Pierre-Hector Coullie (14 June 1893 – 11 September 1912)
- (Cardinal) Hector Sévin (2 December 1912 – 4 May 1916)
- (Cardinal) Louis-Joseph Maurin (1 December 1916 – 16 November 1936)
- (Cardinal) Pierre-Marie Gerlier (30 July 1937 – 17 January 1965)
- (Cardinal) Jean-Marie Villot (17 January 1965 – 7 April 1967)
- (Cardinal) Alexandre Renard (28 May 1967 – 29 October 1981)
- (Cardinal) Albert Decourtray (29 October 1981 – 16 September 1994)
- (Cardinal) Jean Marie Balland (27 May 1995 – 1 March 1998)
- (Cardinal) Louis-Marie Billé (10 July 1998 – 12 March 2002)
- (Cardinal) Philippe Barbarin (16 July 2002 – 6 March 2020)
- Olivier de Germay (20 December 2020 – present)

== See also ==
- Catholic Church in France
- History of Lyon

== Bibliography ==
=== Reference works ===
- Gams, Pius Bonifatius (1873). Series episcoporum Ecclesiae catholicae: quotquot innotuerunt a beato Petro apostolo. Ratisbon: Typis et Sumptibus Georgii Josephi Manz. (Use with caution; obsolete)
- Eubel, Conradus, ed. (1913). Hierarchia catholica, Tomus 1 (second ed.). Münster: Libreria Regensbergiana. (in Latin)
- Eubel, Conradus, ed. (1914). Hierarchia catholica, Tomus 2 (second ed.). Münster: Libreria Regensbergiana. (in Latin)
- Eubel, Conradus; Gulik, Guilelmus (1923). Hierarchia catholica, Tomus 3 (second ed.). Münster: Libreria Regensbergiana.
- Gauchat, Patritius (Patrice) (1935). Hierarchia catholica IV (1592–1667). Münster: Libraria Regensbergiana.
- Ritzler, Remigius; Sefrin, Pirminus (1952). Hierarchia catholica medii et recentis aevi V (1667–1730). Patavii: Messagero di S. Antonio.
- Ritzler, Remigius; Sefrin, Pirminus (1958). Hierarchia catholica medii et recentis aevi VI (1730–1799). Patavii: Messagero di S. Antonio.
- Ritzler, Remigius; Sefrin, Pirminus (1968). Hierarchia Catholica medii et recentioris aevi sive summorum pontificum, S. R. E. cardinalium, ecclesiarum antistitum series... A pontificatu Pii PP. VII (1800) usque ad pontificatum Gregorii PP. XVI (1846) (in Latin). Vol. VII. Monasterii: Libr. Regensburgiana.
- Remigius Ritzler; Pirminus Sefrin (1978). Hierarchia catholica Medii et recentioris aevi... A Pontificatu PII PP. IX (1846) usque ad Pontificatum Leonis PP. XIII (1903) (in Latin). Vol. VIII. Il Messaggero di S. Antonio.
- Pięta, Zenon (2002). Hierarchia catholica medii et recentioris aevi... A pontificatu Pii PP. X (1903) usque ad pontificatum Benedictii PP. XV (1922) (in Latin). Vol. IX. Padua: Messagero di San Antonio. ISBN 978-88-250-1000-8.
- Société bibliographique (France) (1907). L'épiscopat français depuis le Concordat jusqu'à la Séparation (1802-1905). Paris: Librairie des Saints-Pères. pp. 346–350.

=== Studies ===
- Berthod, Bernard; Boucher, Jacqueline; Galland, Bruno; Ladous, Regis (contributors) (2012). Archevêques de Lyon. (in French). Lyon: Éditions lyonnaises d'art et d'histoire, 2012.
- Brouchoud, Claudius (1865). Recherches sur l'enseignement public du droit à Lyon depuis la formation de la commune jusqu'à nos jours. (in French). Lyon: A. Brun, 1865.
- Cattin, François (1867). Mémoires pour servir à l'histoire ecclésiastique des diocèses de Lyon et de Belley depuis la constitution civile du clergé jusqu'au concordat. (in French). Lyon: P. N. Josserand, 1867.
- Duchesne, Louis (1907). Fastes épiscopaux de l'ancienne Gaule Vol. 1: Provinces du Sud-Est. (in French). 2nd edition. Paris: Albert Fontemoing 1907.
- Duchesne, Louis (1900). Fastes épiscopaux de l'ancienne Gaule, Volume 2: L'Aquitaine et les Lyonnaises. (in French). Paris: Fontemoing 1900.
- Fisquet, Honore (1864). La France pontificale (Gallia Christiana): Metropole de Lyon et Vienne: Lyon (in French). Paris: Etienne Repos.
- Gingins La Sarraz, Frédéric de (1852). Les trois Burchard: archevêques de Lyon au Xe et XIe siècles. (in French). Lyon: Aimé Vingtrinier, 1852.
- Guigue, Georges (1919). Les Bulles d'or de Frédéric Barberousse pour les archevêques de Lyon, 1152–1184. (in French and Latin). Paris: Imprimerie nationale, 1919.
- Lyonnet, Jean Baptiste (1841). Le Cardinal Fesch, Archevêque de Lyon. ... Fragments biographiques, politiques et religieux, pour servir à l'histoire ecclésiastique contemporaine, Volume 1. Volume 2. (in French). Lyon: Perisse Frères 1841.
- Piolin, Paulin (1876). Gallia christiana in provincias ecclesiasticas distributa. Tomus quartus, second edition, ed. P. Piolin (in Latin). Paris: V. Palmé, 1876.
- Pericaud, Antoine (1854). Notice sur François de Rohan, archevêque de Lyon et administrateur de l'église d'Angers. (in French). Lyon: A. Vingtrinier, 1854.
- Pisani, Paul (1907). Répertoire biographique de l'épiscopat constitutionnel (1791–1802) (in French). Paris: A. Picard et fils.
- Poullin de Lumina, Étienne Joseph (1770). Histoire de l'église de Lyon. (in French) Lyon: J.-L. Berthoud 1770.
- Vallet, Georges (1900). L'ancienne faculté de droit de Lyon: ses origines, son histoire. (in French). Lyon: Mougin Rousand Waltener, 1900.
