= Saint-Nizier Church =

Church in Presqu'île, Lyon, France

Église Saint-Nizier
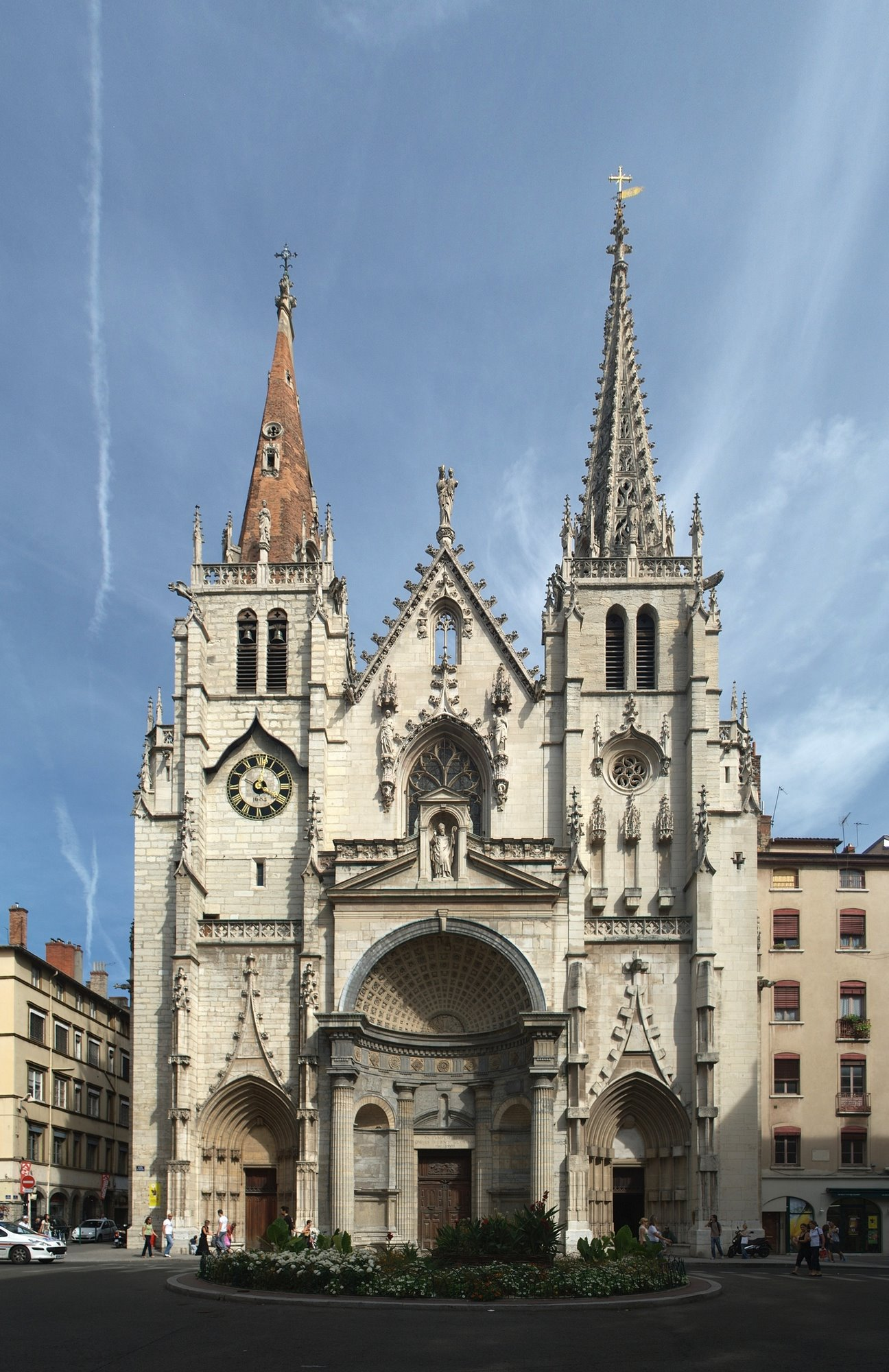
- Facade of the church

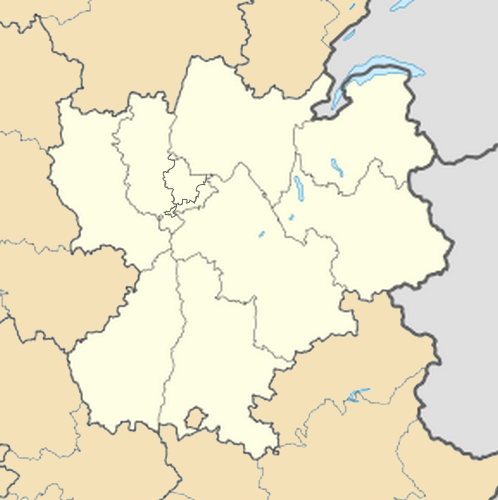
- Location within Rhône-Alpes Location within France

Religion
- Affiliation: Roman Catholic
- Diocese: 2nd arrondissement of Lyon
- Rite: Roman Rite
- Ecclesiastical or organisational status: Active
- Leadership: Emmanuel Community
- Patron: Nicetius

Location
- Location: Lyon, France
- Coordinates: 45.764711°N 4.833598°E

Architecture
- Type: Church
- Style: Gothic
- Completed: Late 16th century
- Spire: 2

Website
- saintnizier.fr

The façade ot the Church of Saint-Nizier (2024).

The Church of Saint-Nizier (French: Église Saint-Nizier) is a church in the Presqu'île district of Lyon, France, in the 2nd arrondissement, between the Place des Terreaux and the Place des Jacobins. Its name refers to Nicetius of Lyon, a bishop of the city during the 6th century. Begun in the 14th century and only completed in the 19th century, the church contains a variety of architectural styles, ranging from the neo-Gothic spire to the classical Renaissance facade. In 1998, it was inscribed on the UNESCO World Heritage List along with other historic buildings in Lyon.

== History ==
The first religious building on the site of the present church was a Roman monument, perhaps a temple of Attis, whose worship was probably the cause of the Christian persecution in Lyon from 177. In the 5th century, according to tradition, Eucherius of Lyon, 19th bishop of Lyon, built on the ruins of the building a basilica to contain the relics of the martyrs in Lyon, tortured in 177. The church received the name "Church of Holy Apostles". In the 6th century, the bishops were buried in the church, particularly Nicetius of Lyon, the 28th bishop. The body of the latter attracted a crowd and his presumed great miracles led the church to take his name.

Saint Austregisilus was abbot here during the 7th century.

In the early 8th century, the church has been ravaged by the Saracens and by Charles Martel. It was rebuilt in the 9th century, at the behest of the bishop Leidrade. Peter Waldo, in the 13th century, was a parishioner. His disciples, shocked by the wealth of the church, even set fire in 1253.

From the 14th century to the late 16th century, the church was gradually rebuilt. In 1562, the notables gathered in the church, and in the 17th century, the aldermen were elected in the nave. It suffered the damage caused by several bands of Huguenot, which plundered the bishops of Lyon's tombs, then those of the French Revolution.

After the French Revolution, the church served as flour warehouse. In the late 18th century, the project to transform the church into a gallery was abandoned after a petition signed by 100 notables.

The sacristy was built in 1816, and the organ was installed in 1886.

The church was in the 1970s the center of a popular neighborhood. Its presence was highlighted during its occupation by some prostitutes of the neighborhood in 1975 to express their anger towards police and social harassment. This church has often been perceived as a place of refuge and hospitality in the city.

In the beginning in 1968, renovations undertaken by the management of the monument historique and the city of Lyon began, and they ended in 1998.

== Architecture ==
The church is mainly built in the Gothic style with a Renaissance portal. Among its particularities are:

- a crypt
- Several side chapels
- The tomb of Pauline-Marie Jaricot
- Mosaics by Gaspard Poncet, representing the Virgin Mary and the 48 martyrs of Lyon
- A statue of the Virgin made by Antoine Coysevox
- A neogothic pulpit made after a design by Benoît
- The stale of the chapter of canons
- Stained glasses by Bégule, Gruber and Lavergne
- A 17th-century clock
- A plaque about the marriage of Frederic Ozanam

== Famous people ==
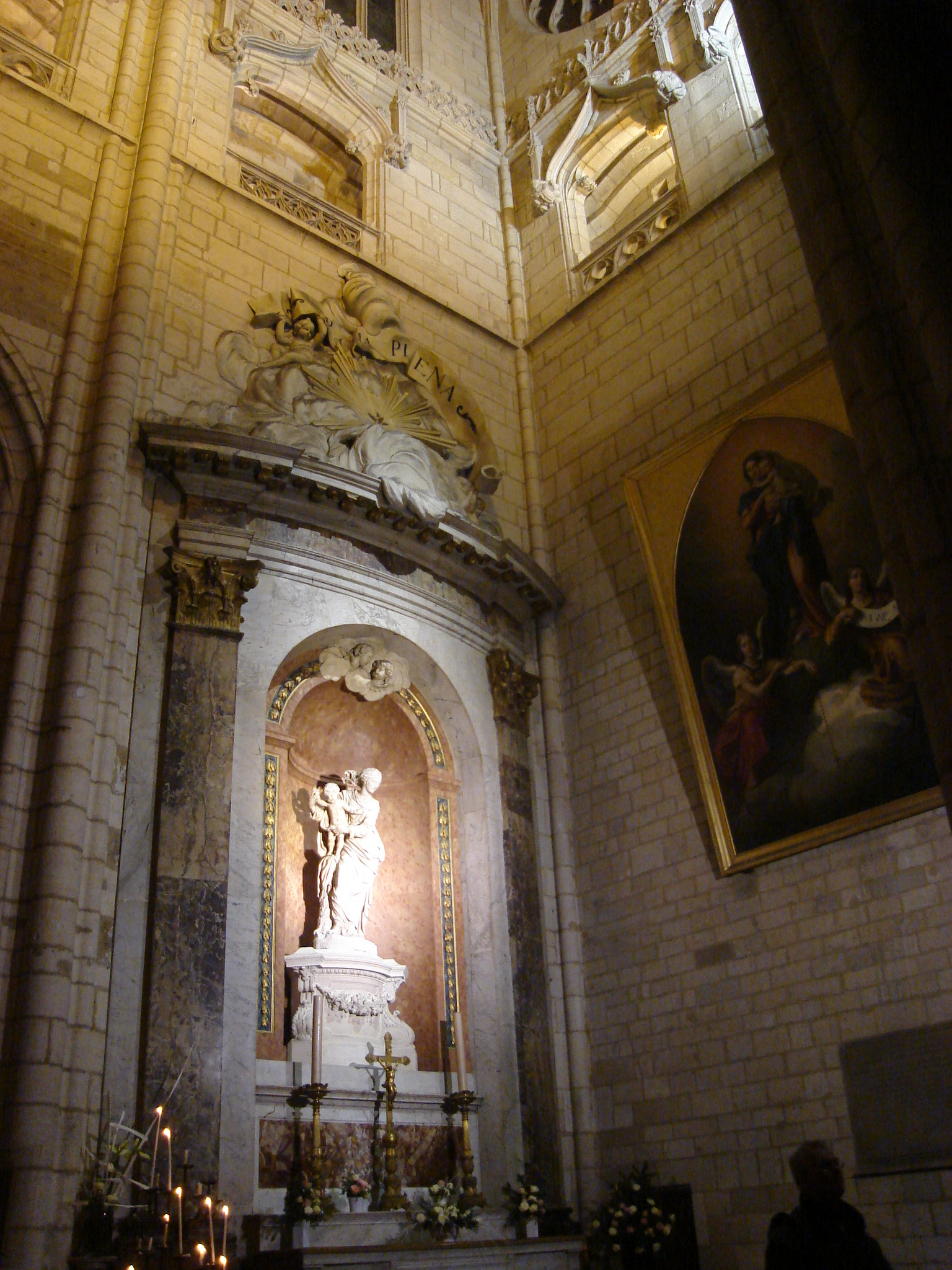
One of the side chapels

In the 17th century, theologian Bédien Morange was cantor and canon of Saint-Nizier. In the 19th century, the parish hosted famous spiritual people such as Frederic Ozanam, founder of the Saint-Vincent de Paul conferences, and Pauline-Marie Jaricot, foundress of the Propagation of the Faith. The church has been directed by priests and laity of the Emmanuel Community since 1996.
