= Henri de Villars (died 1354) =

French prelate (died 1354)

for Henri de Villars, Archbishop of Vienne, see Henri de Villars (died 1693)

Blazon de Villars family

Henri de Villars otherwise Henri de Thoire-Villars (died 1354) was a 14th-century French prelate, latterly archbishop of Lyon.

== Life ==
Henri was the son of Humbert V, sire of Thoire and Villars, and his wife Leonora de Beaujeu, and a nephew of Louis de Villars, Archbishop of Lyon.

He was a canon of the chapter in Lyon, later sacristan and chamarier (the superintendent of the archbishop's finances). In 1333 he was appointed Bishop of Viviers and in 1336 Bishop of Valence and Die. In 1342 he was elected Archbishop of Lyon.

On 28 April 1343, the Dauphin Humbert II appointed him vicar of the Dauphiné, of which he was the last governor before the sale of the principality to France in 1349.
