= Nicetius of Lyon =

Catholic saint and Archbishop of Lyon (d. 573)

Saint Nicetius of Lyon
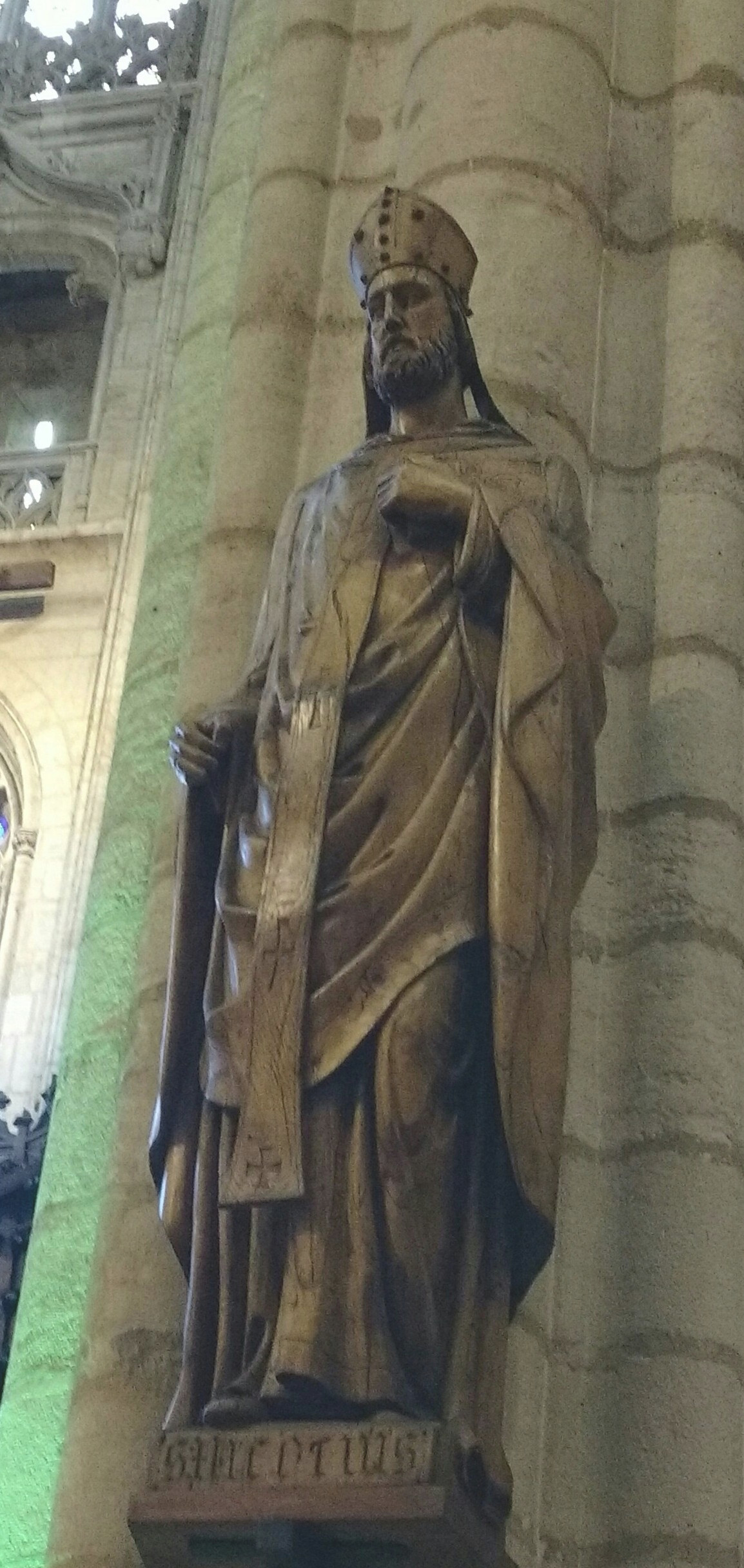
- Statue of Nicetius at Saint-Nizier Church

Bishop
- Born: 513
- Died: 2 April 573
- Venerated in: Catholic Church
- Feast: 2 April

Saint Nicetius (Nicetus, Nicet or Nizier) (513 – 2 April 573) was Archbishop of Lyon, then Lugdunum, France, during the 6th century. He served from 552 or 553. He is venerated as a saint in the Catholic Church.

== Life ==
Nicetius was descended from an ancient noble Gaulish family in Burgundy, and, by the care of virtuous parents, received a learned and pious education. He was ordained as a priest by Agricola of Chalon-sur-Saône. Nicetius was the nephew of Sacerdos, bishop of Lyon, and his successor. He revived ecclesiastical chant in his diocese.

Nicetius received the title of patriarch from the pope. He took it upon himself to judge secular as well as ecclesiastical cases and therefore came into conflict with the local count. Nicetius attended a council at his own city of Lyon some time between 567 and 570.

== Veneration ==
His feast day is 2 April, the day on which he died. Miracles were attributed to him after his death. The church of Saint-Nizier in Lyon is dedicated to him. There is an early life of Nicetius which can be found in Vita Nicetii Episcopi Lugdunensis, ed. B. Krusch, Monumenta Germaniae Historica Scriptores Rerum Merovingicarum III pp. 518–524 and is translated online here Gregory of Tours - who refers to Nicetius as his uncle- also wrote a supplementary life to him in his Vita Patrum.

Catholic Church titles
Preceded by Sacerdos	Archbishop of Lyon; 552–573	Succeeded by Priscus
