= Saint-Claude =

Saint-Claude or St. Claude can refer to:

== Saints ==
- Claudius of Besançon (c. 607–696 or 699), French abbot
- Claude La Colombière (1641–1682), French Jesuit priest

== Places ==
Canada

- St. Claude, Manitoba
- Saint-Claude, Quebec

France

- Arrondissement of Saint-Claude, Jura
- Avignon-lès-Saint-Claude, Jura
- Saint-Claude (Besançon), Doubs
- Saint-Claude, Guadeloupe
- Saint-Claude, Jura
- Saint-Claude-de-Diray, Loir-et-Cher

United States

- St. Claude, New Orleans, Louisiana, a neighborhood

== Other uses ==
- "Saint Claude" (song), by Christine and the Queens
- Roman Catholic Diocese of Saint-Claude
