= Condat Abbey =

Abbey in Bienne, modern-day France

Coordinates: 46°23′11″N 5°51′58″E

Condat Abbey was founded in the 420s in the valley of Bienne, in the Jura Mountains, in modern-day France. Condat became the capital of Haut Jura. The founders were local monks, Romanus (died c. 463), who had been ordained by St. Hilary of Arles in 444, and his younger brother Lupicinus of Lyon (Lupicin); the easily defended isolated site they chose for the separate cells in which they and their followers would live in emulation of the Eastern manner of the Desert Fathers was on a stony headland at the confluence of the rivers Bienne and Tacon. Though the site still contained Roman ruins, it was accounted a 'desert' in the Life of the Fathers of the Jura, which contains the early saints' lives. Romanus continued founding other abbeys, such as Romainmôtier Abbey at Romainmôtier-Envy, which retains his name. Not far away at La Balme, Yole, the sister of Romanus and Lupicinus, founded her nunnery.

The establishment at Condat developed into one of the pre-eminent monasteries of the Merovingian and Carolingian eras. The fourth abbot, Eugendus (Oyend, died c. 510–515), was educated in the monastery and never left it. As abbot he rebuilt it in stone and transformed its early eremitism to a coenobitic rule. Oyend increased the independence of the monastery and transformed it into an ecclesiastical principality that ruled all Upper Jura; nevertheless, the diplomas apparently from Charlemagne and confirming territorial rights were demonstrated by René Poupardin to be forgeries, apparently of the eleventh century. After the time of Oyend, the monastery at Condat and the village that developed around its protective walls were known as Saint-Oyend-de-Joux. From Oyend's abbey and from Lérins Sigismund of Burgundy, newly converted from Arianism, drew monks for the refounded house (St. Maurice's Abbey) that he established at Agaunum, c. 515–522. Many further abbots of Condat were canonised, as well as several monks of the sixth and seventh centuries.

The abbey library and school educated Leutfridus (Leufroy, died 738) himself a founder of a Benedictine abbey, Romanus, Archbishop of Reims, and Viventiolus, Archbishop of Lyon. Carloman, uncle of Charlemagne, retired to Condat, where the Benedictine rule was established in 814. A monk of Condat, Manon, having enriched the library of Condat with manuscripts, was appointed by Charles the Bald, about 874, to head the Palace school: among his pupils there was Radboud, Bishop of Utrecht.

In the tenth century Stephen of Beze (died 1116) increased the abbey's reputation. Before he became a monk of Condat, Simon of Crépy, of the Carolingian royal house, was raised by Matilda, wife of William the Norman, was made count of Valois and Vexin, and fought Philip I of France.

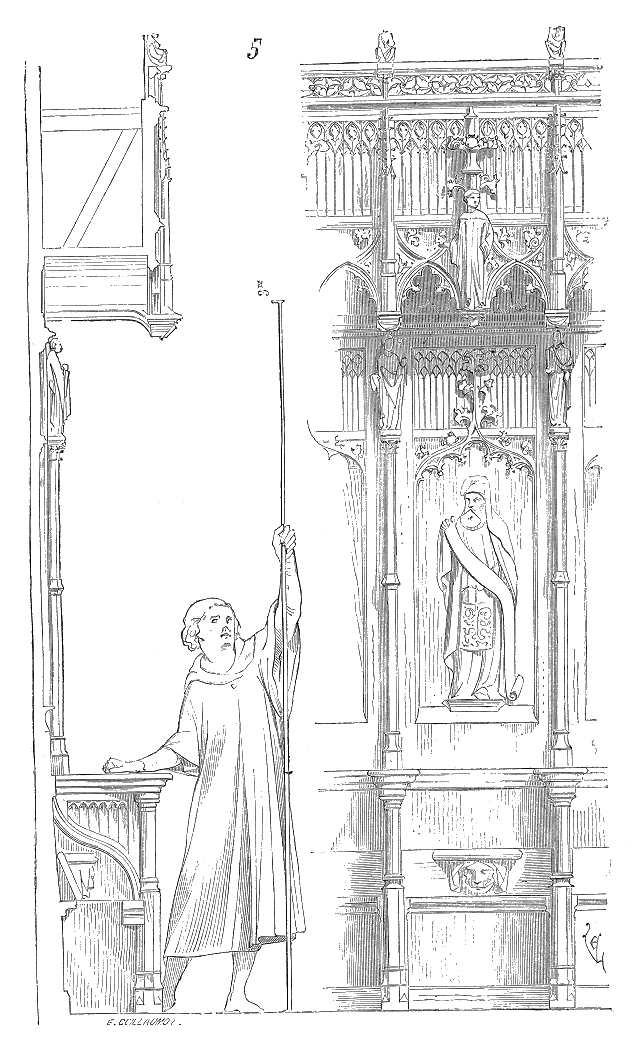
The choirstalls, illustrated by Eugène Viollet-le-Duc, 1856

Condat Abbey was a member of the Holy Roman Empire, held directly from the Emperor and independent of the Count of Burgundy. By the late twelfth century it possessed thirty-four priories, 108 churches and twenty-seven chapels.

Its famed collection of relics of the local saints drew pilgrims. In the twelfth century the body of the twelfth abbot, Claudius of Besançon (Claude, died 699), was exhumed intact and proclaimed a miraculous relic with curative powers. The cultus of Saint Claude that soon developed, extended to the pious king, Louis XI.

== Decline ==
The village began to take on its modern name of Saint-Claude in the seventeenth century, while the abbey declined. Its lethargic and luxurious style of life was subjected to a vigorous programme of reform by abbot Étienne de Fauquier (elected 1445), under a bull of Pope Nicholas V (1447); the regenerated abbey received confirmation of its exemption from the jurisdiction of the archbishop of Lyon from Calixtus III (1455), and the great carved Late Gothic choirstalls testify to the financial strength and confidence of the mid-fifteenth century abbey. However, under a series of abbots in commendam the abbey devolved into an aristocratic chapter, to join which a novice had to demonstrate four degrees of nobility. Three famous later abbots in commendam were Pierre de la Baume (abbot 1510–44), Don Juan of Austria the Younger, natural son of Philip IV of Spain (abbot 1645–79) and César Cardinal d'Estrées (1681–1714). Its lands were finally secularised in 1742, and the bishopric of Saint-Claude established to care for its former parishes. Today all that remains of the abbey of Condat is its former abbey church, rebuilt in the fourteenth century and often further remodelled, as Saint-Claude Cathedral.

The most comprehensive history of the abbey is Dom P. Benoît, Histoire de l'abbaye et de la terre de Saint-Claude (Montreuil-sur-Mer) 2 vols. 1890–92 (re-edited 1990).

== List of Abbotts ==
- Roman, abbot from 430 to 473.
- Lupicien, abbot from 473 to 493.
- Minause, provost or dean of Condat, abbot from 493 to 496.
- Saint Oyand, abbot from 496 to 510.
- Antidiole, abbot from 510 to 533.
- Olympus, abbot from 533 to 566.
- Sapient, abbot from 566 to 588.
- Thalaise, abbot from 588 to 603.
- Daguemond, abbot from 603 to 627.
- Audéric, abbot from 627 to 649.
- Injurious, abbot from 649 to 674.
- Saint Claude, abbot from 681 to 696.
- Rustic, abbot from 697 to 731.
- Aufred, abbot from 731 to 739.
- Hippolytus, abbot from 739 to 769.
- Ricbert, abbot from 782 to 793.
- Vulfred, abbot from 793 to 794.
- Bertrade, abbot from 794 to 804.
- Antelme, abbot from 804 to 814.
- Achin, abbot from 814 to?.
- Richin, abbot of? at 832.
- Angilmard Agilmar / Aguilmar, abbot from 832 to 850, then archbishop of Vienna.
- Remi, abbot from 850 to 875.
- Aurélien, abbé de 875 à 894.
- Ildebert, abbot from 894 to 895.
- Vulfred II, abbot from 895 to 896.
- Bertrand, abbot from 896 to 898.
- Bernard, abbot from 898 to 899.
- Bertalde, abbot from 899 to 921.
- Gipéric, abbot from 921 to 948.
- Guy, abbot from 948 to 952.
- Bozon, abbot from 952 to 972.
- Achinard, abbot from 972 to 986.
- Norbald, abbot from 986 to 1002.
- Gausserand, abbot from 1015 to 1026.
- Odéric, abbot from 1026 to 1038.
- Leutalde, abbot from 1038 to 1054.
- Jodstalde, abbot from 1054 to 1073.
- Odon I, abbot from 1073 to 1084.
- Hunald I, abbot from 1084 to 1093.
- Humbert I, abbot from 1100 to 1106.
- Hulnaud, abbot from 1106 to 1112.
- Adon I, abbot from 1112 to 1146.
- Humbert II, abbot from 1146 to 1147.
- Gerard I, abbot from 1147 to 1148.
- Adon II, abbot from 1148 to 1154.
- Ponce de Thoire, before 1162, then Bishop of Belley.
- Aymon, abbot from 1175 to 1183.
- William I, abbot from 1183 to 1186.
- Bernard II, abbot from 1186 to 1200.
- Bernard III of Thoire, abbot from 1200 to 1230.
- Hugh I of Nancuise, abbot from 1230 to 1234.
- Humbert III of Buenco, abbot from 1234 to 1252.
- Guy II, abbot from 1252 to 1256.
- Humbert IV, abbot from 1256 to 1260.
- Guy III, abbot from 1260 to 1262.
- Humbert V, abbot in 1262.
- Guy IV, abbot from 1262 to 1283.
- William II of Thoire-Villars, abbot from 1283 to 1284.
- Guy V, abbot from 1284 to 1285.
- Humbert VI, abbot from 1285 to 1293.
- William III of La Baume, abbot from 1293 to 1298.
- Étienne I de Saint-Cergues, abbott 1298 to 1303.
- Geoffroy, abbot from 1303 to 1304.
- Odon II of Vaudrey, abbot from 1304 to 1314.
- Stephen II, abbot from 1314 to 1317.
- Odon III of Vaudrey, abbot from 1317 to 1320.
- Francis I, abbot in 1320.
- John I, abbot from 1320 to 1326.
- Hugh II, abbot in 1326.
- John II of Roussillon, abbot from 1326 to 1348.
- William IV of Beauregard, abbot from 1348 to 1380.
- Guy VI, abbot from 1380 to 1384.
- William V of the Baume, abbot from 1384 to 1393.
- William VI, abbot from 1393 to 1404.
- Francis II, abbot from 1404 to 1420.
- Stephen III, abbot from 1420 to 1426.
- Francis III, abbot from 1426 to 1429.
- John III, abbot from 1429 to 1438.
- Guy VII d'Usier, abbot from 1438 to 1441.
- Pierre Morrelly, abbot from 1441 to 1444.
- Étienne Fauquier, abbot from 1444 to 1466.
- Augustin of East Lugnano, abbot from 1466 to 1467.
- Jean Louis de Savoie, abbot from 1469 to 1483.
- Pierre II Morelly, abbot in 1483.
- Pierre III de Viry, abbot from 1483 to 1500.
- Pierre IV Morelly, abbot from 1500 to 1510.
- Pierre V de la Baume, abbot from 1510 to 1544.
- Claude de la Baume, abbot from 1545 to 1546.
- Louis de Rye, abbot from 1546 to 1549.
- Philibert de Rye, abbot from 1550 to 1561.
- Marc de Rye, abbot from 1561 to 1580.
- Joachim de Rye, abbot from 1580 to 1588.
- Ferdinand de Rye, abbot from 1589 to 1636.
- Juan José of Austria, abbot from 1638 to 1679.
- César d'Estrées, abbot from 1680 to 1712.
- John de Estrée, abbot from 1712 to 1718.
- Louis de Bourbon-Condé, abbot from 1718 to 1742.
