= Romanus of Condat =

Christian saint, monk and hermit (390–460)

Saint Romanus of Condat
- Stained glass windo in Pléchâtel, Brittany depicting Romanus of Condat and his brother Lupicinus
- Born: c. AD 390; Upper Bugey, France
- Died: c. AD 460
- Venerated in: Roman Catholic Church; Eastern Orthodox Church
- Feast: 28 or 29 February
- Patronage: drowning victims, the insane, mental illness, mentally ill people

Romanus of Condat (also known in English as Saint Roman; French: Romain de Condat or Romain du Jura; c. AD 390 – c. 463) is a Christian saint of the fifth century AD. At the age of thirty five, he decided to live as a hermit in the area of Condat. His younger brother Lupicinus followed him there. They became leaders of a community of monks that included Eugendus.

Romanus and Lupicinus founded several monasteries. These included Condat Abbey, which was the nucleus of the later town of Saint-Claude, Jura), Lauconne (later Saint-Lupicin, as Lupicinus was buried there), La Balme (Beaume) (later Saint-Romain-de-Roche), where Romanus was buried, and Romainmôtier (Romanum monasterium), now in the canton of Vaud in Switzerland.

Romanus was ordained a priest by Hilary of Arles in 444.

His feast day is 28 February; in some calendars, it is moved to 29 February in leap years.

== Sources on Romanus ==
Two lives of him are in existence: one by Gregory of Tours in the Liber vitae patrum (Mon. Germ. Hist.: Script. Merov., I, 663), and an anonymous Vita Sanctorum Romani, Lupicini, Eugendi [ibid., III, 131 sqq.; cf. Benoît, "Histoire de St-Claude", I (Paris, 1890); Besson, "Recherches sur les origines des évêchés de Genève, Lausanne, et Sion" (Fribourg, 1906), 210 sqq.].
