= Lupicinus of Condat =

Lupicinus of Condat (c. 486), also known as Saint Lupicinus, Lupicin of Lauconne or Lupicin of Jura, was an abbot. His brother was Romanus of Condat. Lupicinus is noted for founding abbeys at Saint-Claude in the Jura Mountains (later known as Condat Abbey) and in Lauconne (now Saint-Lupicin, where he was buried) of France. His feast day is March 21.

Lupicinus is not to be confused with Lupicinus of Lipidiaco (Gaul) (died 500), who is also venerated as a saint.
