= Vita patrum Iurensium =

6th-century Latin work

The Vita patrum Iurensium ("Life of the Jura Fathers") is an anonymous Latin biographical trilogy composed around 520. It is a hagiographical work describing the lives of Romanus, Lupicinus and Eugendus, the founding abbots of the Jura Mountain monasteries of Condat, Saint-Lupicin and Romainmôtier, respectively. They lived in the late 5th and early 6th centuries and were influenced by the monasticism of Lérins. Although the authenticity of the Vita was once doubted, it is now completely accepted and is regarded as one of the best biographies of its time.

In his own words, the author of the Vita, who knew Eugendus personally, aimed to "reproduce faithfully...—according to what I saw there with my own eyes or received from the tradition of the elders—the deeds, the way of life and the rule of the esteemed fathers of the Jura Mountains". He refers to himself as "the trinal narrator of the life of the three abbots", indicating clearly that the singular vita (life, not vitae, lives) is intentional. Gérard Moyse and Ian Wood have ventured that the anonymous author was Viventiolus, a priest at Condat before he became bishop of Lyon. He dedicated the work to John and Armentarius, monks of Acaunus. He says that Marinus, abbot of Lérins, had requested a copy of the Institutes he wrote for the community of Acaunus.

The Latinity of the Vita is cumbersome but not uneducated. The author had access to Jerome's biography of Paul of Thebes, the Dialogues of Sulpicius Severus and the biographies of Anthony the Great and Martin of Tours. He knew, perhaps indirectly or through anthologies, the works of Basil the Great, John Cassian and Pachomius the Great. It is possible that he knew Greek, which may still have been taught at Lérins. His preference is for mystical interpretations of scripture.

Gregory of Tours, writing about sixty years after the Vita was composed, wrote the only other early biographies of the Jura Fathers in his Vita patrum. It does not appear that he had access to the earlier Vita, or else only to an epitome of it.

== Editions ==
- Martine, François, ed. (2004) [1968]. Vie des Pères du Jura. Paris: Les Éditions du Cerf.
- Sánchez Salor, Eustaquio, ed. (2014). Vida de los Padres del Jura: edición crítica y traducción. Madrid: Consejo superior de investigaciones científicas.
- Vivian, Tim; Vivian, Kim; Russell, Jeffrey Burton, eds. (1999). The Life of the Jura Fathers: The Life and Rule of the Holy Fathers Romanus, Lupicinus, and Eugendus, Abbots of the Monasteries in the Jura Mountains. Kalamazoo: Cistercian Publications.

== Bibliography ==
- Berschin, Walter (2006). "Vita patrum Iurensium". Brill's New Pauly. doi:10.1163/1574-9347_bnp_e12205880.
- Diem, Albrecht (2020). "Vita Vel Regula: Multifunctional Hagiography in the Early Middle Ages". In Samantha Kahn Herrick (ed.). Hagiography and the History of Latin Christendom, 500–1500. Leiden: Brill. pp. 123–142.
- Duchesne, Louis (1898). "La vie des Pères du Jura". Mélanges de l'École française de Rome. 18: 3–16.
- Vivian, Tim; Vivian, Kim; Russell, Jeffrey Burton (1999). "Introduction". The Life of the Jura Fathers: The Life and Rule of the Holy Fathers Romanus, Lupicinus, and Eugendus, Abbots of the Monasteries in the Jura Mountains. Kalamazoo: Cistercian Publications. pp. 27–93.
