= Butz-Choquin =

French pipe maker

Butz-Choquin is a French pipe maker. It was founded in 1858 by tobacconists Jean-Baptiste Choquin and Gustave Butz.

== History ==
The company was established in Metz; it remained there until 1951, when it was purchased by the Berrod-Regad company. It was then relocated to Saint-Claude, Jura. The company began to export pipes in 1960, receiving the Oscar of Export and the Gold Cup of the French Good Taste. The company was acquired by Denis Blanc in 2006.

== Pipes ==
Butz-Choquin's first pipe, the Choquin pipe, was a curved pipe with a flat-bottomed hearth, albatross bone, and silver rings. The company currently produces over 70 different series of pipes. Butz-Choquin pipes have only been readily available in the United States of America since 1999.
