= Imperial Chancellor =

Imperial Chancellor may refer to:

- Chancellor (China)
- Archchancellor (Holy Roman Empire)
- Imperial Chancellor (Germany)
