= Eugendus =

Saint Eugendus
- Born: c. 449; Izernore, France
- Died: January 1, 510
- Venerated in: Catholic Church Eastern Orthodox Church
- Feast: 4 January (formerly January 2) 1 January in Eastern Orthodox Church

Eugendus (also Augendus; French: Oyand, Oyan; c. 449 – January 1, 510) was the fourth abbot of Condat Abbey, at Saint-Claude, Jura.

== Life ==
Eugendus was born at Izernore. He was instructed in reading and writing by his father, who had become a priest, and at the age of seven was entrusted to Romanus and Lupicinus to be educated at Condat Abbey. Thenceforth he never left the monastery. Eugendus acquired much learning, read the Greek and Latin authors, and was well versed in the Scriptures. He led a life of great austerity, but out of humility did not wish to be ordained priest.

Abbot Minausius made him his coadjutor, and after the former's death (about 496) Eugendus became his successor. After the monastery, which Romanus had built of wood, was destroyed by fire, Eugendus erected another of stone, and improved the community life; thus far the brethren had lived in separate cells after the fashion of the Eastern ascetics. As abbot he transformed its early eremitism to a coenobitic rule. Eugendus played a key role in the development of pre-Benedictine monasticism in Gaul, and was influenced by early monastic rules (including the rule of John Cassian).

Eugendus increased the independence of the monastery and transformed it into an ecclesiastical principality that ruled all Upper Jura. He built an abbey church in honour of the Apostles Peter, Paul, and Andrew, and enriched it with precious relics; the church was the predecessor of the rebuilt abbey church that is now Saint-Claude Cathedral.

The order, which had been founded on the rules of the Oriental monasteries, now took on more of the active character of the Western brethren. Condat began to flourish as a place of refuge for all those who suffered from the misfortunes and afflictions of those eventful times. When Eugendus felt his end approaching he had his breast anointed by a priest according to the custom, took leave of his brethren, and died quietly after five days, at the age of sixty-one.

== Veneration ==
A few years after his death, his successor, Viventiolus, erected a shrine over his tomb in the abbey church, to which numerous pilgrims travelled. The village that grew round Condat Abbey came to be called, after Eugendus, Saint-Oyand de Joux, a name it retained as late as the sixteenth and seventeenth centuries, while the abbey's former name of Condat passed into oblivion. (However, Claudius of Besançon, who had resigned in 687 as Bishop of Besançon to become twelfth abbot, died at the abbey in 696. His grave became such a popular centre of pilgrimage that by the thirteenth century, the use of the name "Saint-Claude" had become general, and eventually superseded that of Saint-Oyand, so that the place is now known as Saint-Claude and gave its name to the Diocese of Saint-Claude.)

Eugendus has a biography in the Vita patrum Jurensium.

The feast of Saint Eugendus was at first transferred to 2 January; in the dioceses of Besançon and Saint-Claude it is now celebrated on 4 January.
