= Villard-sur-Bienne =

- Part of Nanchez
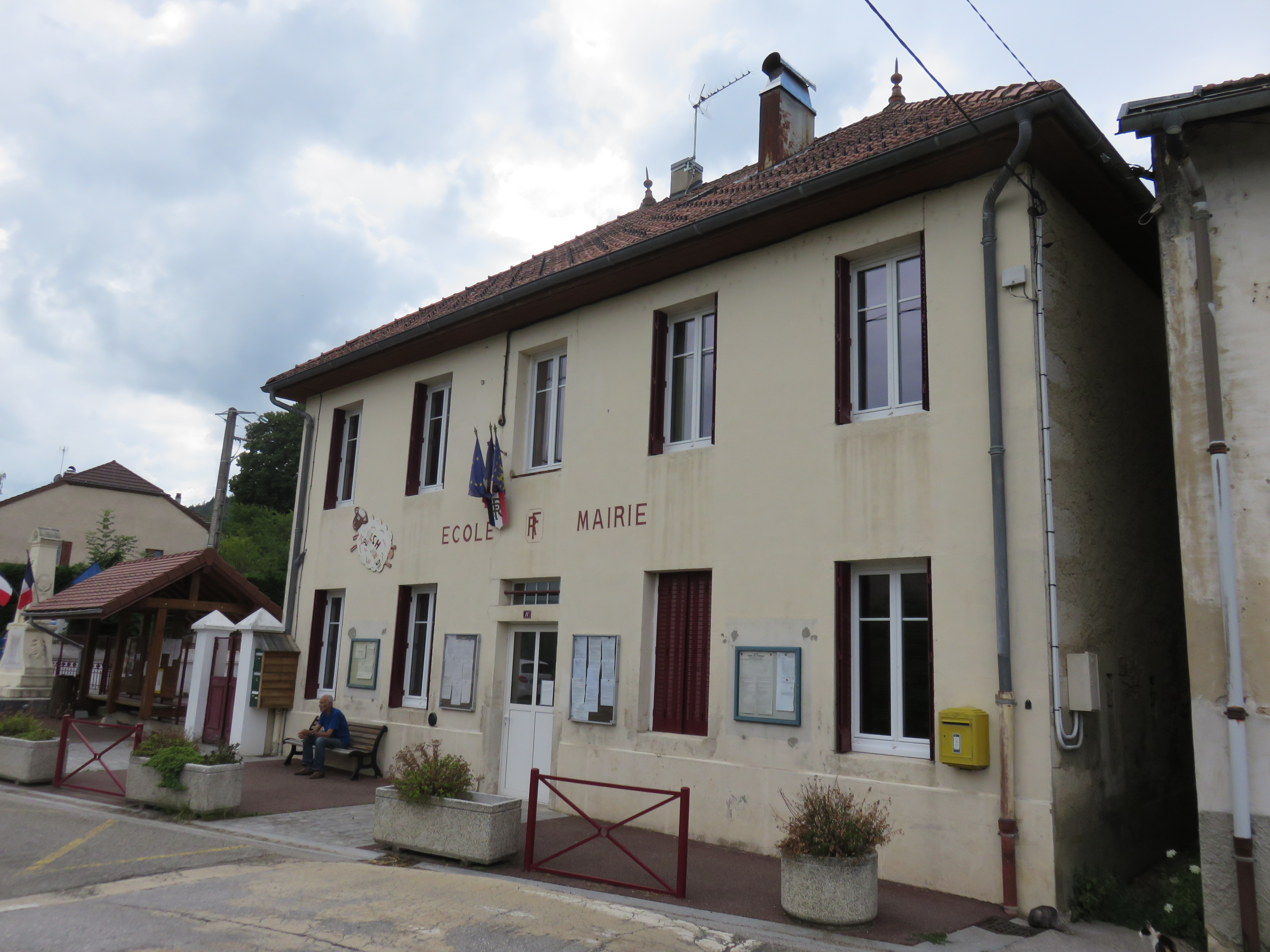
- The town hall in 2018.
- Location of Villard-sur-Bienne
- Location within France Location within Bourgogne-Franche-Comté
- Coordinates: 46°28′32″N 5°53′59″E
- Country: France
- Region: Bourgogne-Franche-Comté
- Department: Jura
- Arrondissement: Saint-Claude
- Canton: Saint-Claude
- Commune: Nanchez
- Area^{1}: 10.37 km^{2} (4.00 sq mi)
- Highest elevation: 962 m (3,156 ft)
- Lowest elevation: 485 m (1,591 ft)
- Population (2023): 164
  - Density: 15.8/km^{2} (41.0/sq mi)
- Time zone: UTC+01:00 (CET)
  - Summer (DST): UTC+02:00 (CEST)
- Postal code: 39200
- ^{1} French Land Register data, which excludes lakes, ponds, glaciers > 1 km^{2} (0.386 sq mi or 247 acres) and river estuaries.

Villard-sur-Bienne (French pronunciation: [vilaʁ syʁ bjɛn], literally Villard on Bienne) is a former commune in the Jura department in the Bourgogne-Franche-Comté region in eastern France. On 1 January 2019, it was merged into the commune Nanchez.

== See also ==
- Communes of the Jura department
