= Viventiolus =

Catholic saint and Archbishop of Lyon (d. 524)

Saint Viventiolus
- Archbishop of Lyon
- Archdiocese: Lyon
- Installed: 515
- Term ended: 523
- Predecessor: Stephanus
- Successor: Lupus

Personal details
- Born: 460
- Died: July 12, 524 (aged 63–64)
- Parents: Aquilinus (father), Tullia (grandmother)
- Profession: Author

Sainthood
- Feast day: July 12
- Venerated in: Catholic Church, Orthodox Church, True Orthodox Church

Saint Viventiolus (French: Saint Vivientol) (460 – July 12, 524) (also known as Juventiole) was the Archbishop of Lyon (ancient Lugdunum) 514–523. Later canonized and venerated as a saint within the Catholic Church, Archdiocese of Lyon, France his feast Day is July 12. He is recognised in the Orthodox Church and the True Orthodox Church, including amongst the Tikhonites, as a pre-Great Schism Western Saint.

== Family ==
Viventiolus and his brother Rusticus were the sons of Aquilinus (c. 430-c. 470), a nobleman of Lyon, and friend of Sidonius Apollinaris (c. 400). Aquilinus was a vicarius of a province in Gaul between 423 and 448 under Apollinaris, the father of Sidonius.

Through his paternal grandmother, Tullia, Viventiolus was the great-grandson of Saint Eucherius and his wife Gallia. His paternal grandfather was the son of Decimus Rusticus and his wife Artemia.

== Career ==
Viventiolus was a monk of St. Oyend (St. Claude), in Jura, where he was elected prior. Avitus of Vienne recommended him for the See of Lyon. In 517, he and Avitus presided over the Council of Epaone.

He is also the author of a book Life of the Jura Fathers, which described the beginnings of monasticism in that region.

Catholic Church titles
Preceded by Stephanus	Archbishop of Lyon; 515–523	Succeeded by Lupus
