= Saint-Claude Cathedral =

Cathedral in Saint-Claude, France

Coordinates: 46°23′11″N 5°51′59″E

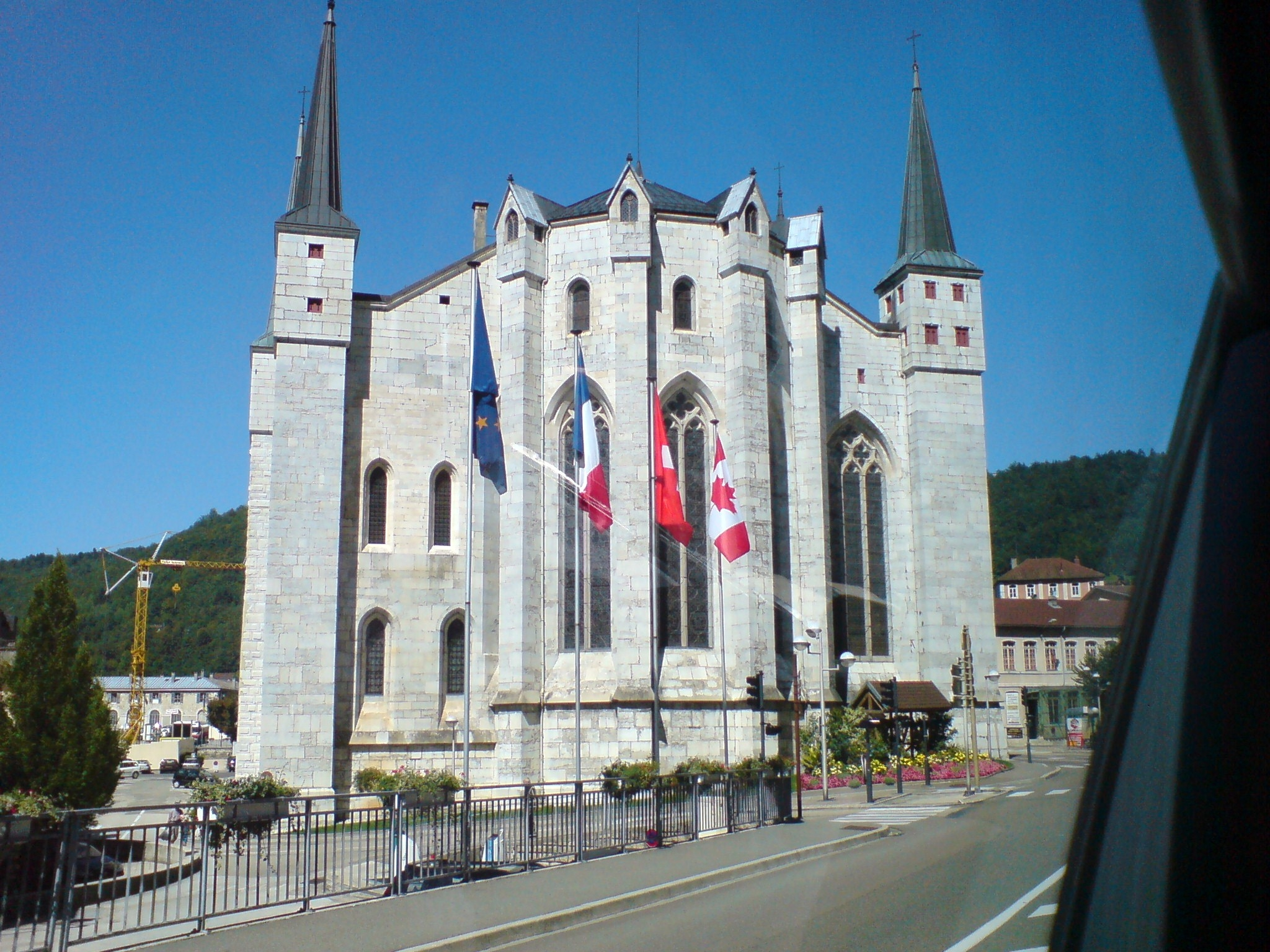
Saint-Claude Cathedral

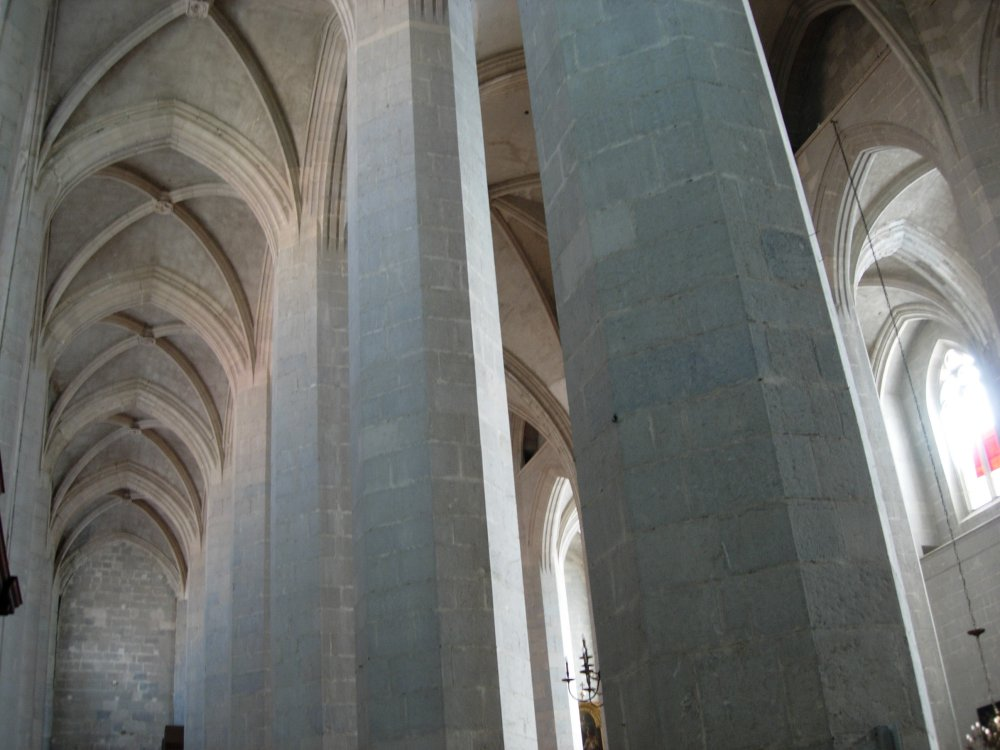
The nave of Saint-Claude Cathedral

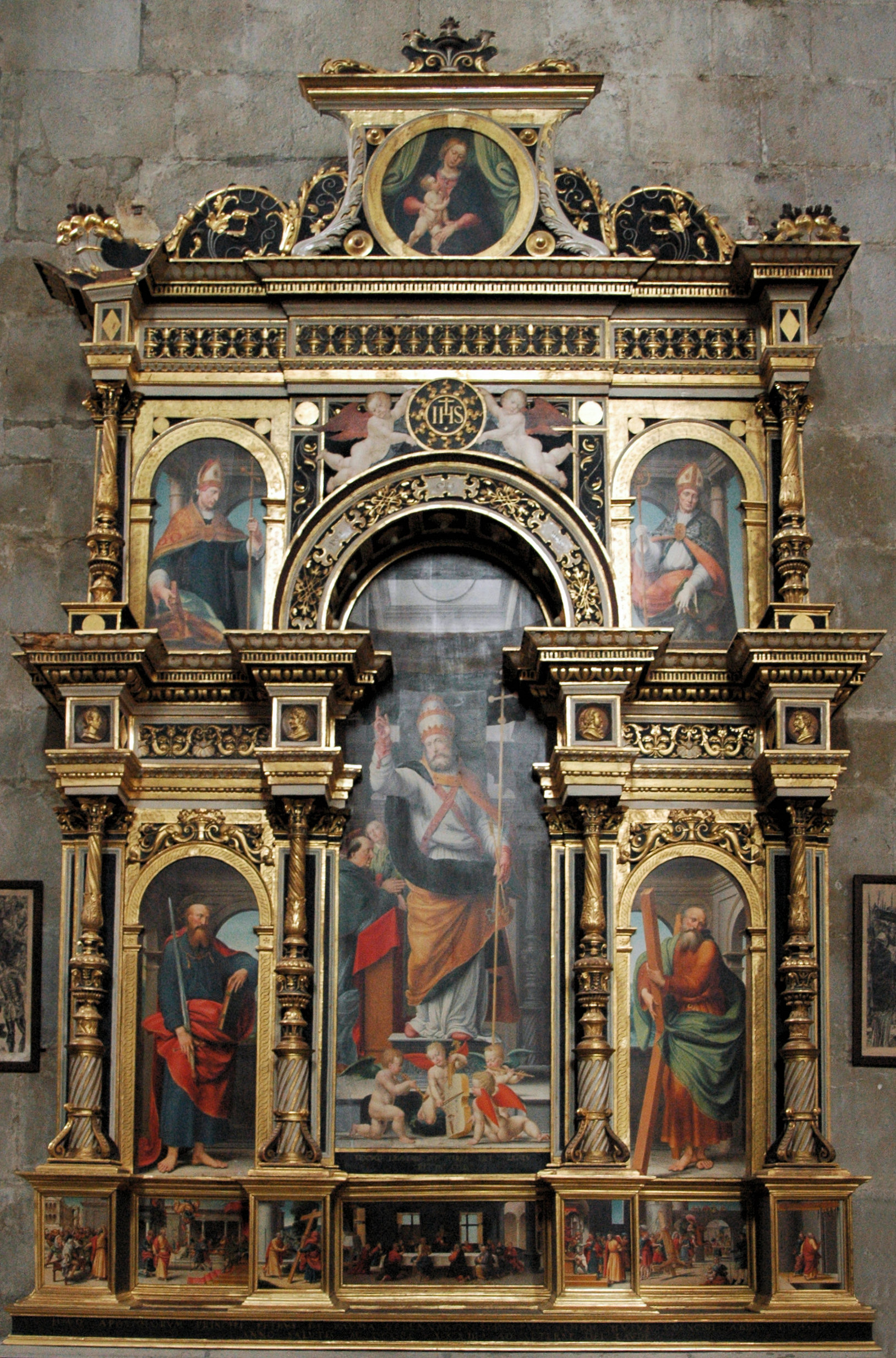
The so-called "Holbein Altar" (Autel d'Olbein) inside the cathedral

Saint-Claude Cathedral (French: Cathédrale Saint-Pierre, Saint-Paul et Saint-André de Saint-Claude) is a Roman Catholic cathedral dedicated to Saint Peter, Saint Paul and Saint Andrew, and a national monument of France, located in the town of Saint-Claude.

The present cathedral was previously the church of the former Condat Abbey (founded in the 5th century), which with the village that grew up round it soon acquired the name of Saint-Oyand or Saint-Oyend after Saint Eugendus (d. 510), fourth abbot and a popular saint. In 687 Saint Claudius resigned as Bishop of Besançon and became the twelfth abbot. After he died, in 696, his grave became a very popular pilgrimage centre, to the extent that by the thirteenth century, the name "Saint-Claude" had become more used than that of "Saint-Oyand", which it superseded.

The Bishopric of Saint-Claude was created in 1742, out of the parishes in the care of the abbey. The abbey church, built in the 15th century, became the cathedral.

== Burials ==
- Saint Ribert, abbot of Condat Abbey

== Sources and external links ==
- Location of the cathedral
- Photo of the cathedral
- Catholic Hierarchy: Diocese of Saint-Claude
- Catholic Encyclopedia: Saint-Claude
