= Gilbert-Antoine Duchêne =

Catholic bishop (1919–2009)

- Bishop of Diocese of Saint-Claude (Emeritus)
- Church: Roman Catholic Church
- See: Diocese of Saint-Claude
- In office: 1975 - 1994
- Predecessor: Claude-Constant-Marie Flusin
- Successor: Yves François Patenôtre
- Previous post: Bishop

Orders
- Ordination: 14 July 1946

Personal details
- Born: 29 July 1919 Moussey, France
- Died: 29 November 2009 (aged 90)

Gilbert-Antoine Duchêne (29 July 1919 – 29 November 2009) was a French bishop of the Roman Catholic Church.

Duchênet was born in Moussey, France and was ordained a priest on 14 July 1946. He was appointed Auxiliary bishop of the Diocese of Metz as well as Titular bishop of Tela on 18 September 1971 and ordained bishop on 11 December 1971. Duchênet was appointed Bishop of the Diocese of Saint-Claude on 10 June 1975 and retired from diocese on 1 December 1994.
