= Prénovel =

- Part of Nanchez
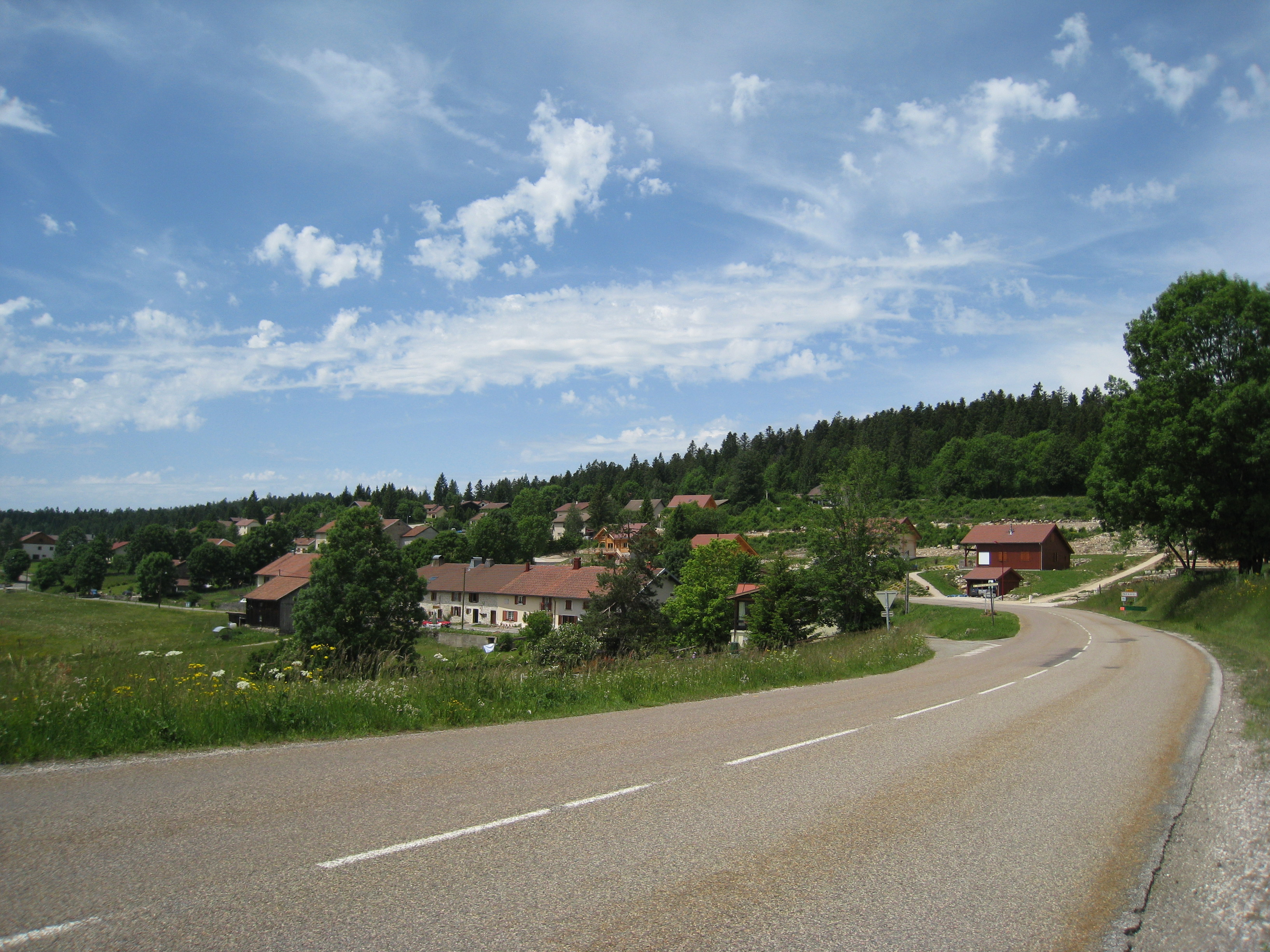
- Location of Prénovel
- Location within France Location within Bourgogne-Franche-Comté
- Coordinates: 46°30′45″N 5°50′25″E
- Country: France
- Region: Bourgogne-Franche-Comté
- Department: Jura
- Arrondissement: Saint-Claude
- Canton: Saint-Laurent-en-Grandvaux
- Commune: Nanchez
- Area^{1}: 8.20 km^{2} (3.17 sq mi)
- Highest elevation: 1,045 m (3,428 ft)
- Lowest elevation: 877 m (2,877 ft)
- Population (2023): 249
  - Density: 30.4/km^{2} (78.6/sq mi)
- Time zone: UTC+01:00 (CET)
  - Summer (DST): UTC+02:00 (CEST)
- Postal code: 39150
- ^{1} French Land Register data, which excludes lakes, ponds, glaciers > 1 km^{2} (0.386 sq mi or 247 acres) and river estuaries.

Prénovel (French pronunciation: [pʁenɔvɛl]) is a former commune in the Jura department in the Bourgogne-Franche-Comté region in eastern France. On 1 January 2016, it was merged into the new commune of Nanchez.

== See also ==
- Communes of the Jura department
