= Les Piards =

- Part of Nanchez
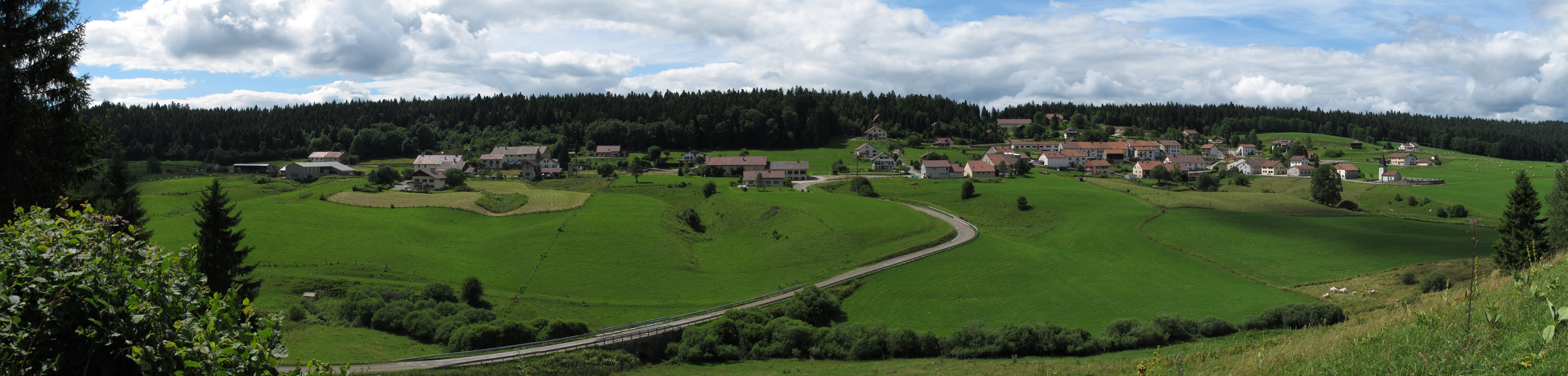
- Location of Les Piards
- Location within France Location within Bourgogne-Franche-Comté
- Coordinates: 46°29′47″N 5°49′46″E
- Country: France
- Region: Bourgogne-Franche-Comté
- Department: Jura
- Arrondissement: Saint-Claude
- Canton: Saint-Laurent-en-Grandvaux
- Commune: Nanchez
- Area^{1}: 5.29 km^{2} (2.04 sq mi)
- Highest elevation: 1,030 m (3,380 ft)
- Lowest elevation: 884 m (2,900 ft)
- Population (2023): 170
  - Density: 32/km^{2} (83/sq mi)
- Time zone: UTC+01:00 (CET)
  - Summer (DST): UTC+02:00 (CEST)
- Postal code: 39150
- ^{1} French Land Register data, which excludes lakes, ponds, glaciers > 1 km^{2} (0.386 sq mi or 247 acres) and river estuaries.

Les Piards (French pronunciation: [le pjaʁ]) is a former commune in the Jura department in Bourgogne-Franche-Comté in eastern France. On 1 January 2019, it was merged into the commune Nanchez.

== See also ==
- Communes of the Jura department
