= Council of Epaone =

The Council of Epaone or Synod of Epaone was held in September 517 at Epaone (or Epao, near the present Anneyron) in the Burgundian Kingdom.

It was one of three national councils of bishops held around that time in former Roman Gaul: the council of Agde was held in 506 in the Visigothic Kingdom in the south and the council of Orléans in 511 for the Kingdom of the Franks. The synod enacted the first legislation against wooden altars, forbidding the building of any but stone altars. It also witnessed to the rise of the practice of mitigation of canonical penance in view of the changing times and social conditions of Christians.

== Attendees ==
- St. Viventiolus (515–523), who presided
- St. Avitus, also presiding.
- St. Constantinus, bishop of Gap.
- Catulinus, bishop of Embrun.
- Laymen were also present and had a chance to question the morality of the local clergymen.

== Edicts passed ==
- Canon 12: forbade bishops from alienating ecclesiastical property without the permission of their metropolitan.
- Canon 15: Attendance at Jewish banquets prohibited.
- Canon 16: allowed baptized heretics to be admitted to the Church by a rite of unction (Presbyteros, . . . si conversionem subitam petant, chrismate subvenire permittimus). This was the practice also in the East, but in Rome and Italy admission was by laying on of hands.
- Canon 26: forbade the consecration of any but stone Altars.
- Clergy forbidden to hunt.
- Completely abrogated in the entire Kingdom the consecration of widows who are named Deaconesses.
- Canon 29 reduced to two years the penance that apostates were to undergo on their return to the Church, but obliged them to fast one day in three during those two years, to come to church and take their place at the penitents' door, and to leave with the catechumens. Any who objected to the new arrangement were to observe the much longer ancient penance.
