= Leschères =

Commune in Bourgogne-Franche-Comté, France

- Commune
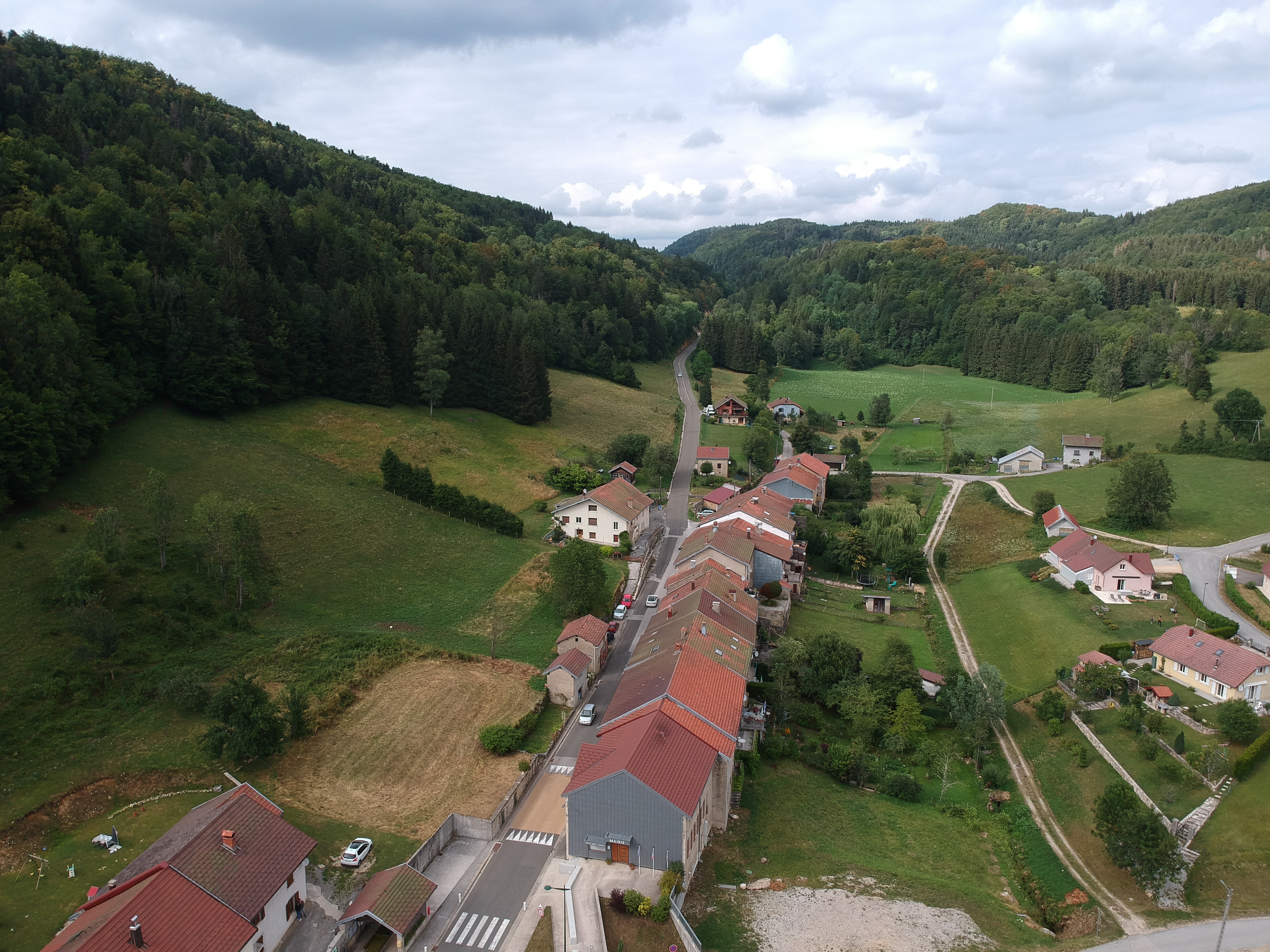
- Aerial view of Leschères in 2018
- Location of Leschères
- Location within France Location within Bourgogne-Franche-Comté
- Coordinates: 46°27′10″N 5°49′40″E
- Country: France
- Region: Bourgogne-Franche-Comté
- Department: Jura
- Arrondissement: Saint-Claude
- Canton: Saint-Claude
- Intercommunality: CC Haut-Jura Saint-Claude

Government
  - Mayor (2020–2026): Annie Mayet
- Area^{1}: 8.28 km^{2} (3.20 sq mi)
- Highest elevation: 1,064 m (3,491 ft)
- Lowest elevation: 700 m (2,300 ft)
- Population (2023): 192
  - Density: 23.2/km^{2} (60.1/sq mi)
- Time zone: UTC+01:00 (CET)
  - Summer (DST): UTC+02:00 (CEST)
- INSEE/Postal code: 39293 /39170
- ^{1} French Land Register data, which excludes lakes, ponds, glaciers > 1 km^{2} (0.386 sq mi or 247 acres) and river estuaries.

Leschères (French pronunciation: [leʃɛʁ]) is a commune in the Jura department in Bourgogne-Franche-Comté in eastern France.

== Population ==
Historical population
Year	Pop.	±% p.a.
1968	125	—
1975	113	−1.43%
1982	118	+0.62%
1990	121	+0.31%
1999	153	+2.64%
2007	219	+4.58%
2012	211	−0.74%
2017	209	−0.19%
2023	192	−1.40%
Source: INSEE

== Demonym ==
The inhabitants of the village are surprisingly known as Quilleux (meaning literally "skittle players"). The name owes its origin to the former existence of seven games of skittles in the village and its hamlets.

== Politics and administration ==
Period		Name	Party
March 2001	March 2014	Roger Béguet	
March 2014	current	Annie Mayet	DVD

== See also ==
- Communes of the Jura department
