= Chaux-des-Prés =

- Part of Nanchez
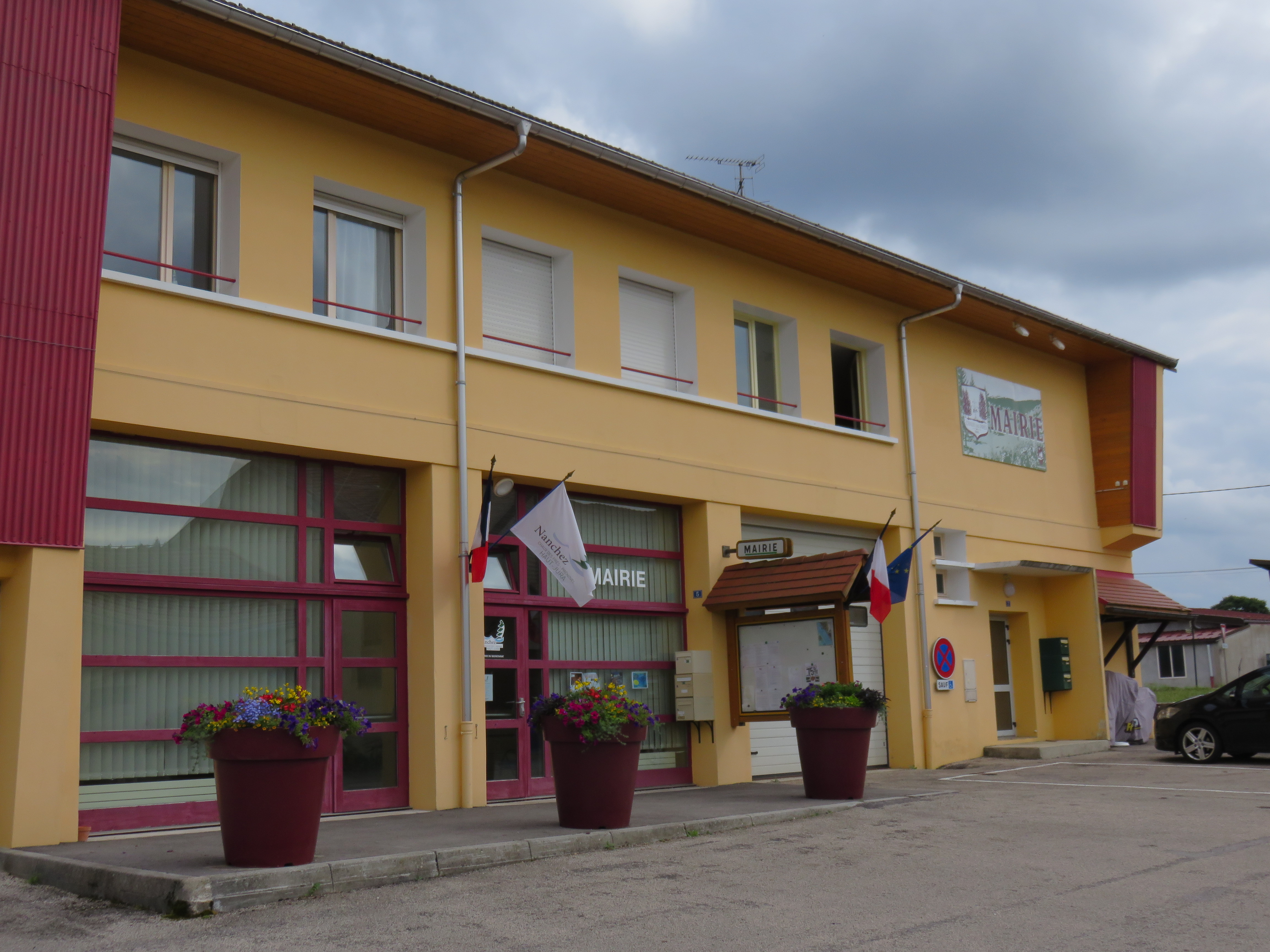
- Town hall
- Location of Chaux-des-Prés
- Location within France Location within Bourgogne-Franche-Comté
- Coordinates: 46°30′30″N 5°52′03″E
- Country: France
- Region: Bourgogne-Franche-Comté
- Department: Jura
- Arrondissement: Saint-Claude
- Canton: Saint-Laurent-en-Grandvaux
- Commune: Nanchez
- Area^{1}: 7.79 km^{2} (3.01 sq mi)
- Highest elevation: 1,003 m (3,291 ft)
- Lowest elevation: 834 m (2,736 ft)
- Population (2013): 180
  - Density: 23/km^{2} (60/sq mi)
- Time zone: UTC+01:00 (CET)
  - Summer (DST): UTC+02:00 (CEST)
- Postal code: 39150
- ^{1} French Land Register data, which excludes lakes, ponds, glaciers > 1 km^{2} (0.386 sq mi or 247 acres) and river estuaries.

Chaux-des-Prés (French pronunciation: [ʃo de pʁe]) is a former commune in the Jura department in the Bourgogne-Franche-Comté region in eastern France. On 1 January 2016, it was merged into the new commune of Nanchez.

== See also ==
- Communes of the Jura department
