= La Rixouse =

Commune in Bourgogne-Franche-Comté, France

- Commune
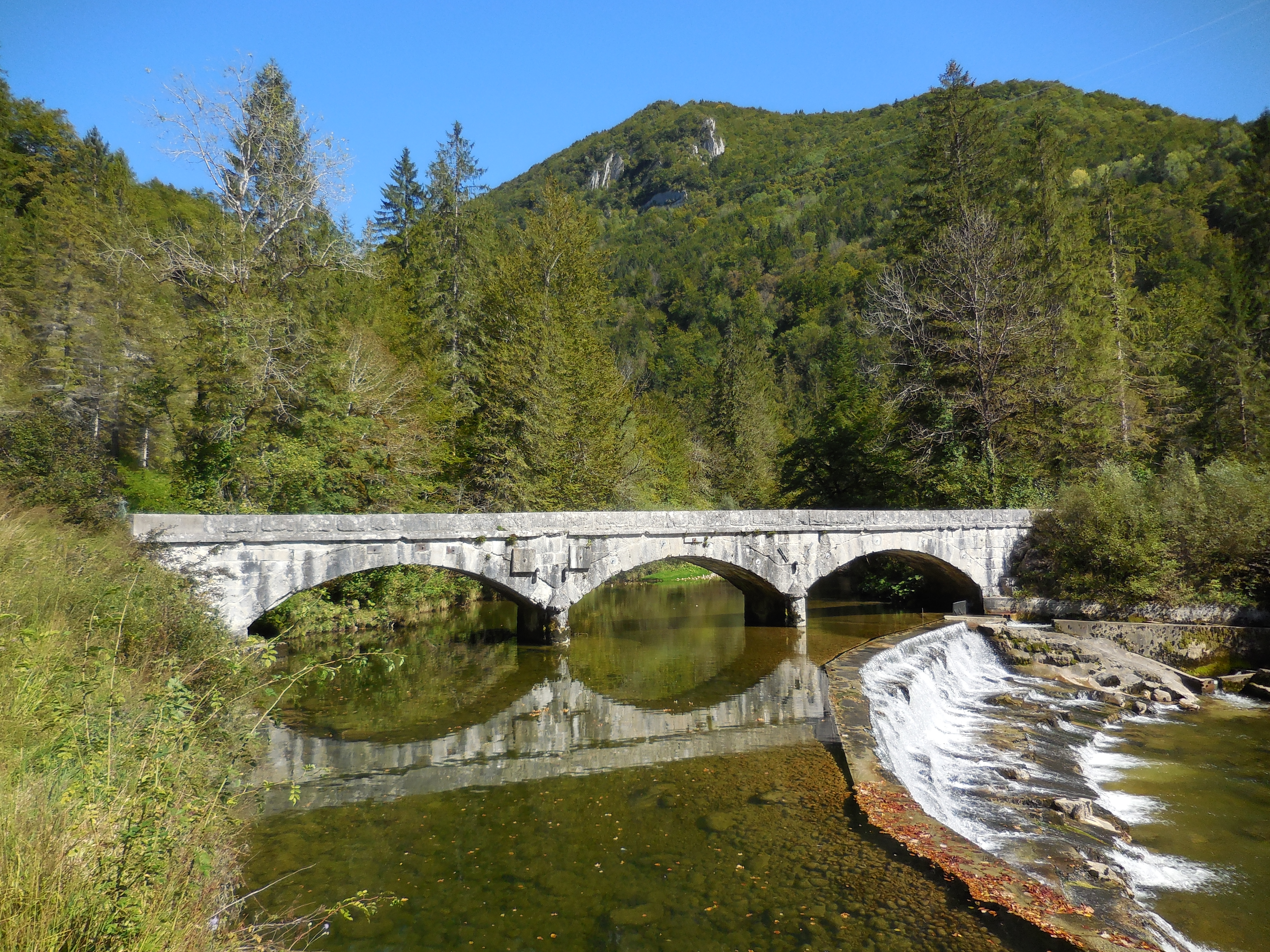
- Roche Blanche bridge
- Location of La Rixouse
- Location within France Location within Bourgogne-Franche-Comté
- Coordinates: 46°28′11″N 5°53′17″E
- Country: France
- Region: Bourgogne-Franche-Comté
- Department: Jura
- Arrondissement: Saint-Claude
- Canton: Saint-Claude

Government
  - Mayor (2020–2026): Pascal Bonin
- Area^{1}: 12.59 km^{2} (4.86 sq mi)
- Highest elevation: 996 m (3,268 ft)
- Lowest elevation: 443 m (1,453 ft)
- Population (2023): 184
  - Density: 14.6/km^{2} (37.9/sq mi)
- Time zone: UTC+01:00 (CET)
  - Summer (DST): UTC+02:00 (CEST)
- INSEE/Postal code: 39460 /39200
- ^{1} French Land Register data, which excludes lakes, ponds, glaciers > 1 km^{2} (0.386 sq mi or 247 acres) and river estuaries.

La Rixouse (French pronunciation: [la ʁiksuz]) is a commune in the Jura department in the region of Bourgogne-Franche-Comté in eastern France.

== Population ==
Historical population
Year	Pop.	±% p.a.
1968	129	—
1975	107	−2.64%
1982	142	+4.13%
1990	173	+2.50%
1999	215	+2.44%
2007	207	−0.47%
2012	193	−1.39%
2017	193	+0.00%
2023	184	−0.79%
Source: INSEE

== See also ==
- Communes of the Jura department
