= Romainmôtier Priory =

Coordinates: 46°41′36″N 6°27′41″E

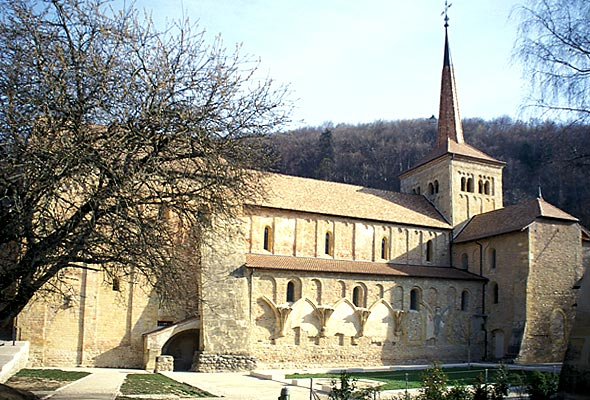
Romainmôtier Priory

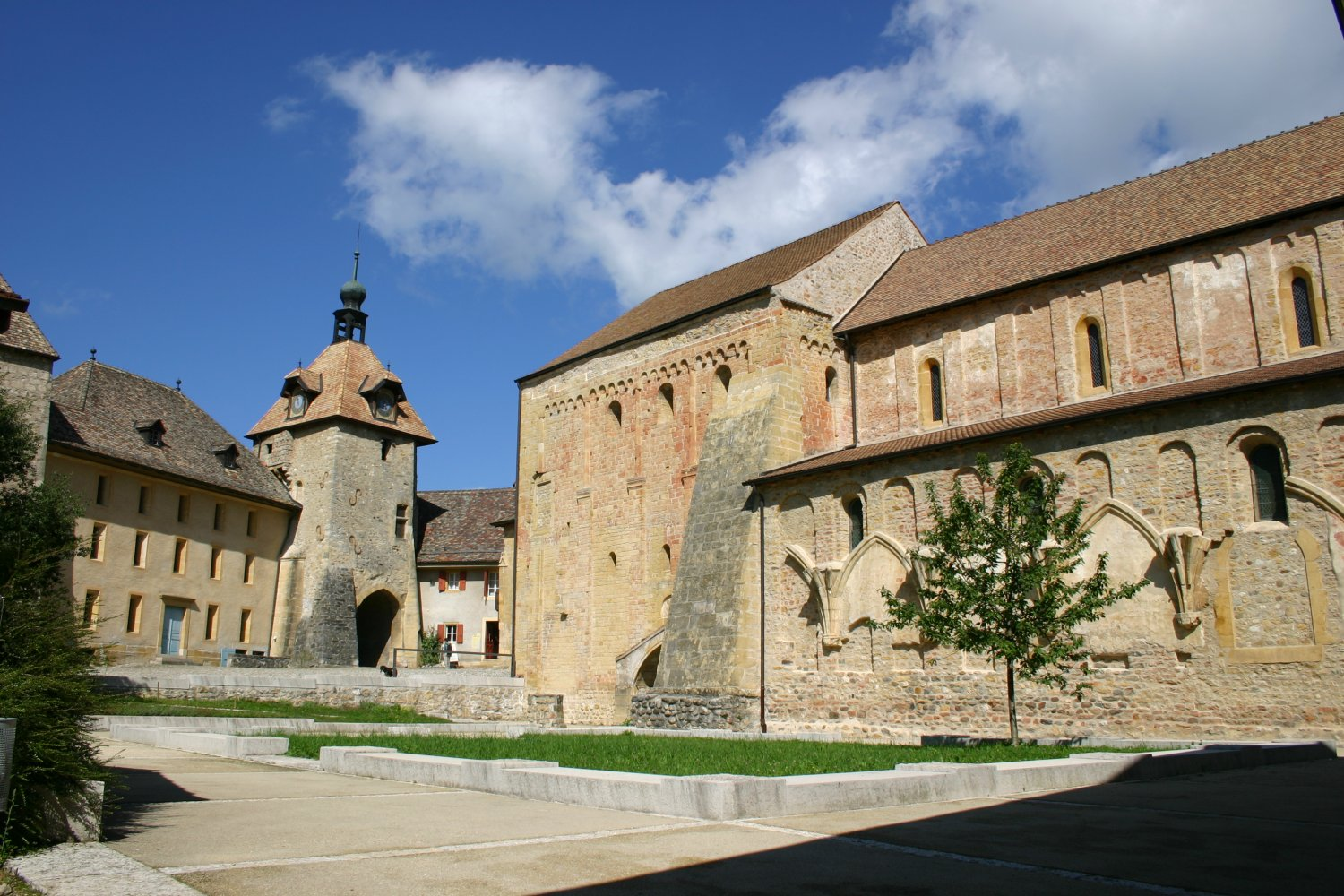
Courtyard around the priory

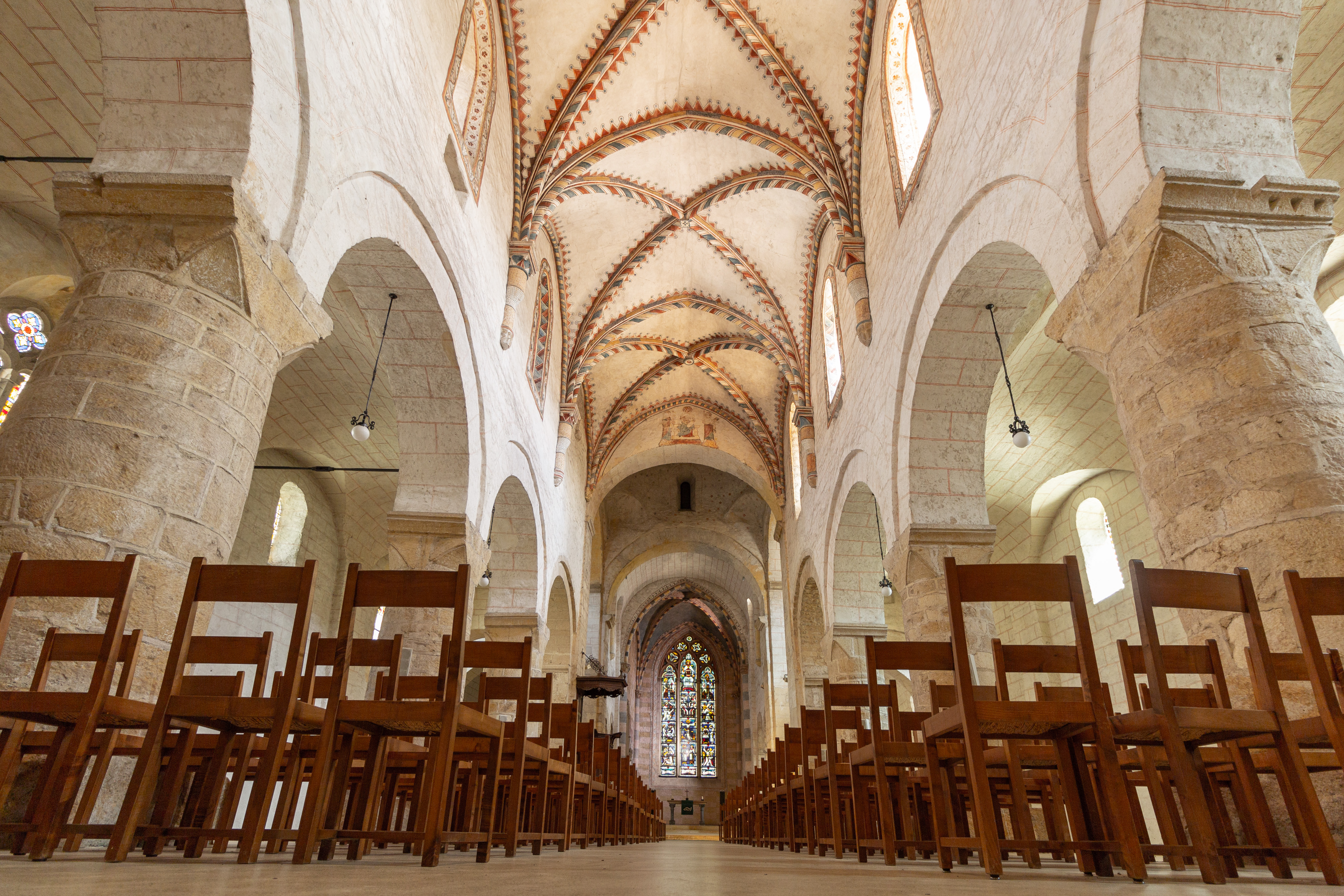
Interior of the priory church

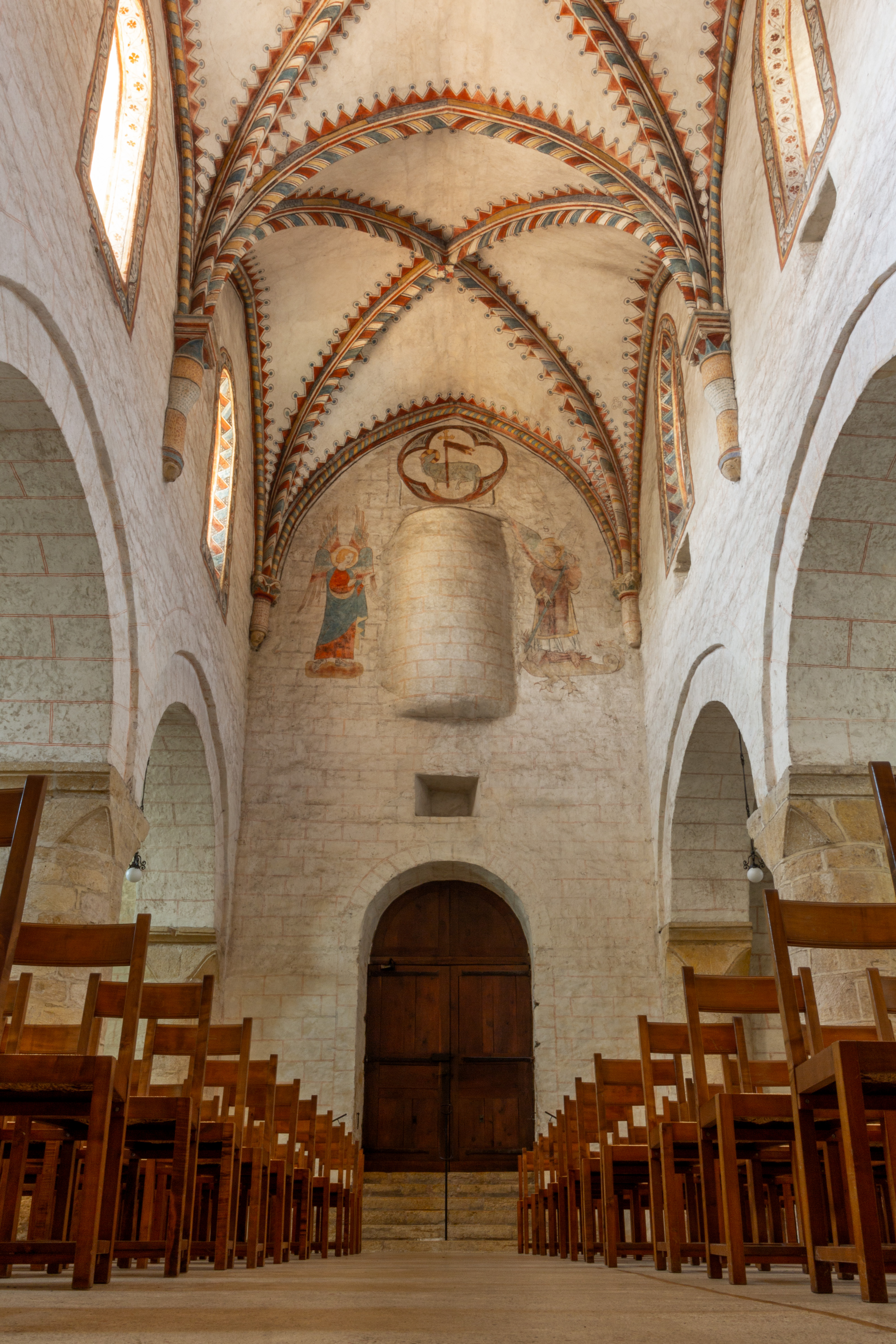
Interior of the priory church

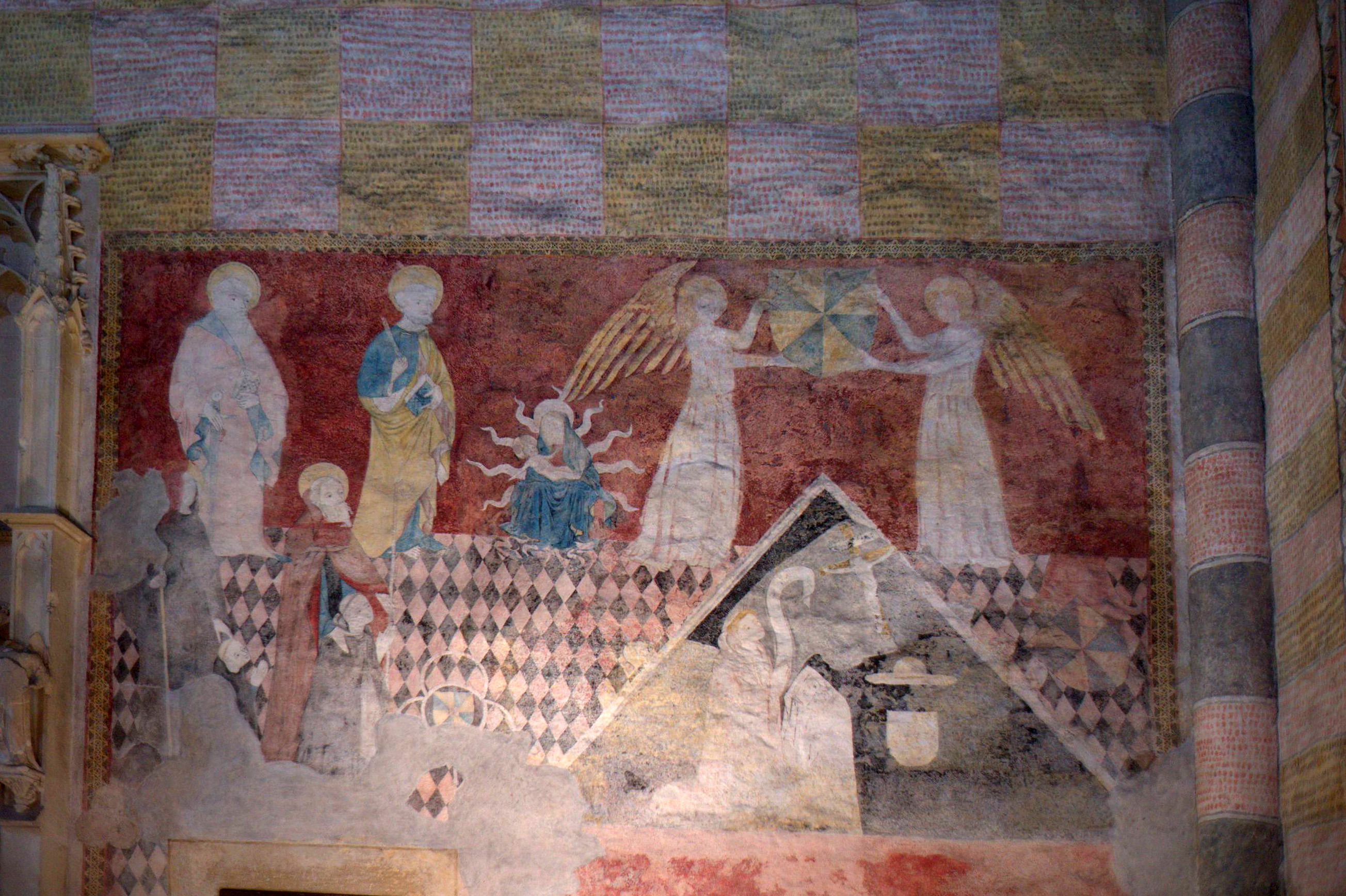
Painting in the priory church

Romainmôtier Priory is a former Cluniac priory in the municipality of Romainmôtier-Envy in the canton of Vaud in Switzerland. The monastery was founded by Romanus of Condat, after whom it was named. It is entered on the Swiss Inventory of Cultural Property of National and Regional Significance.

== History ==
=== Early monastery ===
The first monastery at Romainmôtier was built in approximately 450 AD by Romanus of Condat. Romanus was born in 390 and died on the 28th of February 463. At the age of 35, he went into the region of Condat to live as a hermit, later followed by his brother Lupicinus. Many scholars, including Saint Eugendus, placed themselves under the direction of the two brothers, who founded several monasteries, including Romainmôtier (Romanum monasterium), in the canton of Vaud in Switzerland. Romanus was ordained a priest by Saint Hilary of Arles in 444, and, with Lupicinus, he directed these monasteries until his death. Two lives of him are in existence: one by Gregory of Tours in the "Liber vitae patrum", and an anonymous "Vita Sanctorum Romani, Lupicini, Eugendi". It was Gregory of Tours that dated the building of the monastery to 450. Only a rhymed chronicle from the 13th century and the writings of Commissioner Aymonnet Pollen (1519) describe the founding of Romainmôtier Priory. Excavations carried out between 1905 and 1915 discovered traces of a church dating from the early 5th century, which confirmed the given date. In the 6th century, there is a record of an abbot Florianus who was abbas ex monasterio de Romeno, which is thought to be Romainmôtier.

=== Second expansion ===
The early monastery fell into disrepair and was later rebuilt by Duke Chramnelenus. The rebuilt monastery was placed under the monastic rule of Saint Columbanus by 642. In 649, Saint Wandregisel, the future abbot of Fontenelle Abbey, visited Romainmôtier and found a thriving and diverse monastic life. The 5th-century church was enlarged, and, later in the 7th century, a second church was built with a rectangular choir, being built on the south side of the first. Pope Stephen II visited the monastery in 753 whilst traveling for a meeting with Pepin the Short and, according to tradition, consecrated the churches of Saints Peter and Saint Paul.

In the 9th century, Romainmôtier saw another period of decline. Lay abbots took possession of the monastery. In 888, the Guelph King Rudolf I of Burgundy gave the priory and its lands to his sister, Saint Adela (also referred to as Adelheid or Adelaide), the wife of the Duke of Burgundy, Richard II. On 14 June 928, Adelaide gave the monastery and its lands to Cluny Abbey. However, little changed for the monastery, as it remained a possession of the Burgundian royal family. During this period, the monastery was home to a community of Canons Regular rather than monks. At a point between 966 and 990, King Conrad of Burgundy renounced all his rights and gave the monastery to Abbot Maiolus of Cluny. Under Cluny Abbey, Romainmôtier Priory experienced its third golden age.

=== The medieval monastery ===
Abbot Odilo of Cluny, who resided multiple times in Romainmôtier, had the present church built at the end of the 10th century. This church was modelled after the second church of Cluny Abbey (Cluny II). At the start of the 12th century, the church was modified by the construction of an ornate narthex, and, later in the 13th century, with a gatehouse. The last modifications were made to the church in 1445. The monastery church of Romainmôtier is one of the most important examples of Cluniac Romanesque art in Switzerland.

While Odilo had managed Romainmôtier himself, his successors remained at Cluny Abbey and were represented by a prior. Until the end of the 12th century, this office was only granted for a limited number of years, later becoming a lifetime appointment. In the 10th and 11th centuries, the monastery was fighting against aristocratic families of the region (Grandson, Salins) who were trying to expand their estates at the expense of the priory. These conflicts ended at the beginning of the 12th century. However, the pariage of 1181, in which Beatrix of Burgundy, the wife of Frederick Barbarossa, and the priory divided their rights, appears not to have been followed. Until the 14th century the priory was under Imperial protection. The lord of Les Clées exercised oversight on behalf of his feudal lords, particularly the Savoys.

The property of the priory included the territory around the monastery, which was known as La Poté (derived from the Latin word potestas), or Terre de Romainmôtier. By 1050, this property consisted of twelve villages. The priory also possessed land in Apples and in Bannans in Franche-Comté. They owned rights or smallholdings in 45 other locations. In the 12th century, small priories were established in Bursins, Mollens, Vufflens-la-Ville, Vallorbe and Lay-Damvautier to manage the far-flung holdings of Romainmôtier. The small priories had all become independent from Romainmôtier by the 14th century. The priories of Bevaix and Corcelles were affiliated with Romainmôtier in the 12th century, but until its secularization during the Protestant Reformation, they retained a certain independence. In the 11th century, they founded a hospital in Orbe, which operated until the mid-13th century.

In the 11th century, the inhabitants of the Poté were still serfs, but in 1266 they were awarded a special legal status: they possessed personal freedom and were allowed to dispose freely of their goods, but were obliged to be faithful to the prior. If they moved outside the Poté or swore loyalty to another noble, they were expelled from the dominion and lost any items that they had been given by the priory. A familia grew up around the prior consisting of laity who worked for the priory. It included artisans (bakers, cooks, porters, clerks, etc.), officers who worked in the villages as administrators or as local police, and citizens of the city of Romainmôtier. Those of the familia class were not subject to compulsory service or collective work, but were required to pay the heriot or death tax.

=== The early modern and modern monastery ===
After a financial crisis in the 14th century, the monastery recovered and reached the height of its power at the end of the 14th and early 15th century. In the mid-15th century it passed into the secular hands of the Savoy dynasty and their associates. The income of the abbey became a source of personal income, and the monastic rules were less and less respected. When the Protestant Reformation arrived in 1536, the monastery was already on the decline. In the 14th century about twenty monks still lived in the priory. By the 16th century it was about ten.

Despite the protests of Fribourg, Bern secularized the priory on 27 January 1537. The priory church was now used for Reformed service, and the cloister was destroyed. The prior's house was converted into a castle for the Bernese Vogt, and the remaining buildings were rented or sold. Only some of the more distant properties escaped being taken by Bern. Some monks settled in Vaux-et-Chantegrue and created a simple countryside priory, which was abolished during the French Revolution. The priory buildings were restored in 1899–1915 and again in 1992–2000.
