= Nanchez =

Commune in Bourgogne-Franche-Comté, France

- Commune
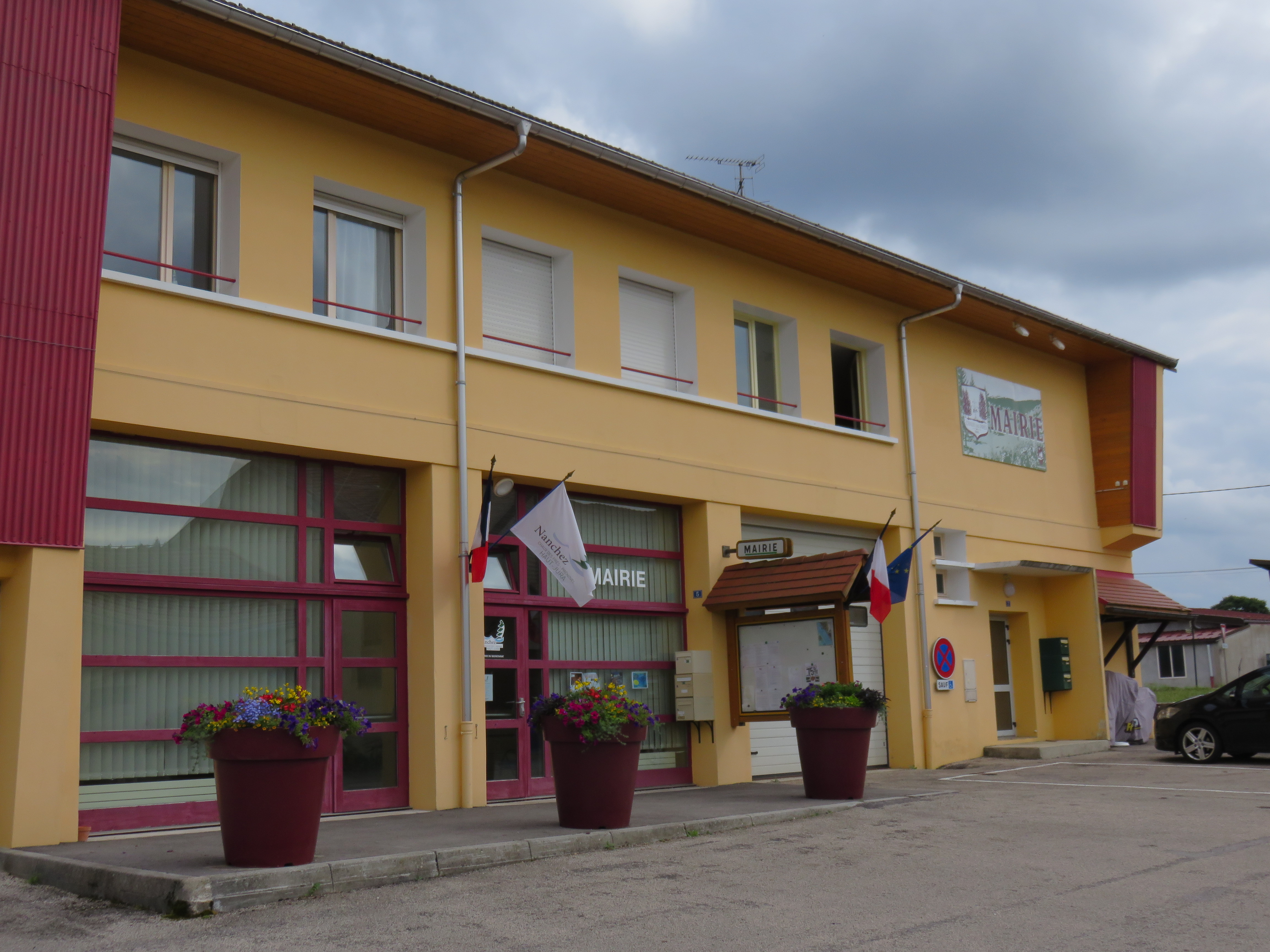
- The town hall in Chaux-des-Prés
- Location of Nanchez
- Location within France Location within Bourgogne-Franche-Comté
- Coordinates: 46°30′29″N 5°52′01″E
- Country: France
- Region: Bourgogne-Franche-Comté
- Department: Jura
- Arrondissement: Saint-Claude
- Canton: Saint-Claude
- Intercommunality: la Grandvallière

Government
  - Mayor (2020–2026): Yvan Auger
- Area^{1}: 31.65 km^{2} (12.22 sq mi)
- Highest elevation: 1,045 m (3,428 ft)
- Lowest elevation: 485 m (1,591 ft)
- Population (2023): 764
  - Density: 24.1/km^{2} (62.5/sq mi)
- Time zone: UTC+01:00 (CET)
  - Summer (DST): UTC+02:00 (CEST)
- INSEE/Postal code: 39130 /39150
- ^{1} French Land Register data, which excludes lakes, ponds, glaciers > 1 km^{2} (0.386 sq mi or 247 acres) and river estuaries.

Nanchez (French pronunciation: [nɑ̃ʃe]) is a commune in the Jura department of eastern France. The municipality was established on 1 January 2016 by the merger of the former communes of Chaux-des-Prés and Prénovel. On 1 January 2019, the former communes Les Piards and Villard-sur-Bienne were merged into Nanchez.

== See also ==
- Communes of the Jura department
