= Bracon, Jura =

Commune in Bourgogne-Franche-Comté, France

Bracon
- Commune
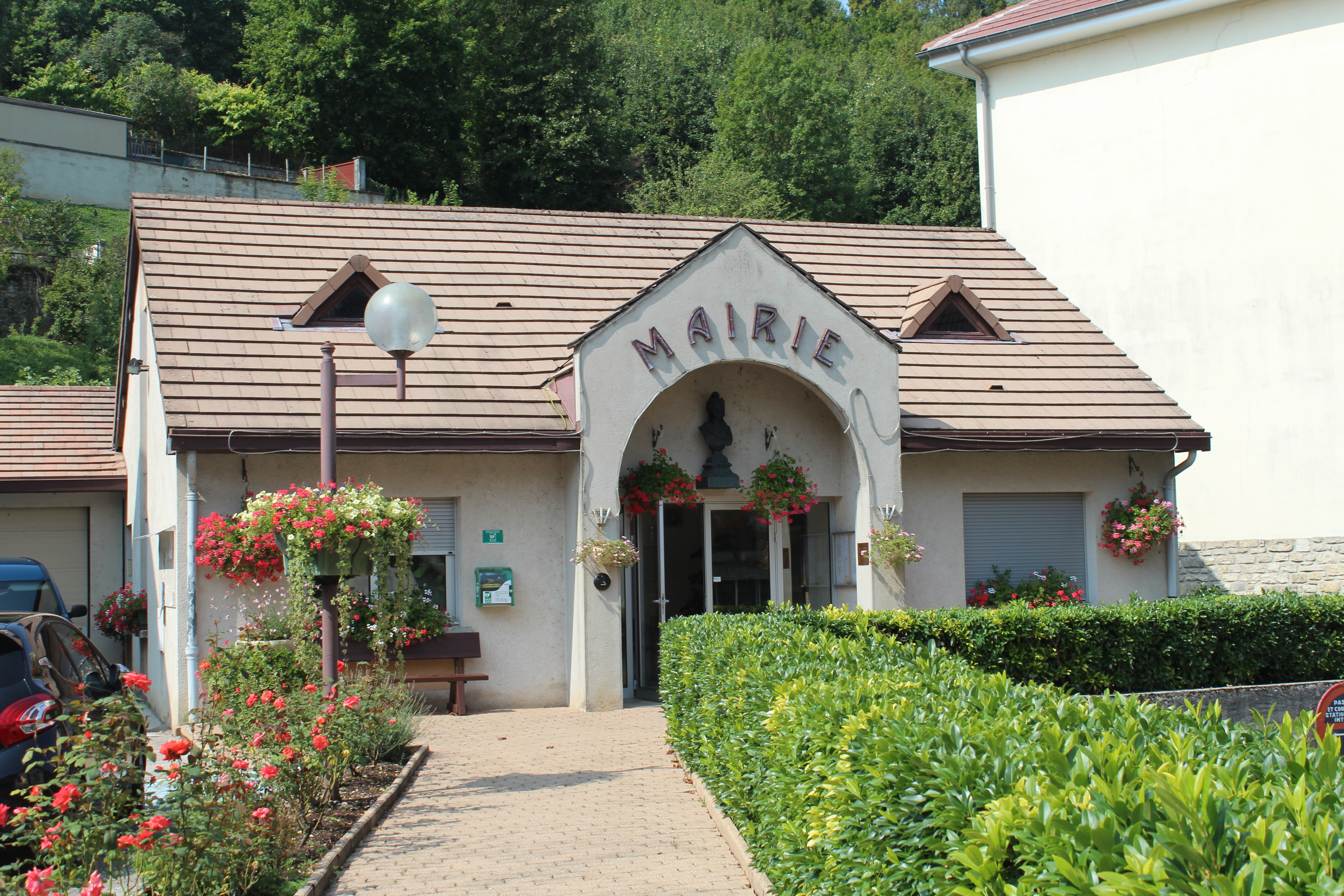
- The town hall in Bracon
- Location of Bracon
- Location within France Location within Bourgogne-Franche-Comté
- Coordinates: 46°55′53″N 5°52′55″E
- Country: France
- Region: Bourgogne-Franche-Comté
- Department: Jura
- Arrondissement: Dole
- Canton: Arbois

Government
  - Mayor (2020–2026): Patrice Villalonga
- Area^{1}: 6.29 km^{2} (2.43 sq mi)
- Highest elevation: 626 m (2,054 ft)
- Lowest elevation: 345 m (1,132 ft)
- Population (2023): 398
  - Density: 63.3/km^{2} (164/sq mi)
- Time zone: UTC+01:00 (CET)
  - Summer (DST): UTC+02:00 (CEST)
- INSEE/Postal code: 39072 /39110
- ^{1} French Land Register data, which excludes lakes, ponds, glaciers > 1 km^{2} (0.386 sq mi or 247 acres) and river estuaries.

Bracon (French pronunciation: [bʁakɔ̃]) is a commune in the Jura department in Bourgogne-Franche-Comté in eastern France.

Local tradition holds that St. Claudius of Besançon was born here in the 7th century.

== Population ==
Historical population
Year	Pop.	±% p.a.
1968	266	—
1975	273	+0.37%
1982	330	+2.75%
1990	355	+0.92%
1999	332	−0.74%
2007	290	−1.68%
2012	280	−0.70%
2017	273	−0.51%
2023	398	+6.48%
Source: INSEE

== See also ==
- Communes of the Jura department
