= Agilmar =

Frankish archbishop

Agilmar (Note: Also given as Aglimar, Angelmal, Egilmar, Achilmar, Agilmarus, Aglimarus, Agelmarus, Egilmarus, Achilmarus or Allimaro.) (died 16 July 859/860) was the Frankish archbishop of Vienne, in modern France, from 842 to his death. Before being elected archbishop, he was the abbot of the abbey of Saint-Claude. He was also the arch-chancellor of Emperor Lothair I from 835 to 843.

Agilmar was elected to succeed Bernard (died 23 January 842) during the Frankish civil war of 840–43. Although he was supervising the chancery of Lothair I, he was in contact with the West Frankish king, Charles the Bald, from whom he received confirmation of his church's possessions in Aquitaine on 23 November 842. This meeting between Agilmar and Charles took place at a place called Theorenstein (perhaps Theorinsthe) in the kingdom of Burgundy (in regno Burgundiae) before the final peace between Charles and Lothair assigned the Burgundian kingdom, where Vienne lay, to Lothair. at the time of the confirmation, Agilmar was still only bishop-elect (electus episcopus) and had not been consecrated. He appears to have been still unconsecrated in June 843, when he was named as "chosen and called" (electus et vocatus) to the see. A document of 16 December 842 has the first use of the title "archbishop" for the unconsecrated bishop.

Following Lothair's death in 855, Agilmar held no special position at the court of his successor in the south, Charles of Provence. He did receive from the king some lands in the Lyonnais, the confirmation of one of his church's precaria and the restitution of certain lands which had been granted to Count Girard of Vienne during the reign of Emperor Louis the Pious. Count Girard and Archbishop Remigius of Lyon had expressly requested that Charles make this restitution in fulfillment of the canons of the council of Savonnières (859).
