= Diocese of Saint-Claude =

Catholic diocese in France

Coordinates: 46°23′11″N 5°51′59″E

Diocese of Saint-Claude Dioecesis Sancti Claudii Diocèse de Saint-Claude

Catholic
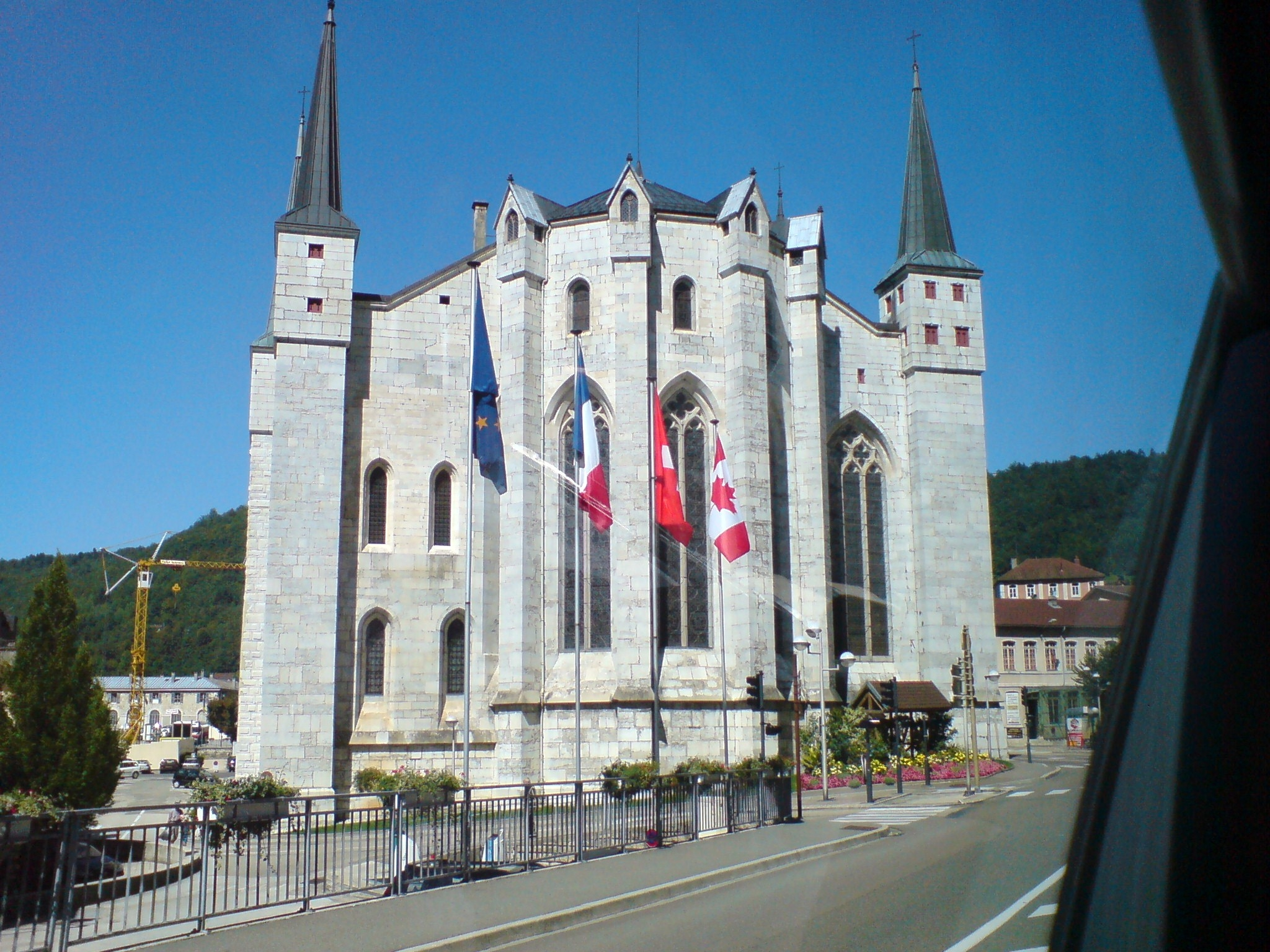
- Saint-Claude Cathedral

Location
- Country: France
- Ecclesiastical province: Besançon
- Metropolitan: Archdiocese of Besançon

Statistics
- Area: 4,499 km^{2} (1,737 sq mi)
- Population: Total; Catholics: (as of 2022); 258,000; 185,000 (71.7%)
- Parishes: 65 'new parishes'

Information
- Denomination: Catholic Church
- Sui iuris church: Latin Church
- Rite: Roman Rite
- Established: 22 January 1742
- Cathedral: Cathedral of Sts. Peter, Paul and Andrew
- Patron saint: St. Claudius of Besançon
- Secular priests: 56 (diocesan); 12 (Religious Orders)

Current leadership
- Pope: Leo XIV
- Bishop: Jean-Luc Gérard Garin
- Metropolitan Archbishop: Jean-Luc Bouilleret

Website
- www.eglisejura.com

The Diocese of Saint-Claude (Latin: Dioecesis Sancti Claudii; French: Diocèse de Saint-Claude) is a Latin Church ecclesiastical territory or diocese of the Catholic Church in France. The diocese corresponds in territory to the civil department of Jura. The city is 62 km (39 mi) north-northwest of Geneva, and 120 km (75 mi) south of Besançon. It was established in 1742.

The Diocese of Saint-Claude is a suffragan diocese in the ecclesiastical province of the metropolitan Archdiocese of Besançon, and formerly a suffragan of the Archdiocese of Lyon. Its cathedra is Saint-Claude Cathedral, in the episcopal see of Saint-Claude, Jura.

== History ==
The monks of the royal abbey of Saint-Claude had long since abandoned their strict Benedictine Rule. They had established a rule of their own, that each candidate needed to prove sixteen quarterings of nobility before being allowed to enter. They no longer lived in simple unadorned cells, but instead each had a luxurious apartment, provided with all the amenities. They were free to come and go as they wished.

On 12 September 1699, the abbey's abbot commendatory, Cardinal César d'Estrées, who was on his way to Rome, made his one and only visit. A year earlier, he had been ordered by Pope Innocent XII to carry out an apostolic visitation of the abbey to carry out a program of reform. Dissidents in the abbey's Chapter disputed the right of the legate to change the rules of their order and statutes adopted by them of long standing character. They claimed that since the abbey was directly dependent canonically on the pope, that only the pope could change their laws. Cardinal d'Estrées spent 16 days assessing the state of the abbey and its occupants, and on 28 September issued 13 provisional regulations.

When he arrived in Rome, d'Estrées continued working on the problems of Saint-Claude, consulted with cardinals in the Roman Curia, and, on 20 September 1700, issued an additional set of statutes, in five chapters with 127 articles. The members of the Chapter were to be 24 in number, which was never to be diminished. The cardinal's statutes were approved by King Louis XIV in letters patent in May 1701, and registered by the Parlement of Besançon on 13 July 1701. On 25 July, the Grand Prior Jacques-François d'Angeville, who had been appointed by Cardinal d'Estrées in 1700, summoned a meeting of the Chapter, and formally published the new statutes; four of the other officers of the Chapter announced that they accepted the statutes, though all the rest refused to accept them.

On 28 July 1701, the opponents of reform formally requested the Parlemenbt of Besançon to allow them to appeal against the statutes, alleging that they contained 21 abuses. Cardinal d'Estrées appealed to the Sorbonne, in what he termed a matter of conscience, and obtained a judgment stating that, in issuing his statutes there was no defect in person: he had the authorization of the Papacy, letters patent from the king, and the force of canon law. They ruled that no law had been imposed on the monks which was not in accordance with their religious vows.

=== Martène and Durand ===
In 1709, the two Benedictine scholars, Edmond Martène and Ursin Durand, were on an expedition to collect unpublished documents and manuscripts from monastic libraries. They visited several monasteries in the Jura before finally coming to Saint-Claude in November. They published a succinct account of their observations on the conditions at the abbey. "But this place which formerly used to be a school of sanctity, has today become, like Beaume and Gigny, a depository for noble families, who cannot place their offspring there without having previously demonstrated sixteen lines of nobility. The religious who live there bear the name and the habit of monks, but they live practically like canons, each one in separate apartments so magnificent that one can scarcely find similar ones among the laity. They all wear pectoral crosses like bishops.... Some of them, nonetheless, four or five in number, a bit more zealous than the others, eat in common and live in one apartment. We stayed with them." Eight years after their promulgation, the statutes were not being obeyed by the majority of monks.

=== Tentative steps ===
In 1714, King Louis XIV, who was interested in solving the problems of the abbey of Saint-Claude, finally consented to the proposal of secularizing the Chapter, but, bypassing the proposal that the abbey be turned into a collegiate church, he proposed that it be made a diocese. One obstacle to the plan was removed by the death of Cardinal César d'Estrées, the former abbot commendatory of Saint-Claude, on 14 December 1714. King Louis himself died on 1 September 1715. In 1701, however, Cardinal d'Estrées had passed on the abbatial office to his nephew, Jean d'Estrées, who died on 3 March 1718. Louis de Bourbon-Condé was named abbot commendatory in May 1718.

=== Establishment ===
The diocese was created by a bull of Pope Benedict XIV on 22 January 1742. It was composed of the twenty-six parishes which already belonged to the abbey of Saint-Cloud, to which were added several parishes from the diocese of Besançcon, and from the diocese of Lyon. The diocese of Saint-Claude was assigned as a suffragan (subordinate) of the archbishop of Lyon.

In accordance with the Concordat of Bologna (1516), King Louis XV nominated Bishop Jean Bouhier of Dijon to be the first bishop of Saint-Claude. The bishop declined. On 20 August 1741, King Louis then nominated the 32-year-old Jean-Baptiste-Joseph de Méallet de Fargues, who was a Canon-Count of the cathedral of Lyon.

==== Chapter and cathedral ====
The new cathedral was to be staffed and administered by a corporation called the Chapter, which was to consist of 4 dignities and 20 canons. The dignities were to be: the Dean, who was to be named by the pope; the first archdeacon, who was to be named by the bishop; the second archdeacon, who was to be named by the bishop; and the cantor, who was to be named jointly by the bishop and the Chapter. A candidate had to be a canon who possessed either a licenciate in theology or a licenciate in canon law, at least a subdeacon, and capable of being ordained a priest within a year. If there were no eligible candidates, the dignity could be conferred on a person outside the Chapter. The rule was still in effect from the days of the monastery that a candidate for a canonry had to demonstrate sixteen quarterings of nobility.

A diocesan synod was held by Bishop Joseph de Méallet de Fargues (1742–1785) on 1 August 1759, and the statutes were published. In September 1901, Bishop François-Alexandre Maillet presided over a diocesan synod, and had the statutes published.

=== French Revolution ===
Even before it directed its attention to the Church directly, the National Constituent Assembly attacked the institution of monasticism. On 13 February 1790. it issued a decree which stated that the government would no longer recognize solemn religious vows taken by either men or women. In consequence, Orders and Congregations which lived under a Rule were suppressed in France. Members of either sex were free to leave their monasteries or convents if they wished, and could claim an appropriate pension by applying to the local municipal authority.

The National Constituent Assembly ordered the replacement of political subdivisions of the ancien régime with subdivisions called "departments", to be characterized by a single administrative city in the center of a compact area. The decree was passed on 22 December 1789, the boundaries fixed on 26 February 1790, with the institution to be effective on 4 March 1790. A new department was created called "Jura," and Saint-Claude was one of the districts assigned to that department. The National Constituent Assembly then, on 6 February 1790, instructed its ecclesiastical committee to prepare a plan for the reorganization of the clergy. At the end of May, its work was presented as a draft Civil Constitution of the Clergy, which, after vigorous debate, was approved on 12 July 1790. There was to be one diocese in each department, requiring the suppression of approximately fifty dioceses. The diocese of Saint-Claude became the diocese of Jura, with its seat at Saint-Claude, and was assigned to the "Metropole de l'Est", with its metropolitan seated in Besançon.

In the Civil Constitution of the Clergy, the National Constituent Assembly also abolished cathedral chapters, canonicates, prebends, chapters and dignities of collegiate churches, chapters of both secular and regular clergy of both sexes, and abbeys and priories whether existing under a Rule or in commendam. The bishops and priests elected by the departmental electors became salaried employees of the state.

Bishop Jean-Baptiste Chabot (1785–1801) refused to take the obligatory oath to the Civil Constitution, and therefore his position was declared vacant by the French government. When the elected constitutional bishop, François-Xavier Moïse, arrived in 1791, Bishop Chabot was forced to flee; he emigrated to Lugano, and when Pope Pius VII called for the resignation of all the bishops in France, he dutifully handed in his resignation. On 9 April 1802, he was appointed bishop of Mende.

Constitutional Bishop Moïse held a synod of his constitutional clergy at Salins on 5–6 August 1800.

==== Restoration ====
The French Directory fell in the coup engineered by Talleyrand and Napoleon on 10 November 1799. The coup resulted in the establishment of the French Consulate, with Napoleon as the First Consul. To advance his aggressive military foreign policy, he decided to make peace with the Catholic Church and the Papacy. On 29 November 1801, in the concordat of 1801 between the French Consulate, headed by First Consul Napoleon Bonaparte, and Pope Pius VII, the bishopric of Saint-Claude (Jura) and all the other dioceses in France were suppressed. This removed all the institutional contaminations and novelties introduced by the Constitutional Church. The diocesan structure was then re-established, though the diocese of Saint-Claude was not revived.

In 1814, the French monarchy was restored, and on 24 May 1814, the pope returned to Rome from exile in Savona. Work began immediately on a new concordat, to regularize the relations between the two parties. In implementation of the concordat of 27 July 1817, between King Louis XVIII and Pope Pius VII, the diocese of Saint-Claude should have been restored by the bull "Commissa divinitus", but the French Parliament refused to ratify the agreement. It was not until 6 October 1822 that a revised version of the papal bull, now called "Paternae Charitatis" , fortified by an ordonnance of Louis XVIII of 13 January 1823, received the acceptance of all parties. The diocese of Saint-Claude became a suffragan of the archdiocese of Besançon.

== Bishops ==
- 1742–1785 : Joseph de Méallet de Fargues
- 1785–1801 : Jean-Baptiste Chabot

Constitutional bishop of Jura (schismatic)
1791–1801 : François-Xavier Moïse, constitutional bishop

- 1801–1823 : Suppressed
- 1823–1851 : Antoine Jacques de Chamon
- 1851–1858 : Jean Pierre Mabile
- 1858–1862 : Charles Jean Fillion
- 1862–1880 : Louis Anne Nogret
- 1880–1898 : César-Joseph Marpot
- 1898–1925 : François-Alexandre Maillet
- 1926–1948 : Rambert-Irénée Faure
- 1948–1975 : Claude-Constant Marie Flusin
- 1975–1994 : Gilbert-Antoine Duchêne
- 1994–2004 : Yves François Patenôtre
- 2005–2011 : Jean-Marie-Henri Legrez, O.P.
- 2011–2019 : Vincent Jordy
- 2020–present Jean-Luc Gérard Garin

== See also ==
- Catholic Church in France
- List of Catholic dioceses in France

== Sources ==
- Ritzler, Remigius; Sefrin, Pirminus (1958). Hierarchia catholica medii et recentis aevi. Vol. 6 (Tomus VI) (1730–1799). Patavii: Messagero di S. Antonio.
- Ritzler, Remigius; Sefrin, Pirminus (1968). Hierarchia Catholica medii et recentioris aevi (in Latin). Vol. VII (1800–1846). Monasterii: Libreria Regensburgiana.
- Remigius Ritzler; Pirminus Sefrin (1978). Hierarchia catholica Medii et recentioris aevi (in Latin). Vol. VIII (1846–1903). Il Messaggero di S. Antonio.
- Pięta, Zenon (2002). Hierarchia catholica medii et recentioris aevi (in Latin). Vol. IX (1903–1922). Padua: Messagero di San Antonio. ISBN 978-88-250-1000-8.

=== Studies ===
- Benoît, Joseph Paul Augustin (1892). Histoire de l'abbaye et de la terre de Saint-Claude. (in French). Volume 2. Montreuil-sur-mer: Imprimerie de la Chartreuse de Nôtre-Dame-des-Prés 1892.
- Brune, P. (1907). L'épiscopat français depuis le Concordat jusqu'à la Séparation (1802-1905). (in French). Paris: Société bibliographique (France), Librairie des Saints-Pères, 1907. pp. 554–557
- Ferroul-Montgaillard, Jean Joseph Gratien de (1855). Histoire de l'abbaye de St-Claude depuis sa fondation jusqu'à son érection en évêché. (in French). Volume 2. Lons-le-Saunier: Frédéric Gauthier, 1855.
- Hours, Bernard. "La création du diocèse de Saint-Claude, ou les vicissitudes d'une sécularisation (1634-1742)," (in French) in: Revue historique de l'église de France 70 (Turnholt: Brepols 1984). pp. 317–334. At Persée:
- Jean, Armand (1891). Les évêques et les archevêques de France depuis 1682 jusqu'a 1801. (in French). Paris: A. Picard, 1891. pp. 237–239.
- Pisani, Paul (1907). Répertoire biographique de l'épiscopat constitutionnel (1791-1802) (in French). Paris: A. Picard et fils.
- Rey, Maurice (1977). Les Diocèses de Besançon et de Saint-Claude. (in French). Paris: Beauchesne, 1977.
- Richard, Jean François Nicolas (1851). Histoire des diocèses de Besançon et de Saint-Claude. (in French). Volume 2. Besançon: Librairie ecclésiastique de Cornu, 1851. pp. 416–504

=== External links ===
- (in French) Centre national des Archives de l'Église de France, L’Épiscopat francais depuis 1919, retrieved: 2016-12-24.
- (in French) Diocesan page
