= Canton of Saint-Claude, Jura =

Coordinates: 46.3833°N 5.8667°E

Saint-Claude
- Canton
- Interactive map of Saint-Claude
- Country: France
- Region: Bourgogne-Franche-Comté
- Department: Jura
- No. of communes: {{{nbcomm}}}

Government
  - Representatives (2021–2028): Jean-Louis Millet and Catherine Chambard
- Area: 123 km^{2} (47 sq mi)
- Population (2023): 10,308
  - Density: 83.8/km^{2} (217/sq mi)
- INSEE code: 39 14

The Canton of Saint-Claude is a canton, situated in the Jura département and in the Bourgogne-Franche-Comté région of France.

== Composition ==
Since the French canton reorganisation which came into effect in March 2015, the communes of the canton of Saint-Claude are:

- Avignon-lès-Saint-Claude
- Leschères
- Nanchez
- Ravilloles
- La Rixouse
- Saint-Claude (chef-lieu)
