= Claudius of Besançon =

French abbot and bishop

Saint Claudius of Besançon
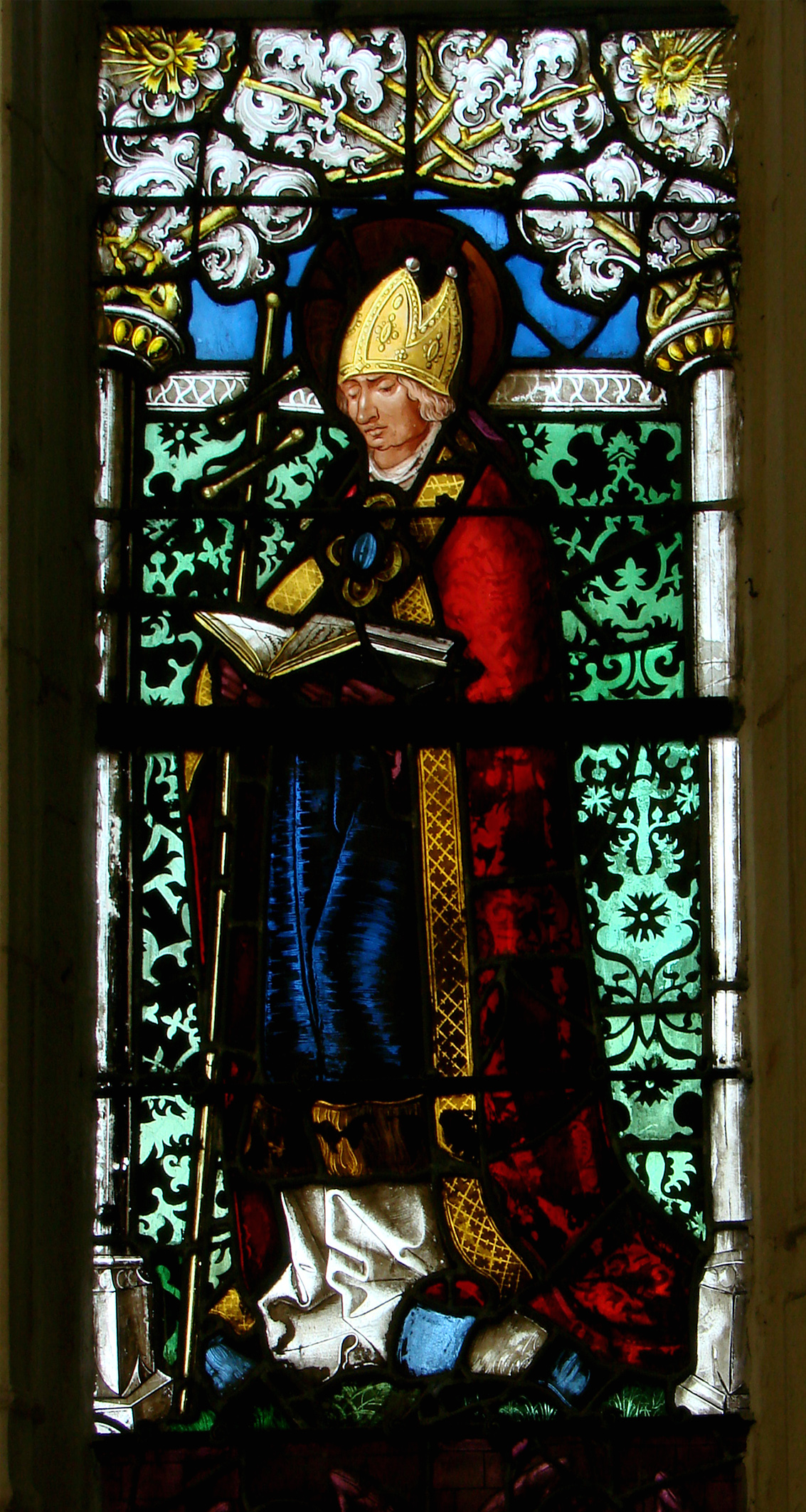
- Saint-Nicholas basilica, Saint-Nicolas-de-Port, Meurthe-et-Moselle, Lorraine, France. 16th century stained glass window representing Saint Claudius.
- Born: ~607; Bracon, Jura, near Salins-les-Bains, Kingdom of the Franks (now France)
- Died: 6 June 696 or 699 AD
- Venerated in: Roman Catholic Church; Eastern Orthodox Church
- Feast: 6 June

Saint Claudius of Besançon (French: Saint Claude), sometimes called Claude the Thaumaturge (c. 607 – 6 June 696 or 699 AD), was a priest, monk, abbot, and bishop. A native of Franche-Comté, Claudius became a priest at Besançon and later a monk. Georges Goyau in the Catholic Encyclopedia wrote that “The Life of St. Claudius, Abbot of Condat, has been the subject of much controversy.” Anglican Henry Wace claimed that "on this saint the inventors of legends have compiled a vast farrago of improbabilities."

Nevertheless, Wace did not find reason to doubt that Claudius had come from the nobility. According to a long tradition from Salins-les-Bains, Claudius was born in the castle of Bracon near Salins, of a Gallo-Roman family named Claudia. This family had produced another Saint Claudius in the 6th century.

One of his biographers, Laurentius Surius, writes that Claudius was entrusted to tutors at a young age and that in addition to studying academic subjects, Claudius spent hours reading devotional works, particularly the lives of the saints. Until the age of twenty, he served as a border guard, but in 627 he was appointed as a canon by Donatus (Donat), bishop of Besançon. Donatus had written regulations for his canon priests; Claudius followed them assiduously. He became famous as a teacher and ascete, eating only one frugal meal per day.

After serving as a priest at Besançon, Claudius entered the abbey of Condat, at Saint-Claude, Jura (which was named after him after his death), in the Jura Mountains. He was then elected to succeed as the twelfth abbot at Condat at the age of 34 in 641 or 642, during the pontificate of Pope John IV. He brought the Benedictine Rule to Condat. He obtained support from Clovis II (whose wife, Balthild, had persuaded him to do so), obtaining from the monarch an annuity. Under Claudius' rule, the abbey thrived. Claudius had built new churches and reliquaries, and fed the poor and the pilgrims in the area.

On the death of Saint Gervase, the bishop of Besançon, the clergy of that city elected Claudius as their archbishop in 685. He thus served, rather reluctantly, as 29th bishop of Besançon, according to the episcopal catalogues.

However, upon seeing that discipline had become lax at Condat, Claudius decided to abdicate his see and return as abbot at Condat." He then died in 696 or 699.

== Veneration ==
After his death Claudius became one of the popular saints of France. In the 9th century, Rabanus Maurus mentions Claudius in his Martyrologium as an intercessor, with the words VII idus junii, depositio beati Claudii, episcopi. His body, said to have been in an incorruptible state, and which had been hidden during the Arab invasions, was rediscovered in 1160, and visited in 1172 by Peter II of Tarentaise. The relics were solemnly carried throughout Burgundy before being brought back to Condat. However, a document from the ninth century does state that his body was already kept in the abbey of Saint-Claude (Saint Oyend, Oyand).

The town of Saint-Claude was originally named Saint-Oyand or Saint-Oyend after Saint Eugendus. However, when Claudius had, in 687, resigned his Diocese of Besançon and had died, in 696, as twelfth abbot, the number of pilgrims who visited Claudius' grave was so great that, since the thirteenth century, the name "Saint-Claude" came more and more into use and superseded the other name. Saint-Claude Cathedral, in the town, was dedicated to him.

Claudius's relics were burned in March 1794, during the French Revolution.

Queen Claude of France, first wife to Francis I of France, was named after him.
