= Saint-Claude, Jura =

Subprefecture and commune in Bourgogne-Franche-Comté, France

Saint-Claude
- Subprefecture and commune
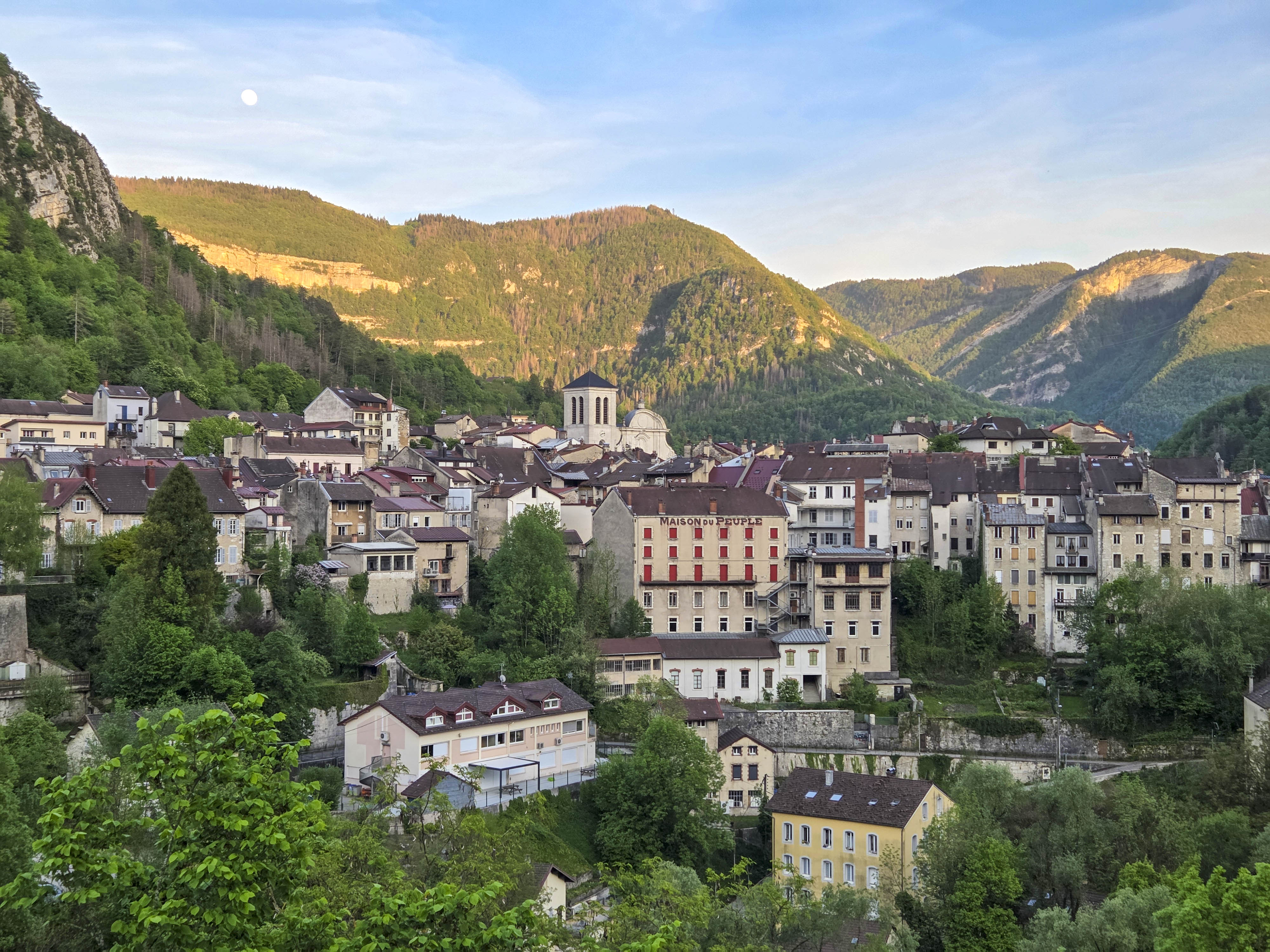
- A general view of Saint-Claude

- Flag Coat of arms
- Location of Saint-Claude
- Location within France Location within Bourgogne-Franche-Comté
- Coordinates: 46°23′16″N 5°51′50″E
- Country: France
- Region: Bourgogne-Franche-Comté
- Department: Jura
- Arrondissement: Saint-Claude
- Canton: Saint-Claude

Government
  - Mayor (2020–2026): Jean-Louis Millet
- Area^{1}: 70.19 km^{2} (27.10 sq mi)
- Elevation: 441 m (1,447 ft)
- Highest elevation: 1,222 m (4,009 ft)
- Lowest elevation: 360 m (1,180 ft)
- Population (2023): 8,386
  - Density: 119.5/km^{2} (309.4/sq mi)
- Time zone: UTC+01:00 (CET)
  - Summer (DST): UTC+02:00 (CEST)
- INSEE/Postal code: 39478 /39200
- ^{1} French Land Register data, which excludes lakes, ponds, glaciers > 1 km^{2} (0.386 sq mi or 247 acres) and river estuaries.

Saint-Claude (French pronunciation: [sɛ̃ klod]) is a commune and a sous-préfecture of the Jura department in the Bourgogne-Franche-Comté region in eastern France. It lies on the river Bienne.

== History ==
The town was originally named Saint-Oyand after Saint Eugendus. However, when St. Claudius had, in 690, resigned his Diocese of Besançon and died in 696 as twelfth abbot, the number of pilgrims who visited his grave was so great that, since the 13th century, the name "Saint-Claude" came more and more into use and has today superseded the other. It was the world capital of wooden smoking pipes crafted by hand from the mid 19th century to the mid 20th century. During WWII the town came under German occupation, yet still remained a haven for Jews escaping to Switzerland due to its proximity to it (about 8 km away, as the crow flies). As a punishment to the locals for consistently assisting and harbouring the fleeing Jews, the Nazis executed all of the town’s males of service age in the town centre. There is a memorial plaque in the city square commemorating the event. Today, there are several farms and ranches surrounding the town that produce many world famous brands of dairy (Comte cheese), beef (Charolaise), and poultry (Bresse Gauloise).

In 1974, Saint-Claude absorbed the former communes Valfin-lès-Saint-Claude, Ranchette, Chaumont, Chevry and Cinquétral.

== Population ==
The population data in the table below refer to the commune of Saint-Claude proper, in its geography at the given years.

Historical population

Year	Pop.	±% p.a.
1793	3,657	—
1800	3,579	−0.31%
1806	3,525	−0.25%
1821	4,463	+1.59%
1831	5,222	+1.58%
1836	5,238	+0.06%
1841	5,270	+0.12%
1846	5,471	+0.75%
1851	5,897	+1.51%
1856	5,885	−0.04%
1861	6,316	+1.42%
1866	6,809	+1.51%
1872	7,083	+0.66%
1876	7,550	+1.61%
1881	8,216	+1.71%
1886	8,932	+1.69%
1891	9,782	+1.83%
1896	10,146	+0.73%
1901	10,449	+0.59%

Year	Pop.	±% p.a.
1906	10,980	+1.00%
1911	12,022	+1.83%
1921	12,631	+0.50%
1926	13,947	+2.00%
1931	13,436	−0.74%
1936	11,381	−3.27%
1946	10,749	−0.57%
1954	11,301	+0.63%
1962	12,114	+0.87%
1968	12,486	+0.51%
1975	13,511	+1.13%
1982	12,715	−0.86%
1990	12,704	−0.01%
1999	12,303	−0.36%
2007	11,635	−0.70%
2012	10,534	−1.97%
2017	9,279	−2.51%
2023	8,386	−1.67%

Source: EHESS and INSEE (1968-2023)

== Transport ==
Saint-Claude is served by a railway station.

== Sport ==
Saint-Claude has a rugby club. The 2017 Tour de France passed through Saint-Claude. The town's close proximity to the forests and ski resorts makes it a popular destination for hiking, mountain biking, camping, and skiing/snowboarding. Many surrounding lakes (Lac de Vouglans, etc.) also provide numerous fishing and boating activities close to town.

== Sights ==
Saint-Claude Cathedral, former seat of the Bishops of Saint-Claude, is located here.

One of the landmarks in the city is the world largest model pipe (7.5 meters long and 8.7 meters high, weighing 600 kg) as a proof of its international reputation as the world capital of pipe manufacturing. The world's largest functioning pipe is in St. Claude, Manitoba, which was built in 1984 to honour early settlers from the namesake Saint-Claude, Jura. It was smoked by locals during a fair in 1986.

== Personalities ==
- Nadir Belhadj (born 1982), footballer
- Suzanne Belperron (1900–1983), jewelry designer
- Angelique Boyer (born 1988), actress
- Mevlüt Erdinç (born 1987), footballer
- Maud Forget (born 1982), actress
- Pierre Morel (1930–2011), cyclist
- René Nicod (1881–1950), politician
- Alexis Vuillermoz (born 1988), cyclist

== See also ==
- Communes of the Jura department
