= Elpidius of Lyon =

Elpidius of Lyon (m. Lyon, France, 422) also known as Helpidius was a pre-Congregation saint and 5th century bishop of Lyon.

== Life ==
He succeeded Antiochus of Lyon as bishop in 410AD and is well attested in the Episcopal lists and it was said of him that he well served his diocese, but outside of that nothing is known of his episcopate as his vita has been lost. His name was a common Roman cognomen.

== Death and legacy ==
He died of natural causes in 422 and his relics are laid in the Benedictine church of Sant Just, in Lyon. His feast day is 2 September.

He was succeeded by Sicarius of Lyon as Bishop.

== See also ==
- Catholic Church in France

Catholic Church titles
Preceded by Antiochus	Bishop of Lyon; 410-422	Succeeded by Sicarius of Lyon
