= Church of Saint-Just, Lyon =

Roman Catholic Church in Lyon, France

Coordinates: 45.7559°N 4.8204°E

Church of Saint-Just
- Church of Saint-Just of the Maccabees
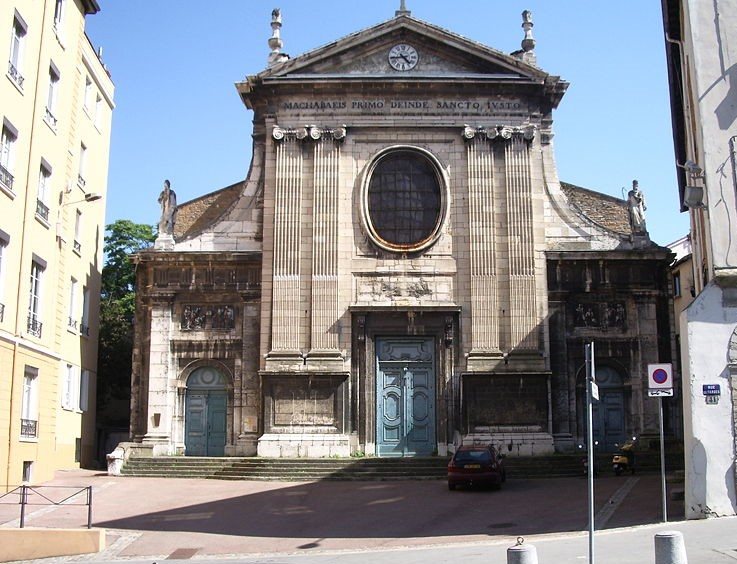
- Church of Saint-Just
- Country: Lyon, France

Architecture
- Groundbreaking: 1565
- Completed: 1663

Administration
- Archdiocese: Lyon

The church of Saint-Just (French: Église Saint-Just) or Church of Saint-Just of the Maccabees (Église Saint-Just des Macchabées) is a church in Lyon, France. It is located at 41 rue des Farges, in Lyon and until 2014, the church hosted the "French-speaking Orthodox parish of the Holy Encounter", a parish of the Orthodox Byzantine rite dependent on the patriarchate of Constantinople.

It was built around 1565 to replace the original Basilica of Saint Justus, the site of the coronation of Pope Clement V in 1305, which had been destroyed in 1562 by the Huguenot captain François de Beaumont. The church is now part of the Parish of Saint-Just-Saint-Irénée.

== History ==
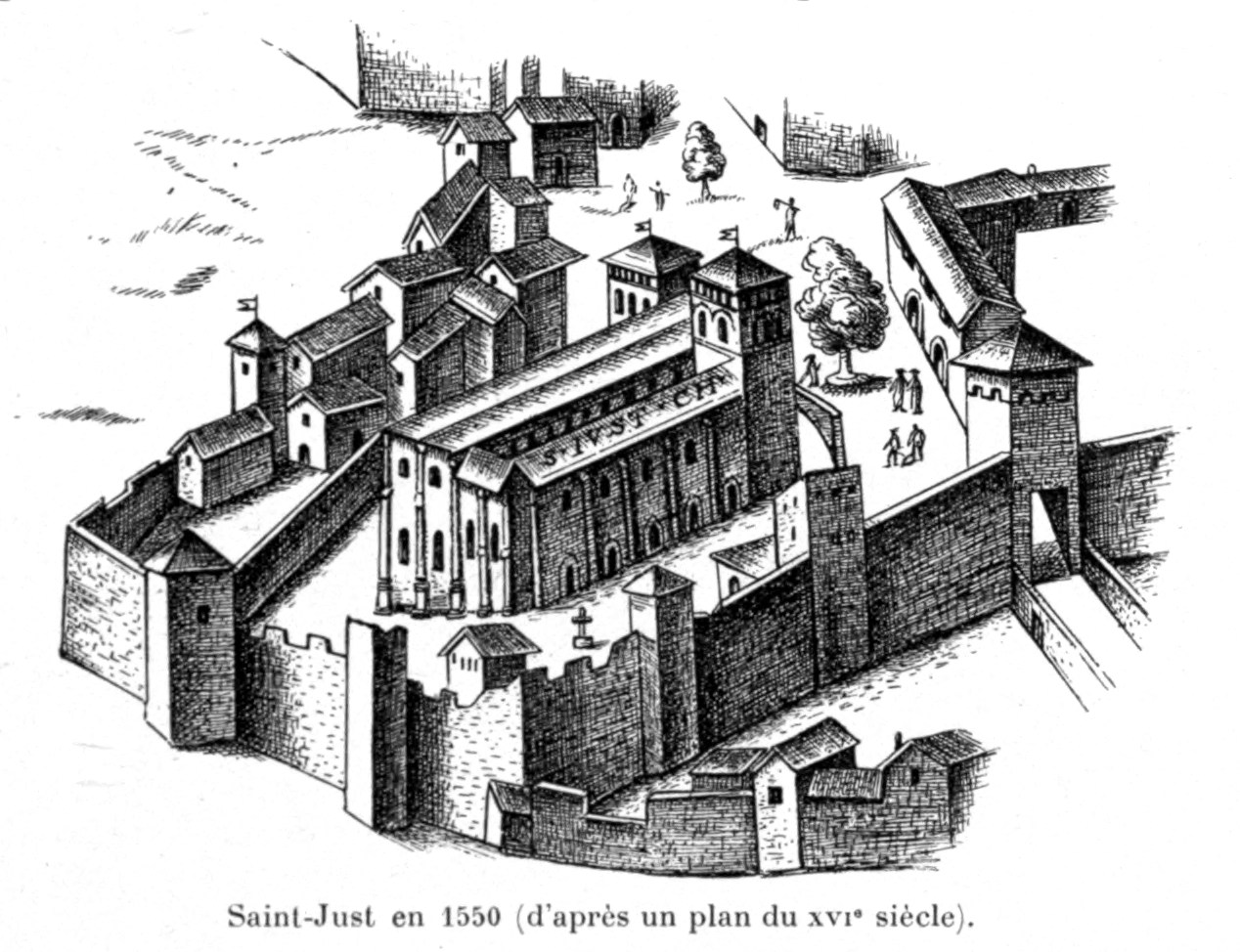
Old bascilica of St Just

After the destruction of the original Basilica of Saint Justus in 1562 by the Huguenot captain François de Beaumont, the canons decided to rebuild their collegiate church within the walls of the city. The two sites are 200 meters apart—one of the few examples of churches rebuilt at such a distance.

Construction began in 1565 and continued till 1663—at first rapidly, as the canons of the basilica wanted to celebrate a Mass by Christmas 1565—then slowed down for lack of money. The church was consecrated in 1591 by Archbishop Épinac. The chapter was abolished in 1791, during the French Revolution, when the church sustained much damage.

Restored in 1830, the church is now part of the Parish of Saint-Just-Saint-Irénée. The organ, built in 1921, was restored in 1972. Acoustics at Saint-Just are excellent, and many concerts of sacred music and choral singing are held there.

In September 2014, the Church was entrusted the pastoral care by the Archdiocese of Lyon to the Fathers of the Priestly Fraternity of St. Peter.

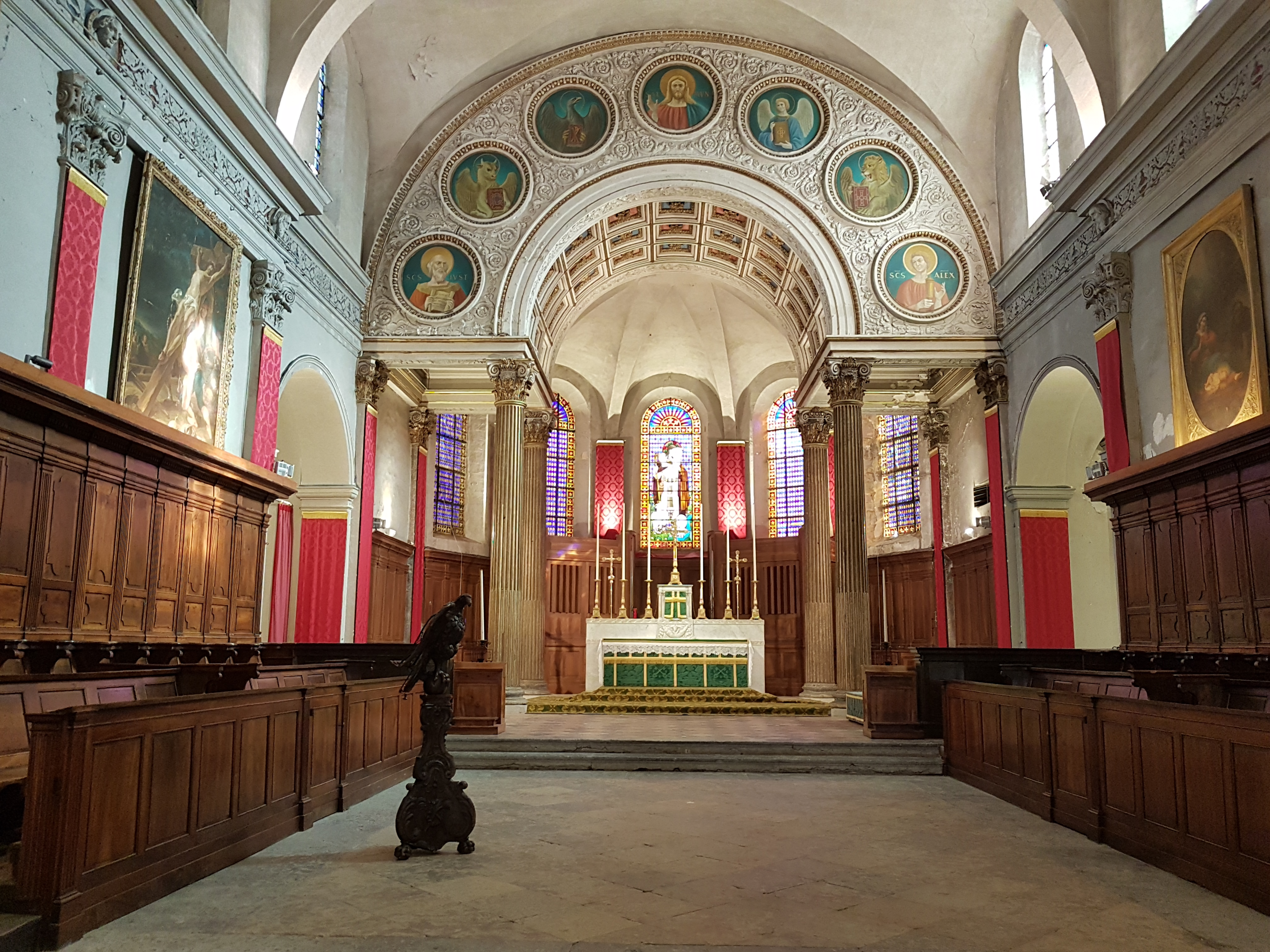
The Choir and the Sanctuary

== Architecture ==
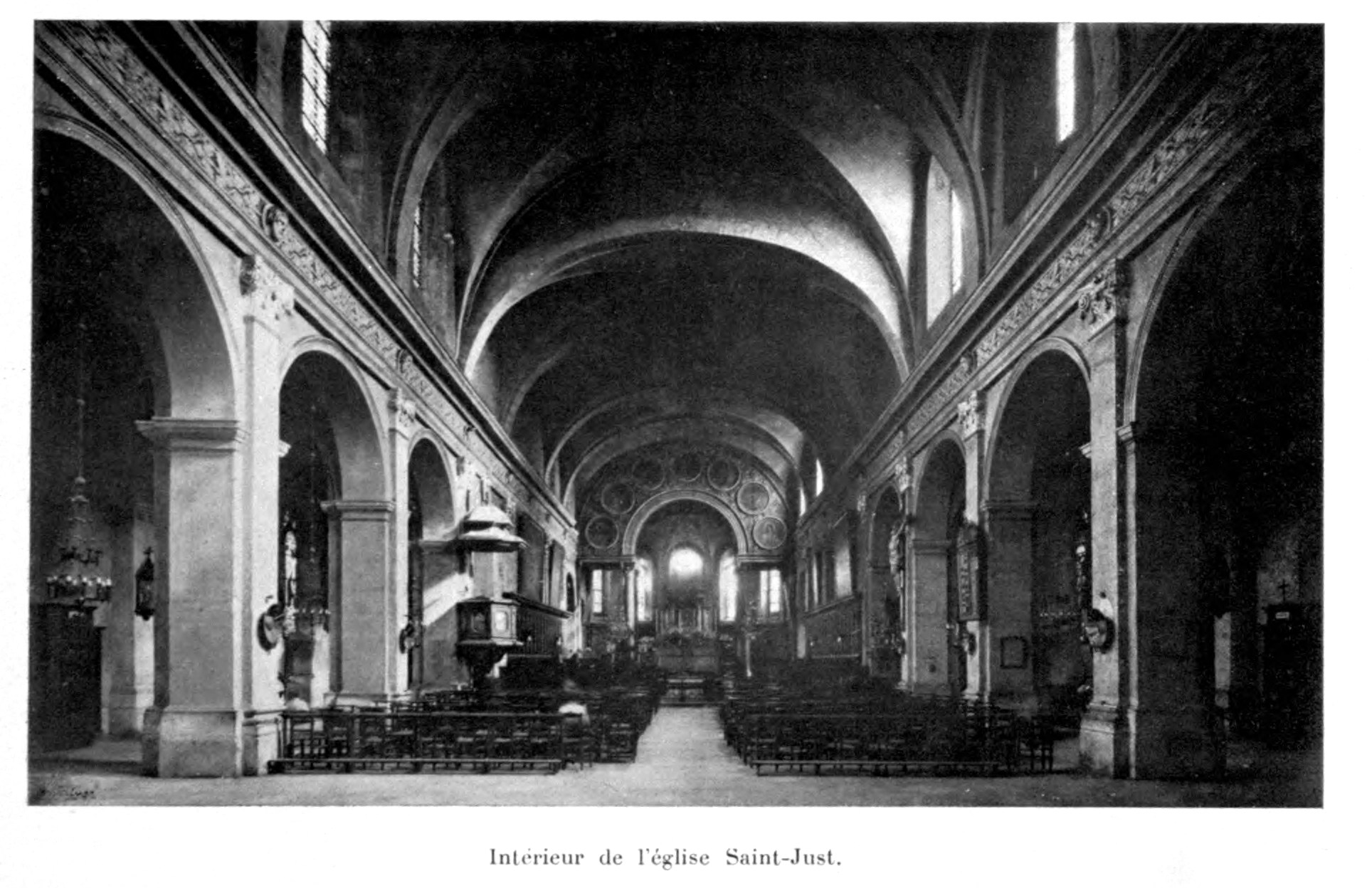
Inside the church (1908)

The Neoclassical facade was designed by Ferdinand-Sigismond Delamonce and dates to the early 18th century. It bears was an inscription that recalls the dedication of the ancient basilica to the Maccabees : Machabaeis primo deinde sancto iusto (For the Maccabees first then St Just).

In 1828, sculptor Jean-François Legendre-Héral produced the statues of St. Irenaeus and St. Justus at either end of the façade. He also provided two bas reliefs, one representing the martyrdom of St. Irenaeus and the other the translation of the relics of Saint-Just.

The nave can accommodate 400 people.

== Artworks ==
During the demolition of the old basilica, portraits of past bishops of Lyon were found buried in the ancient basilica of Saint-Just. The choir has a painting of the Annunciation by Hyacinthe Collin de Vermont and a Nativity by Hughes Taraval. The stained glass windows depicting the life of Saint-Just and early Christianity in Lyons which dates from the 19th century.

The church is classified as historical monuments since 1980.
