= Justus of Lyon =

Bishop of Lyon (d. 389 AD)

Saint Justus of Lyon
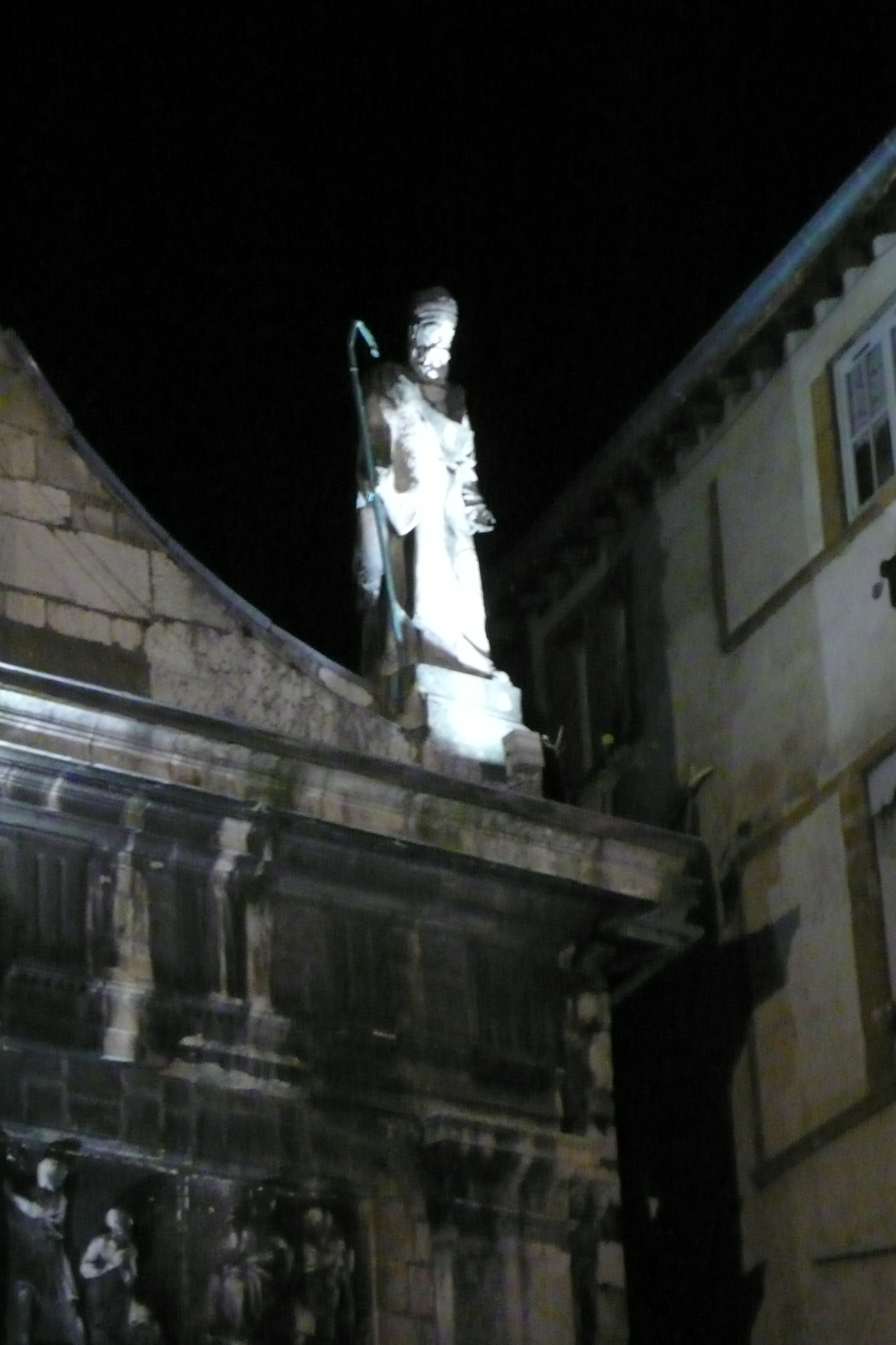
- Statue of Saint Justus atop the church dedicated to him, Lyon

Abbot, Hermit
- Born: early 4th century AD; Tournon, Roman Gaul, Roman Empire
- Died: c. 389 AD; Scetes, Roman Egypt (present-day Wadi El Natrun, Egypt)
- Venerated in: Roman Catholic Church; Eastern Orthodox Church
- Canonized: Pre-Congregation
- Major shrine: Church of Saint-Just, Lyon
- Feast: 2 September

Justus of Lyon (Latin: Iustus, lit. '"one who helps"') was the 13th Bishop of Lyon. He succeeded Verissimus in the mid-4th century. He is venerated as a saint by both the Catholic and the Orthodox Church, with a feast day on 2 September. Around 350, Justus was made Bishop of Lyon. As bishop of the capital of Gaul, he was among the participants of the Council of Valence of 374 regarding religious discipline of the clergy and the faithful. He later became a hermit.

== Biography ==
=== Early life ===
He was born in the first half of the 4th century in Tournon-sur-Rhône and came from an aristocratic family. He followed the religious teaching of Saint Paschasius, the Archbishop of Vienne at the time, and became a deacon of the Church of Vienne. A contemporary biographer describes him as being a meek and merciful man.

=== Bishop of Lyon ===
Around 350, Justus was made Bishop of Lyon. As bishop of the capital of Gaul, he was among the participants of the Council of Valencia of 374 regarding religious discipline of the clergy and the faithful.

He assisted at the Council of Aquileia, 381, organized by Ambrose of Milan. A general council had been requested by Arian bishops Palladius and Secundianus supported by the Empress Justina to review the Church's position on Arianism. Ambrose refused to hold a general council, agreeing only to a provincial council, but the Emperor Gratian allowed other bishops to attend. The bishops of Gaul sent delegates including Justus, who was one of 32 bishops at the council, which rejected Arianism and condemned Palladius and Secundianus.

At that time, he maintained a correspondence with Ambrose of Milan of which there remain only two letters from Ambrose discussing sections of Scripture. The two letters suggest that Justus was a man respected for his learning.

=== As a hermit ===
Some time after the Council of Aquileia, an incident took place where an insane individual in a violent fit, had attacked and killed several people in the streets of the city with a sword. Although eventually restrained, he managed to escape and take refuge in the church, at that time located on the side of the present church of St. Nizier. Despite threats, the Bishop maintained the right of sanctuary. At length a city magistrate arrived and persuaded Bishop Justus to hand the accused over to him, giving his word that the matter would be handled according to law. Relying on the magistrate's assurances Justus delivered the man over; but scarcely had the man left the church when the mob overpowered guards and seizing him, put him to death.

The bishop came to believe that his failure to adequately protect the murderer had made him unworthy to continue to lead the Christian community, and he resolved to devote the remainder of his life to doing penance. Disillusioned, Justus resigned his See, and retired to his house at Tournon. His friends could neither convince him that he was not responsible for the unfortunate man's death, nor to reconsider his decision of being unworthy to be bishop. One night he secretly left to take up the ascetical life of a hermit. He travelled to Arles, and then on to Marseille where he planned to embark for Alexandria. The cathedral lector, Viator suspected the Bishop's intentions, and decided to follow his master. He caught up with Justus at Marseille, and together they boarded ship for Egypt.

Once there, they joined the community of monks in the desert of Scetes, about 40 or 50 miles south of Alexandria, beyond the mountains of Nitria, in the Libyan Desert. At that time the leader or abbot of this community was St. Macarius of Egypt (or the Elder) († 390), a disciple of one of the founders of monasticism in Egypt, St. Anthony († 356). Macarius had a reputation for great holiness and a fierce asceticism. Most of the monks lived in cells, either dug in the ground or built of stones, and each out of sight of others. They came together only on Saturdays to celebrate the liturgy. They supported themselves by manual labor, and ate only the poorest of foods. Fasting, prayer, silence, and the keeping of night vigils, characterized their lives.

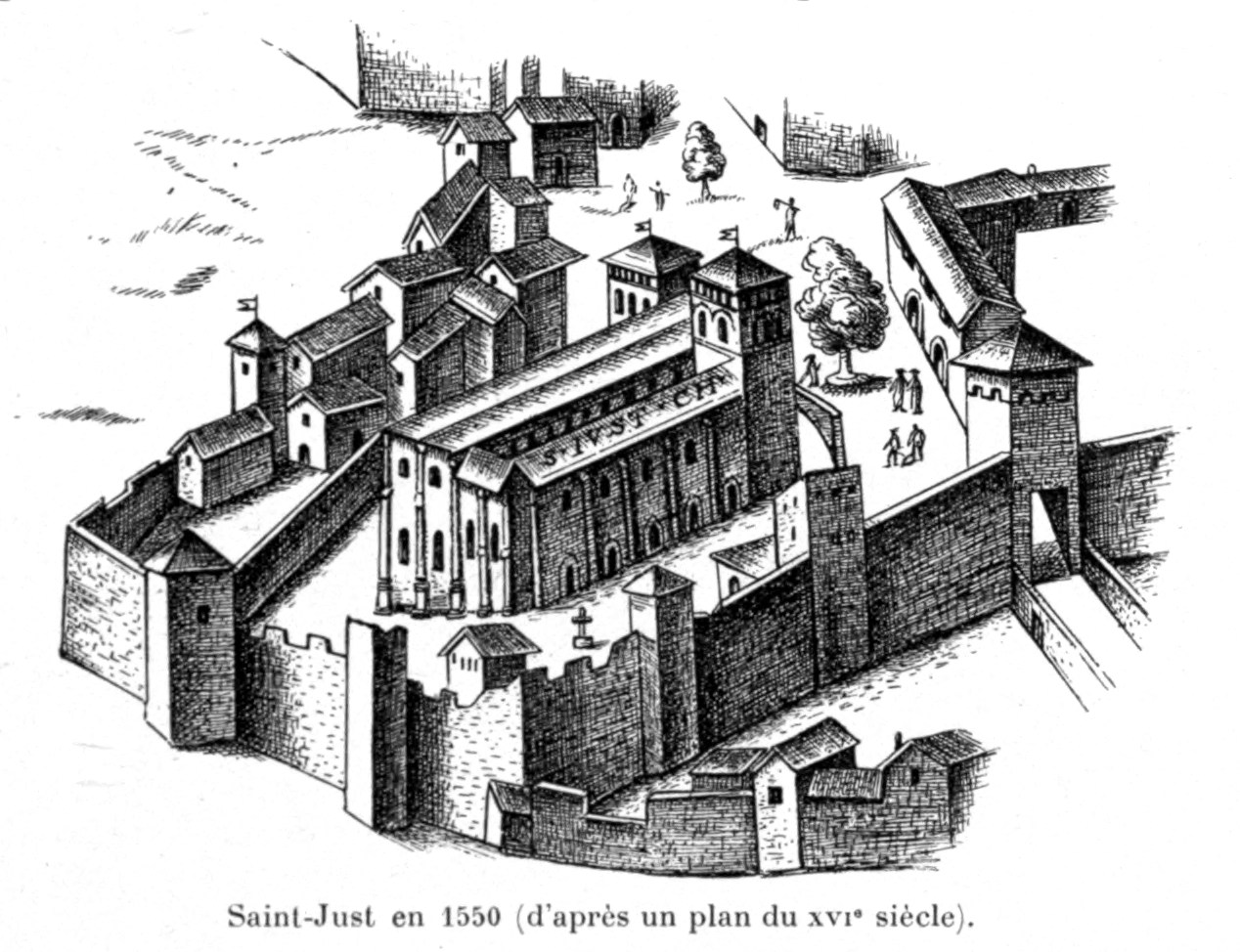
Basilica of St Just in 1550.

The story is told then of a pilgrim in North Africa who some years later recognized Justus and reported this on his return to Lyon. The city folk being eager to regain their bishop, sent a delegation led by Antioch, a priest of Lyon, to find him and bring him back to his diocese. Antioch found but could not convince the hermit Bishop to return, so Antiochus returned to Gaul and was later himself appointed Bishop of Lyon.

Justus died at a monastery of Scetes (present-day Wadi El Natrun) in AD 389. Upon his death, Antiochus now himself Bishop of Lyon made arrangements to repatriate the body of the bishop and that of his companion Viator, who died shortly after, and interred them in the Basilica of the Maccabees, which Antiochus renamed the Saint-Just basilica.

== Veneration and legacy ==
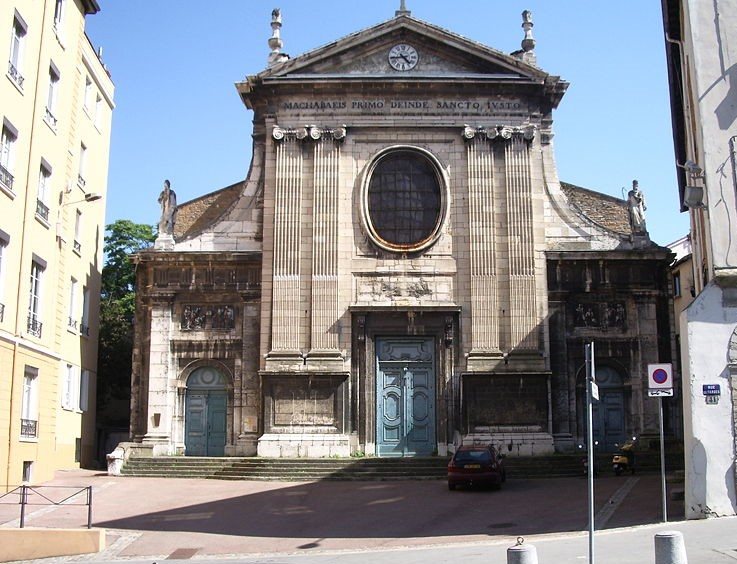
Church of Saint Justus

At the end of the 4th century, a Vita Sancti Justi, Lugdunensis Episcopi, retracing in a hagiographic style the life of Justus, was written by a priest of Lyon.

The Lyon Church celebrates a service for Saint Justus once to four times a year: his ordination on 14 July (also Bastille Day); the translation of his relics to Lyon on August 4; his death on 2 September; and his visit to Egypt on 14 October. The feast of the translation of his relics is still celebrated in the Diocese of Lyon, in addition to the regular September feast, until the twentieth century.

Lyon was founded in 43 BC as the Roman Lugdunum, on the site of a Gallic trading settlement that already had a shrine to the god Lugh. Stephen C. McCluskey says the August festival of Saint Justus, falling so close to the celebration of the harvest festival Lughnasadh, served to reinforce the Christianization of long-standing local traditions, which began with the dedication of the bishop's church to the Maccabees, whose feast day was celebrated on August 1.

In Lyon, the Basilica of Saint Justus, now destroyed was replaced by the Church of Saint-Just. Around the basilica developed a village of the same name which became in the 19th century an arrondissement of Lyon. Saint-Just (pronounced Saint-Ju) is today a quarter in the 5th arrondissement of Lyon, on the Fourvière hill.

The chapel of the school of Tournon (Lycée Gabriel Faure) also bears his name.

== See also ==
- Saint Justus of Lyon, patron saint archive

Catholic Church titles
Preceded by Verissimus	Bishop of Lyon; 374–381	Succeeded by Alpinus
