= Secundian =

Secundian or Secundianus may refer to:

- Secundian, Marcellian and Verian (died 250), Christian saints martyred in 250 AD
- Donatus, Romulus, Secundian, and 86 Companions (died 304), group of Christians who were martyred c. 304 AD
- Secundianus of Singidunum, an Arian bishop of Singidunum deposed at the Council of Aquileia, 381
