= Alpinus of Lyon =

Catholic bishop

Saint Alpinus (Albinus) of Lyon

Bishop of Lyon
- Died: c.400CE
- Venerated in: Roman Catholic Church; Eastern Orthodox Church
- Feast: 15 September

Albin or Alpin (Latin: Alpinus) is the 14th bishop of Lyon who succeeded Saint Just. He is recognized as a Saint by both the Roman Catholic Church. and the Eastern Orthodox Church and is celebrated on 15 September.

== Biography ==
It seems that the name was originally Alpin, quickly softened to Albin by Bede and the martyrologies which succeed him. According to them, Albin succeeds Justus in 390 and was a holy bishop. Tradition assigns him the foundation of the St. Stephen's Church, where he was buried. He died shortly before 400AD.

Catholic Church titles
Preceded by Justus	Bishop of Lyon; 390 – c. 400	Succeeded by Martin
