= Antiochus of Lyon =

Early Bishop of Lyon and Catholic saint

Antiochus, or Antioch or Andéol, was the metropolitan Bishop of Lyon. He died about 410.

He is venerated as a saint in the Catholic Church, with his feast day being 13 August.

== Biography ==
Antiochus was a priest in Lyon, when his bishop Justus of Lyon resigned his see and moved to the Scetic Desert in Egypt to live in a Skete, Antiochus had the desire to see the holy prelate. He therefore embarked at Marseille for Egypt and came to the saint to induce him to return. Justus declined and Antiochus returned to Gaul.

Antioch later became bishop in Lyon during the early 5th century and he arranged to bring the relics of Bishop Justus to Lyon and buried them in the Basilica of the Maccabees, where he himself was later buried.

Catholic Church titles
Preceded by St. Martin	Bishop of Lyon c. 400 – c. 410	Succeeded by Elpidius
