= Basilica of Saint Justus =

Former church in Lyon, France

Coordinates: 45.75°N 4.817°E

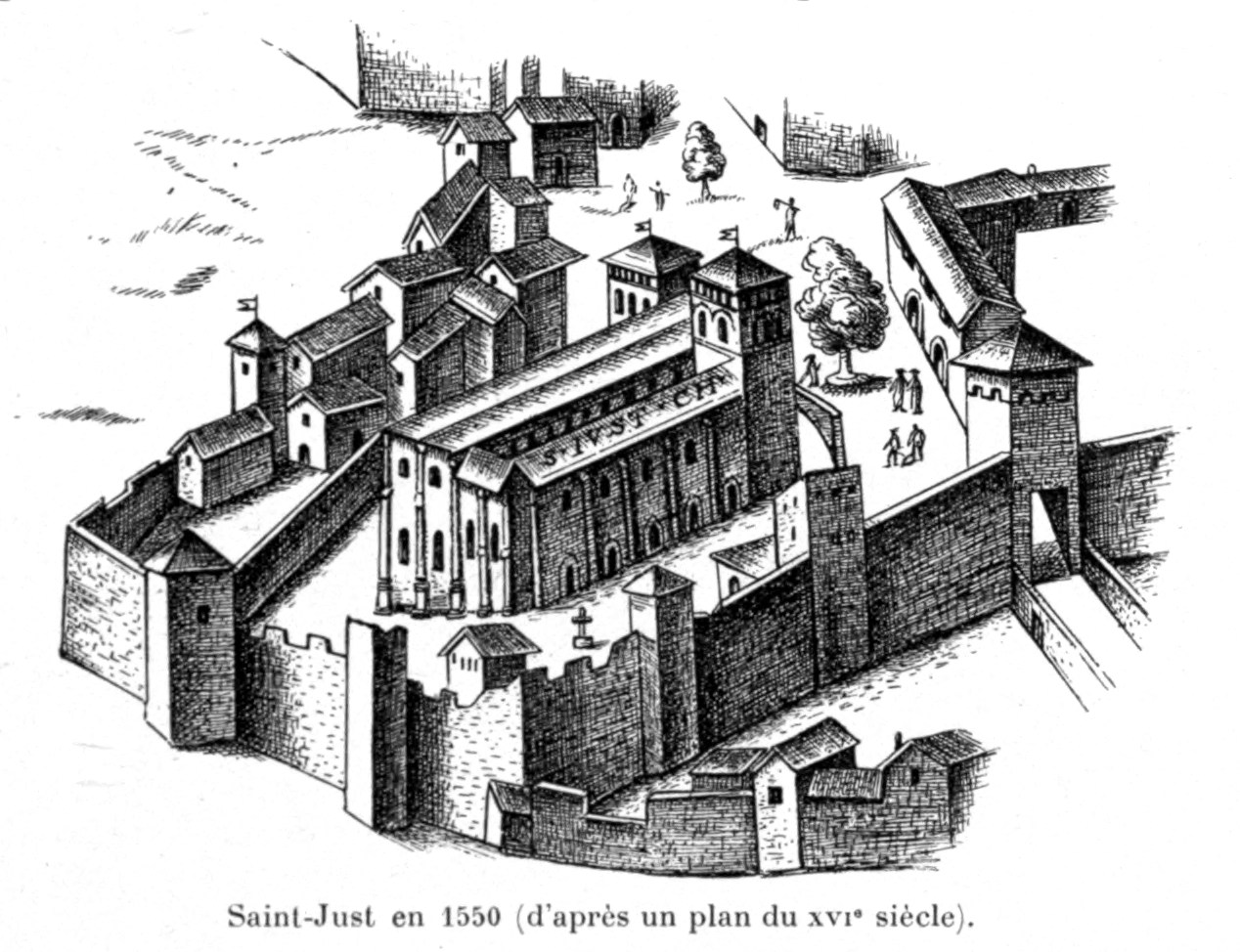
St Justus basilica in 1550.

The Basilica of Saint-Just also known as Saint-Just basilica or the Maccabees Basilica was one of the oldest and most powerful churches in the city of Lyon until it was destroyed during the French Wars of Religion.

It was then rebuilt under the same name but on another site (see Church of Saint-Just).

== History ==
=== Church of the Maccabees ===
A church at Lyon was built sometime before the early fifth century and dedicated to the Maccabees, like that at Vienne. It had once been a Roman mausoleum built on an ancient necropolis southwest of the city of Lugdunum. In the early Christian era, veneration of the tombs of the early Christians led to the construction of a funeral basilica on the sites.

=== Basilica of St. Just ===
Originally dedicated to the Maccabees, the church later was dedicated to Saint-Just, 13th archbishop of Lyon, who died as a hermit in Egypt. His body and that of his disciple Viator were returned to Lyon by his successor Antiochus of Lyon in the early 5th century. A text of the Bishop of Vienne, Adon in the 9th century attests to the name change.

Lyon was founded in 43 BC as the Roman Lugdunum, on the site of a Gallic trading settlement that already had a shrine to the god Lugh. Stephen C. McCluskey says the August feast of St. Justus, falling so close to the celebration of the harvest festival Lughnasadh, served to reinforce the Christianization of long-standing local traditions, which began with the dedication of the bishop's church to the Maccabees, whose feast day was celebrated on August 1. Gregory of Tours details the liturgy of an all night vigil on the eve of the feast of St. Just. This was, however, not only a religious occasion.

Sidonius wrote of a grand ceremony in honor of Saint-Just which would have taken place around 461, and mentions the socializing and games that occurred between the pre-dawn procession and the mid-morning mass.

After the vigil service was over, ...everyone withdrew in various directions, but not far, as we wanted to be present ...when Mass was to be celebrated. ...some of us sat down under the shadow of a full-grow vine whose over-arching foliage made a shady canopy. ...Conversation ensued, pleasant, jesting, bantering, and a specially happy feature in it was that there was no mention of officials or of taxes, no talk that invited betrayal, no informer to betray it; ...we raised a two-fold clamor demanding ...either ball or gaming board, ...Domnicius had seized the dice and was busy shaking them as a sort of trumpet-call summoning the players.(Letter V, 17: 3-11, to Eriphius of Lyon)

=== Middle Ages ===
In the Carolingian period, the church had a chapter of twenty canons which became increasingly important in the life of the city. In the 9th century the church was restored. A fortified monastery and restoration was built in the 12th century which became a collegiate church and the second largest church in the city after the Lyon cathedral. At that time the suburbs of St. Irenaeus and St. Just had a separate wall from that of the city of Lyon.

=== Popes ===
==== Innocent IV ====
It was in the cloister of Saint-Just that Pope Innocent IV resided during the seven years he spent in Lyon between 1244 and 1251. The city of Rome was then in the possession of the Holy Roman Emperor Frederick II, whom Innocent excommunicated at the First Council of Lyon in 1245. Innocent conferred a Golden Rose on the Church of St. Just in recognition of the hospitality extended by the canons to the council. There he received a successor of Frederick, William of Holland. In 1248, he blessed St. Louis and his brothers, as they headed for the seventh crusade.

==== Clement V ====
Clement V, a former vicar-general of the Archdiocese of Lyon, selected Lyon for his coronation on 14 November 1305, which was celebrated with magnificence and attended by Philip IV and the nobility of France and England. During the ceremony, the ancient wall that closed off the choir of the canons collapsed, killing a number of important persons. This was viewed as a divine admonishment.

=== Resident Kings ===
The church also received a visit from Louis XI in 1483, Margaret of Austria 8 December 1490 and of Charles VIII and Anne of Brittany in 1497. The regent Louise of Savoy stayed there for 2 years when her son Francis who had been based in Lyon was held prisoner.

=== Reformation era ===
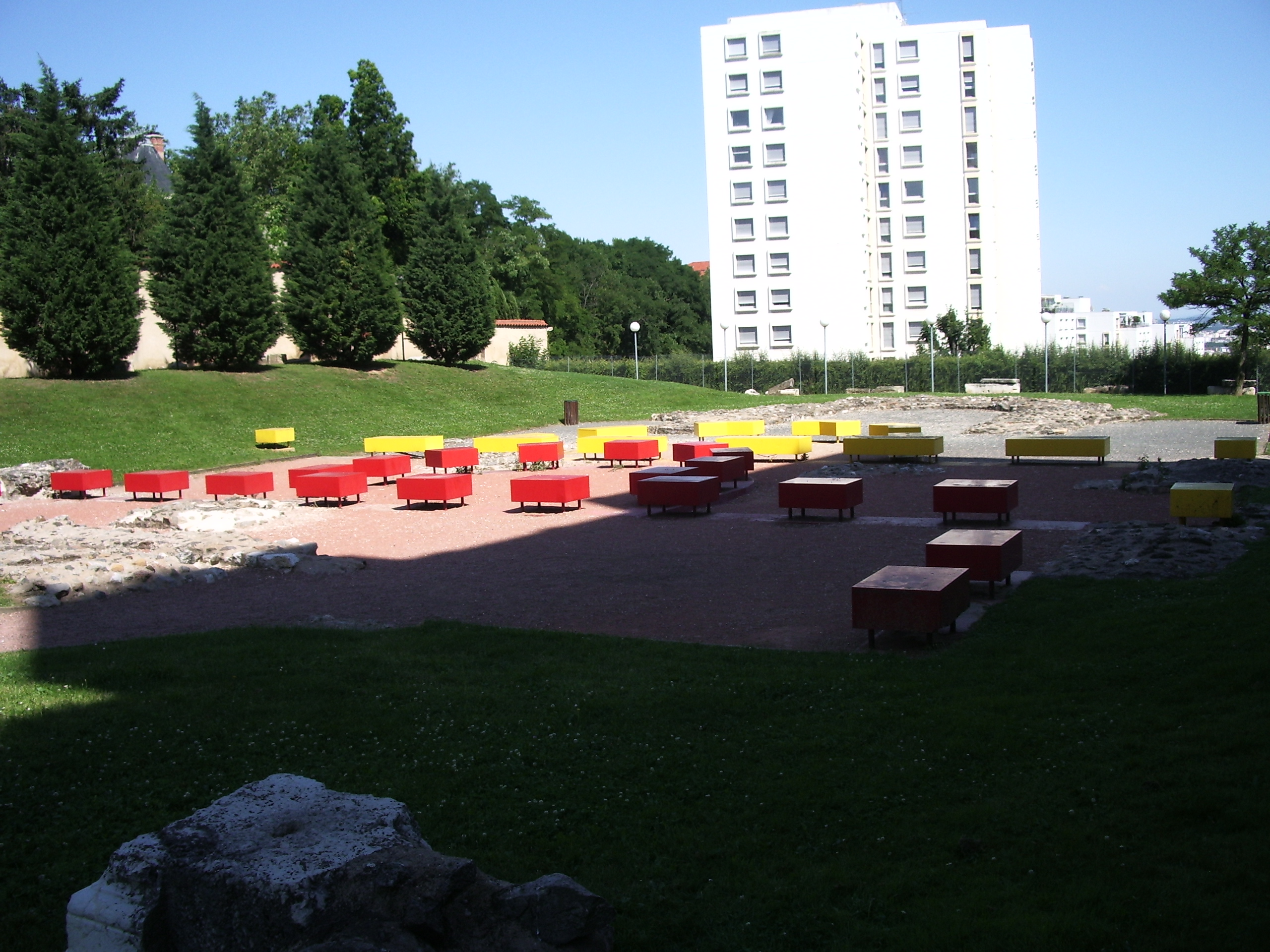
site today

The Protestant troops of Baron Adrets entered Lyon on the night of 30 April 1562 and the suburb of Saint-Just the next day. The basilica was destroyed by Protestants in September 1562. The stones were reused in other buildings, leaving only ruins, while the church was rebuilt on another site. The ruins eventually were lost to history.

=== Rediscovery ===
The remains were finally rediscovered in the 1970s during excavations to build a housing estate. The site of the original Basilica of St. Justus is now the archaeological garden of Saint-Just, rue des Macchabées. The buildings were on 13 Maccabees Street. Archeological excavation were carried out between 1971 and 1974 and then between 1978 and 1980. It was classed as a Historical monument in 1984.
