= Church of Saint-Bruno des Chartreux =

Roman Catholic church in Lyon, France

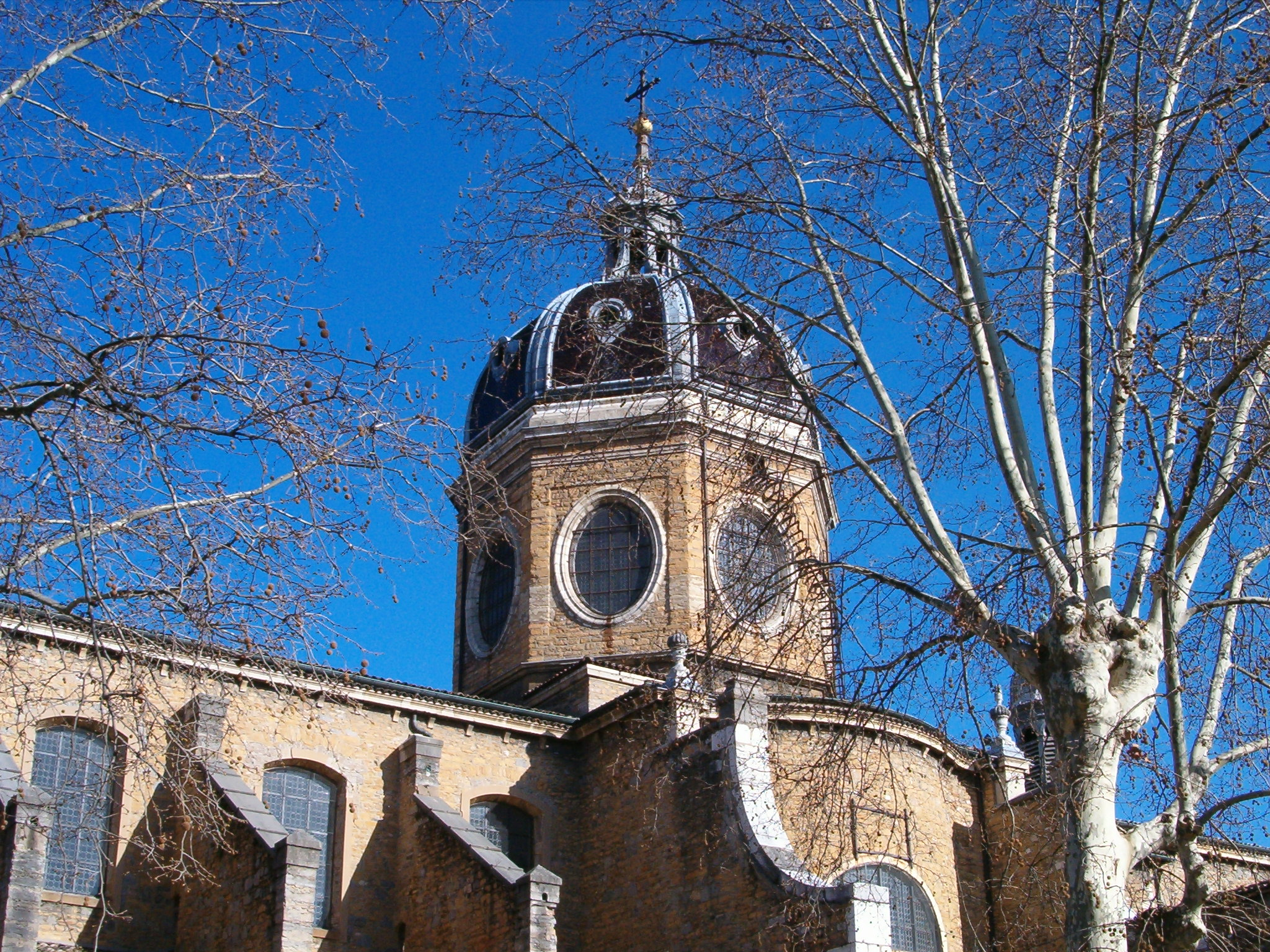
- Exterior of the church
- Church of Saint-Bruno des Chartreux
- 45.771082°N 4.822375°E
- Denomination: Roman Catholic Church

History
- Founded: 1590

Architecture
- Architectural type: church
- Style: Baroque
- Closed: 1750

Administration
- Diocese: Lyon

The Church of Saint-Bruno des Chartreux (French: Église Saint-Bruno des Chartreux, or the Church of Saint Bruno of the Carthusians) is a Roman Catholic church located in Lyon, France. Until the French Revolution, it was the church of Lyon Charterhouse (chartreuse de Lyon). The cathedral is dedicated to Saint Bruno of Cologne, also known as Saint Bruno of the Carthusians, and is the city's only Baroque church.

== History ==
=== Lyon and the Carthusians ===
At the end of the 16th century, the royalty and clergy of France, inspired by the Counter-Reformation, set out on the revival of Roman Catholicism by creating new monasteries and enlarging existing ones. In consequence, the hill of La Croix-Rousse regained the religious use it had in antiquity: from 1584 and over the following century, thirteen religious communities were established on it, giving it the nickname of the "hill that prays" (la colline qui prie), which was later transferred to the other major hill in Lyon, La Fourvière.

The first monastic communities here were established by Carthusian monks from Grenoble, thanks to their good relations with the church in Lyon. They initially came to help the clergy of Lyon when the city was pillaged by Forez Guy in the 12th century and later obtained privileges such as an exemption from tolls on their journeys to Lyon. On a visit by King Henri III in August 1584, however, two Carthusian monks were presented to request him to grant his consent to the foundation of a Carthusian monastery in Lyon. They were successful, and the king also pledged 30,000 livres for its construction (though he never paid them) and chose its name: Chartreuse du Lys St Esprit. In 1589, Henri III died and was succeeded by Henri IV, who declared himself the founder of the Carthusian monastery and confirmed its exemptions and privileges, which were reconfirmed by Louis XIII and Louis XIV.

The Carthusians began by acquiring the Giroflée estate on the banks of the Saône, then extended their lands by purchasing those of their neighbours little by little, until they had a total property of 24 hectares. Contrary to what might be supposed, their extension of their property bore no relation to an expansion in their numbers (they remained at only 28 monks). Instead they related the expansion of their estate to their monastic rule: they were eliminating all their neighbours so as better to live their life of solitary contemplation.

=== Construction of the church ===
It took six years after the king's gift for the first stone of the church to be laid. Its construction was carried out in two phases: the first (1590-1690) included the choir, the small cloister, the sacristy and a few of the monks' cells; the second (in the 18th century) involved the completion of the nave, the transept and the side chapels. Finally, renovations and extensions occurred during the 19th century, mainly affecting the chapels and façade.

== Description ==
=== Choir ===
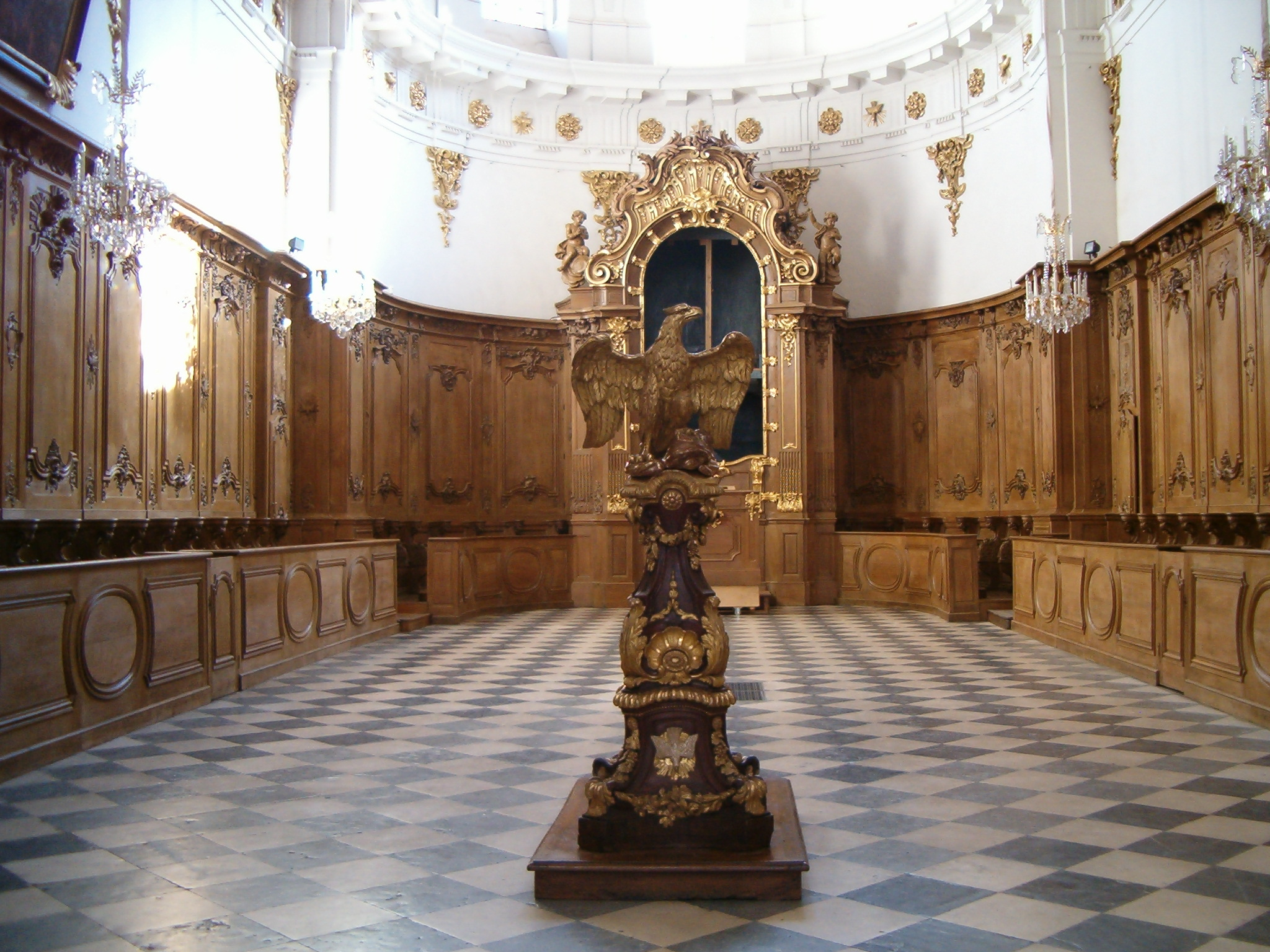
Choir

The choir now has only 5 windows, after several were blocked up during the second phase of works by the architect Ferdinand-Sigismond Delamonce in 1733-37. The Rococo choir stalls found here show reversed volutes and garlands of foliage as well as asymmetrical shells and garlands of flowers.

Typical of the 17th-century Baroque style, the 1628 statues now located on the pilasters of the Munet arch were originally in the choir. They are by Sarazin and represent Saint Bruno of Cologne and Saint John the Baptist. The drapery of these figures is dynamically carved, and their thin faces and tense eyes add to their pathetic expressions.

Today the church organ is also located in the choir, but the church has only had one since 1890, when it became a parish church. It is now known as the best of the double keyboards in Lyon. Before 1890 the austerity of the Carthusian Rule made for an austere liturgy unadorned by organ music.

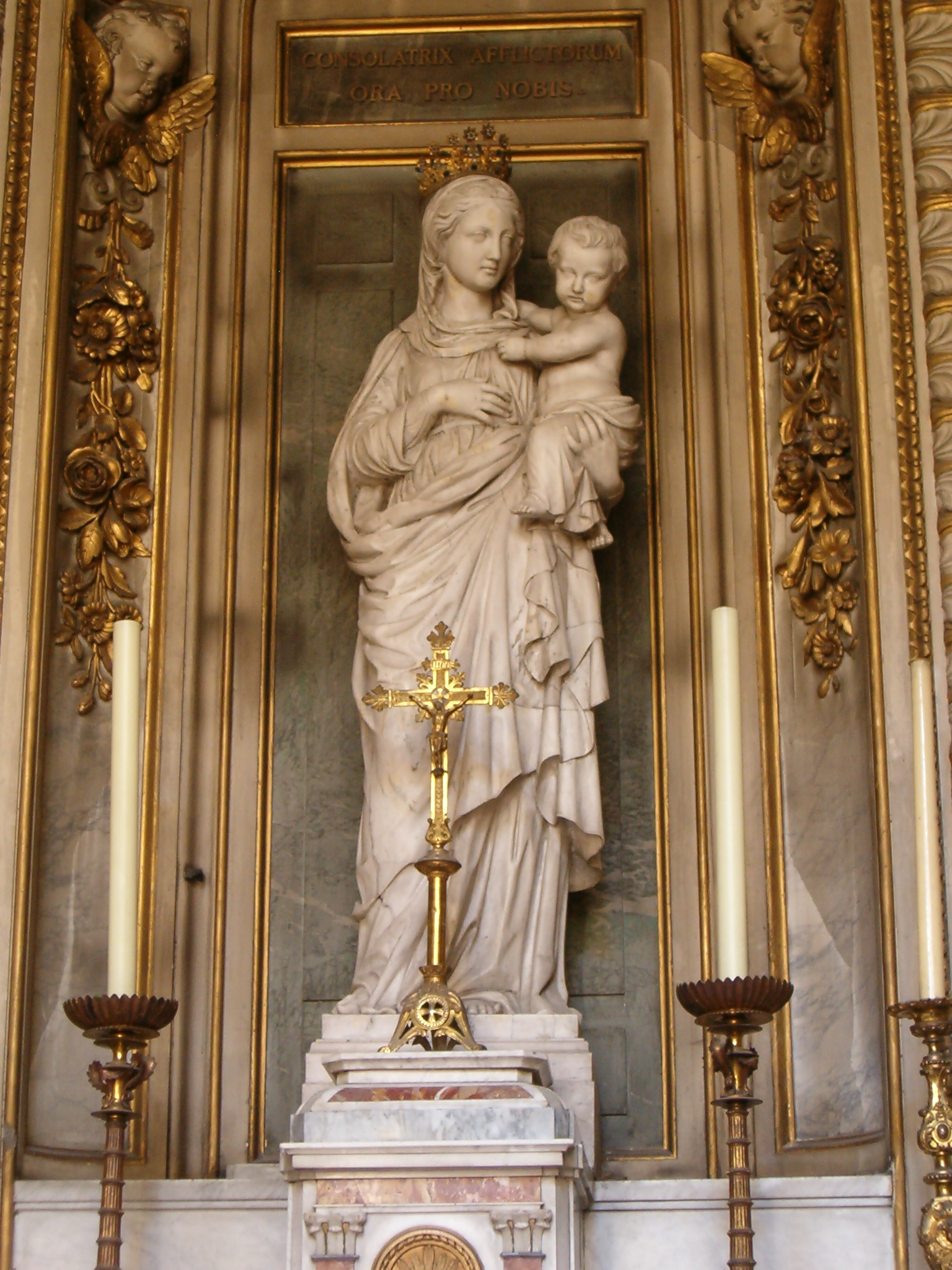
Virgin of the Carthusians, by Joseph-Hugues Fabisch, official sculptor to the Diocese of Lyon

The offices were celebrated in the choir until 1737, when it was separated from the rest of the church for building works by a partition. In the initial plan by the architect Delamonce for his second phase of works, the choir remained separated from the rest of the church but the abbot refused to authorise this plan, and so a second was drawn up and accepted that kept the choir as part of the church.

==== Pulpit ====
Built to hold the book of liturgical chants, the pulpit is in the shape of a spread-eagle (symbol of the Word of God) supported by a column carved with the Eucharistic symbols of grapes and vines, and rooted in a base with the figure of a dove (symbol of the Holy Spirit). It thus unites the three persons of the Holy Trinity.

=== Transept and crossing ===
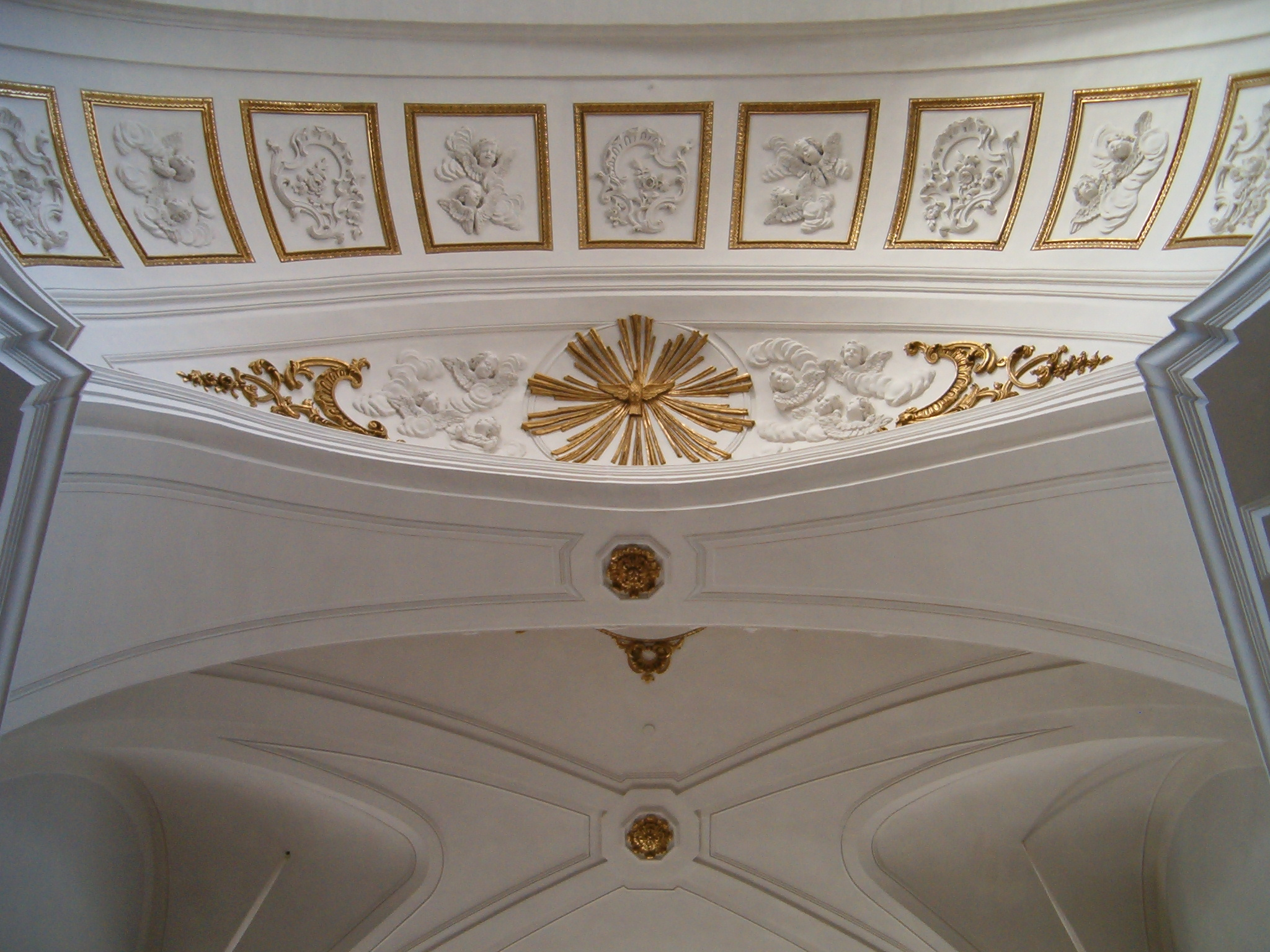
The Munet arch between the choir and the crossing

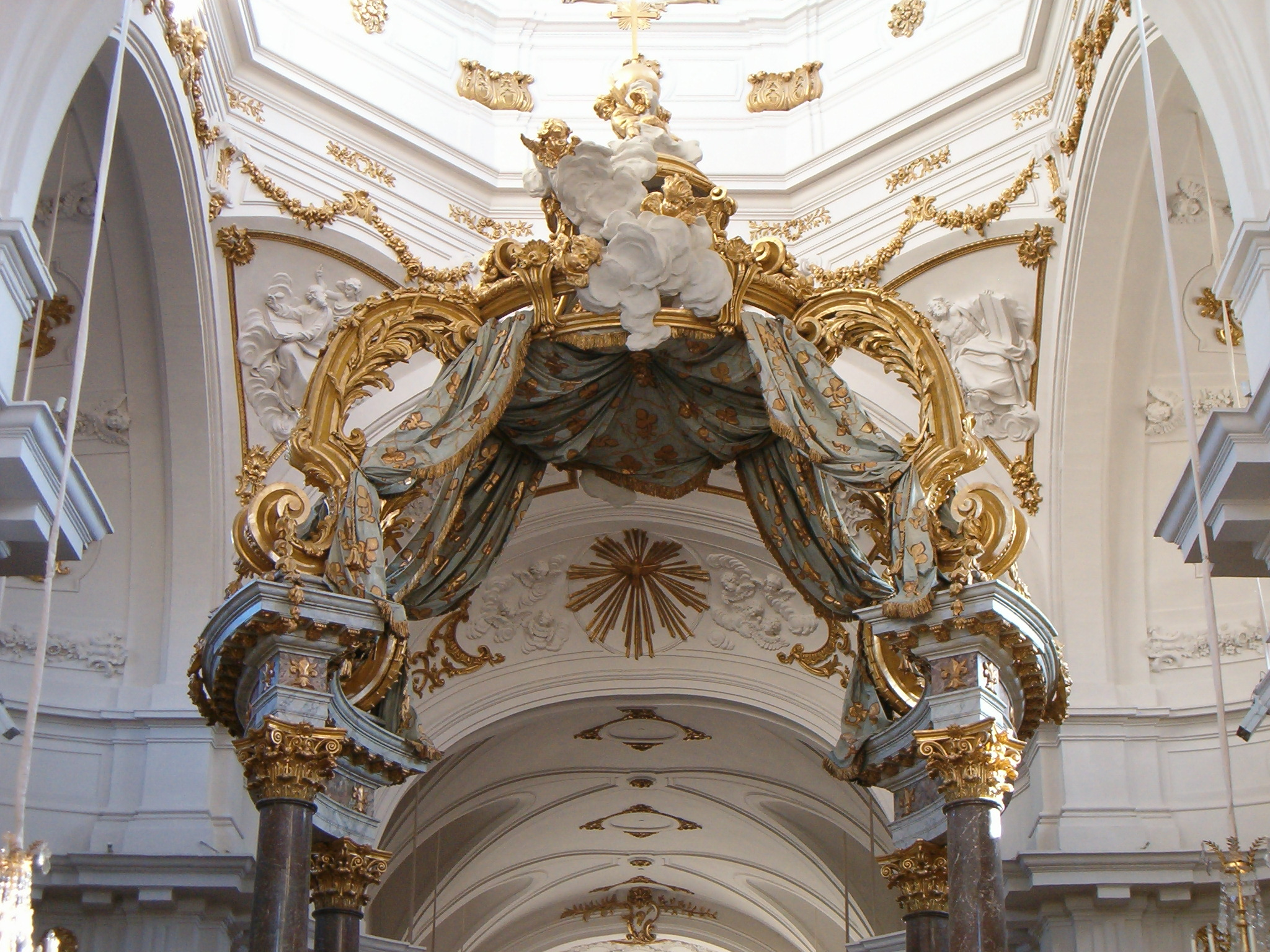
The baldachin by Servandoni

==== Munet arch ====
The transition between the choir and the crossing is formed by the Munet arch, built by the architect Melchior Munet in the 18th century. It is supported by powerful deflecting pillars in the Baroque style. Here there are also two nested pilasters of the Doric Order, whose niches are now occupied by the Sarazin statues.

==== Altar ====
Designed in the 18th century by Servandoni then modified very soon afterwards by Soufflot (known for his work at the Hôtel-Dieu de Lyon and the Panthéon de Paris), the altar is notable for being double-sided, meaning that the office could equally well be celebrated from the monks' side or from the peoples' side.

The tabernacle (i.e., the small cabinet holding the consecrated wafers) was originally decorated with semi-precious stones, but these disappeared during the Revolution.

==== Baldachin ====
The 18th-century baldachin is also by Servandoni. One of the most beautiful examples in France, it aims to magnify the presence of Christ in the Eucharist and in effect to form a hyper-tabernacle around the Host. Its columns are of marble, whilst the capitals are wooden but stuccoed with powdered marble, limestone and powdered chalk to imitate marble. On top of the baldachin are a globe and a cross, both in copper gilded with gold leaf, and drapery made of cloth dipped in liquid plaster and painted gold before drying. The original decoration is unclear: it was long thought that it had been covered in fleurs de lys, which were turned into trefoils, or clover leaves, during the 19th-century renovations. However, more recent renovations found that even before the 19th century the stemless trefoils were there.

==== Dome ====
The crossing dome is made up of 8 oval windows 5 metres high, separated by vaulting and crowned with polygonal decoration. It also has four pendentives whose decoration is inspired by the theme of the Four Evangelists.

=== Nave ===
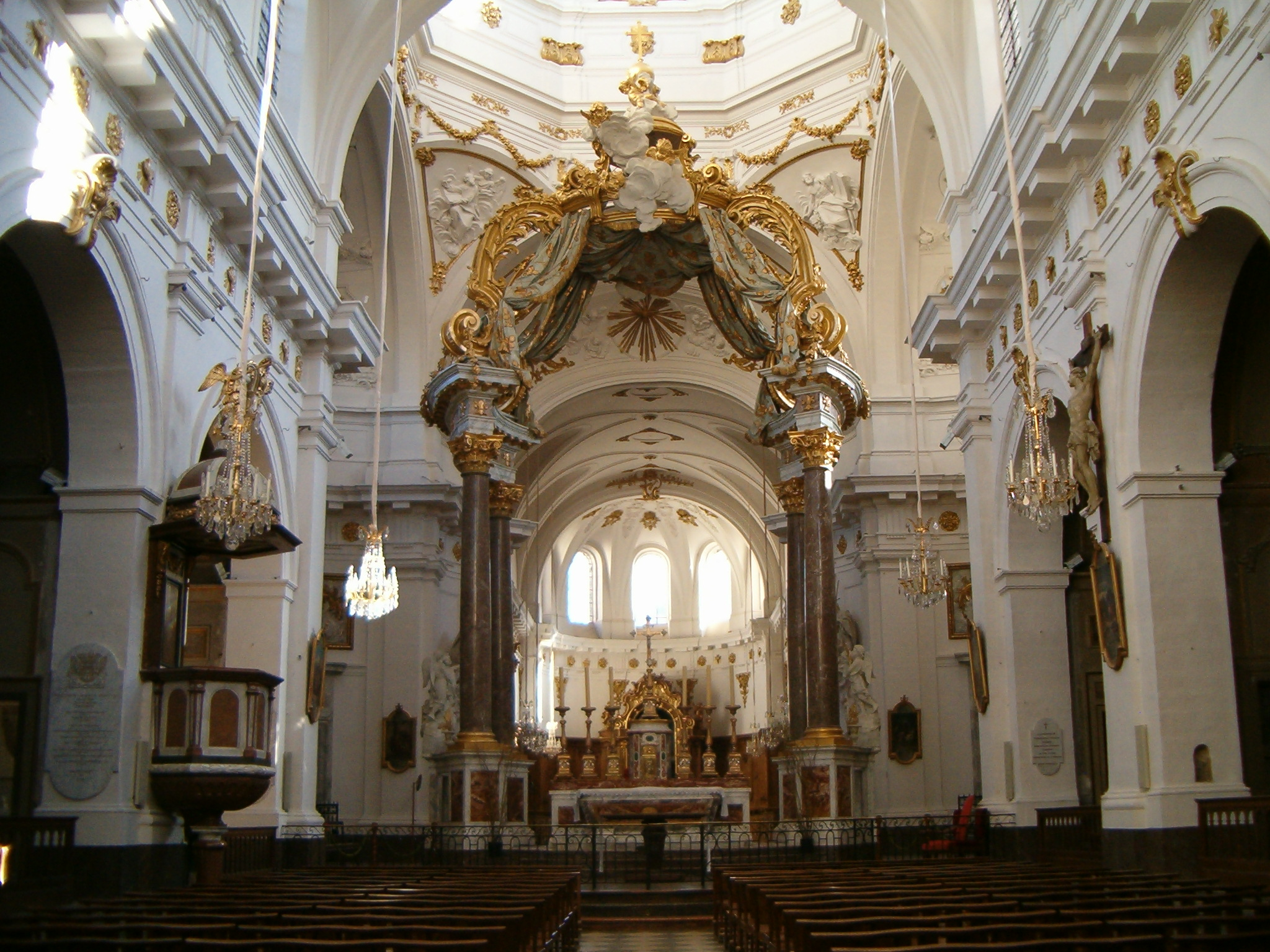
Interior looking east along the nave towards the choir

The decoration of this area contrasts slightly with the rest of the church, being more sober and thus more in keeping with the Carthusian spirit. It was finished in the 18th century.

Its ceiling is decorated with arched vaults and the transition between the walls and ceiling is via a dentillated cornice around the whole church (it was extended round the choir in the 18th century). Under this cornice is a frieze whose metopes alternate between roses and doves (the latter symbolising the Holy Spirit and thus the Carthusians). On either side of the nave are four arcades opening onto side chapels, separated from each other by Doric columns.

==== Side chapels ====
Renovations in the 19th century modified (among other things) the interiors of the eight side chapels. Their altars were effectively reorientated to face the exterior walls rather than the east end, and the windows lighting each chapel were blocked (though traces of them can still be seen on the outside of the nave walls).

=== West front ===
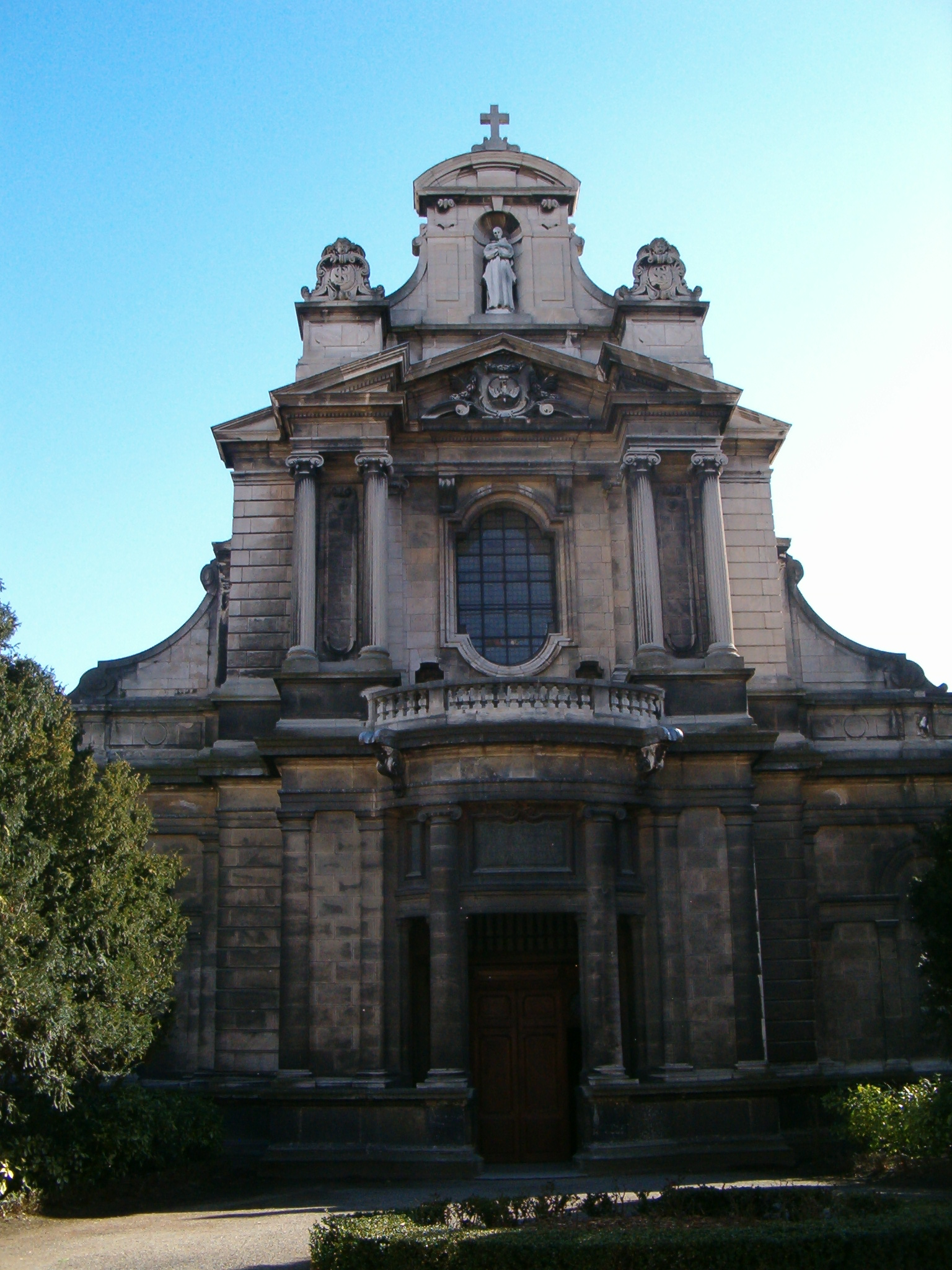
West front

Before 1870, the west front was very sober, and consisted of a flat wall pierced only by a window and a door. When the monastic church became a parish church, Louis-Jean Sainte-Marie Perrin was commissioned to make a new plan for the façade, which he designed to consist of three receding levels, centred symmetrically.

The first of these is the church's entrance porch, bordered by Ionic columns and Doric pilasters. Below the entrance door is a Latin inscription from the Gospel of St Matthew, referring to the subscription among the canuts to finance the works on the façade: "Come to me, all you who are heavy laden, and I will give you rest". The second level is a curvilinear balcony with a small terrace, above which is the window (the only surviving element of the original west front) surrounded by four fluted columns and a triangular pediment with the symbol of the Holy Spirit. The third level contains a niche with a statue of Saint Bruno between the initials S. B.

=== Dome ===
On the dome are 8 bays, each with one of the 8 interior windows below it. The dome's exterior is made of stone and serves to hide the internal structure of the dome far below it. On top of it is a lantern surmounted by a cross on a globe in lead, symbol of the Carthusians. In all the dome measures 10m high and 39m in circumference.
