= Saint Sicarius =

Saint Sicarius (French: Sicaire) may refer to a number of figures in Christian tradition:

- Sicarius of Autun (Sicaire d’Autun or Siacre), 600 AD. Archbishop of Autun. Feast day: August 27.
- Sicarius of Bassens (Sicaire de Bassens). His tomb can be found in the church of Saint-Pierre de Bassens; he is venerated locally in Gironde but never seems to have been formally canonized, indicating a very early cult.
- Sicarius of Brantôme or Sicarius of Bethlehem (Sicaire de Brantôme, Sicaire de Bethléem), child saint whom tradition makes one of the victims of the Massacre of the Innocents. Charlemagne had his relics brought to the abbey of Saint-Pierre de Brantôme. Pope Clement III canonized Sicarius. A spring bears his name. Feast day: May 1 or May 2

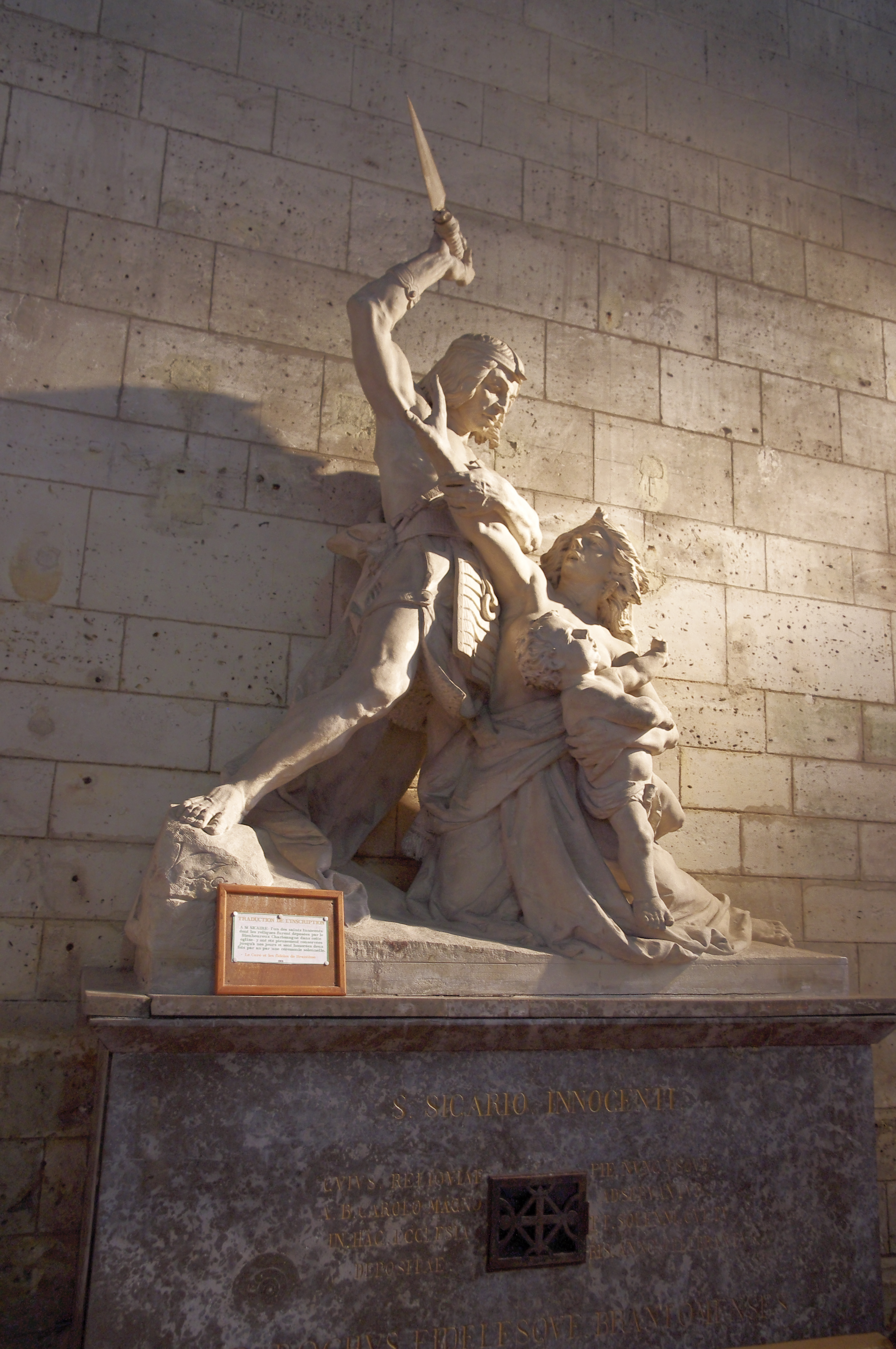
Sculpture representing the martyrdom of Saint Sicarius, Brantôme

- Sicarius of Lyon (Sicard, Sicarius, Sacario), died c. 433 or 435 AD. He was an archbishop of Lyon. Feast day: March 26. However, his existence has been in dispute since the 18th century; it is possible that he is the namesake of the Italian frazione of Sansicario
- Sicarius of Nice (Siacre, in Latin Siacrius or Sicarius) 777–781 AD. Feast day: May 23.

== Saint Sicaria of Orleans ==
- Sicaria of Orleans (Sicaire d’Orléans), virgin saint, 500 AD. Feast day: February 2 or February 3.
