= Palladius of Ratiaria =

Palladius of Ratiaria (modern Archar Bulgaria) was a late 4th century Arian Christian theologian, based in the Roman province of Dacia in modern Romania.

He was deposed from his office, together with Secundianus of Singidunum, at the Council of Aquileia, held in 381 AD.

The Council of Aquileia in 381 AD was a church synod which was part of the struggle between Arian and orthodox ideas in Christianity. It was one of five councils of Aquileia.

Palladius had applied to the Emperor of the East for an opportunity to clear himself before a general council of these charges concerning the nature of Christ. Palladius was unwilling to submit to a council of the Western bishops only, for Ambrose had previously assured the Emperor of the West that such a matter as the soundness or heresy of just two bishops might be settled by a council simply consisting of the bishops of the Diocese of Italy alone. Politics and Christology were inextricably entangled in the 4th century: "You have contrived, as appears by the sacred document (Gratian's amended convocation) which you have brought forward, that this should not be a full and General Council: in the absence of our Colleagues we cannot answer", was Palladius' stand.

Ambrose proposed that Arius' letter from Nicomedia to Alexander, bishop of Alexandria, should be read in detail, and Palladius be called upon to defend or condemn each heretical proposition that disputed Catholic orthodoxy. Arius had said that the Father alone is eternal; the Catholics insisted that the Son was co-eternal. Palladius quoted Scripture, which Ambrose skirted. Ambrose rested upon the verbal formulas recently agreed upon by authority of the Church, while Palladius refused to admit the legitimacy of the proceedings. The other bishops unanimously pronounced anathema on all counts, and the matter was settled. Of Palladius it is said by Vigilius, a late 5th century bishop of Thapsus in Africa, that after Ambrose's death (397), he wrote a reply to Ambrose's writings against Arianism, which Vigilius in turn wrote to counter.

== See also ==
- Roman Dacia
- Dacia Ripensis
- Dacia
