= Ferdinand-Sigismond Delamonce =

French architect

Ferdinand-Sigismond Delamonce (1678 in Munich – 1753 in Lyon) was an architect of French ancestry born in the Electorate of Bavaria to the architect Jean Delamonce. He worked with his father until the latter's death in 1708 and then worked alone in Italy (1715–28) before arriving in Lyon in 1731. There he headed works on the Carthusian monastery in the city (1733–37).

== Sources ==
- Bénézit, Emmanuel (1924). "Delamonce (Ferdinand-Pierre-Joseph-Ignace)". Dictionnaire critique et documentaire des peintres, sculpteurs, dessinateurs & graveurs de tous les temps et de tous les pays. Vol. 2. Paris: Gründ. p. 57.
