= Secundianus of Singidunum =

Secundianus of Singidunum (fl. 381) was bishop of Singidunum (in the Roman province of Dacia, modern Belgrade). Little is known of his life; except that he was condemned for heresy at the Council of Aquileia (in the northeast of modern Italy) in 381.

Palladius of Ratiaria (province of Dacia, modern Bulgaria) had been assured by Gratian, the senior Roman emperor, that several bishops from the Eastern Empire, a stronghold of Arianism, would attend the Council. He had been deceived. Saint Ambrose had persuaded Gratian to change its original purpose. Palladius and his friend Secundianus were outnumbered at Aquileia by thirty-four to two, and found themselves on trial. The charge against them was that they believed God the Son to be subordinate to God the Father; instead of being of equal rank, as stipulated in the Nicene Creed of 325. (Note: The Nicene Creed says, "Jesus Christ, the Son of God [...] being of one substance with the Father".)

From the Council, Ambrose wrote to Gratian:

No heretical bishops were found to be present except Palladius and Secundianus, men long notorious for their perfidy, on whose account people from the ends of the Roman world were asking that a council should be convened. [...] Although they were convicted of misrepresentation and made to admit it, they refused to listen to reason. [...] We are horrified, most gracious princes, (Note: The letter was nominally addressed to all three emperors: Gratian, Valentinian and Theodosius.) at sacrilege so terrible and teachers so depraved; and to prevent their peoples being any further deceived, we came to the conclusion that they ought to be deposed from their priesthood[.] [...] We beg you, out of regard for your own faith and honour, to show respect for the Author of your empire, and, by the letter of your Grace to the competent authorities, to decree that these champions of impiety be debarred from the threshold of the Church, and that holy bishops be put in the place of the condemned by the representatives of our humble selves.

No record of what action Gratian took seems to have survived; but it seems likely that if he had taken none, Ambrose would have sent a reminder.
