= History of papal primacy =

History of the papacy and dogmatism

The historical roots of papal primacy can be traced back to the early centuries of Christianity, wherein the bishop of Rome, commonly referred to as the Pope, gradually accrued increasing authority and recognition. A confluence of historical, theological, and political factors contributed to this development.

Some earliest references to the primacy of the bishop of Rome can be found in the writings of renowned Christian figures such as Ignatius of Antioch and Irenaeus of Lyon. In their writings, these Church Fathers recognized the unique position of the church in Rome, which was believed to have been founded by Peter and Paul. Therefore, the bishop of Rome was regarded as the successor of Peter, who, in accordance with the New Testament, was designated by Jesus as the leader of his church.

In addition, given the city's political and cultural importance as the capital of the empire, the growing Christianization of the Roman Empire further strengthened the bishop of Rome's authority. During the Council of Nicaea in 325, the bishop of Rome was specifically recognized as having special authority, and subsequent ecumenical councils like Constantinople I (381) and Chalcedon (451), affirmed the bishop of Rome as the first among equals among the church's patriarchs.

== Background ==
In Roman Catholic teaching, Jesus's words in Matthew 16:18 to Peter, "You are Peter, and on this rock I will build my Church, and I will give you the keys of the kingdom of heaven," are understood to give the apostles real governing and teaching authority, with Peter singled out for leadership. Through the appointment and consecration of new bishops, the apostles handed that office to successors, creating an unbroken chain of leadership from the first century onward. This continuous handover of office is called apostolic succession. Within that succession, Peter’s unique role is seen to continue in the bishop of Rome, the Pope, who is regarded as Peter's successor and a visible point of unity for the Church.

=== Primacy of Peter the Apostle ===
According to numerous records of the early Church Fathers, Peter was present in Rome, was martyred there, and was the first bishop of Rome. Dogma and traditions of the Catholic Church maintain that he served as the bishop of Rome for 25 years until 67 AD when he was martyred by Nero (further information: Great Fire of Rome). The official Catholic position, as Eamon Duffy points out in his book Saints and Sinners: A History of the Popes (2015), is that Jesus had essentially appointed Peter as the first pope.

Many Catholic and non-Catholic exegetes identify broad agreement that the New Testament portrays Saint Peter as leader of the Twelve and of the earliest Jerusalem community, a role understood as conferred by Jesus and attested not only in the classic Petrine passages (Matt 16:13–19; Luke 22:31–34; John 21:15–17) but also in texts such as 1 Corinthians 15:5, which presents Peter as first witness to the resurrection.

The strongest pro-Petrine witnesses were written after Peter’s death, indicating the early Church's sustained interest in his person and function and treating him as a reliable guarantor of the Jesus tradition.

Whether the New Testament envisages an office that endures beyond Peter’s lifetime remains disputed, and many scholars judge that the texts, on strictly historical grounds which do not clearly articulate a doctrine of successors for Peter.

=== Apostolic succession ===
In the earliest Christian communities, Peter is often understood to have exercised a special authority, but in collegial partnership with other leaders. He is not presented as a spiritual monarch or sole ruler, and there is no indication of exclusive jurisdiction.

According to Catholic author Stephen K. Ray (1999), several Church Fathers, including Cyprian of Carthage and Irenaeus of Lyons, disagreed with Rome on theological or disciplinary matters but did not deny Rome’s primacy. In his view, debates concerned the scope and practical exercise of that primacy rather than its existence.

Whether a single bishop presided in Rome in the late first century is disputed. Many scholars infer a collegial leadership of presbyters, from which a presider or "first among equals" later emerged and was retrospectively described as “bishop” after the mid-second century, especially during instances where local leaders had been deposed in an internal dispute.

==== 1 Clement and Roman intervention ====
1 Clement, commonly dated to about 95 AD, is often cited as the earliest extant text in which Rome addresses the internal affairs of another Christian community (Church of Corinth). The letter itself names the Roman congregation as the sender rather than an individual author. The epistle's tone is authoritative with it asking for order, humility, and submission to duly appointed ministers, and advises against ambition and arrogance.

==== Second-century succession lists ====
In his five-volume work "Memoirs " (Hypomnemata), composed between c. 170–180 AD, the chronicler Hegesippus documented an episcopal list identifying Clement as the third bishop of Rome in direct succession.

Irenaeus compiled a list of succession of the bishops of Rome, including the immediate successors of Peter and Paul: Linus, Anacleutus, Clement, Evaristus, Alexander, and Sixtus. The Catholic Church currently considers these the successors of Peter, whom they consider the first pope, and through whom following popes would claim authority. However, modern scholarship holds his views as constructed after the fact.

The evolution of earlier tradition established both Peter and Paul as the forefathers of the bishops of Rome, from whom they received their position as chief shepherd (Peter) and supreme authority on doctrine (Paul).

To establish her primacy among the churches of the Western half of the empire, the bishops of Rome relied on a letter written in 416 AD by Innocent I to the Bishop of Gubbio, to show how subordination to Rome had been established. The argument is that Peter alone (with no mention of Paul) was the only apostle to have worked in the West, and that the churches in Italy, Spain, Gaul, Sicily, Africa, and the Western islands were founded through bishops appointed by Peter or his successors. On this basis, it concludes that all congregations had to abide by the regulations set in Rome.

== Origins and development of episcopacy ==
This development is often explained as a response to problems of church unity. To address divisions arising from heterodox teaching, churches adopted more standardized structures of ministry. One such structure was the tri-partite form of leadership consisting of episkopoi (overseers), presbyteroi (elders, as in Jewish communities), and diakonoi (ministerial servants).

Presbyters were ordained and assisted the bishop; as Christianity spread, especially in rural areas, presbyters assumed greater responsibilities and took distinctive shape as priests. Deacons also performed specific duties, such as tending to the poor and the sick. The Didache, dated to c. AD 70–140, exhorts, “Appoint for yourselves therefore bishops and deacons worthy of the Lord.”

Catholic theologian Francis A. Sullivan agrees with a broad scholarly consensus that the available evidence indicates the church of Rome was led by a college of presbyters, rather than a single bishop, for at least several decades of the second century. Professor of Biblical Theology Robert L. Williams similarly argues that the origin and earliest development of episcopacy, monoepiscopacy, and the ecclesiastical concept of apostolic succession were associated with crisis situations in the early church.

Over the course of the second century, this organizational structure became widespread and continues in the Catholic, Orthodox, and Anglican churches, as well as in some Protestant denominations. Further elements of hierarchical relationship appear in Clement of Alexandria’s Stromateis, which describes the grades of bishops, presbyters, and deacons as imitations of angelic glory and of the divine economy promised to those who follow the apostles’ footsteps in righteousness according to the Gospel. A shift to a monarchical episcopate happened around early-third century.

== Rome's role as arbiter ==
This passage in Irenaeus (from Against Heresies 3:4:1) illuminates the meaning of his remarks about the Church of Rome: if there are disputes in a local church, that church should have recourse to the Roman Church, for there is contained the Tradition which is preserved by all the churches. Rome's vocation [in the pre-Nicene period] consisted in playing the part of arbiter, settling contentious issues by witnessing to the truth or falsity of whatever doctrine was put before them. Rome was truly the center where all converged if they wanted their doctrine to be accepted by the conscience of the Church. They could not count upon success except on one condition, that the Church of Rome had received their doctrine. And refusal from Rome predetermined the attitude the other churches would adopt. There are numerous cases of this recourse to Rome...

— Nicholas Afanassieff, The Primacy of Peter (c. 1992)

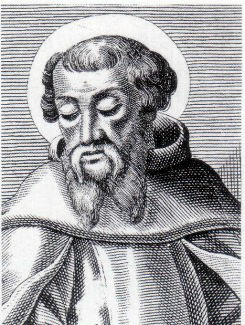
Irenaeus compiled a list of papal succession, including the immediate successors of Peter and Paul

=== Stephen I ===
In the aftermath of the Decian persecution there were disagreements regarding how to deal with those who had lapsed; whether and under what conditions might they be readmitted to the Christian community. At the behest of Faustinus of Lyon and other bishops of Gaul, Cyprian of Carthage wrote Pope Stephen I (254-257) asking him to instruct the bishops of Gaul to condemn Marcianus of Arles (who refused to admit those who repented) and to elect another bishop in his stead. In 250, St. Cyprian and Firmilian both wrote of the Bishop of Rome as successor of Peter, and the latter mentions how the Bishop of Rome decreed policy for other regions based on this succession.

=== Damasus I ===
In 376, Jerome was living as an ascetic in the desert of Chalcis, south-west of Antioch. Pope Damasus I had asked him to make a new translation of scripture. At that time there were rival claimants for the See of Antioch, and Jerome wrote Pope Damasus I to ask who was the true bishop of the three claimants of the see of Antioch, and for clarification of a doctrinal issue:

Yet, though your greatness terrifies me, your kindness attracts me. From the priest I demand the safe-keeping of the victim, from the shepherd the protection due to the sheep. ...My words are spoken to the successor of the fisherman, to the disciple of the cross. As I follow no leader save Christ, so I communicate with none but your blessedness, that is with the chair of Peter. For this, I know, is the rock on which the church is built! This is the house where alone the paschal lamb can be rightly eaten. This is the ark of Noah, and he who is not found in it shall perish when the flood prevails. But since by reason of my sins I have betaken myself to this desert which lies between Syria and the uncivilized waste, I cannot, owing to the great distance between us, always ask of your sanctity the holy thing of the Lord. ...He that gathers not with you scatters; he that is not of Christ is of Antichrist.

In 382 Jerome accompanied one of the claimants, Paulinus II of Antioch, to Rome, where Pope Damasus I (366-384) had convened a council to determine a canonical list of scripture. (Jerome then served as confidential secretary to the Pope for the next three years before heading to Bethlehem.)

By 650 AD, the See of Rome consolidated its position as a center of authority within the Western Church. It increasingly assumed the role of a final arbiter in legal matters, with individuals appealing to its court for resolution of disputes. Decisions issued from Rome held significant weight, carrying an authority nearly equal to pronouncements from universal church councils.

== After the Edict of Milan ==
=== Decretals ===
The bishops of Rome sent letters which, though largely ineffectual, provided historical precedents which were used by later supporters of papal primacy. These letters were known as "decretals" from at least the time of Pope Siricius (384-399) to Leo I. They provided general guidelines to follow which later would become incorporated into canon law. Thus it was "this attempt to implement the authority of the bishop of Rome, or at least the claim of authority, to lands outside Italy, which allows us to use the word 'pope' for bishops starting with Damasus (366-384) or Siricius." Pope Siricius declared that no bishop could take office without his knowledge. Not until Pope Symmachus would a bishop of Rome presume to bestow a pallium (woolen garment worn by a bishop) on someone outside Italy.

=== Optatus ===
Optatus clearly believed in a "Chair of Peter", calling it a gift of the church and saying, as summarized by Henry Wace, that "Parmenian must be aware that the episcopal chair was conferred from the beginning on Peter, the chief of the apostles, that unity might be preserved among the rest and no one apostle set up a rival." "You cannot deny that you are aware that in the city of Rome the episcopal chair was given first to Peter, the chair in which Peter sat, the same who was head—that is why he is also called Cephas—of all the Apostles; the one chair in which unity is maintained by all. Neither do other Apostles proceed individually on their own; and anyone who would set up another chair in opposition to that single chair would, by that very fact, be a schismatic and a sinner."

=== Bishop of Rome becomes rector of the whole church ===
The power of the bishop of Rome increased as the imperial power of the emperor declined. Edicts of Emperors Theodosius II and Valentinian III proclaimed the Roman bishop "as Rector of the whole Church." The Emperor Justinian, who was living in the East in Constantinople, in the 6th century published a similar decree. These proclamations did not create the office of the pope, but from the 6th century onward the bishop of Rome's power and prestige increased so dramatically that the title of "pope" (from greek pappàs, "father") began to fit the bishop of Rome best.

=== First Council of Constantinople ===
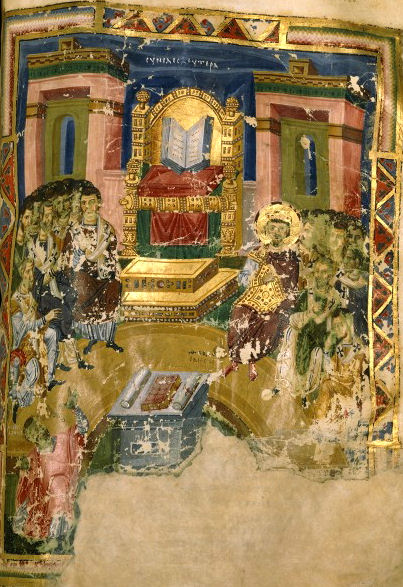
Early manuscript illustration of Council of Constantinople

The event that is often considered to have been the first conflict between Rome and Constantinople was triggered by the elevation of the see of Constantinople to a position of honour second only to Rome, on the grounds that as capital of the eastern Roman empire it was now the "New Rome". This was promulgated in the First Council of Constantinople (381) canon 3 which decreed: "The Bishop of Constantinople, however, shall have the prerogative of honour after the Bishop of Rome because Constantinople is the New Rome." At the Council of Rome, a synod held in the following year, 382, Pope Damasus I protested against this raising of the bishop of the new imperial capital, just fifty years old, to a status higher than that of the bishops of Alexandria and Antioch. In opposition to this view, Francis Dvornik asserts that not only did Damasus offer "no protest against the elevation of Constantinople", that change in the primacy of the major sees was effected in an "altogether friendly atmosphere". According to Dvornik, "Everyone continued to regard the Bishop of Rome as the first bishop of the Empire, and the head of the church." Thomas Shahan says that, according to Photius, Pope Damasus approved the council of Constantinople, but he adds that, if any part of the council were approved by this pope, it could have been only its revision of the Nicene Creed, as was the case also when Gregory the Great recognized it as one of the four general councils, but only in its dogmatic utterances.

The first documented use of the description of Peter as first bishop of Rome, rather than as the apostle who commissioned its first bishop, dates from 354, and the phrase "the Apostolic See", which refers to the same apostle, began to be used exclusively of the see of Rome, a usage found also in the Acts of the Council of Chalcedon. From the time of Pope Damasus I, the text of Matthew 16:18 ("You are Peter and on this rock I will build my church") is used to support Roman primacy.

Pope Innocent I (401–417) claimed that all major cases should be reserved to the see of Rome and wrote: "All must preserve that which Peter the prince of the apostles delivered to the church at Rome and which it has watched over until now, and nothing may be added or introduced that lacks this authority or that derives its pattern from somewhere else." Pope Boniface I (418–422) stated that the church of Rome stood to the churches throughout the world "as the head to the members", a statement that was repeated by the delegates of Pope Leo I to the Council of Chalcedon in 451. (Note: "Paschasinus, the most reverend bishop and legate of the Apostolic See, stood up in the midst with his most reverend colleagues and said: We received directions at the hands of the most blessed and apostolic bishop of the Roman city, which is the head of all the churches, ...")

=== Relationship with bishops of other cities ===
The increasing involvement of Eastern emperors in church matters and the advancement of the see of Constantinople over the sees of Antioch, Alexandria and Jerusalem led successive bishops of Rome to attempt a sharper definition of their ecclesial position vis-a-vis the other bishops.

Rome was not the only city that could claim a special role in Christ's church. Jerusalem had the prestige of being the city of Christ's death and resurrection, the location of the first church and an important church council of the 1st century. Antioch was the place where Jesus' followers were first called "Christians" (as well as "Catholic") and was the first church that St Peter had founded. Alexandria, was also an important early center of Christian thought. All three main apostolic sees of the early Church (i.e. Antioch, Alexandria, and Rome) claimed an origin related to Peter, hence the term Petrine Sees. Prior to holding the position of Bishop of Rome, Peter was the Bishop of Antioch. And his disciple, Mark the Evangelist, founded the church in Alexandria. Constantinople became highly important after Constantine moved his capital there in 330 AD.

It was not until 440 that Leo the Great more clearly articulated the extension of papal authority as doctrine, promulgating in edicts and in councils his right to exert "the full range of apostolic powers that Jesus had first bestowed on the apostle Peter". It was at the Ecumenical Council of Chalcedon in 451 that Leo I (through his emissaries) stated that he was "speaking with the voice of Peter". At this same Council, an attempt at compromise was made when the bishop of Constantinople was given a primacy of honour only second to that of the bishop of Rome, because "Constantinople is the New Rome". Roman papal authorities rejected this language since it did not clearly recognize Rome's claim to juridical authority over the other churches.

=== Leo I ===
In line with the norm of Roman law that a person's legal rights and duties passed to his heir, Pope Leo (440–461) taught that he, as Peter's representative, succeeded to the power and authority of Peter, and he implied that it was through Peter that the other apostles received from Christ strength and stability. Pope Gelasius I (492–496) stated: "The see of blessed Peter the Apostle has the right to unbind what has been bound by sentences of any pontiffs whatever, in that it has the right to judge the whole church. Neither is it lawful for anyone to judge its judgment, seeing that canons have willed that it might be appealed to from any part of the world, but that no one may be allowed to appeal from it."

The Catholic doctrine of the sedes apostolica (apostolic see) states that every bishop of Rome, as Peter's successor, possesses the full authority granted to this position, so that this power is inviolable on the grounds that it was established by God himself and not bound to any individual. Leo I (440-461), with the aid of Roman law, solidified this doctrine by making the bishop of Rome the legal heir of Peter. According to Leo, the apostle Peter continued to speak to the Christian community through his successors as bishop of Rome.

== Roman emperor's decree ==
=== Phocas' decree ===
When Phocas took the Byzantine throne in 602, the Diocese of Rome, Bishop Gregory I, praised Phocas as a "restorer of liberty" and referred to him as a pious and clement lord. Meanwhile Bishop Gregory died in 604, and also his successor, Sabinian, in 606. After almost a year of vacancy, Phocas appointed Boniface III as the new bishop of Rome on February 19, 607 AD. Then, through imperial decree of the Roman government, Phocas proclaimed Boniface III as the "Head of all the Churches" and "Universal Bishop". Phocas transferred the title of "Universal Bishop" from the diocese of Constantinople to the diocese of Rome. Boniface sought and obtained a decree from Phocas which he restated that "the See of Blessed Peter the Apostle should be the head of all the Churches" and ensured that the title of "Universal Bishop" belonged exclusively to the bishop of Rome. This act effectively ended the attempt by Patriarch Cyriacus of Constantinople to establish himself as "universal bishop".

== East–West Schism ==
The dispute about the authority of Roman bishops reached a climax in the year 1054 when Michael I Cerularius tried to bolster his position as the Patriarch of Constantinople, seeming to set himself up as a rival of Pope Leo IX, as the popes previously had forbidden calling Constantinople a patriarchate. The dispute ended when the pope's legate excommunicated Michael I Cerularius and, in exchange, he excommunicated the pope—who by then was already dead, due to sickness. This event resulted in the separation of the churches.

Factors furthering the east-west split included the Western adoption of the filioque with the Roman Church's unilateral acceptance of it without the approval of an Ecumenical council, and the pope's usage of a forged document, the so-called Donation of Constantine, to support his authority against the Eastern Church.

== Second Council of Lyons ==
The Second Council of Lyon was convoked to act on a pledge by Byzantine emperor Michael VIII to reunite the Eastern church with the West. Wishing to end the Great Schism that divided Rome and Constantinople, Gregory X had sent an embassy to Michael VIII Palaeologus, who had reconquered Constantinople. Michael VIII had put an end to the remnants of the Latin Empire in the East and had asked Latin despots in the East to curb their ambitions.

On 29 June (Feast of Peter & Paul, patronal feast of popes), Gregory X celebrated a Mass in St John's Church, where both sides took part. The council declared that the Roman church possessed “the supreme and full primacy and authority over the universal Catholic Church.”

The council was seemingly a success, but did not provide a lasting solution to the schism; the Emperor was anxious to heal the schism, but the Eastern clergy proved to be obstinate. Patriarch Joseph of Constantinople abdicated and was replaced by John Bekkos, a convert to the cause of union. In spite of a sustained campaign by Bekkos to defend the union intellectually, and vigorous and brutal repression of opponents by Michael VIII, the vast majority of Byzantine Christians remained implacably opposed to union with the Latin "heretics". Michael's death in December 1282 put an end to the union of Lyons. His son and successor Andronicus II repudiated the union and Bekkos was forced to abdicate, being eventually exiled and imprisoned until his death in 1297. He is to this day reviled by many in the Eastern Church as a traitor to Orthodoxy.

== Reformation ==
The primacy of the Roman Pontiff was again challenged in 1517 when Martin Luther began preaching against several practices in the Catholic Church, including abuses involving indulgences. When Pope Leo X refused to support Luther's position, Luther proposed an "invisible church" (that is, a group including Christians who did not belong in a visible way to the Roman Catholic Church) and eventually called the pope the Antichrist. Luther's rejection of the primacy of the Roman Pontiff led to the start of the Protestant Reformation, during which numerous persons in Europe broke away from the Roman Catholic Church and formed various other Christian denominations.

The Catholic Church in England, by act of Parliament, also legally broke away from the Roman Catholic Church at this time, for political and marital reasons and appealing to theological principles. Christianity had been in England since the Roman military occupation, originally predating claims of primacy of the bishop of Rome that centuries later had come to be accepted in England. King Henry VIII and his parliaments rejected tout court the juridical primacy of the bishop of Rome and his papal successors in favour of a royal supremacy, which reached its final refinement during the reign of his daughter Elizabeth I.

== First Vatican Council ==
The doctrine of papal primacy was further developed in 1870 at the First Vatican Council where ultramontanism achieved victory over conciliarism with the pronouncement of papal infallibility (the ability of the pope to define dogmas free from error ex cathedra) and of papal supremacy, i.e., supreme, full, immediate, and universal ordinary jurisdiction of the pope.

The most substantial body of defined doctrine on the subject is found in Pastor aeternus, the Dogmatic Constitution on the Church of Christ of Vatican Council I. This document declares that "in the disposition of God the Roman church holds the preeminence of ordinary power over all the other churches". This council also affirmed the dogma of papal infallibility, deciding that the “infallibility” of the Christian community extended to the pope himself, when he appeals to his highest authority in defining matters of faith.

Vatican I defined a twofold primacy of Peter—one in papal teaching on faith and morals (the charism of infallibility), and the other a primacy of jurisdiction involving government and discipline of the Church—submission to both being necessary to Catholic faith.

Vatican I rejected the ideas that papal decrees have "no force or value unless confirmed by an order of the secular power" and that the pope's decisions can be appealed to an ecumenical council "as to an authority higher than the Roman Pontiff."

Paul Collins argues that "(the doctrine of papal primacy as formulated by the First Vatican Council) has led to the exercise of untrammelled papal power and has become a major stumbling block in ecumenical relationships with the Orthodox (who consider the definition to be heresy) and Protestants."

Forced to break off prematurely by secular political developments in 1870, Vatican I left behind it a somewhat unbalanced ecclesiology. "In theology the question of papal primacy was so much in the foreground that the Church appeared essentially as a centrally directed institution which one was dogged in defending but which only encountered one externally," It adjourned abruptly, without time to consider matters such as the relationship of the bishops and the faithful to Jesus' promise that "the gates of hades will not prevail against it [the church]" (Mt 16:18).

== Second Vatican Council ==
At the Second Vatican Council (1962–1965) the debate on papal primacy and authority re-emerged, and in the Dogmatic Constitution on the Church (Lumen gentium) the Roman Catholic Church's teaching on the authority of the pope, bishops and councils was further elaborated. Vatican II sought to correct the unbalanced ecclesiology left behind by Vatican I.

Vatican II reaffirmed everything Vatican I taught about papal primacy and infallibility but it added important points about bishops. Bishops, it says, are not "vicars of the Roman Pontiff". Rather, in governing their local churches they are "vicars and legates of Christ". Together they form a body, a "college", whose head is the pope. This episcopal college is responsible for the well-being of the universal Church. Here in a nutshell are the basic elements of the Council's much-discussed communio ecclesiology, which affirms the importance of local churches and the doctrine of collegiality.

In a key passage about collegiality, Vatican II teaches: "The order of bishops is the successor to the college of the apostles in their role as teachers and pastors, and in it the apostolic college is perpetuated. Together with their head, the Supreme Pontiff, and never apart from him, they have supreme and full authority over the Universal Church; but this power cannot be exercised without the agreement of the Roman Pontiff". Much of the present discussion of papal primacy is concerned with exploring the implications of this passage.

Chapter 3 of the dogmatic constitution on the Church of Vatican Council I (Pastor aeternus) is the principal document of the magisterium about the content and nature of the primatial power of the Roman Pontiff. Chapter 4 is a development and defining of one particular characteristic of this primatial power, namely the pope's supreme teaching authority, i.e. when the pope speaks ex cathedra a he teaches the doctrine of the faith infallibly. There is general agreement that the pope has only twice exercised his authority to proclaim a dogma apart from an ecumenical council, in the case of the immaculate conception (1854) and of Mary's assumption (1950). Popes Pius IX and Pius XII both consulted with the bishops around the world before pronouncing that these beliefs were infallibly held by Catholics.

== See also ==
- History of the papacy
- Papal titles
- Pontifex Maximus (Latin for Supreme Pontiff)
- Papal infallibility
- Papal supremacy
- Primacy of Simon Peter

== Sources ==
- [Council Of Chalcedon] Schaff, Philip; et al. (1885). "Canon III" . Nicene and Post-Nicene Fathers: Series II/Volume XIV/The Second Ecumenical Council/Canons – via Wikisource.
- Duffy, Eamon (2014). Saints and Sinners: A History of the Popes (fourth (Kindle) ed.). New Haven: Yale University Press. ISBN 978-0-300-11597-0.
- Dvornik, Francis (1966). Byzantium and the Roman primacy. New York: Fordham University Press. ISBN 9780823207015.
- Nichols, Terence L. (1997). That all may be one: hierarchy and participation in the Church. Collegeville, MN: Liturgical Press. ISBN 978-0-8146-5857-4.
- Nichols, Aidan (2010). Rome and the Eastern Churches: a study in schism (2nd ed.). San Francisco: Ignatius Press. ISBN 978-1-58617-282-4.
- Schimmelpfennig, Bernhard (1992). The Papacy. Columbia University Press. ISBN 978-0-231-07515-2.
