= Marcianus of Arles =

3rd-century bishop of Arles

Marcianus of Arles or Marcion of Arles was the 3rd-century bishop of Arles who later converted to Novatianism. After his conversion, Faustinus, bishop of Lyon denounced him, and Cyprian wrote a letter to Stephen, exhorting the Roman bishop to join in the excommunication of Marcion, so that when he has been excommunicated, another bishop may be elected in his place. However, despite the Gallic bishops denouncing Marcianus, Pope Stephen I refused to excommunicate him.
