= Zechariah of Lyon =

Late 2nd/early third century bishop of Lyon

Zechariah of Lyon (Latin: Zacharias) was the third bishop of Lyon. He is recognised as a saint by both the Roman Catholic Church and the Eastern Orthodox Church. His feast day is celebrated on 28 June.

Very little is known of his life. He escaped from the persecution of 202 and succeeded St. Irenaeus as the third bishop of Lyon.

Catholic Church titles
Preceded by Irenaeus	Bishop of Lyon; 3rd century	Succeeded by Helios
