= Helios of Lyon =

French Catholic bishop and saint

Helios (French: Hélie), also known as Helius, Ælius or Helias, was the fourth bishop of Lyon. He is recognized as a saint by both the Orthodox Church and the Roman Catholic Church.

Very little is known of his life. He succeeded Zacharie of Lyon in the first half of the 3rd century. St. Gregory of Tours claims in his In Gloria confessorum that at his death, when a thief opened his tomb to strip his body, the corpse of Helius grabbed the thief and delivered him until the arrival of Justice. Gregory of Tours knew the location of his funeral in the crypt. Like most of the early bishops of Lyon, his name is Greek.

Catholic Church titles
Preceded by Zechariah	Bishop of Lyon; 3rd century	Succeeded by Faustinus
