= Irenaeus =

2nd-century Greek bishop and Church Father

Saint Irenaeus of Lyon
- Doctor of the Church
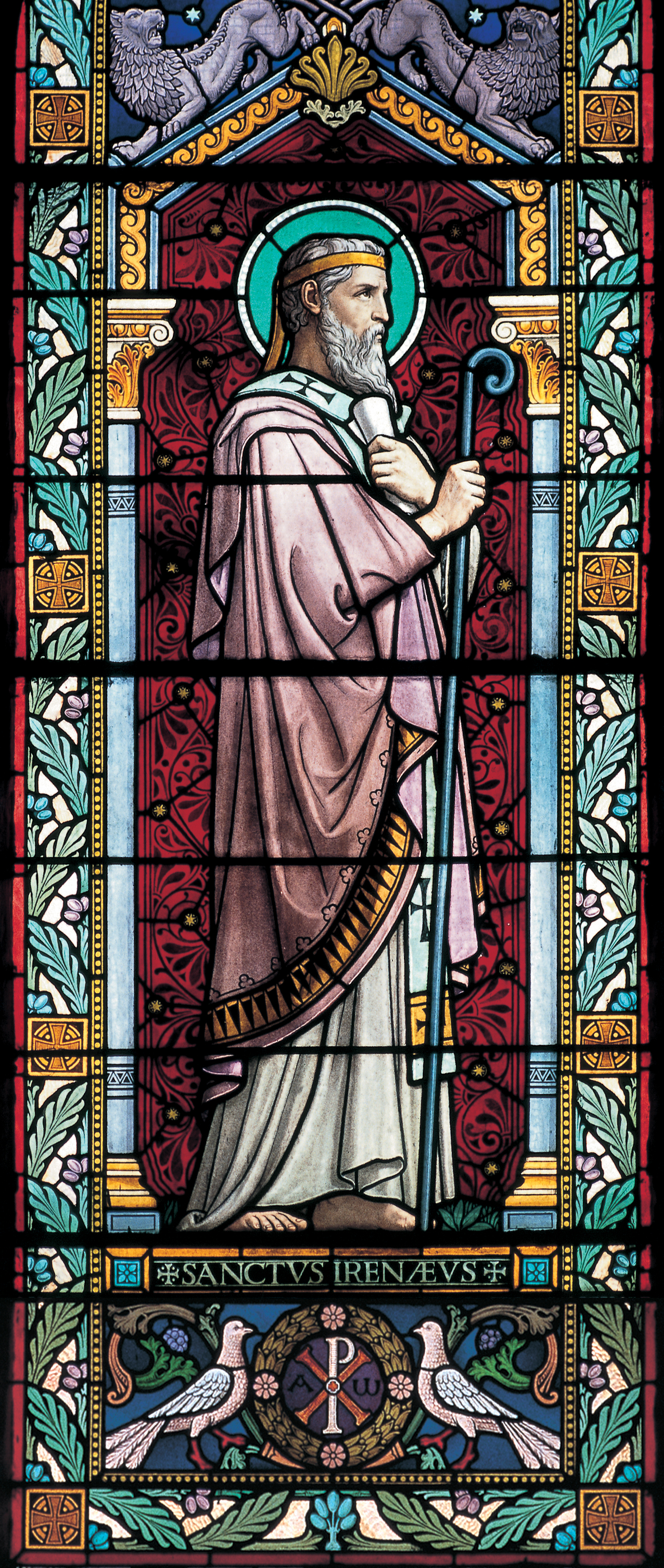
- Stained-glass portrait by Lucien Bégule, 1901
- Diocese: Lyon
- See: Lyon
- Predecessor: Pothinus
- Successor: Zechariah

Personal details
- Born: before c. 155 AD Smyrna, Asia, Roman Empire
- Died: after c. 191 AD Lugdunum, Gallia Lugdunensis, Roman Empire

Sainthood
- Feast day: June 28 (Latin Catholic Church, Orthodox Church, Lutheranism, Anglicanism); August 23 (Eastern Catholic, Eastern Orthodox and Oriental Orthodox Churches); Monday after fourth Sunday of the Exaltation of the Cross (Armenian Apostolic Church)
- Venerated in: Catholic Church; Eastern Orthodox Church; Oriental Orthodox Church; Assyrian Church of the East; Lutheranism; Anglicanism
- Title as Saint: Bishop of Lyon, Venerable, Hieromartyr, Church Father, Doctor of the Church
- Theology career
- Notable work: Against Heresies
- Theological work
- Era: Patristic Age
- Language: Greek
- Tradition or movement: Trinitarianism
- Main interests: Theodicy, millennialism
- Notable ideas: Irenaean theodicy Recapitulation theory of atonement

Irenaeus
- Influences: Clement, Ignatius, Justin Martyr, Papias, Polycarp, The Shepherd of Hermas
- Influenced: Agapius, Augustine, Basil the Great, Epiphanius, Hippolytus, Tertullian

Irenaeus of Lyon (/ɪrɪˈneɪəs/ or /ˌaɪrɪˈniːəs/; Koine Greek: Εἰρηναῖος, romanized: Eirēnaîos, IPA: [i.re̝ˈnɛ.os]) was a Greek bishop in the second century, noted for his role in guiding and expanding Christian communities in the southern regions of present-day France and, more widely, for the development of Christian theology by opposing Gnostic interpretations of Christian Scripture and defending orthodoxy. Originating from Smyrna, he had seen and heard the preaching of Polycarp, who in turn was said to have heard John the Evangelist.

Chosen as Bishop of Lugdunum, now Lyon, Irenaeus wrote his best-known work Against Heresies around 180 as a refutation of gnosticism, in particular that of Valentinus. To counter the doctrines of the gnostic sects claiming secret wisdom, he offered three pillars of orthodoxy: the scriptures, the tradition said to be handed down from the apostles, and the teaching of the apostles' successors. He is the earliest surviving witness to regard all four of the now-canonical gospels as essential.

Irenaeus is venerated as a saint in the Catholic Church, Anglican Church, Lutheran Churches, the Eastern Orthodox Church, the Oriental Orthodox Churches, and the Assyrian Church of the East. He was declared a Doctor of the Church in the Catholic Church by Pope Francis in 2022.

== Biography ==
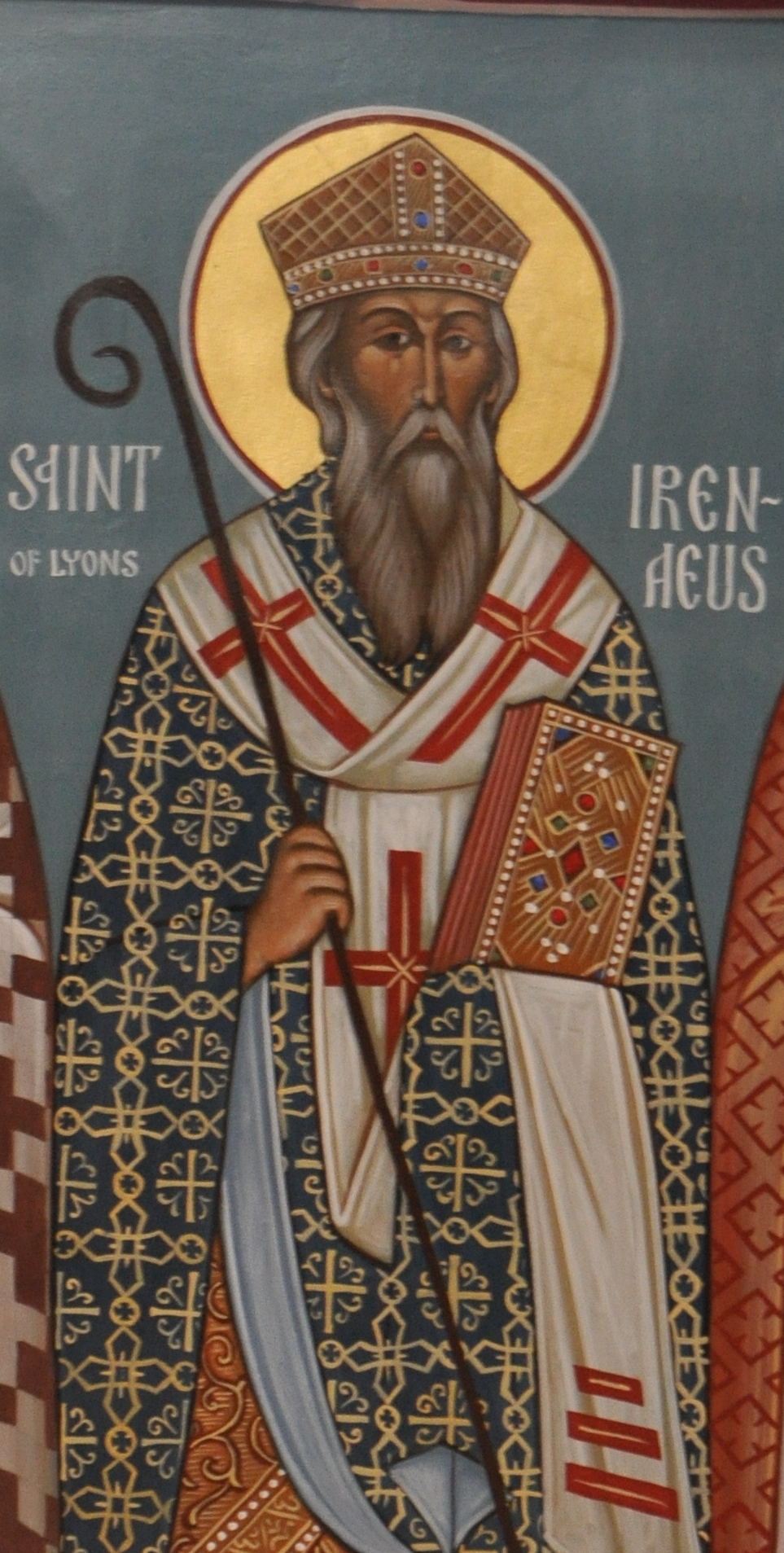
Fresco of Saint Irenaeus from Christ the Savior Russian Orthodox Church, Wayne, West Virginia

Irenaeus was a Greek from Polycarp's hometown of Smyrna in Anatolia, now İzmir, Turkey, born some time before Polycarp's death circa 155 AD. Unlike many of his contemporaries, he was brought up in a Christian family rather than converting as an adult.

During a local persecution of Christians around Lyon during the reign of Marcus Aurelius, the Roman emperor from 161 to 180, Irenaeus was a priest of the Church of Lyon. The clergy of that city, many of whom were suffering imprisonment for the faith, sent him to Rome in 177 with a letter to Pope Eleutherius concerning the heresy of Montanism, and that occasion bore emphatic testimony to his merits. While Irenaeus was in Rome, the Lyon persecution took place. Returning to Gaul, Irenaeus succeeded the martyr Saint Pothinus and became the second bishop of Lyon.

During the religious peace which followed the Lyon persecution, the new bishop divided his activities between the duties of a pastor and of a missionary (as to which we have but brief data, late and not very certain). Almost all his writings were directed against Gnosticism. The most famous of these writings is On the Detection and Overthrow of the So-Called Gnosis, usually known by the abbreviated title Against Heresies (Adversus haereses). Irenaeus alludes to coming across Gnostic writings, and holding conversations with Gnostics, and this may have taken place in Anatolia or in Rome. However, it also appears that Gnosticism was present near Lyon: he writes that there were followers of 'Marcus the Magician' living and teaching in the Rhone valley.

Little is known about the career of Irenaeus after he became bishop. The last action reported of him (by Eusebius, 150 years later) is that in 190 or 191, he exerted influence on Pope Victor I not to excommunicate the Christian communities of Anatolia which persevered in the practice of the Quartodeciman celebration of Easter.

Nothing is known of the date of his death, which must have occurred at the end of the second or the beginning of the third century. He is regarded as a martyr by the Catholic Church and by some within the Orthodox Church. (Note: Gregory of Tours is the first to mention a tradition which held Irenaeus to be a martyr) He was buried under the Church of Saint John in Lyon, which was later renamed St Irenaeus in his honour. The church was devastated in 1562 by the Huguenots. Several relics supposedly of Irenaeus are held in various churches in Lyon. Two crania from different churches were dated by carbon-14 to the Middle Ages, but a piece of heelbone kept in the Lyon Cathedral is from the right time period.

== Veneration ==
The Latin Catholic Church celebrates Irenaeus' memorial on 28 June. Pope Francis declared Irenaeus the 37th Doctor of the Church on 21 January 2022. Francis also conferred upon Irenaeus the supplementary title Doctor unitatis ("Doctor of Unity").

The Eastern Orthodox Church celebrates Irenaeus, the feast being on 23 August.

Lutheran Churches honor Irenaeus on their calendar of saints on 28 June.

Irenaeus is honored in the Church of England and in the Episcopal Church on 28 June.

== Writings ==
Irenaeus wrote a number of books, but the most important that survives is Against Heresies (Latin: Adversus haereses), written around 180. In Book I, Irenaeus talks about the Valentinian Gnostics and their predecessors, who he says go as far back as the magician Simon Magus. In Book II he attempts to provide proof that Valentinianism contains no merit in terms of its doctrines. In Book III, Irenaeus attempts to show that these doctrines are false, by providing counter-evidence gleaned from the Gospels. Book IV consists of Jesus's sayings, and here Irenaeus also stresses the unity of the Old Testament and the Gospel. In the final volume, Book V, Irenaeus focuses on more sayings of Jesus plus the letters of Paul the Apostle.

Irenaeus wrote: "One should not seek among others the truth that can be easily gotten from the Church. For in her, as in a rich treasury, the apostles have placed all that pertains to truth, so that everyone can drink this beverage of life. She is the door of life." But he also said, "Christ came not only for those who believed from the time of Tiberius Caesar, nor did the Father provide only for those who are now, but for absolutely all men from the beginning, who, according to their ability, feared and loved God and lived justly. . . and desired to see Christ and to hear His voice."

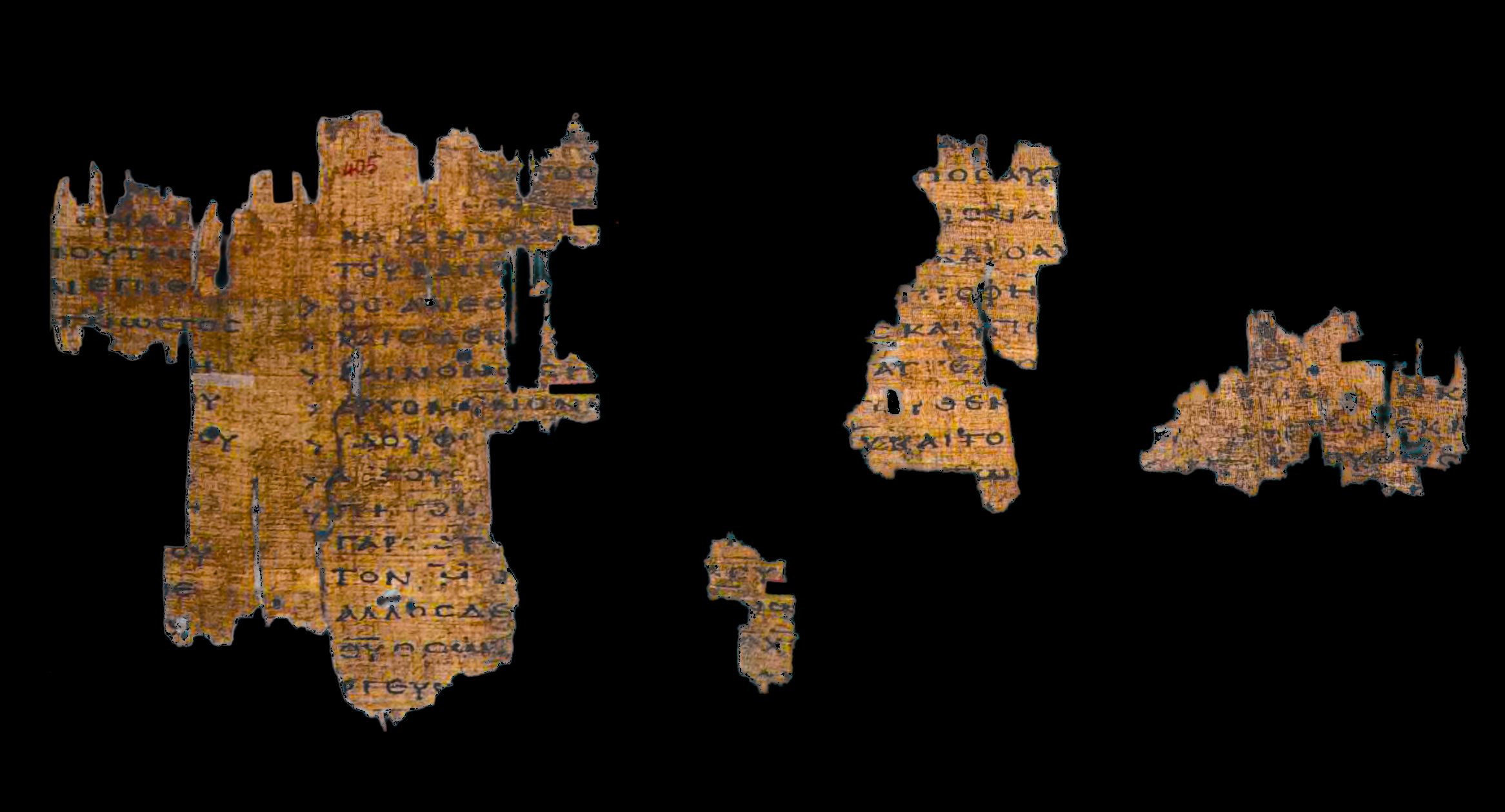
Cambridge University library manuscript 4113 / Papyrus Oxyrhynchus 405. Irenaeus. c. 200 AD.

The purpose of "Against Heresies" was to refute the teachings of various Gnostic groups; apparently, several Greek merchants had begun an oratorial campaign in Irenaeus's bishopric, teaching that the material world was the accidental creation of an evil god, from which we are to escape by the pursuit of gnosis. Irenaeus argued that the true gnosis is in fact knowledge of Christ, which redeems rather than escapes from bodily existence.

Until the discovery of the Library of Nag Hammadi in 1945, Against Heresies was the best-surviving description of Gnosticism. Some religious scholars have argued the findings at Nag Hammadi have shown Irenaeus's description of Gnosticism to be inaccurate and polemic in nature. However, the general consensus among modern scholars is that Irenaeus was fairly accurate in his transmission of gnostic beliefs, and that the Nag Hammadi texts have raised no substantial challenges to the overall accuracy of Irenaeus's information. Religious historian Elaine Pagels criticizes Irenaeus for describing Gnostic groups as sexual libertines, for example, when some of their own writings advocated chastity more strongly than did orthodox texts. However, the Nag Hammadi texts do not present a single, coherent picture of any unified gnostic system of belief, but rather divergent beliefs of multiple Gnostic sects. Some of these sects were indeed libertine because they considered bodily existence meaningless; others praised chastity, and strongly prohibited any sexual activity, even within marriage.

Irenaeus also wrote The Demonstration of the Apostolic Preaching (also known as Proof of the Apostolic Preaching), an Armenian copy of which was discovered in 1904. This work seems to have been an instruction for recent Christian converts. (Note: This work was first published in 1907 in Armenian, along with a German translation by Adolf von Harnack. It is Harnack who divided the text into one hundred numbered sections.)

Eusebius attests to other works by Irenaeus, today lost, including On the Ogdoad, an untitled letter to Blastus regarding schism, On the Subject of Knowledge, On the Monarchy or How God is not the Cause of Evil, On Easter. Irenaeus exercised wide influence on the generation which followed. Both Hippolytus and Tertullian freely drew on his writings. However, none of his works aside from Against Heresies and The Demonstration of the Apostolic Preaching survive today, perhaps because his literal hope of an earthly millennium may have made him uncongenial reading in the Greek East. Even though no complete version of Against Heresies in its original Greek exists, we possess the full ancient Latin version, probably of the third century, as well as thirty-three fragments of a Syrian version and a complete Armenian version of books 4 and 5.

Evelyn Underhill in her book Mysticism credited Irenaeus as being one of those to whom we owe "the preservation of that mighty system of scaffolding which enabled the Catholic mystics to build up the towers and bulwarks of the City of God."

Irenaeus's works were first translated into English by John Keble and published in 1872 as part of the Library of the Fathers series.

== Scripture ==
Irenaeus pointed to the public rule of faith, authoritatively articulated by the preaching of bishops and inculcated in Church practice, especially worship, as an authentic apostolic tradition by which to read Scripture truly against heresies. He classified as Scripture not only the Old Testament but most of the books now known as the New Testament, while excluding many works, a large number by Gnostics, that flourished in the 2nd century and claimed scriptural authority. Oftentimes, Irenaeus, as a student of Polycarp, who he claimed was a student of John, believed that he was interpreting scriptures in the same hermeneutic as the Apostles. This connection to Jesus was important to Irenaeus because both he and the Gnostics based their arguments on Scripture. Irenaeus argued that since he could trace his authority to Jesus and the Gnostics could not, his interpretation of Scripture was correct. He also used "the Rule of Faith", a "proto-creed" with similarities to the Apostles' Creed, as a hermeneutical key to argue that his interpretation of Scripture was correct.

Before Irenaeus, Christians differed as to which gospel they preferred. The Christians of Anatolia preferred the Gospel of John. The Gospel of Matthew was the most popular overall. Irenaeus asserted that all four of the Gospels, John, Luke, Matthew, and Mark (which is the order presented in his four pillar narrative in Adversus haereses (Against Heresies) III 11,8), were canonical scripture. (Note: "But it is not possible that the Gospels can be either more or fewer in number than they are. For since there are four zones of the world in which we live, and four principal winds, while the church has been scattered throughout the world, and since the 'pillar and ground' of the Church is the Gospel and the spirit of life, it is fitting that she should have four pillars, breathing incorruption on every side, and vivifying human afresh. From this fact, it is evident that the Logos, the fashioner demiourgos of all, he that sits on the cherubim and holds all things together, when he was manifested to humanity, gave us the gospel under four forms but bound together by one spirit."(Irenaeus 1885, Book III, Chapter 11, Section 8)) Thus Irenaeus provides the earliest witness to the assertion of the four canonical Gospels, possibly in reaction to Marcion's edited version of the Gospel of Luke, which Marcion asserted was the one and only true gospel.

Based on the arguments Irenaeus made in support of only four authentic gospels, some interpreters deduce that the fourfold Gospel must have still been a novelty in Irenaeus's time. Against Heresies 3.11.7 acknowledges that many heterodox Christians use only one gospel while 3.11.9 acknowledges that some use more than four. (Note: McDonald & Sanders 2001, pp. 280, 310 summarizing Irenaeus 1885, Book III, Chapter 11, Section 7: the Ebionites use Matthew's Gospel, Marcion mutilates Luke's, the Docetists use Mark's, the Valentinians use John's) The success of Tatian's Diatessaron, a harmonization of the four gospels (c. 160–175), is "... a powerful indication that the fourfold Gospel contemporaneously sponsored by Irenaeus was not broadly, let alone universally, recognized."

Irenaeus is also the earliest to say that the Gospel of John was written by John the Apostle, and that the Gospel of Luke was written by Luke, the companion of Paul.

Scholars contend that Irenaeus quotes from 21 of the 27 New Testament books. (Note: Matthew 3:16; Mark 3:10; Luke 3:14; John 3:11; Acts of the Apostles 3:14; Romans 3:16; 1 Corinthians 1:3; 2 Corinthians 3:7; Galatians 3:22; Ephesians 5:2; Philippians 4:18; Colossians 1:3; 1 Thessalonians 5:6; 2 Thessalonians 5:25; 1 Timothy (Preface); 2 Timothy 3:14; Titus 3:3; 1 Peter 4:9; 1 John 3:16; 2 John 1:16; Revelation 4:20) (Note: Irenaeus, in 'Against Heresies', quotes 626 times from all 4 Gospels; from Acts 54 times.")

He may refer to Hebrews and James, but does not cite Philemon.

Irenaeus cited the New Testament approximately 1,000 times. About one third of his citations are made to Paul's letters. Irenaeus considered all 13 letters belonging to the Pauline corpus to have been written by Paul himself.

== Apostolic authority ==
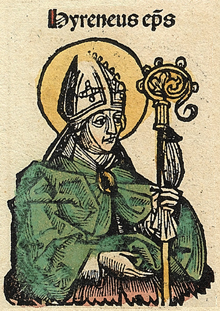
Irenaeus in the Nuremberg Chronicle

In his writing against the Gnostics, who claimed to possess a secret oral tradition from Jesus himself, Irenaeus claimed that the bishops in different cities are known as far back as the Apostles and that the oral tradition he lists from the Apostles is a safe guide to the interpretation of Scripture. (Note: "Wherefore we must obey the priests of the Church who have succession from the Apostles, as we have shown, who, together with succession in the episcopate, have received the certain mark of truth according to the will of the Father; all others, however, are to be suspected, who separated themselves from the principal succession.(Irenaeus 1885, Book IV, Chapter 26)) In a passage that became a locus classicus of Catholic-Protestant polemics, he cited the Roman church as an example of the unbroken chain of authority, which text Catholic polemics would use to assert the primacy of Rome over Eastern churches by virtue of its preeminent authority. (Note: Irenaeus himself tells us (Irenaeus 1885, Book III, Chapter 3, Section 4) cf Eusebius 1890, Book V Chapter 20, Section 5ff that in his 'youth' he saw Polycarp, the Bishop of Smyrna who was martyred c156. This is the evidence used to assume that Irenaeus was born in Smyrna during the 130s–140s.) The succession of bishops and presbyters was important to establish a chain of custody for orthodoxy.

Irenaeus's point when refuting the Gnostics was that all of the Apostolic churches had preserved the same traditions and teachings in many independent streams. It was the unanimous agreement between these many independent streams of transmission that proved the orthodox faith, current in those churches, to be true.

== Theology and contrast with Gnosticism ==
The central point of Irenaeus's theology is the unity and the goodness of God, in opposition to the Gnostics' theory of God; a number of divine emanations (Aeons) along with a distinction between the Monad and the Demiurge. Irenaeus uses the Logos theology, common in 2nd Century Christian theology. Irenaeus was a student of Polycarp, who was said to have been tutored by John the Apostle. Irenaeus often spoke of the Son and the Spirit as the "hands of God," though he also spoke of the Son as the "Logos."

=== Unity of salvation history ===
Irenaeus's emphasis on the unity of God is reflected in his corresponding emphasis on the unity of salvation history. Irenaeus repeatedly insists that God began the world and has been overseeing it ever since this creative act; everything that has happened is part of his plan for humanity. The essence of this plan is a process of maturation: Irenaeus believes that humanity was created immature, and God intended his creatures to take a long time to grow into or assume the divine likeness.

Everything that has happened since has therefore been planned by God to help humanity overcome this initial mishap and achieve spiritual maturity. The world has been intentionally designed by God as a difficult place, where human beings are forced to make moral decisions, as only in this way can they mature as moral agents. Irenaeus likens death to the big fish that swallowed Jonah: it was only in the depths of the whale's belly that Jonah could turn to God and act according to the divine will. Similarly, death and suffering appear as evils, but without them we could never come to know God.

According to Irenaeus, the high point in salvation history is the advent of Jesus. For Irenaeus, the Incarnation of Christ was intended by God before he determined that humanity would be created. Irenaeus develops this idea based on Rom. 5:14, saying "Forinasmuch as He had a pre-existence as a saving Being, it was necessary that what might be saved should also be called into existence, in order that the Being who saves should not exist in vain." Some theologians maintain that Irenaeus believed that Incarnation would have occurred even if humanity had never sinned; but the fact that they did sin determined his role as the savior.

Irenaeus sees Christ as the new Adam, who systematically undoes what Adam did: thus, where Adam was disobedient concerning God's edict concerning the fruit of the Tree of Knowledge of Good and Evil, Christ was obedient even to death on the wood of a tree. Irenaeus is the first to draw comparisons between Eve and Mary, contrasting the faithlessness of the former with the faithfulness of the latter. In addition to reversing the wrongs done by Adam, Irenaeus thinks of Christ as "recapitulating" or "summing up" human life.

Irenaeus conceives of our salvation as essentially coming about through the incarnation of God as a man. He characterizes the penalty for sin as death and corruption. God, however, is immortal and incorruptible, and simply by becoming united to human nature in Christ he conveys those qualities to us: they spread, as it were, like a benign infection. Irenaeus emphasizes that salvation occurs through Christ's Incarnation, which bestows incorruptibility on humanity, rather than emphasizing His Redemptive death in the crucifixion, although the latter event is an integral part of the former.

==== Christ's life ====
Part of the process of recapitulation is for Christ to go through every stage of human life, from infancy to old age, and simply by living it, sanctify it with his divinity. Irenaeus believed Christ did not die until he was older than is conventionally portrayed.

In the passage of Adversus Haereses under consideration, Irenaeus claims that after receiving baptism at the age of thirty, citing Luke 3:23, Gnostics then falsely assert that "He [Jesus] preached only one year reckoning from His baptism," and also, "On completing His thirtieth year He [Jesus] suffered, being in fact still a young man, and who had by no means attained to advanced age." Irenaeus argues against the Gnostics by using scripture to add several years after his baptism by referencing 3 distinctly separate visits to Jerusalem. The first is when Jesus makes wine out of water, he goes up to the Paschal feast-day, after which he withdraws and is found in Samaria. The second is when Jesus goes up to Jerusalem for Passover and cures the paralytic, after which he withdraws over the sea of Tiberias. The third mention is when he travels to Jerusalem, eats the Passover, and suffers on the following day.

Irenaeus quotes scripture (John 8:57), to suggest that Jesus ministers while in his 40s. In this passage, Jesus's opponents want to argue that Jesus has not seen Abraham, because Jesus is too young. Jesus's opponents argue that Jesus was not yet 50 years old. Irenaeus argues that if Jesus were in his thirties, his opponents would have argued that he was not yet 40 years old, since that would make him even younger. Irenaeus's argument is that they would not weaken their own argument by adding years to Jesus's age. Irenaeus also writes: "The Elders witness to this, who in Asia conferred with John the Lord's disciple, to the effect that John had delivered these things unto them: for he abode with them until the times of Trajan. And some of them saw not only John, but others also of the Apostles, and had this same account from them, and witness to the aforesaid relation."

In Demonstration (74) Irenaeus notes "For Pontius Pilate was governor of Judæa, and he had at that time resentful enmity against Herod the king of the Jews. But then, when Christ was brought to him bound, Pilate sent Him to Herod, giving command to enquire of him, that he might know of a certainty what he should desire concerning Him; making Christ a convenient occasion of reconciliation with the king." Pilate was the prefect of the Roman province of Judaea from AD 26–36. He served under Emperor Tiberius. Herod Antipas was tetrarch of Galilee and Perea, a client state of the Roman Empire. He ruled from 4 BC to 39 AD. In refuting Gnostic claims that Jesus preached for only one year after his baptism, Irenaeus used the "recapitulation" approach to demonstrate that by living beyond the age of thirty Christ sanctified even old age.

=== Use of Paul's Epistles ===
Many aspects of Irenaeus's presentation of salvation history depend on Paul's Epistles.

Irenaeus's conception of salvation relies heavily on the understanding found in Paul's letters. Irenaeus first brings up the theme of victory over sin and evil that is afforded by Jesus's death. God's intervention has saved humanity from the Fall of Adam and the wickedness of Satan. Human nature has become joined with God's in the person of Jesus, thus allowing human nature to have victory over sin. Paul writes on the same theme, that Christ has come so that a new order is formed, and being under the Law, is being under the sin of Adam.

Reconciliation is also a theme of Paul's that Irenaeus stresses in his teachings on Salvation. Irenaeus believes Jesus coming in flesh and blood sanctified humanity so that it might again reflect the perfection associated with the likeness of the Divine. This perfection leads to a new life, in the lineage of God, which is forever striving for eternal life and unity with the Father. This is a carryover from Paul, who attributes this reconciliation to the actions of Christ: "For since death came through a human being, the resurrection of the dead has also come through a human being; for as all die in Adam, so all will be made alive in Christ".

A third theme in both Paul's and Irenaeus's conceptions of salvation is the sacrifice of Christ being necessary for the new life given to humanity in the triumph over evil. It is in this obedient sacrifice that Jesus is victor and reconciler, thus erasing the marks that Adam left on human nature. To argue against the Gnostics on this point, Irenaeus uses Colossians in showing that the debt which came by a tree has been paid for us in another tree. Furthermore, the first chapter of Ephesians is picked up in Irenaeus's discussion of the topic when he asserts, "By His own blood He redeemed us, as also His apostle declares, 'In whom we have redemption through His blood, even the remission of sins.'"

The frequencies of quotations and allusions to the Pauline Epistles in Against Heresies are:

Epistle	Frequency
Romans	84
1 Corinthians	102
2 Corinthians	18
Galatians	27
Ephesians	37
Philippians	13
Colossians	18
1 Thessalonians	2
2 Thessalonians	9
1 Timothy	5
2 Timothy	5
Titus	4
Philemon	0

==== Christ as the New Adam ====
To counter his Gnostic opponents, Irenaeus significantly develops Paul's presentation of Christ as the Last Adam.

Irenaeus's presentation of Christ as the New Adam is based on Paul's Christ-Adam parallel in Romans 5:12–21, but also derives significantly from the Johannine presentation of the Adam-Christ typology. Irenaeus uses this parallel to demonstrate that Christ truly took human flesh. Irenaeus considered it important to emphasize this point because he understands the failure to recognize Christ's full humanity links the various strains of Gnosticism together, as seen in his statement that "according to the opinion of no one of the heretics was the Word of God made flesh." Irenaeus believes that unless the Word became flesh, humans were not fully redeemed. He explains that by becoming man, Christ restored humanity to being in the image and likeness of God, which they had lost in the Fall of man. Just as Adam was the original head of humanity through whom all sinned, Christ is the new head of humanity who fulfills Adam's role in the Economy of Salvation. Irenaeus calls this process of restoring humanity recapitulation.

For Irenaeus, Paul's presentation of the Old Law (the Mosaic covenant) in this passage indicates that the Old Law revealed humanity's sinfulness but could not save them. He explains that "For as the law was spiritual, it merely made sin to stand out in relief, but did not destroy it. For sin had no dominion over the spirit, but over man." Since humans have a physical nature, they cannot be saved by a spiritual law. Instead, they need a human Savior. This is why it was necessary for Christ to take human flesh. Irenaeus summarizes how Christ's taking human flesh saves humanity with a statement that closely resembles Romans 5:19, "For as by the disobedience of the one man who was originally moulded from virgin soil, the many were made sinners, and forfeited life; so was it necessary that, by the obedience of one man, who was originally born from a virgin, many should be justified and receive salvation." The physical creation of Adam and Christ is emphasized by Irenaeus to demonstrate how the Incarnation saves humanity's physical nature.

Irenaeus emphasizes the importance of Christ's reversal of Adam's action. Through His obedience, Christ undoes Adam's disobedience. Irenaeus presents the Passion as the climax of Christ's obedience, emphasizing how this obedience on the tree of the Cross undoes the disobedience that occurred through a tree.

Irenaeus's interpretation of Paul's discussion of Christ as the New Adam is significant because it helped develop the recapitulation theory of atonement. Irenaeus emphasizes that it is through Christ's reversal of Adam's action that humanity is saved, rather than considering the Redemption to occur in a cultic or juridical way. (Note: For other theories of atonement see Atonement in Christianity)

The biblical passage, "Death has been swallowed up in victory", implied for Irenaeus that the Lord will surely resurrect the first human, i.e. Adam, as one of the saved. According to Irenaeus, those who deny Adam's salvation are “shutting themselves out from life for ever” and the first one who did so was Tatian. The notion that the Second Adam saved the first Adam was advocated not only by Irenaeus, but also by Gregory Thaumaturgus, which suggests that it was popular in the Early Church.

=== Valentinian Gnosticism ===
Valentinian Gnosticism was one of the major forms of Gnosticism that Irenaeus opposed.

According to the Gnostic view of Salvation, creation was perfect to begin with; it did not need time to grow and mature. For the Valentinians, the material world is the result of the loss of perfection which resulted from Sophia's desire to understand the Forefather. Therefore, one is ultimately redeemed, through secret knowledge, to enter the pleroma of which the Achamoth originally fell.

According to the Valentinian Gnostics, there are three classes of human beings. They are the material, who cannot attain salvation; the psychic, who are strengthened by works and faith (they are part of the church); and the spiritual, who cannot decay or be harmed by material actions. Essentially, ordinary humans—those who have faith but do not possess the special knowledge—will not attain salvation. Spirituals, on the other hand—those who obtain this great gift—are the only class that will eventually attain salvation.

In his article entitled "The Demiurge", J.P. Arendzen sums up the Valentinian view of the salvation of man. He writes, "The first, or carnal men, will return to the grossness of matter and finally be consumed by fire; the second, or psychic men, together with the Demiurge as their master, will enter a middle state, neither heaven (pleroma) nor hell (hyle); the purely spiritual men will be completely freed from the influence of the Demiurge and together with the Saviour and Achamoth, his spouse, will enter the pleroma divested of body (hyle) and soul (psyche)."

In this understanding of salvation, the purpose of the Incarnation was to redeem the Spirituals from their material bodies. By taking a material body, the Son becomes the Savior and facilitates this entrance into the pleroma by making it possible for the Spirituals to receive his spiritual body. However, in becoming a body and soul, the Son Himself becomes one of those needing redemption. Therefore, the Word descends onto the Savior at His Baptism in the Jordan, which liberates the Son from his corruptible body and soul. His redemption from the body and soul is then applied to the Spirituals. In response to this Gnostic view of Christ, Irenaeus emphasized that the Word became flesh and developed a soteriology that emphasized the significance of Christ's material Body in saving humanity, as discussed in the sections above.

In his criticism of Gnosticism, Irenaeus made reference to a Gnostic gospel which portrayed Judas in a positive light, as having acted in accordance with Jesus's instructions. The recently discovered Gospel of Judas dates close to the period when Irenaeus lived (late 2nd century), and scholars typically regard this work as one of many Gnostic texts, showing one of many varieties of Gnostic beliefs of the period.

== See also ==
- Descriptions in antiquity of the execution cross
- P. Oxy. 405 – 3rd-century papyrus portion of Against Heresies

== Notes ==
Catholic Church titles
Preceded by Pothinus	Bishop of Lyon; 2nd century	Succeeded by Zechariah
