= Faustinus of Lyon =

3rd-century Catholic saint and Bishop of Lyon

Faustin (Latin: Faustinus) was the fifth bishop of Lyon. He is venerated as a saint within the Catholic Church.

== Biography ==
Faustin succeeded Helios in the middle of the 3rd century as bishop of Lyon. In 254, Faustinus wrote to Cyprian, Bishop of Carthage, and to Pope Stephen I regarding the Novatian tendencies of Marcianus, Bishop of Arles, in refusing to forgive Christians who repented after rejecting Christianity during the Decian persecution.

The letter of Cyprian to Pope Stephen begins:

Cyprien brother Stephen, Our colleague Faustin, Lyons, a brother who is very dear, wrote me twice, saying that that is Marcianus in Arles, door against Christians repenting the very serious charge of heresy, so that God's servants who repent, suffer and implore the church in tears, groans and pain, are being denied the consolation and help of divine piety and gentleness of the Father; when they are injured, they do not have the right to come relieve their wounds, but without hope of appeasement and communion, they are left to the wolves and thrown prey to diable.

At that time, Faustin was not the only Gallic bishop, other dioceses having been created at least in Vienne and Arles, and maybe in other cities of Gaul. However, in the case of Marcian, Faustin was the spokesman of the bishops of Gaul.

In the early 5th century, Castor of Apt, Bishop of Apt built in his honor a monastery in Nîmes.

Catholic Church titles
Preceded by Helios	Bishop of Lyon; 3rd century	Succeeded by Verus
