= Embrun =

Embrun may refer to:

- Embrun, Hautes-Alpes, a town and former archbishopric in southeastern France
  - Embrun Cathedral, the national monument and former cathedral there
  - Roman Catholic Archdiocese of Embrun
- Embrun, Ontario, a community in eastern Ontario, Canada
  - Ottawa/Embrun Aerodrome, the local airport of that community.
  - Embrun Panthers, the ice hockey team of Embrun.

== See also ==
- Sir Ebrum, a character from the television series Kirby: Right Back at Ya!
