= Pierre-Louis de Leyssin =

French clergyman

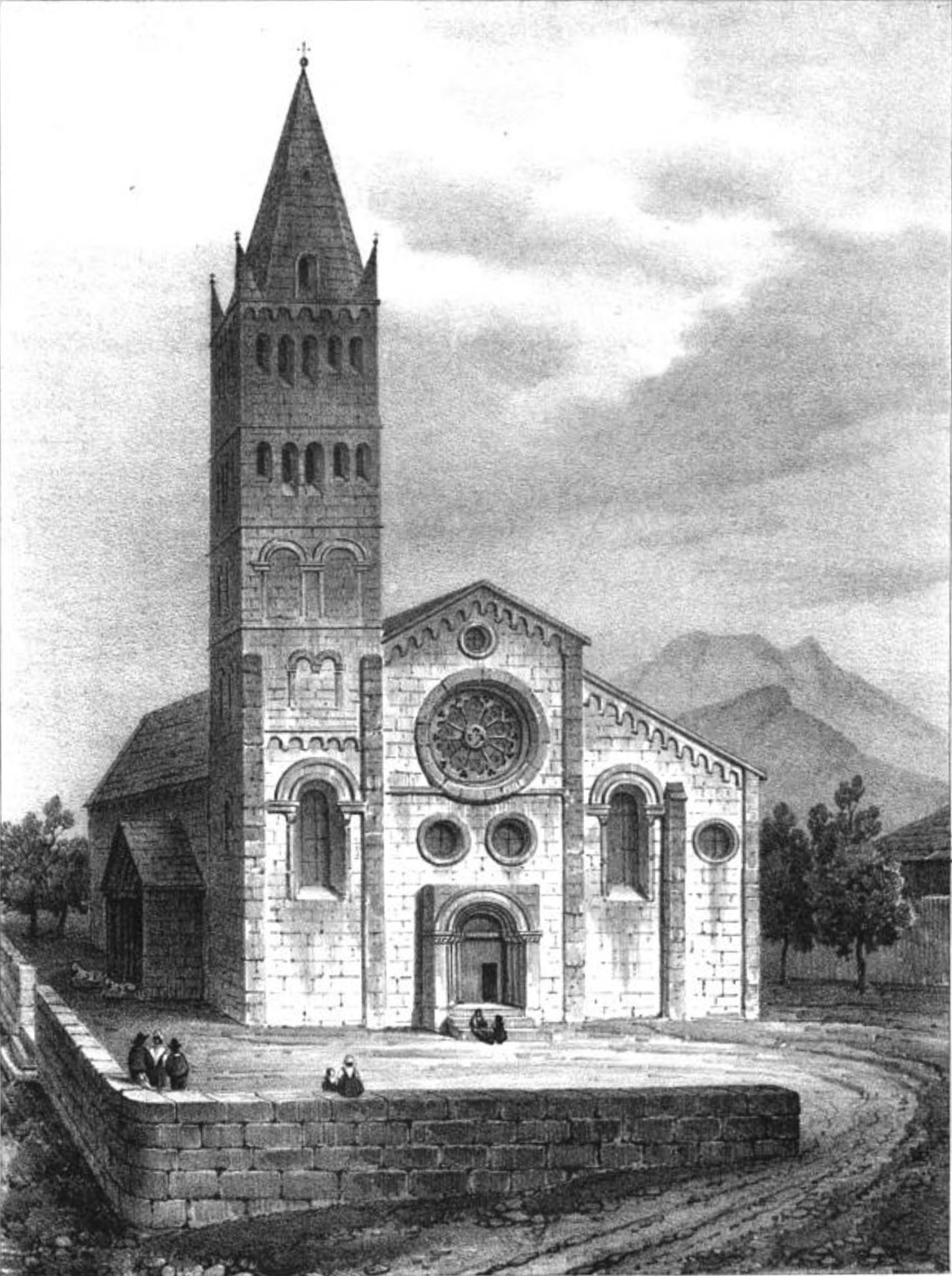
Cathédrale Notre-Dame d'Embrun.

Pierre-Louis Leysin (born in Aosta in the Dauphiné on 2 May 1721 – died in Munich in Bavaria on 26 August 1801) was a French clergyman who was the 81st and last Archbishop of Embrun from 1767 to 1790. Having refused to take the constitutional oath, he died in exile.

== Early life ==
Pierre-Louis Leyssin was the son of François-Louis (died 22 July 1783), Knight of the Order of St. Louis, Baron Domeyssin, co-lord of Culloz and his wife Françoise-Marie de la Martinière.

In the Church, he had a long ecclesiastical career. He received minor orders on 11 March 1742, becomes sub-deacon on 30 March 1743 and deacon on 30 April 1745. He was ordained a priest on 23 December 1747. Doctor of Theology of the Sorbonne in Paris, he received the diaconate of St. noble -Etienne-Saint-Chef Vienna. Vicar-general Jean-Sébastien Barral to Castres bishopric in 1752 he obtained the archdeacon of the Cathedral.

Commendatory of the royal abbey of Saint-Nicolas Septfontaines in the diocese of Reims, he was chosen as vicar general by Claude-Joseph-Mathias Barral, bishop of Troyes. He is member of the Assembly of the clergy of 1765. He was finally appointed archbishop of Embrun on 19 April and confirmed on 15 June 1767. He was consecrated on 5 July by Alexandre Angélique de Talleyrand-Périgord. He chaired the Dauphiné States from December 1788 to January 1790.

== French Revolution ==
He refused to sign the Constitution civile du clergé of 12 July 1790 and refused to take the oath of loyalty. Ignace Caseneuve was appointed constitutional bishop of Hautes-Alpes department in March 1791 and crowned in Paris on 3 April. Pierre-Louis Leyssin was driven from his cathedral in April 1791, where he first retired to Mont-Dauphin twenty kilometers from Embrun.

On 13 July he joined the Tronchet Ceillac in Queyras and reached the Valley of Maurin. He then fled to the Sardinian states where he resided until the French invasion in 1796 and finally he moved to Munich in Bavaria, where he died in 1801, the year the Concordat permanently removes the archbishop of Embrun.

Catholic Church titles
| Preceded by Bernardin-François Fouquet | Bishop of Embrun; 1767–1790 | Succeeded by Ignace de Cazeneuve |
