= Guillaume d'Avançon =

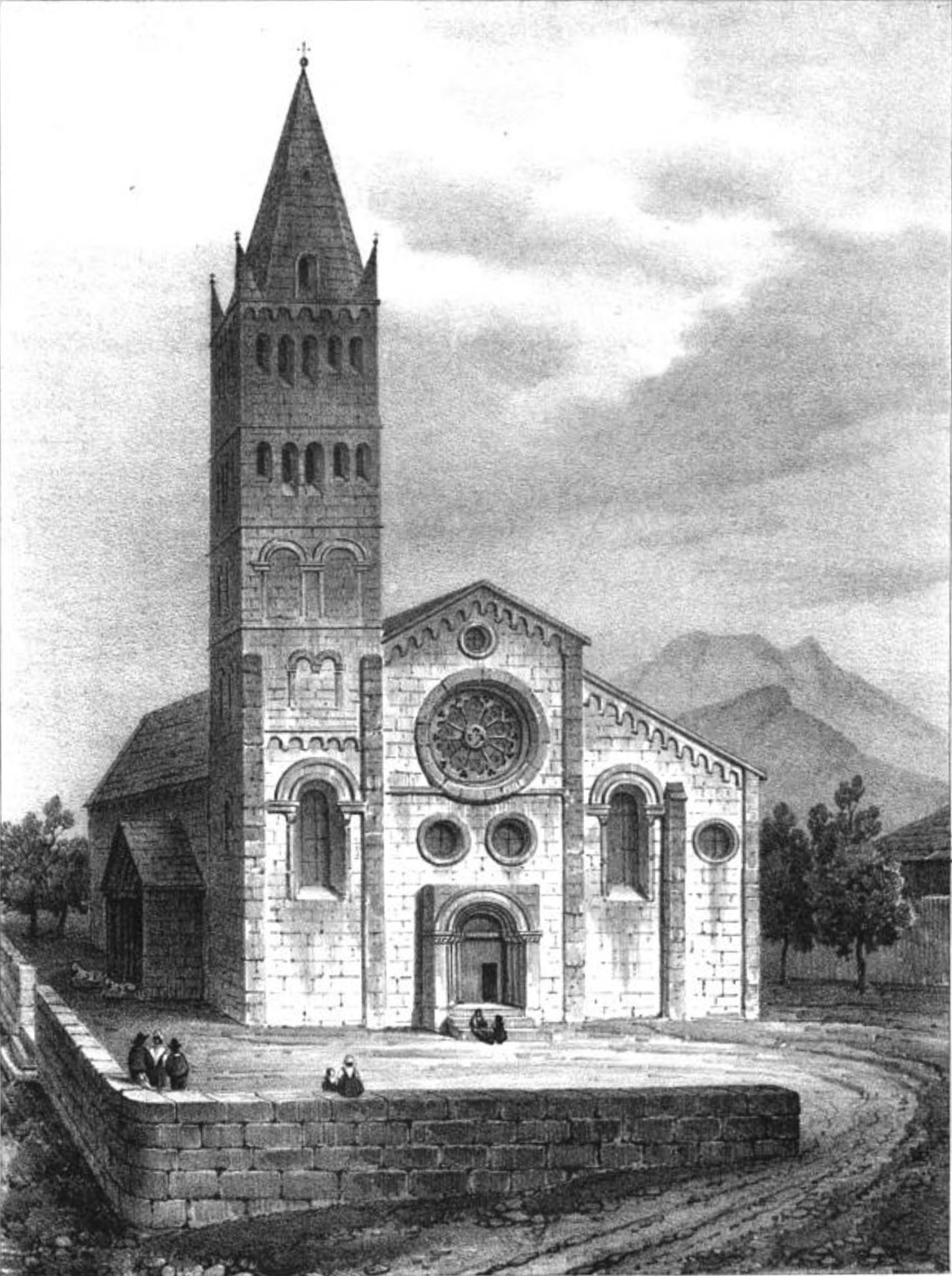
Embrun Cathedral

Guillaume d'Avançon de Saint-Marcel (1535–July 1600) was Archbishop of Embrun in France and a cardinal.

== Biography ==
Guillaume was born in Avançon, Dauphiné, the son of Jean d'Avançon. After studying literature in Grenoble he served as chamberlain to Pope Pius IV, until in 1560 Charles IX appointed him to the archbishopric of Embrun.

From the beginning of his episcopate, d'Avançon showed himself the firmest supporter of faith and public safety. He participated in the Colloquy at Poissy and the last session of the Council of Trent. He was state councillor of Kings Charles IX, Henri III and Henri IV and commander of the bailiwicks of Embrun, Gap and Briançon.

He fought against the Huguenots. In 1585 the city of Embrun was taken by François de Bonne and looted. The archbishop escaped into the Alps and took refuge in Piedmont, from where he sought asylum in Rome. He returned to France in 1588 to attend the States General of Blois, but returned to Rome after the murder of the Duke of Guise.

Avançon was appointed commendatory abbot of Montmajour Abbey in 1595 and returned in 1599 to Embrun.

Pope Clement VIII created him a cardinal in the consistory of 3 March 1599. He died the following year in Grenoble.

Catholic Church titles
Preceded by Robert Cardinal de Lenoncourt	Archbishop of Embrun; 1561–1600	Succeeded by Honoré du Laurens
