= Guillaume d'Hugues =

Archbishop of Emburn and royal diplomat

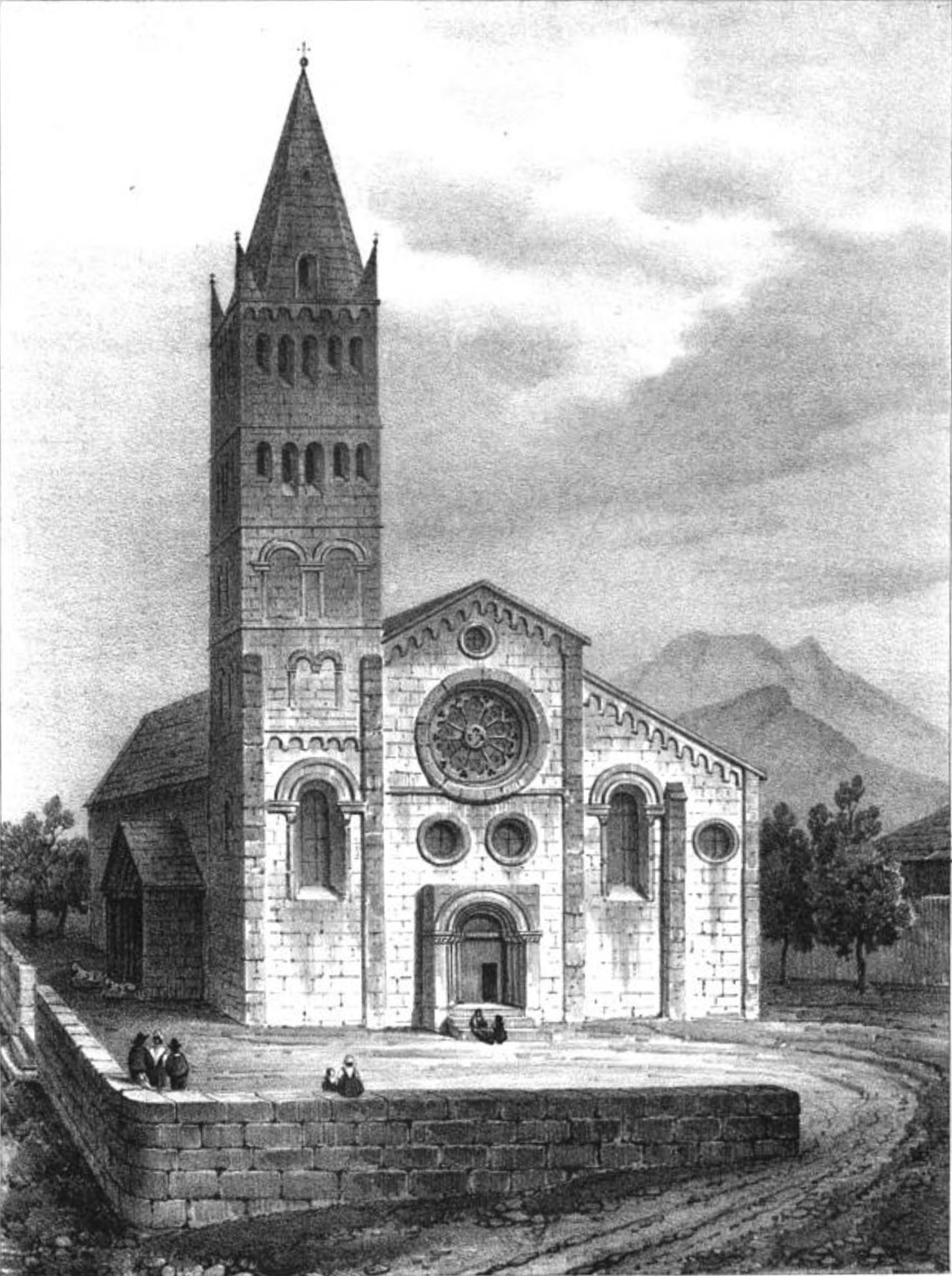
Cathédrale Notre-Dame d'Embrun.

Guillaume IX d’Hugues (died 27 October 1648) was archbishop of Embrun from 16 November 1612 to 27 October 1648 and a diplomat for the French King.

Guillaume IX d’Hugues, third son of Michel and Delphine du Pré, was born in Pouzols in the diocese of Béziers. He entered very young to the Friars Minor Conventual, and was a professor till he was about 37 years. King Henry IV of France undertook the business of France in various courts of Italy, Germany and England and Marie de' Medici, as his regent, appointed Guillaume to the archbishopric of Embrun in 1612. He went to Spain accompanying Elisabeth of France, to marry Philip IV, and led to England, Henriette de France, to marry the future Charles I of England after negotiating these marriages. He built several remarkable monuments in Embrun and died in his diocese on 27 October 1648.

Catholic Church titles
Preceded by Honoré du Laurens	Bishop of Embrun; 1612-1648	Succeeded by Georges d'Aubusson de la Feuillade
