= Palladius of Embrun =

Saint Palladius of Embrun
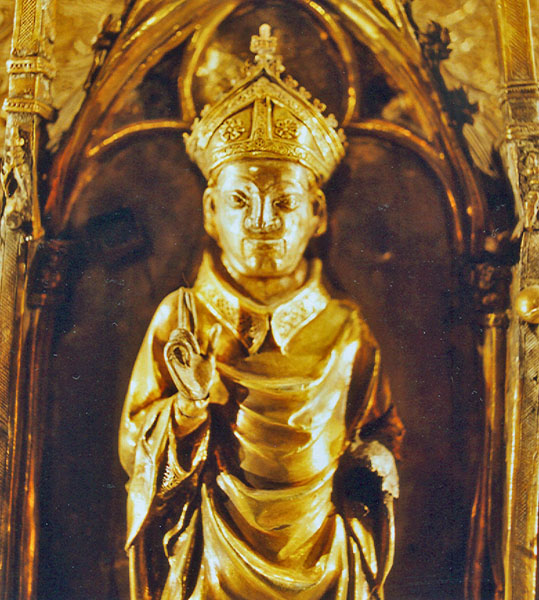
- Detail of 14th century reliquary of Saint Palladius (Arqueta de Sant Patllari). Church of Santa Maria de Camprodon. Camprodon, Catalonia, Spain.

Bishop
- Died: ~541 AD
- Venerated in: Roman Catholic Church
- Major shrine: Santa Maria de Camprodon
- Feast: June 21 (Camprodon)
- Attributes: episcopal attire
- Patronage: Camprodon

Saint Palladius of Embrun (French: Pallade, Pélade, Catalan: Patllari, Pal·ladi) (d. ca. 541 AD) was a 6th-century bishop of Embrun. Born to a Christian family, he studied under Catulin, bishop of Embrun, who had attended the Council of Épaone in 517. When the Arians and Sigismund of Burgundy opposed the council, Catulin was exiled to Vienne. Palladius accompanied him there, and took the opportunity to extensively study Scripture. Palladius was ordained a priest and, according to legend, gained the gift of prophecy. He is said to have predicted the fall and death of Sigismund. Catulin died around 518, and Palladius would later be elected bishop of Embrun. During his episcopate he built numerous churches, in Chorges, Sauze, and Rama, as well as sanctuaries dedicated to Saint Martin of Tours, and Saints Vincent, Orontius, and Victor, as well as to Genesius of Arles. One source states that Palladius "possessed an exceptional efficacy in obtaining whatever he petitioned God for." Many miracles were attributed to him, and, besides the gift of prophecy, he enjoyed a "mystical familiarity with the angels... [and] successfully defeated the machinations of the devil simply by making the sign of the cross."

== Veneration ==
In Catalonia, he is known as Patllari or Pal•ladi. According to a legend associated with his relics, some Benedictine monks decided to go to Embrun to steal Palladius' relics to take them with them to Spain. Once they were in possession of the relics, the monks placed them in a container, which was carried by a donkey. When the travelers reached the outskirts of the town of Camprodon, the animal refused to travel any longer and did not move. The monks tried to get the donkey to budge, but the animal refused. It stamped its feet against the ground: miraculously, three springs of water gushed out from the ground where the donkey had stamped its feet. The monks let the donkey go free. The animal wandered into the town, passing the churches of Carme, Santa Maria, entering the monastery of Sant Pere, where it remained. The monks decided to leave the relics at Camprodon, at Sant Pere.

Contrary to the legend, the relics can actually be found at the church of Santa Maria de Camprodon, a church of mixed Romanesque, Gothic, and Baroque architectural styles.

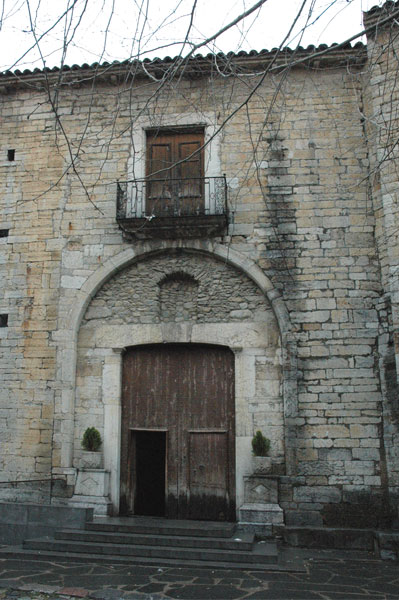
The church of Santa Maria de Camprodon.

However, the 14th century reliquary of Saint Palladius (Arqueta de Sant Patllari) may have proceeded from the monastery of Sant Pere before being moved to Santa Maria.

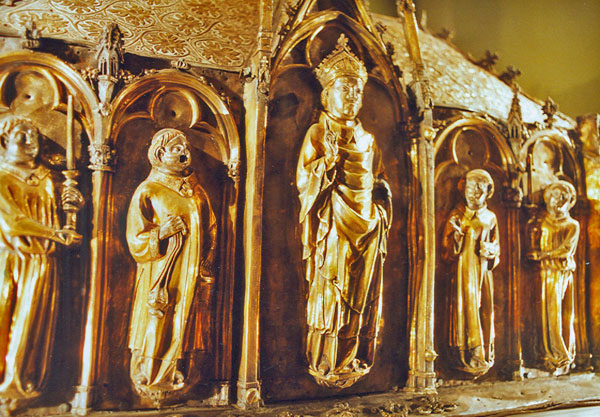
Reliquary of Saint Palladius (Arqueta de Sant Patllari).

In Camprodon, the feast day of Palladius is celebrated with dances (such as the sardana), music, and a procession of “giants” (Cercavila de gegants), which are sculptures of giant historical figures.
