= Ignace Caseneuve =

French politician and constitutional bishop

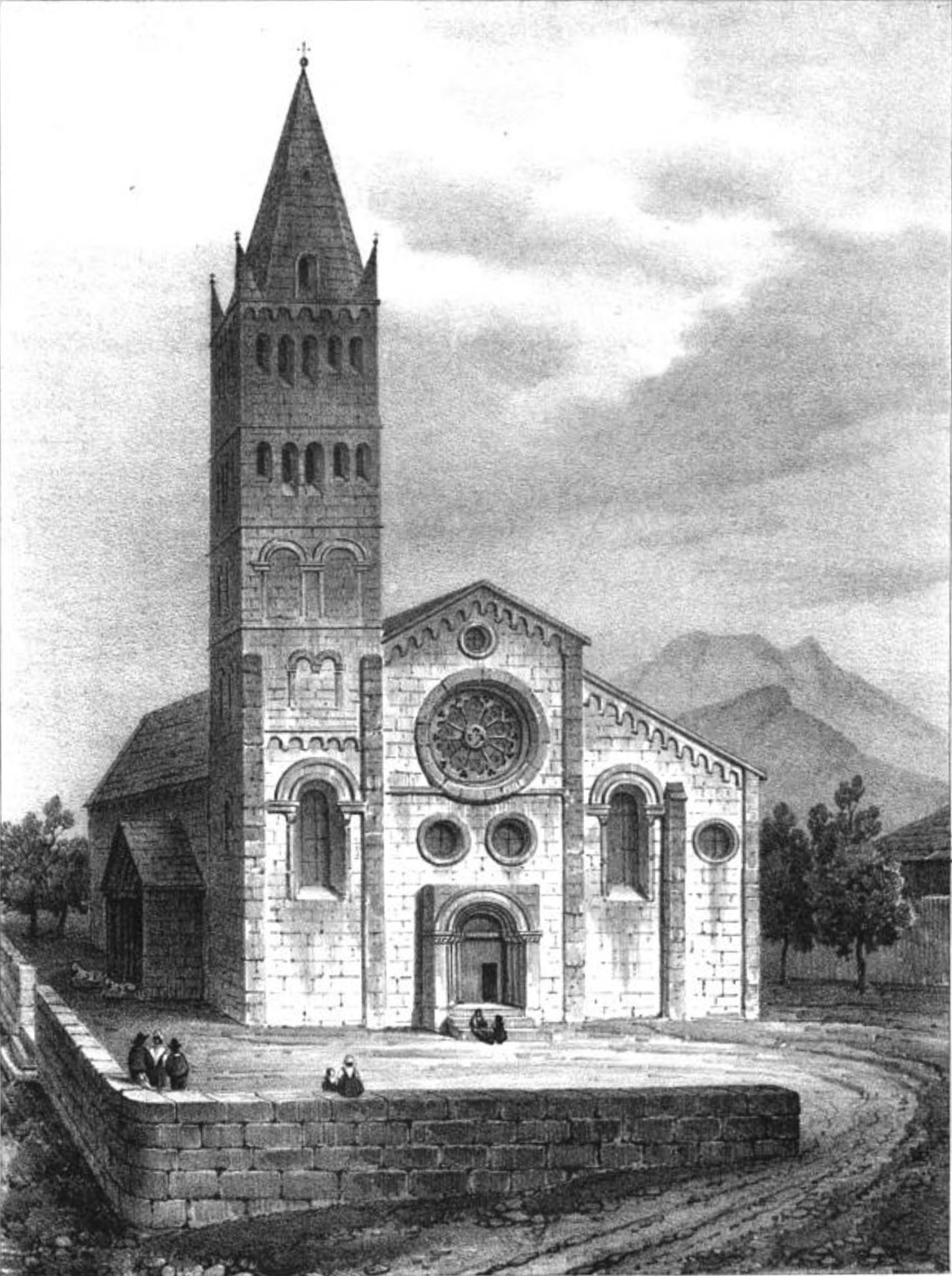
Cathédrale Notre-Dame d'Embrun.

Ignatius Cazeneuve (1747 in Gap, France – 18 May 1806 at the parish of St. Andrew in Gap) was a constitutional bishop and French politician during the French Revolution. Ignace de Caseneuve of Gap was elected the constitutional bishop of Hautes Alpes on 8 March 1791. He had been a cathedral canon but had gained notoriety as a member of the City Council of Gap in July 1790.

== Early life ==
He was born in Gap in 1747.

== Bishop ==
His predecessor as Archbishop of Embrun, Pierre-Louis Leysin opposed the Civil Constitution of the Clergy decided by the decree of 12 July 1790 and refused to take the oath of allegiance. Ignatius Cazeneuve canon of Gap Cathedral was appointed constitutional bishop of Hautes-Alpes department in March 1791 to replace him and was crowned in Paris on 3 April. Pierre-Louis Leyssin, driven from Embrun, took refuge in the Sardinian States and was excommunicated. Jacques-Joseph Rous of Mazelière, vicar-general of the former archbishop became the de facto head of the diocese, until he also was deported. Ignatius Cazeneuve, however, resigned and was replaced by André Garnier on 10 January 1800 in Aix. After signing the Concordat, Cazeneuve retracted his oath and died six years later in 1806, reconciled with the Catholic Church.

== Politician ==
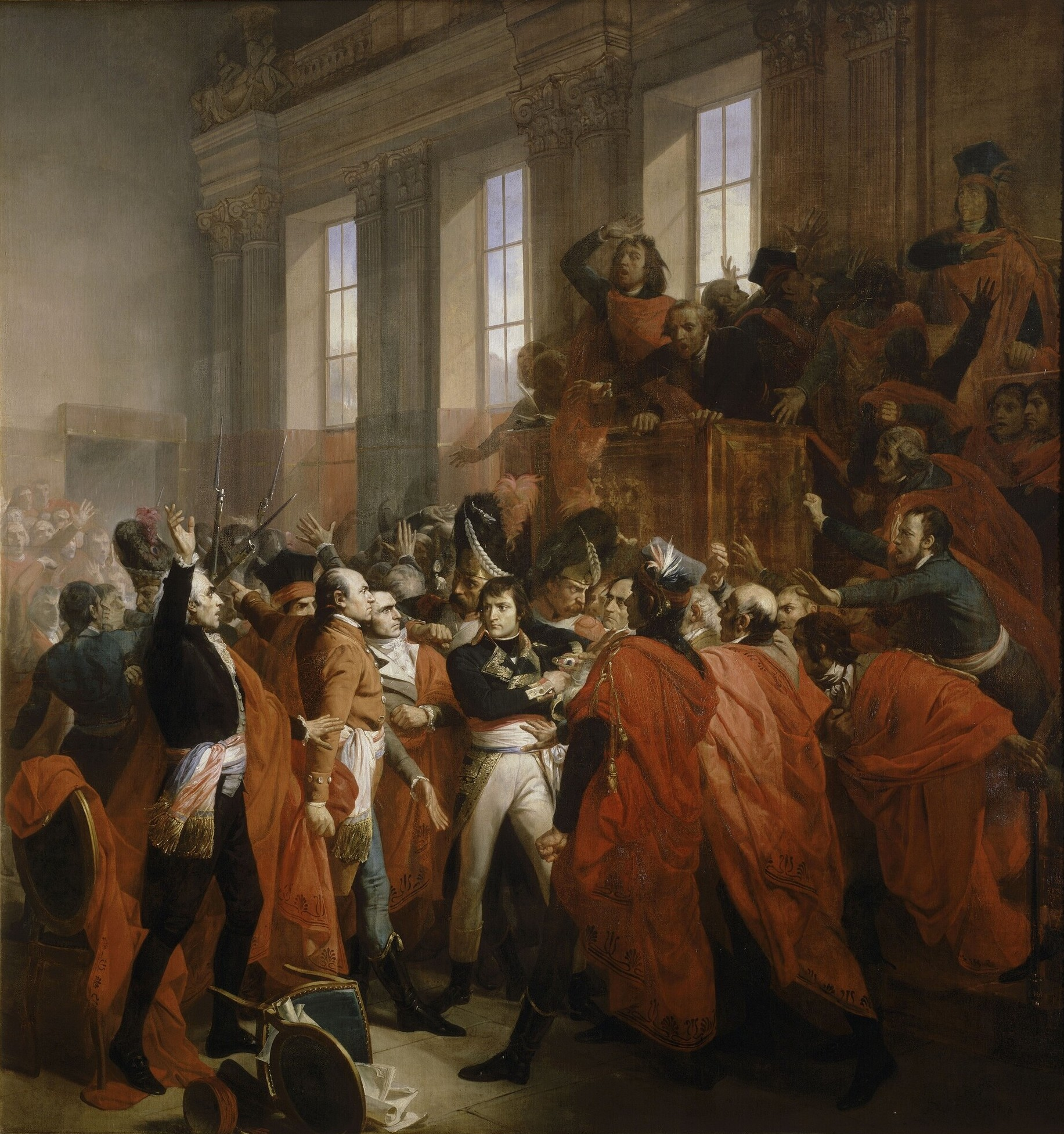
Bonaparte at the Council of Five Hundred at Saint-Cloud by François Bouchot

Ignatius Cazeneuve was elected to the Convention in March 1791 and was elected as a member for the French Alps in September 1792 until March 1798. He has served on the Plain benches.

However, he denounced also the excesses of the Revolution. During this period, 14 February 1793, he works with the administrator responsible for monitoring the sale of national assets, but in this role helped support his nephew Stephen Gregory Cazeneuve, then captain of grenadiers of the battalion of the French Alps.

He spoke in the trial of Louis XVI for the "detention and banishment" of the king and then made part of the council of five hundred.
