= Honoré du Laurens =

Archbishop of Embrun in south-eastern France

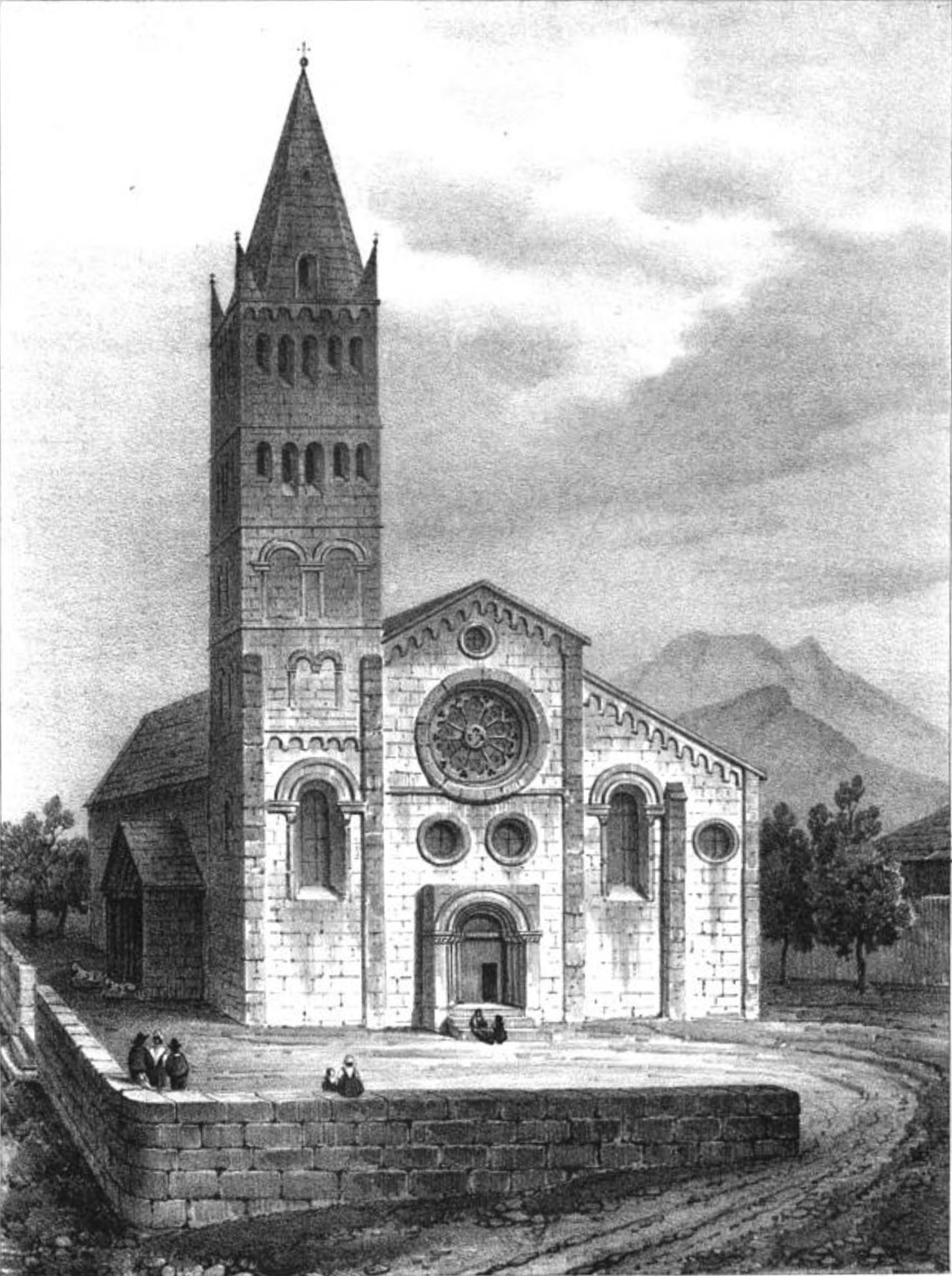
Embrun Cathedral

Honoré du Laurens (7 March 1554 – 24 January 1612) was archbishop of Embrun in south-eastern France.

== Biography ==
Honoré du Laurens was born in Tarascon, the eldest of the eleven children (ten of whom reached adulthood) of Louis du Laurens (born in Puget near Chambéry), and his wife Louise de Castellan (born in Riez).

His father was a doctor, first in Tarascon and then in Arles, who was greatly devoted to the education of his children. One of Honoré's brothers, André, was physician to King Henri IV. Another of his brothers, Gaspard de Laurens, was Archbishop of Arles, and a third, Jean (Jérôme in religion), Provincial Superior of the Capuchins.

Honoré's uncle and godfather, Honoré de Castellan, who was doctor to Charles IX, paid for his nephew's education and left him money in his will. He studied medicine, according to family tradition, but reluctantly. Eventually he became a student of law, at which he excelled.

Honoré married in Aix. His wife, née d'Ulme, gave him a daughter but died in 1600. He was General Counsel to the parliament of Provence, where he succeeded his father-in-law, M. d'Ulme. He joined the Catholic League.

His brother André, thanks to his high standing at court, was able to obtain for him the appointment to the Archbishopric of Embrun, which had fallen vacant on the death of Guillaume d'Avançon. Honoré refused the appointment and with the secret hope of finding a way of avoiding the episcopate, made his way to Rome, where he hid in a Capuchin friary, until the Pope threatened him with excommunication to compel him to leave this retreat and accept the archbishopric.

In 1611 in Paris he gave the funeral oration of Margaret of Austria, wife of King Philip III of Spain, and died, also in Paris, in the following year.

== Selected works ==
- Panégyrique de l'Henoticon ou édict de Henry III, roy de France et de Poloigne sur la réunion de ses subjets à l'Eglise catholique, 1588
- Discours et rapport véritable de la conférence tenue entre les Deputez de la part de Monsieur le duc de Mayenne, lieutenant général de l'Estat et Coronne de France, Princes, prélats et Estats généraux assemblez à Paris, avec les députez de Messieurs les Princes, Prélats, seigneurs et autres catholiques estans du party du Roy de Navarre, Paris, J. Parant, 1593
- in the same year, another edition, by J. Oudot, and an edition in Latin

== Bibliography ==
- Jeanne du Laurens [sister of Honoré]: Une famille au XVIe siècle disponible sur Gallica, with introduction and notes by Charles de Ribbe:3rd edition, Paris, J. Albanel, 1868

Catholic Church titles
Preceded by Guillaume d'Avançon	Archbishop of Embrun; 1601-1612	Succeeded by Guillaume d'Hugues
