= Bernardin-François Fouquet =

French archbishop of Embrun

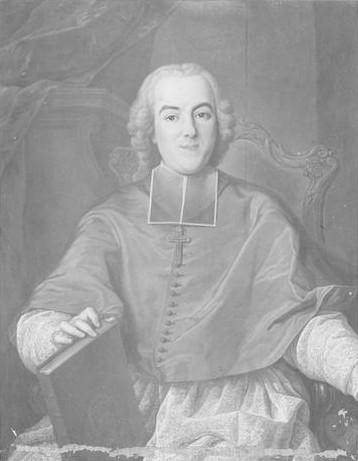
Portrait of Bernardin-François Fouquet (1705-1785), archbishop of Embrun (1740-1767).

Bernardin François Fouquet (French: [bɛʁnaʁdɛ̃ fʁɑ̃swa fukɛ]; 8 January 1705, Rennes – 20 April 1785, Paris) was a French Catholic prelate, abbot and archbishop of Embrun from 1740 to 1767.

== Family ==
Bernardin François Fouquet was the son of René-François Fouquet La Bonne Bouchefolière and his wife Suzanne Gentile. He came from a collateral line of the family of Nicolas Fouquet and is a distant relative of Marshal Charles Louis Auguste Fouquet.

== Career ==
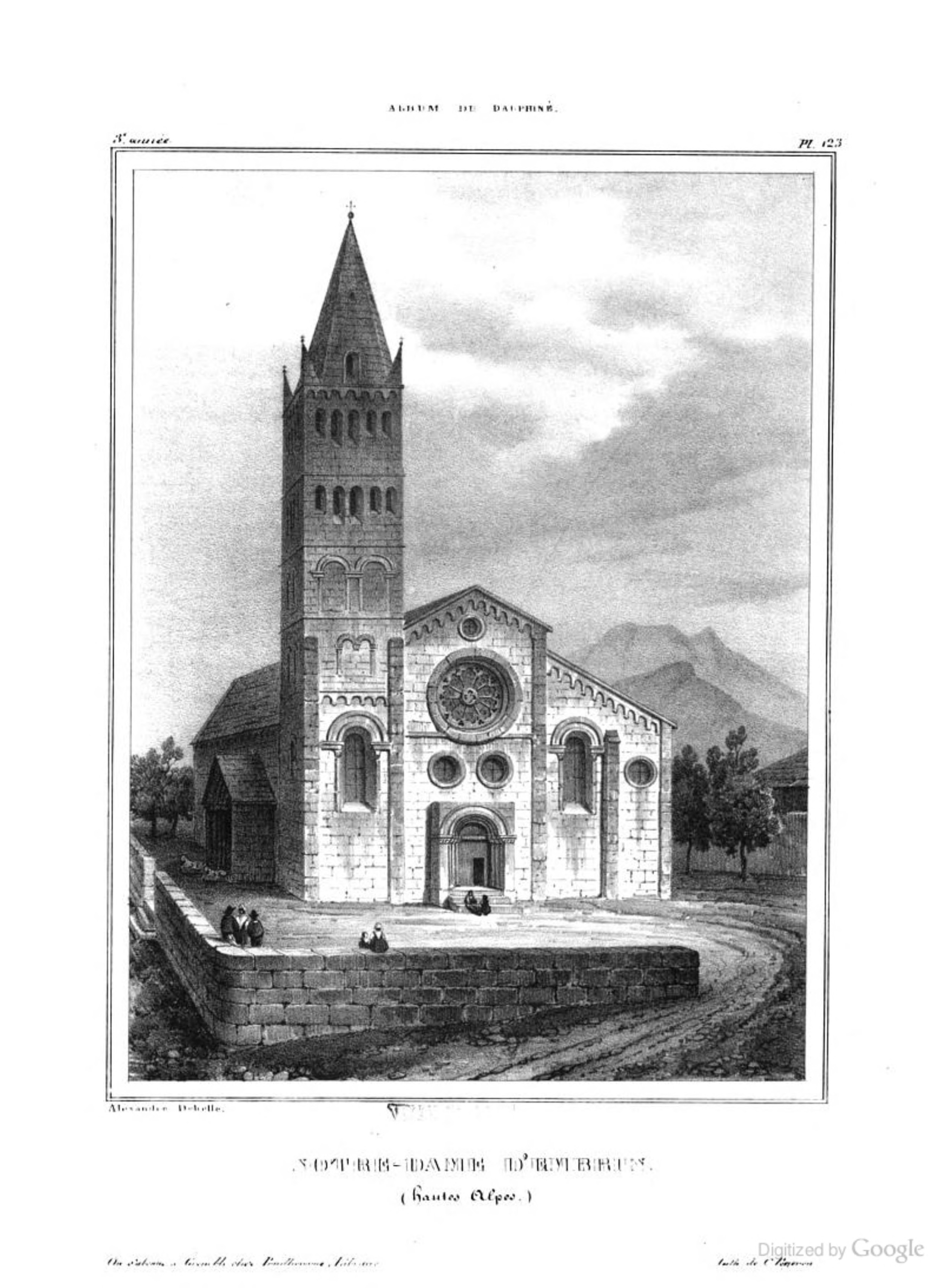
Cathédrale Notre-Dame d'Embrun.

Destined to an ecclesiastical career, he studied and became a doctor of theology and received as stipend from the church Combes. Oblate of St. Benedict in Narbonne in April 1727, he was abbot of the Abbey of St. Peter and St. Paul de Caunes from the 27th of the same month. He was a general agent of the clergy of France appointed by the Province of Toulouse from 25 May 1735 to 1740

After 35 years he was appointed to, Archbishop of Embrun on 5 December 1740 after taking an oath to the king. He was dedicated on 8 January 1741 by Gilbert Gaspard de Montmorin Saint-Hérem, Bishop-Comte of Langres and Cardinal Étienne-René Potier de Gesvres, Bishop of Beauvais. As Archbishop of Embrun, he carried the title of "Prince and Chamberlain of the Holy Roman Empire."

After twenty five years of episcopate without highlight except his piety, his health had "altered because of the climate of the Alps", he resigned his archbishopric on 17 April 1767, after a bequeath from 3000 pounds to the Ladies hospital in Grenoble. He receives commendation of the Abbey of Saint-Pierre de la Couture in the diocese of Le Mans.

He died in Paris on 25 May 1785.

Catholic Church titles
Preceded by Pierre Guérin de Tencin	Bishop of Embrun; 1741–1767	Succeeded by Pierre-Louis de Leyssin
