= Rame =

"Rame" is a rare word in English which means branch. Rame is also the name of two villages in Cornwall:

Rame may also refer to:

== Geography ==
- Rame, Maker-with-Rame, in southeast Cornwall
  - Rame Head, a coastal headland near the first of these, as well as the Rame Peninsula
- Rame, Wendron, towards the southwest of Cornwall
- Rame, Estonia, village in Hanila Parish, Lääne County, Estonia
- Rame Head (Victoria) in Australia
- Rameh, a village in Northern Israel
- Rama (Gaul), an ancient town in Gaul near La Roche-de-Rame

== Other ==
- Rame (album)
- "Rame", a single by German eurodance group Snap!
- Rame, the name of a fictional alien race created by Redmond A. Simonsen for the science fiction board wargaming titles Starforce: Alpha Centauri and StarSoldier, published by Simulations Publications, Inc. copyrights 1974 and 1977 respectively.
- RAME, the newsgroup rec.arts.movies.erotica and website rame.net, creator and host of the Internet Adult Film Database
