= André du Laurens =

French physician

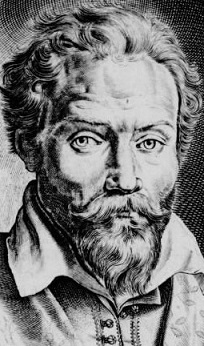
André du Laurens

André du Laurens (December 9, 1558 – August 6, 1609) was a French physician.

== Biography ==
Du Laurens was born in Tarascon and was rector of the medical school at Montpellier. He was physician to King Henry IV.

His 1594 book comprising four "discourses"—first written in French, not Latin—was an early attempt at scientific communication. It was translated into English by Richard Surphlet in 1599.

His Historia anatomica underwent many editions.

One of his brothers, Honoré du Laurens (1564-1612), was archbishop of Embrun.

== Bibliography ==
=== Selection ===
- Admonitio ad Simonem Petræum (1593)
- Discours de la conservation de la veuë: des maladies melancoliques: des catarrhes, & de la vieillesse (1594)
  - 1598 and 1600 editions on Gallica; Radu Suciu's edition with an extensive critical apparatus (2012)
  - A discourse of the preservation of the sight of melancholike diseases of rheumes and of old age by Andre DuLaurens, translated by Richard Surphlet (1599)—The eyehistory.wordpress.com digitization includes only the first discourse.
- Apologia pro Galeno et impugnatio novæ ac falsæ demonstrationis de communione vasorum cordis in foetu (1595)
- De crisibus libri tres (1596)
- Historia anatomica humani corporis. Paris (1600)
  - 1602 edition on Google Books
  - L’histoire anatomique en laquelle toutes les parties du corps humain sont amplement déclarées enrichie de controverses et observations nouvelles, translated by Francois Size. Paris: Jean Bertault (1610)
  - Historia anatomica: controuersiis, obseruationibus et posterioribus curis authoris adornata (1650)—With additions by Lazare Meyssonnier.

=== Complete works ===
- Toutes les œuvres de Me André Du Laurens, sieur de Ferrières. Paris, 1621 on Google Books (in French)—Translation by Théophile Gelée, at least partly revised by the author.
- Patin, Gui, ed., Opera omnia, partim iam antea excusa, partim nondum edita, nunc simil collecta, & ad infinitis mendis repurgata at Google Books (1628) (in Latin)—Complete revised works, some not published before.
