= Vincent, Orontius, and Victor =

Saints Vincent, Orontius, and Victor
- Born: Cimiez (Vincent and Orontius)
- Died: c. 305 AD; Puigcerda
- Venerated in: Roman Catholic Church; Orthodox Church
- Canonized: Pre-Congregation
- Feast: January 22 (Roman Catholic and Orthodox Churches); November 11 (Orthodox Church), additionally

Saints Vincent, Orontius, and Victor (d. 305 AD) are venerated as martyrs by the Roman Catholic and Orthodox Churches. Tradition states that Vincent and Orontius were brothers from Cimiez. They were Christians who evangelized in the Pyrenees and were killed at Puigcerda with Saint Victor.

Vincent should not be confused with the more famous Vincent of Saragossa, who is honored on the same feast day.

== Veneration ==
Their relics were enshrined at Embrun, in a sanctuary built by Palladius of Embrun.
