= Abbey of Saint-Pierre de la Couture =

Abbey in Sarthe, France

Coordinates: 48.0018°N 0.2000°E

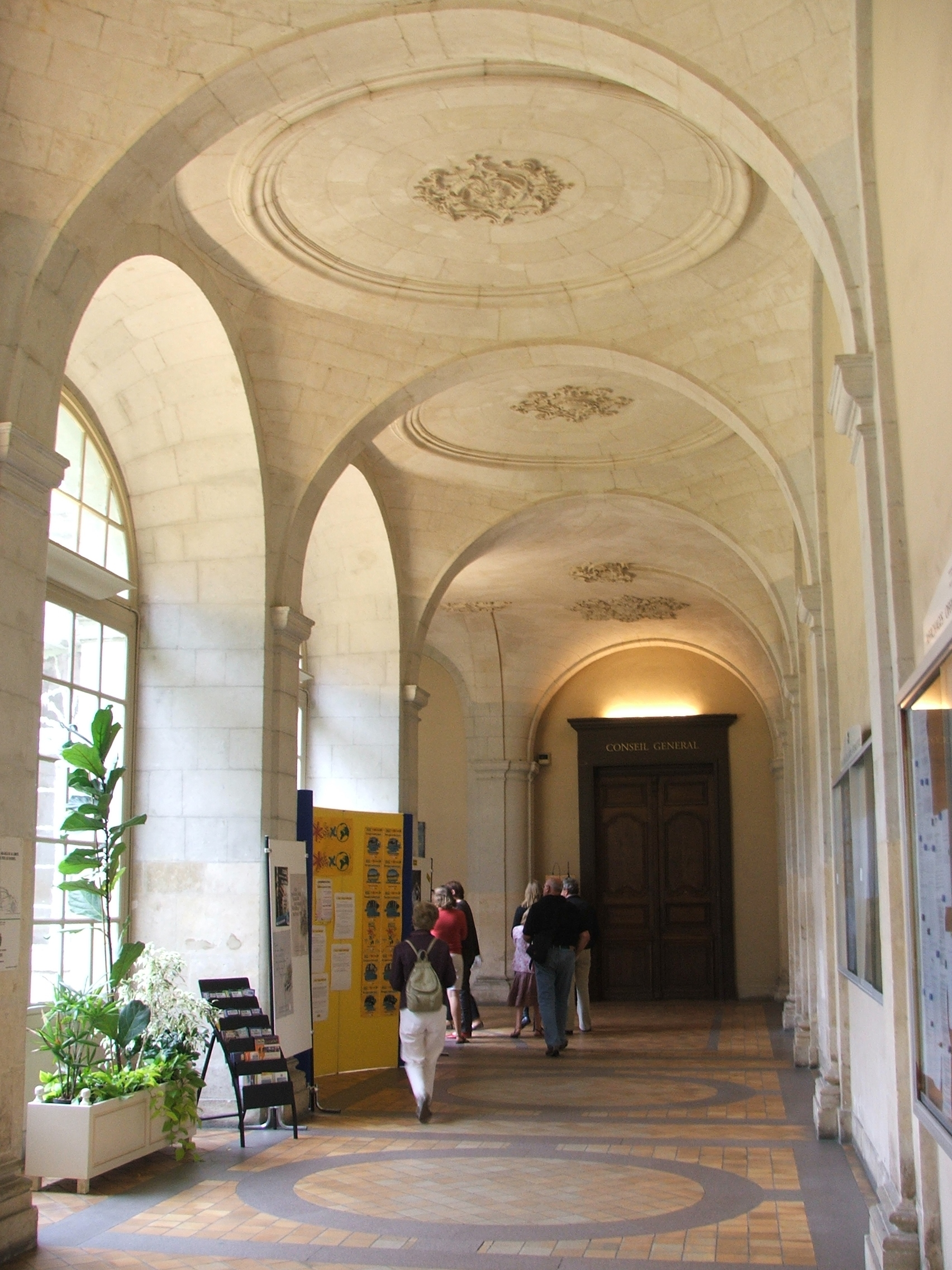
The former cloister

Abbey of Saint-Pierre de la Couture (French: Abbaye Saint-Pierre de la Couture) was a Benedictine monastery in Le Mans. All that survives of it is the abbey church and some of the abbey buildings; the latter date to a rebuild between 1760 and 1775 and are now used to house the prefecture for Sarthe. Dating to the 11th century, the monastery was considered one of the most powerful in western France before the French Revolution.

== History ==
=== Foundation ===
The founder of the abbey was Saint Bertrand, Bishop of Le Mans from 586 to 616, who founded the monastery "de la couture" in honour of Peter and Paul. The name couture or cultura was chosen because of the cultivated fields that surrounded the monastery at the time. From the 10th century onwards, the term took on the meaning of cultura dei: worship of God. At that time, the city's inhabitants had taken refuge behind the defensive walls. Only the suburb of Saint-Nicolas was then a modest place to live on this side of the Sarthe. In local folklore, the Archangel Michael is said to have come down to earth to indicate the precise place of creation in Saint-Bertrand. The rural area was then located about 600 metres south of the end of the Gallo-Roman wall. The monastery quickly amassed a significant amount of land, starting in Maine with donations from local lords. But these possessions spread throughout France. The most famous were located in Bordeaux, Provence, Burgundy, and especially in England. Of these foreign possessions, the abbey always kept a symbol. The coat of arms of the abbey has always taken the double colours of the fleur-de-lis of the Kingdom of France and the three English lions.

A small town was formed between the suburb of Saint-Nicolas and the abbey. This is now the centre of the city. However, the hyper-centre, as we know it (Place Saint-Nicolas and not Place de la République) remains several hundred metres from the abbey.

However, the 9th and 10th centuries were not to the advantage of the religious. They were subjected to the law of the new secular lords, the Counts of Maine and were soon attacked by the Normans. The abbey was partially destroyed and its cultural possessions were burned. Gauzbert rebuilt the abbey of Saint-Pierre de la Couture in 990, supported this time by Hugues I, Count of Maine, in agreement with Avesgaud, Bishop of Le Mans. Although attracted by the Cluniac movement, Gauzday did not depend on it. However, like the Order of Cluny, La Couture tried as much as it could to guarantee its independence from the lordly and even episcopal powers. Above all, the bishopric of Le Mans, which was one of the most powerful in France because of its size, and also because of its financial capacities. The abbey tried, like many others, to place itself under the direct authority of the Pope. The abbey had to face a significant number of trials against local lords. If donations were important for the abbey at that time, it was mainly because it recovered land lost during conflicts or usurped by secular lords. With these recoveries, the abbey rebuilt the abbey church in the 11th and 12th centuries.

Around 1010, Geoffroy, Lord of Sablé, gave the monks of the Abbey of La Couture in Le Mans the church of Solesmes and its attached farm, thus creating Solesmes Abbey.

At the beginning of the 12th century, the abbey owned 30,000 hectares of land, this time collected in the Le Mans region. In 1288, Charles, Count of Anjou and Maine, grants rights to hold two fairs each year to the monks of LaCouture, on their domain of Moullins. It also has a number of other priories. During an outbreak of the plague which struck Le Mans in 1515, Dom Michel Bureau sent part of the community to shelter in Volnay Priory and took the others, including all the dignitaries to Moullins. Couture became the most powerful abbey in Maine and one of the largest in the whole kingdom. In 1399, abbots of La Couture were endowed with the dignity of bishops, with mitre, ring and cross. The churches of the city and the suburbs are subject to the authority of the abbey. But the Hundred Years' War soon caused much destruction to the abbey and its many priories. In the 14th and 15th centuries, the periods of English occupation were the most destructive. L'Épau Abbey was burned down to prevent the enemy from taking refuge there. However, it is also during this period that its autonomy is strengthened.

=== Decline ===
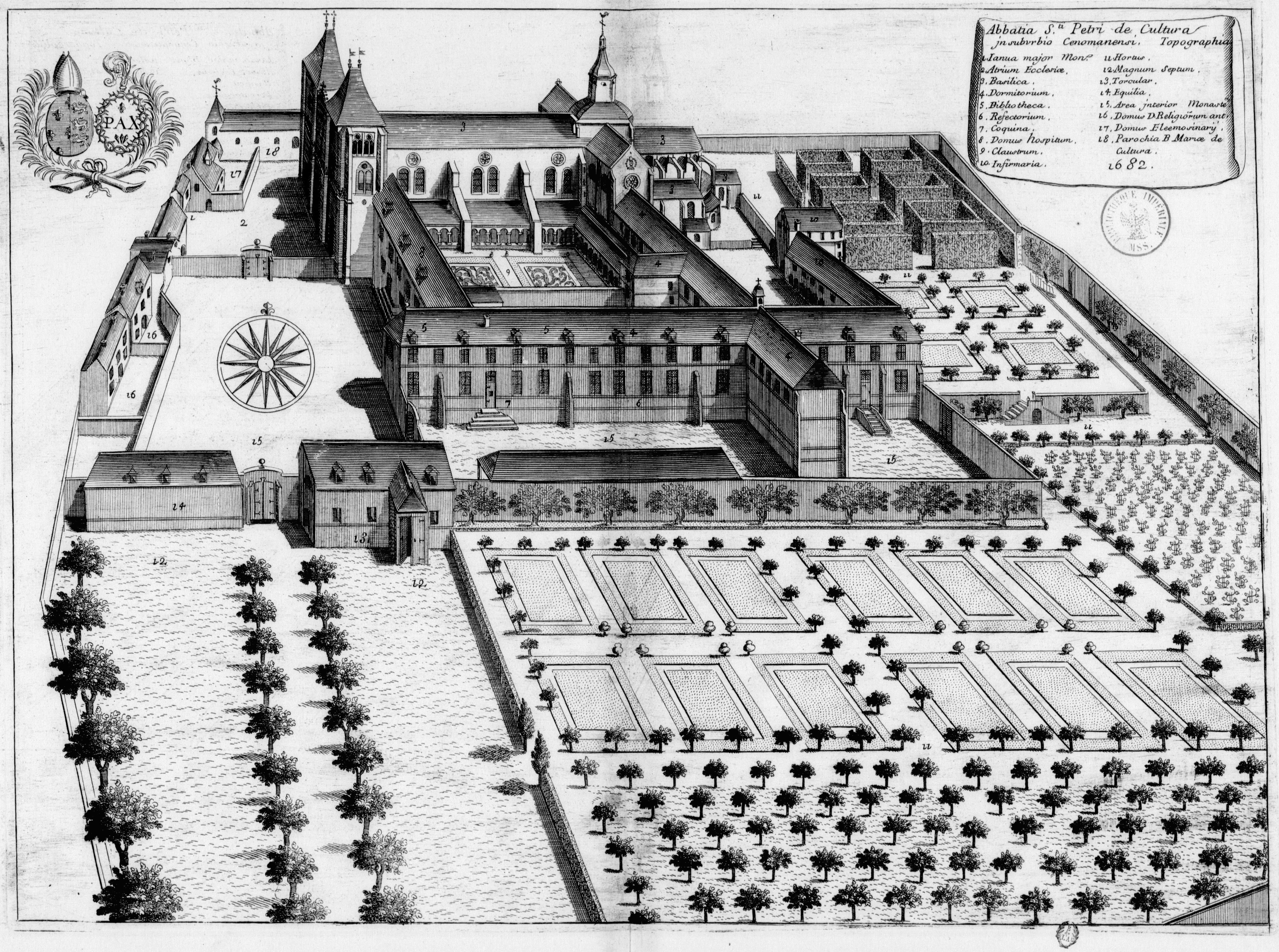
Abbaye de la couture XVIIè siècle

By 1518, it was again declining. First, abbots were now appointed by royal authority, which threatened the autonomy of the abbey. The abbots received the income due to them but did not perform the spiritual function for which they were responsible. This new system, the result of the Concordat of Bologna of 1516, allowed the king much more control of the clergy. Martin Fournier de Beaume, son of the Minister of Finance, replaced the monks at the "Maison de l'Etoile in Paris, with his mother and sister. Upon the capture of Le Mans by the Protestants in 1562, the congregations of the 7 monasteries of Le Mans had to flee. Nicolas Fumée resettled that of La Couture in Moullins. He housed his monks in nearby manor houses belonging to Moullins.

King Henry IV stayed in the abbey during the siege of Le Mans against the league on November 28, 1589. As early as 1657, Maurists were asked to reform the monastery. But the monks were against this. It was a renewal for the abbey in the second half of the 16th century; but its autonomy was non-existent, quite the opposite of before its establishment. She is integrated into the congregation appointing abbots for three years and now only a pawn in the great Congregation of Saint-Maur. It was also the time of the most violent tensions with the other "great" abbey of Le Mans: the abbey of Saint-Vincent, favoured by the Maurists. Much destruction was caused during the Religious Wars, not to mention the fires that partially damaged it. In 1760, the abbey was rebuilt, and by the eve of the Revolution, the abbey was extremely powerful, owning more than 6,000 hectares of land, 33 priories and 224 farms (plus 18 mills). It was already proposed to transform the buildings into a library. But after the concordat between Napoleon and Pius VII, the abbey church became a parish church.

The reconstruction of 1760 made it a remarkably large building for the small community of twenty-four that resided there. Although the initial project was even more gigantic in scope, the church stopped the reconstruction in light of the small congregation willing to live in the monastery. For example, the project was to open 21 windows on the main building and only 15 windows were finally created. The original monastery consisted of a main building located parallel to the nave to the south and two perpendicular wings running west of the South Tower of Notre-Dame and east of the south crossroads of its transept. The central space is divided in two by a kind of intermediate building giving to the north the cloister and to the south the kitchen courtyard. The plan was hardly more innovative than that of the old abbey, but it extended the east wing and the south wing to the north.

== List of abbots ==
=== Abbots ===
- 1.Gausbert, - † 15 October 1005 at Bourgueil, also abbé de Saint-Julien de Tours, Maillezais, Bourgueil (990) et Marmoutier (1001).
- 2.Ingelbaud, (1010 – 1015)
- 3.Evrard
- 4.Ascelin, 1050
- 5.Renaud Ier, (1072 – 1074)
- 6.Johel
- 7.Renaud II, 1080
- 8.Johel, (1094 - †1097)
- 9.Eudes de Buris, (1111 – 1112)
- 10.Renaud III, 1121
- 11.Guillaume Ier, 1133
- 12.Foulques, 1133
- 13.Ursion, (1143 – 1158)
- 14.Geoffroy Ier, (1164 – 1167)
- 15.Laurent, (1170 – 1171)
- 16.André, 1175
- 17.Richard, 1184
- 18.Thomas,
- 19.Robert, (1195 - 1205)
- 20.Geoffroi Bérillaut, † 6 août 1210, murdered by Lord Hamelin of La Faigne.
- 21.Guérin, (1211 - 1218)
- 22.Jean Ier, (1218 – 1219)
- 23.Pierre Ier de Brissent, (1220 – 1225)
- 24.Hamelin, (1229 – 1248)
- 25.Jacques Ier, (1261 - 1267)
- 26.Robert II, 1270
- 27.Jacques II, (1282 – 1292)
- 28.Gervais, (1296 - † 5 October 1311)
- 29.Hugues Gaudin, (7 November 1311 - † 15 August 1324)
- 30.Jean II du Coudray, (27 August 1324 – † 12 October 1343), first Prior of Loue.
- 31.Geoffroy de Coëtmoisan, (August 1343 – 30 November 1380) appointed in 1352 Bishop of Cornwall, then Bishop of Dol (1357)
- 32.Jean III, (1352 – 1359)
- 33.Mathieu de Juillé, (1362 – 1374)
- 34.Pascal Huguenot, (1386 - † 3 October 1399), doctor of law, former abbot of Lonlay (1370).
- 35.Guillaume Patri, (Octobre 1399 - † 15 septembre 1409), former Prior of Solesmes since 1362.
- 36.Guy de Baïf, 1409 elected in 1412 abbot of S. Aubin d'Angers, where he died on November 6, 1442.
- 37.Jean IV Chevalier, 1417, with a bachelor's degree in decrees.
- 38.Alain Le Doyen, 1420 – resigned in 1438, died on February 9 of the following year.
- 39.Gérard de Lorière, (1439 - † 19 June 1461)
- 40.Guillaume II Le Monnier, (1461 – † 9 December 1465)
- 41.Jean V de Tucé, (1465 - 1485), in opposition to a commendatory abbot, Guillaume de Malestroit, who gives up his place in exchange for a pension.
- 42.Mathieu de la Motte, (1486 – resigned in 1492)
- 43.Guillaume III Herbelin, (1492 - † 1496)
- 44.Michel Bureau, (1496 - † 6 June 1518, doctor of theology
- 45.Jean Bougler, 1518, Prior of Solesmes from 1505 to his death on April 11, 1556, aged 75

=== Commendatory abbots ===
- 46. Jean Calluau ou Colluant, 1518 - † 29 June 1522, canon of Saintes, then of Angoulême, also abbot of La Couronne (1515), bishop of Senlis from 1517 to his death.
- 46. Martin Fournier de Beaume, 1524 - † 2 July 1527, Archbishop of Tours from 1521 to his death.
- 48. Adam Fumée, 1530, resigned in 1546 and switched to Protestantism.
- 49. Nicolas Fumée, 1546, resigned in 1575 to assume the bishopric of Beauvais, nephew of the previous one, first canon of Paris, master of the King's chapel (1587), also abbot of Beaulieu-lès-Loches (1584), died in Chartres on 3 March 1593.
- 50. Charles Ier de Bourbon, cardinal de Vendôme, 1575, resigned in 1580, son of Charles de Bourbon and Françoise d'Alençon, also bishop of Nevers, of Saintes, then archbishop of Rouen and bishop of Beauvais, also abbot of Jumièges, Saint-Wandrille, Saint-Germain-des-Près, Corbie, Vendôme, Saint-Lucien, S.Michel-en-l'Herm, La Clarté-Dieu, Beaulieu-lès-Le-Mans, les Châtelliers, S.Etienne de Dijon, Montebourg, etc. uncle of Henri IV and proclaimed king of France under the name of Charles X by the League after the death of Henri III, he died captive in the castle of Fontenay-le-Comte on May 9, 1590.
- 51. Charles II de Bourbon, second cardinal of Vendôme, 1580 - † July 30, 1594, nephew of the previous one, archbishop of Rouen (1582), appointed cardinal by Gregory XIII on December 12, 1583, also abbot of Saint-Germain-des-Prés, S. Lucien de Beauvais, Bourgueil, Jumièges, Corbie...
- 52. Michel Dionneau, 1594, resigned in 1602, priest of Le Mans.
- 53. Jean ou Michel Legay, November 1602 - 1604, cleric of Paris, adviser to the King.
- 54. Léonore d'Étampes de Valençay, 27 July 1605, Bishop of Chartres (June 3, 1620), then Archbishop of Reims (December 16, 1641), also abbot of S. Martin de Pontoise, Bourgueil (1605–44), Beaulieu-lès-Loches, l'Epine, Vaas, Champagne, L'Epau, la Cour-Dieu and La Pelice, died in Paris on Holy Saturday, April 8, 1651, at the age of 62.
- 55. Balthazar Poitevin, 1620 – † 1632, also confidential abbot on behalf of the Count of Soissons de Jumièges, S. Oüen de Rouen and S. Michel-en-l'Herm.
- 56. Jean-Baptiste de Croisilles, 1632, deposed filed in 1637 for having married in secret, adviser to the King, also confidential abbot of S. Ouen de Rouen (1632–39), Jumièges (1632–38) and S. Michel-en-L'Herm (1636–37).
- 57. Guillaume de Montagne, (1638 – 1640)
- 58. Nicolas de Conty-Gramont, grandson of the Prince de Condé killed in Jarnac, also abbot of Bassac (1629) although Calvinist, died in 1648.
- 59. Henri-Louis Chasteigner de La Roche-Posay, 1644 - died of apoplexy on July 30, 1651, at Dissay at the age of 74, Bishop of Poitiers (1611), Knight of the Order of the Holy Spirit, also Abbot of S. Cyran (1616–20), S. Cyprien de Poitiers and Nanteuil-en-Vallée (ca 1595).
- 60. Eugène-Maurice de Savoie, 2 octobre 1651 – resigned in 1657 to marry Olympe Mancini, niece of Cardinal Mazarin.
- 61.Louis-Henri de Bourbon, chevalier de Soissons, 1669 - 1683, died in 1703 at the age of 63.
- 62. Philippe de Savoie, also abbot of the Gard, S. Médard de Soissons and Corbie (ca 1669), died on October 5, 1693.
- 63. Louis Bouton de Chamilly, December 1694 - † 1705.
- 64. François de Caillebot de la Salle, 1705 - Doctor of Theology, Bishop of Tournai (1690-1705), also Abbot of Plaimpied (1680) and Rebais (1672), where he died on December 21, 1736, at the age of 83.
- 65. Martin-Maurice de Lossendière, ... – 1728, then abbot of Saint-Maur-sur-Loire until 1754
- 66. Charles-Louis de Froullay de Tessé, 26 November 1728 - † 31 January 1767 in Le Mans at the age of 80, Canon Count of Lyon (1708), Bishop of Le Mans (October 17, 1723), Chaplain to the King, former abbot of Saint-Maur-sur-Loire (1721).
- 67. Bernardin-François Fouquet, 1767 - † 20 April 1785 at the age of 80 in Paris, in his hotel on rue du Bac, distant cousin of the famous Superintendent, doctor of theology of Sorbonne (1732), vicar general of the diocese of Noyon, general agent of the clergy of France for the province of Toulouse (1735), archbishop of Embrun (17 September 1740-resigned on 17 April 1767), former abbot of Caunes-Minervois.
- 68. Louis-Sylvestre de La Chatre, 1785 – 1790, first lieutenant of carabinieri before entering the orders in 1774, vicar general of the diocese of Nevers (1786), ordinary chaplain of King Louis XVIII (1814), bishop of Beauvais (1817-22), canon of Saint-Denis (1822), died in Paris on 5 February 1829 at the age of 75.

== Secular use ==
The French Revolution (1789) led to the departure of the monks and the eventual occupation of the abbey by departmental services of the revolutionary government. The decree of 11 February 1791 officially authorizes the departmental (and local, urban) administration to meet in council. From the beginning of the prefecture, this building was assigned to it. The historical hall of the General Council, where the first council took place on July 20, 1790, is still in use today. However, the abbey did not only serve as a prefecture. For hundreds of years, it housed a library and archives even before it became an archaeological museum. It was even used as official accommodation for some civil servants in the public administration. But as these services multiplied, and despite the size of the space available, cohabitation caused a generalized overload of the building. The buildings were then extensively reworked to gain space and play on a spatial extension that did not excessively alter the aesthetics of the buildings. This was partially a failure with the closure of the cloister and the creation of the intermediate floors.

== 20th century ==
The beginning of the 20th century marks the end of the bottleneck. The archives were soon transferred to the Abbey of Saint-Vincent. These archives had already required several extensions of rooms located in the mezzanine in 1853, then annexed a new basement of the abbey in 1856. In 1907, the situation was critical with 1,848 linear metres of shelves and 30 cubic metres of paper piled up. The archivist in charge at the time, Julien L'Hermitte, made requests and finally obtained the move in 1908. The move did not take place until 3 years later, at the end of September 1911. The archives wandered around the city for a long time before finding a specially prepared anchor point in Pontlieue in 2002. In addition to the archives, several rooms were used in the 18th century to store the archaeological and pictorial collections of the Le Mans museums. This was also the case at Saint-Pierre la Cour Collegiate Church and at the Palace of the Counts of Maine. in 1927, everything was moved to the hotel of Tesse. The same applies to the Town Hall services that were moved to the Palace of the Counts of Maine. As for the modest library, which had never ceased to grow, it was sent to rue Gambetta in the Halles district in 1931. In 1934, a new wing was created east of the southern one. On 21 November 1959, the gallery, cloister and grand staircase were classified as historic monuments1. In addition, in 1960, the former grounds of the abbey, located on Chanzy Street, allowed the creation of the administrative city. Once the square has returned, there is finally some thought of restoring the premises, especially thanks to the new subsidies obtained due to the historic monuments label. This work began as soon as the city administrative offices were moved; it was entrusted to the architect Jean-Louis Lagrange. The east wing and the cloister are the first to benefit from it, followed by the hall and the main staircase. In 1961, the main staircase was completely redone. As for the abbey's enclosure, 2.8 ha in size, it was used not only to install the city administration, but also to build the Berthelot College or Victor Hugo Park. Today, the former abbey is only open to the general public once or twice a year for guided tours and thematic tours. On 11 July 1975, all the buildings excluding the modern north-west wing and the parts already classified were listed as historic monuments.

== Church of Notre-Dame de la Couture ==
Classified as a historical monument by the 1841 list, this church faces directly across from the current boulevard René-Levasseur. Unlike the abbey, which is now secondary to the boulevard, the church is more imposing and more directly accessible. It is in Gothic style and its full name is Notre-Dame-de-la-Couture. The suffix "sewing" does not refer to the action of "sewing" but comes from "culture". The full Latin name of the abbey was proof of this: Cenobium Sancti Petri dicitur ad culturam. Such a name was given to it in order to distinguish the abbey church and the complete monastery from the other church of Saint Peter within the walls: Saint Peter the Court, that being the court of the Counts of Maine. The name "culture" seems to have disappeared as early as the 16th century.

=== The crypt of Saint-Bertrand ===
The abbey was destroyed by the Vikings in 865. The ruins were not discovered until 1002 by Gauzbert. It was in the 10th century that the abbey church took on the importance it is now known for. Gauzbert voluntarily built a large abbey church, already foreseeing the importance that the abbey would acquire on the regional and national level. It is already composed of a crypt half buried, the place where its first founder is buried. It is divided into three small naves separated by eight pillars aligned in two rows of four. The choir is elevated above the crypt and is surrounded by ten strong columns and pillars, all of which are topped by semicircular arches. The walls are pierced with windows and the apse is made of the cul de four. Around the choir was built a vaulted ambulatory with ridges and five absidioles arranged like a fan. Between the chapels, there is an arched window made of either bricks or stones. The construction site was completed and opened to the public in the 11th century. A vaulted transept will then be added. If it no longer exists, we can imagine it by the presence of period pillars on each arm. They end in a chapel, also on the bottom of the oven. To the west, the building has three naves. The most important is the one in the centre, 8 metres wide as an extension of the choir. The other two follow the ambulatory. The aisles are composed of seven communicating bays. Each has a wall decorated with four arcades carved into the thickness of the wall. Above the aisles, fourteen windows are drilled, one per bay. Each aisle was dug with a bay leading to the nave. Although this was exceptional, the construction took into account the fact that the public could come to attend the services. That is why the architecture was also made of very high walls. The nave and galleries are not vaulted and the structure was for a time exposed or panelled. Then was built the facade, composed in front of towers built of large blocks of Roussard sandstone. Their walls were 14 metres high and can still be demarcated. To the north of the nave and outside the building, we still find the 11th century Romanesque windows. They are now walled and clearly indicate the alteration that took place in the 13th century. In 1110, the body of Helie de la Flèche, former Earl of Maine, was brought into the abbey church. A representative in war clothing is raised with his shroud, helmet, sword and shield. At the time, the abbey also had a copyists' workshop where the religious illuminated the manuscripts. Manuscripts of very high quality dating from the second half of the 11th and early 12th centuries have been found. They were kept in the monastic library. Today, four manuscripts are recognized as the most precious documents, they were kept in the archives and library on rue Gambetta, before being transferred to the Louis-Aragon media library.

== The end of the old monastic buildings ==
The old buildings were preserved until the middle of the 18th century when they were demolished. These old buildings were built in the 14th century. One was built on the south side of the south tower of the abbey church, the other in parallel from the transept. These buildings bordered the sides of the cloister. Finally, a third building was placed across connecting the two previous buildings. This third frame crossed the second to form a cross by joining it. The first building was a hotel. It had the disadvantage of not offering any view of the interior of the monastery. The windows that made it up were only open to the west, towards the courtyard of the stables. The third building was located to the south and was used for kitchens, outbuildings and the refectory. Upstairs was the famous library and dormitory. There were other dormitories in the second building. In this second building, there is a long corridor used by the monks to go down into the abbey church. A house was specially reserved for the abbot in charge. It was located on the edge of rue de la Couture. A famous 1682 engraving from the Monasticon Gallicanum shows what La Couture was like at the time. However, the layout of the drawing was too idealistic to be specific to the reality of the time. However, the drawing is accurate as to the layout of the main and even secondary buildings. In 1695, François Roger de Gaignières came to Le Mans in search of old tombs and cellars. He stops at the Couture and draws the facade of the abbey church with precision and with equal accuracy the figurations of the abbots engraved on the funeral slabs or sculpted on the mausoleums.

The refectory is equipped with superb paintings by a painter from Avignon named Pierre Parrocel. The latter specialized in religious paintings. He executed five paintings in 1718. All of them are curved in shape, all of them have evangelical subjects related to food. In the middle of the 18th century, the abbey house was changed. The old dwelling dating from the 16th century is still a medieval building that has suffered considerable damage due to its age. We buy a two-hectare estate next door. An amphitheatre garden is cultivated with hornbeams, lime trees and white mulberry trees. Silkworm is grown there. The little bachelor apartment was still composed of two buildings and two pavilions. There was a floor with bedrooms and a roof.

== The new monastery ==
In the middle of the 18th century, the monks began building a large monastery. The plans were drawn up in 1750. However, the project was a little too idealistic but very rigorous. The project provided for the existence of a large block 99 metres wide by 68 metres long, framing two courtyards: one for the cloister and the other for the kitchen. The two must be separated by a small construction. All around the courtyards there had to be corridors in order to make the installation as functional as possible. The building facing the sunset from the south tower of the abbey church is the most functional with the atrium, the portery, the large entrance hall, the procurerie, the depository, etc. This wing will be by far the most frequented because it is the only one authorized for external visitors. The noon wing is used for snacks and the east wing for religious services. The latter also has a small prison cell to lock up undesirables or penitents. The part between the two courtyards offers amenities and ablutions. On the first floor, there were no less than 32 dormitory rooms, a common room for novices, five rooms reserved for the infirmary and six guest rooms.

To carry out their project, the monks called upon a renowned architect: Jean-François Pradel, the same one who would participate in the construction of the Château de Sourches under the direction of Gabriel de Lestrade. He is a project designer, plan designer and project manager. Limousin stonemasons will come to help with the work at Pradel's express request. The latter have already gained a certain reputation since the construction of the Palace of Versailles. The former guest house will not be immediately destroyed but will still be used to shelter the monks during the work, above all for reasons of economy. The ground floors are built like long vaulted naves with basket handles. They are then partitioned in order to offer rooms of various sizes. The two courtyards, the cloister courtyard and the kitchen courtyard, are surrounded by three galleries. The large staircase will be refocused compared to the previous one. The refectory will have only two windows and the monastery rooms will be reduced to twenty-five. The architect will extend the internal galleries to offer several exits to the garden. The wing facing south will be the most pleasant. It has twenty-one windows in an alignment which, in order to avoid it being too long, will see three slight indentations with pavilions. The central pavilion will open on a porch, its pediment will be surmounted by a small bell tower giving rhythm to the monks' lives.

=== Interior architecture ===
During the reconstruction of the abbey, the monks pay particular attention to different areas that they wish to see very well cared for. For example, the cloister has three galleries, each with a horseshoe in its layout. The galleries are particularly well cared for because they are the most important point of passage for monks. The side along the nave still has 12th century sculptures, which are still visible today. The galleries will have 21 bays open to the courtyard through window arches. Each bay is separated from the next by Tuscan capital pilasters. The ceilings are rounded. In the centre of each, there is a small carved rockwork motif. On one of them we can notice the very symbolic keys of Saint Peter and the sword of Saint Paul.

The large staircase, still intact today, will be one of the jewels of interior architecture. Its degrees rotate three times and connect four levels. The relatively wide flights are suspended on half hoops lightened with glasses. The whole is a masterpiece of stereotomy. In all, there are more than 120 steps divided into twelve straight flights to get from the basement to the attics. An iron railing sits around the stairwell and wraps around the railing while following its movements. The only window present, more than 15 metres high, allows light to be diffused throughout the staircase without subaltern lighting.

The chapter room is small in size. It looks like a feminine boudoir of the time with its carved woodwork of various small motifs. An interesting anecdote, above the front door is a carved woodwork with the initials LL, dedicated to Louis XV. This detail will miraculously pass over the revolutionary destruction. The walls will be decorated with eleven paintings and the room will contain twenty-seven seats. The repertoire will offer a very simple architecture. It will include five paintings by Pierre Parrocel, dating from 1718. Embedded in the walls, they will face the windows. In the sacristy, the sculptures of the panels date from 1772. The woodwork covers only 4/5 of the walls, the rest being reserved for the fallout from the ceiling. The latter present silvery motifs often linked to Bible stories.

== Bibliography ==
- Alain de Dieuleveult, La Couture : une abbaye mancelle au Moyen Âge (990-1518), Le Mans, Jean Vilaire, 1963
- Henry Branchomme, L'Abbaye Saint-Pierre de la Couture, préfecture de la Sarthe, août 2009
- Guy-Marie Oury, « La Vie monastique à l'abbaye de la Couture (XVe-XVIII siecles) », La Province du Maine, vol 133, 4th series, April–June / July–September 1981
- Jacques Gohier, « La Couture, une abbaye bénédictine par Étienne Bouton », La Vie mancelle et sarthoise, no. 390, January–February 2007
