= Georges d'Aubusson de La Feuillade =

French Catholic clergyman

His Grace Georges d'Aubusson de la Feuillade, Bishop of Metz
- Bishop of Metz 1669 to 1697
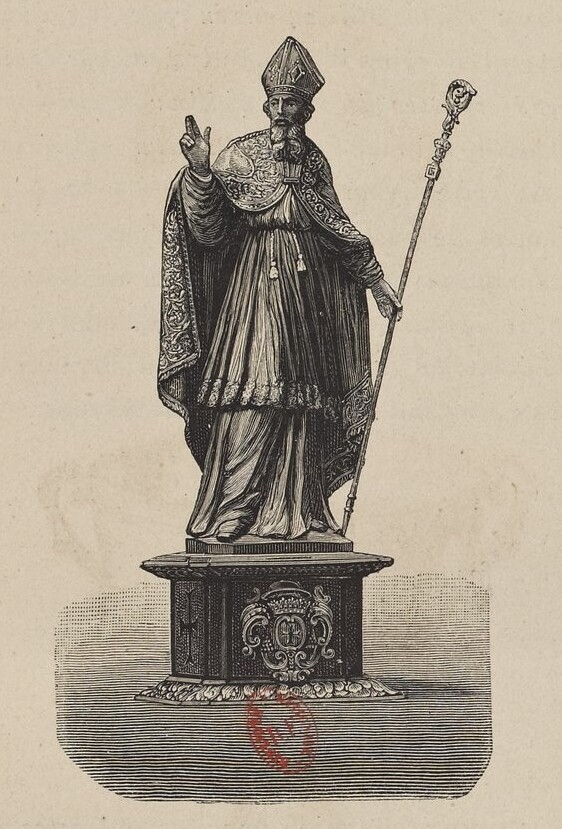
- portrait statuette of Georges d'Aubusson de la Feuillade by César Bagard
- Church: Roman Catholic
- Diocese: Diocese of Metz
- Elected: 1669
- Predecessor: Wilhelm Egon von Fürstenberg
- Successor: Henri Charles du Cambout de Coislin
- Other posts: Church Offices; Archbishop of Embrun 1649-1668; President, Assembly of the French clergy 1651; Abbott, Saint-Barthélemy de Joyenval 1668-1697; Saint Loup de Troyes; Ambassador of France; Republic of Venice 1659 to 1661; Spain, 1661 to 1667; Other; Order of the Holy Spirit 1661

Orders
- Consecration: 12 September 1649

Personal details
- Born: 1609 Aubusson, Creuse
- Died: 12 May 1697 Metz
- Buried: Metz Cathedral
- Denomination: Roman Catholic
- Parents: François, Comte d'Aubusson; Isabeau Brachet de Pérusse
- Profession: Roman Catholic bishop
- Education: Sorbonne, Paris, 1639

Georges d'Aubusson de La Feuillade (1609 to 1697) was a French Catholic clergyman under Louis XIV, who served as Archbishop of Embrun (1649–1668), then Bishop of Metz (1669–1697). He also held a number of diplomatic posts and actively supported measures against French Huguenots; he died in May 1697 and was buried in Metz Cathedral.

== Early life ==
Georges d'Aubusson de la Feuillade was born in 1609 near Aubusson, Creuse, second of five sons of François, Comte d'Aubusson (ca 1590 to 1632) and Isabeau Brachet de Pérusse. Both his father and elder brother Leon (? to 1648) were senior aides to Gaston, Duke of Orléans (1608–1660), heir to the French throne until the birth of Louis XIV in 1638. He had three younger brothers, Gabriel-Bratchet (? to 1638), Paul (1622–1646) and François d'Aubusson de La Feuillade (1631 - 1691). Of his five sisters, Elizabeth (1624–1704) became Abbess of the convent of Sainte-Marie de la Règle in 1679 but little is known of the others, who all appear to have become nuns.

== Career ==
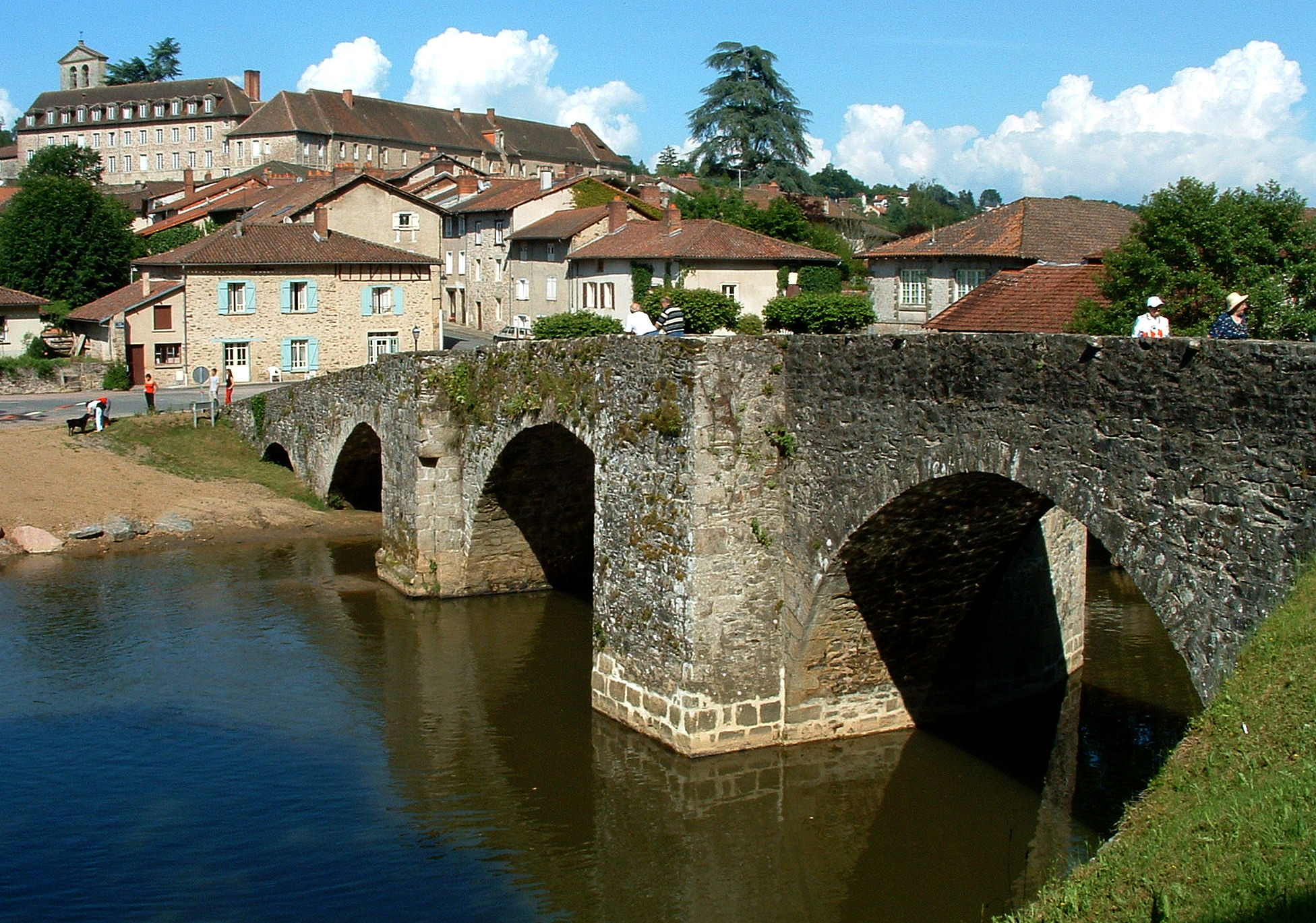
Solignac, with Abbey in the background; Georges joined the Order here in 1639

The first half of the 17th century in France was a period of intense civil strife; the 1590 Edict of Nantes ended the French Wars of Religion but continued state persecution caused a series of Huguenot rebellions in the 1620s. This was followed by the 1635-1659 Franco-Spanish War, accompanied by an internal power struggle during the minority of Louis XIV that led to the 1648-1653 civil wars or Fronde. Their impact is reflected in the history of Georges's immediate family; his father was killed in 1632 at Castelnaudary, while three of his four brothers also died in battle, Leon at Lens in 1648, Gabriel-Brachet at Saint-Omer in 1638 and Paul at Mardyck in 1646.

La Feuillade graduated from the Sorbonne university in April 1639 and joined Solignac Abbey; in 1645, he was nominated as one of the delegates from the Diocese of Limoges to the Assembly of the French clergy in Paris. Control of the Assembly was an important political post, since the conflict between Protestant and Catholic was mirrored by internal divisions among French Catholics. Some were theological, like the dispute over Jansenism, others political, such as resisting demands by the regional Parlements that the Church pay taxes or the re-admission of Assembly members expelled by Cardinal Richelieu in 1641.

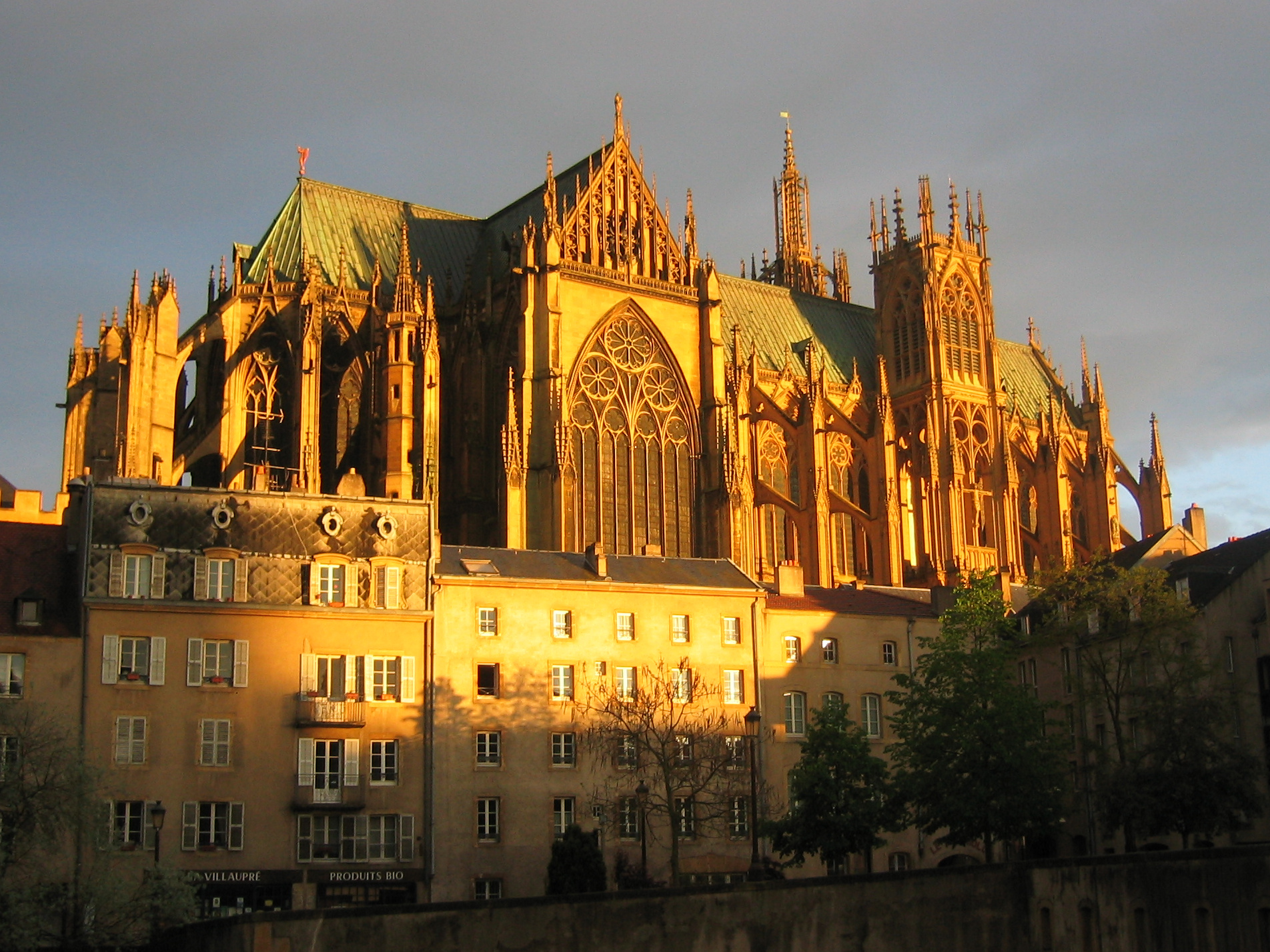
Metz Cathedral; Georges was Bishop of Metz 1669-1697

As a sign of his growing stature, in September 1649 he was made Archbishop of Embrun, a Roman Catholic Archdiocese in an area historically dominated by Huguenots. During the Fronde des nobles (1650–1653), the La Feuillade brothers supported the Court party led by Louis XIV's mother, Anne of Austria and Cardinal Mazarin. Georges was appointed President of the Assembly of Clergy in March 1651 and published an attack on Charles de Fiesque, a senior aide to Condé, one of the Fronde's leaders. He reaped the benefit of his support for the Crown after October 1652 when the Fronde ended in a crushing defeat for its leaders.

He served as Ambassador to the Republic of Venice (1659–1661), followed by Spain (1661–1669), after which he was appointed Bishop of Metz, a position he retained until his death in 1697. This was an important and sensitive position; Metz had been occupied by French troops since 1552 but officially remained part of the Holy Roman Empire until ceded to France in the 1648 Peace of Westphalia. He also published a number of tracts backing the policies of Louis XIV, including measures against French Protestants that culminated in the 1685 Edict of Fontainebleau and the French claim to the Spanish throne.

Allegedly senile in the last years of his life, a financial audit of the diocese after his death in 1697 showed that a large sum of money was missing. The report concluded this had been stolen by his nephew Louis d'Aubusson de La Feuillade; Louis XIV wanted to dismiss him from the army but a family connection, Louis de Pontchartrain, persuaded him not to do so.

In his Mémoires written in the 1720s, Saint-Simon (1675–1755) describes the bishop as overly familiar and avaricious, although the accuracy of these comments is hard to assess. He was equally scathing in his assessment of François de La Feuillade, who died in 1691 when Saint Simon was 16 and in general, uniformly hostile to Louis XIV and his supporters, the majority of whom he dismissed as commoners.

Heraldic arms of de la Feuillade

== Sources ==
- Anselme, Augustin Dechauffé & Du Forny; Histoire de la Maison Royale de France, et des grands officiers de la Couronne, Volume V; (Compagnie des Libraires, 1750);
- Bergin, Joseph; The Politics of Religion in Early Modern France (Yale University Press, 2014);
- Chapman, Sara (2004). Private Ambition and Political Alliances in Louis XIV's Government; (University of Rochester Press, 2004);
- De la Feuliade, Georges d'Aubusson; Response de Mgr l'archevesque et prince d'Ambrun [George d'Aubusson de La Feuillade], président de l'assemblée du clergé, faite à M. le comte de Fiesque, et autres gentils-hommes, envoyez à ladite assemblée, de la part de Messieurs de la noblesse, le mercredy 15 mars 1651; (G le Rond, 1651);
- Tucker, Spencer C; A Global Chronology of Conflict: From the Ancient World to the Modern Middle East: A Global Chronology of Conflict in 6 volumes; (ABC-CLIO, 2009);

Catholic Church titles
Preceded by Wilhelm Egon von Fürstenberg	Bishop of Metz; 1669–1697	Succeeded by Henri Charles du Cambout de Coislin
Preceded by Guillaume d'Hugues	Archbishop of Embrun; 1649–1669	Succeeded by Charles Brûlart de Genlis
