= Pierre Guérin de Tencin =

French cardinal

His Eminence Pierre Guérin de Tencin
- Cardinal, Archbishop of Lyon; Primate of the Gauls
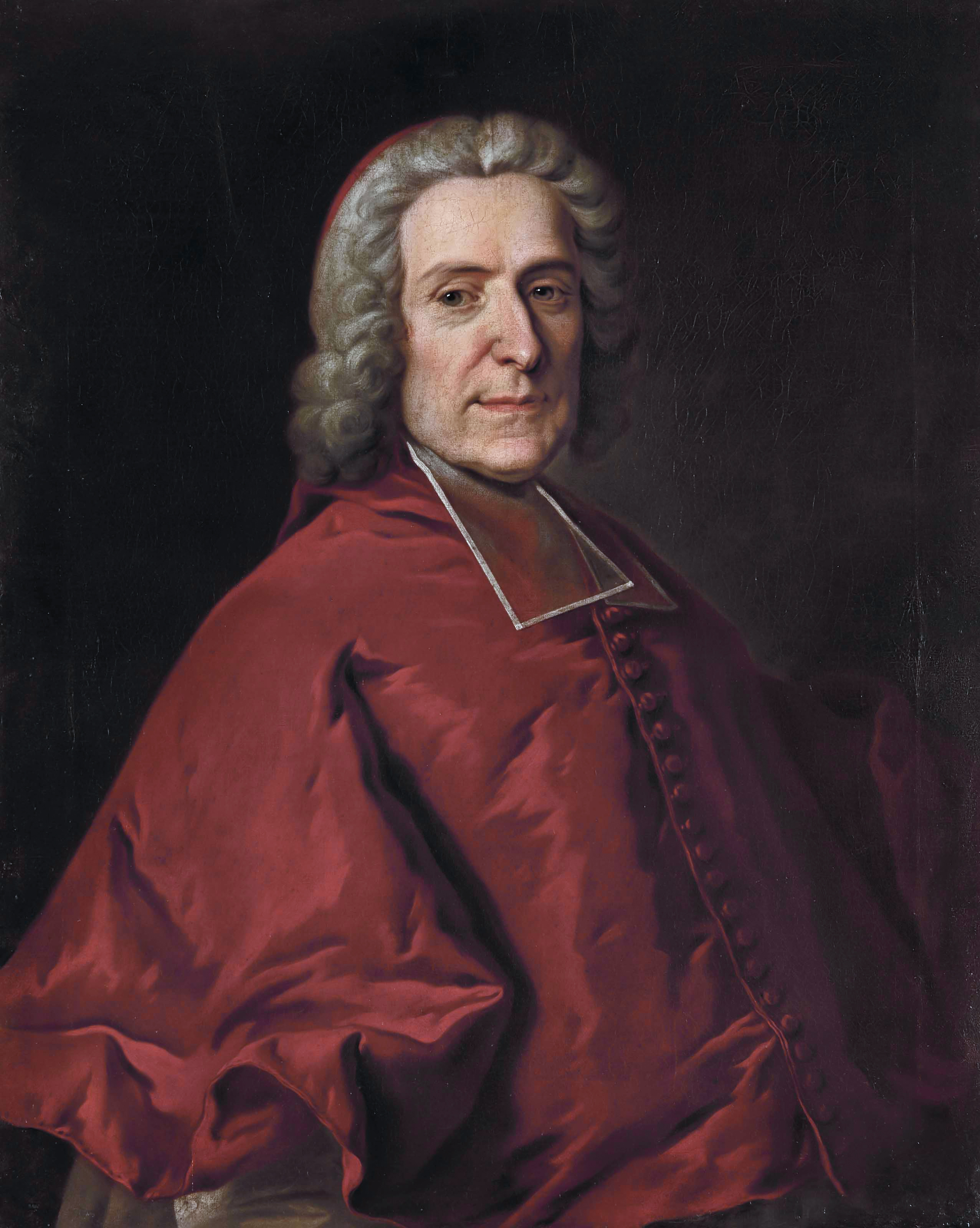
- Cardinal Pierre Paul Guérin de Tencin by Hyacinthe Rigaud
- Church: Roman Catholic Church
- Archdiocese: Lyon
- Appointed: 17 September 1740
- Term ended: 2 March 1758
- Predecessor: Charles-François de Chateauneuf de Rochebonne
- Successor: Antoine de Montazet
- Other post: Cardinal Priest of Santi Nereo e Achilleo
- Previous posts: Archbishop of Embrun (1724–40)

Orders
- Consecration: 2 July 1724 by Pope Benedict XIII
- Created cardinal: 23 February 1739 by Pope Clement XII
- Rank: Cardinal-Priest

Personal details
- Born: 22 August 1680 Grenoble, Kingdom of France
- Died: 2 March 1758 (aged 77) Lyon, Kingdom of France
- Buried: Lyon Cathedral

Pierre-Paul Guérin de Tencin (22 August 1679 – 2 March 1758) was a French ecclesiastic and statesman, who was archbishop of Embrun and Lyon and cardinal. His sister was Claudine Guérin de Tencin.

== Biography ==
He was the son of Antoine Guérin, sieur of Tencin, and his wife Louise de Buffévent.

After studying with the Oratorians in his native Grenoble, he entered the Sorbonne, where he became prior in 1702, and obtained a doctorate in theology in 1705. He was then appointed Vicar-General of the diocese of Sens and, in 1721, accompanied Cardinal de Rohan to Rome as his conclavist, to support the candidacy of Cardinal Conti (Innocent XIII), from whom he had obtained a promise to bestow the purple on the French minister Guillaume Dubois. He remained at Rome as French chargé d'affaires, with the appointment in commendam of abbot of Trois-Fontaines to support him (1739–53), until Benedict XIII, with whom he was on cordial terms of intimacy and very influential, consecrated him Archbishop of Embrun (26 June 1724). During his stay in Rome he befriended Prospero Lambertini, later to become Pope Benedict XIV, with whom for many decades he maintained correspondence in letters.

At the request of James Francis Edward Stuart, Tencin was created cardinal on 23 February 1739, with the titulus of Ss. Nereus and Achilleus. He remained at Rome as French ambassador until 1742, when he took possession of the archiepiscopal see of Lyon, to which he had succeeded on 19 November 1740. Louis XV appointed him minister of state in September 1742, though he held no portfolio, and Commander of the Order of Saint-Esprit.

He was zealous in his opposition to the Jansenists, and, at the provincial synod which he held at Embrun from 16 August to 28 September 1727, he suspended Jean Soanen, Bishop of Senez, a prelate eighty years of age, who had appealed against the Bull Unigenitus.

After the death in 1743 of André-Hercule Cardinal de Fleury, the prime minister to whom he owed much of his political advancement, his influence began to decrease. The death of Claudine Guérin de Tencin, his salonist sister, in 1749 removed some of his political ambition, and in 1752 he retired to his see of Lyons.

== Notes ==
Catholic Church titles
Preceded by Jean-François-Gabriel de Hénin-Liétard	Bishop of Embrun; 1724–1740	Succeeded by Bernardin-François Fouquet
