= Rama (Gaul) =

Rama or Rame was an ancient town in Gallia Narbonensis, which the Itineraries fix on the road between Ebrodunum (modern Embrun) and Brigantium (modern Briançon). D'Anville says that there is a place called Rame on this road near the Durance, on the same side as Embrun and Briançon, and at a point where a torrent named Biesse joins the Durance. The editors of the Barrington Atlas of the Greek and Roman World place Rama near La Roche-de-Rame.
