= Archdiocese of Embrun =

Former Roman Catholic archdiocese in France

Coordinates: 44°33′44″N 6°29′42″E

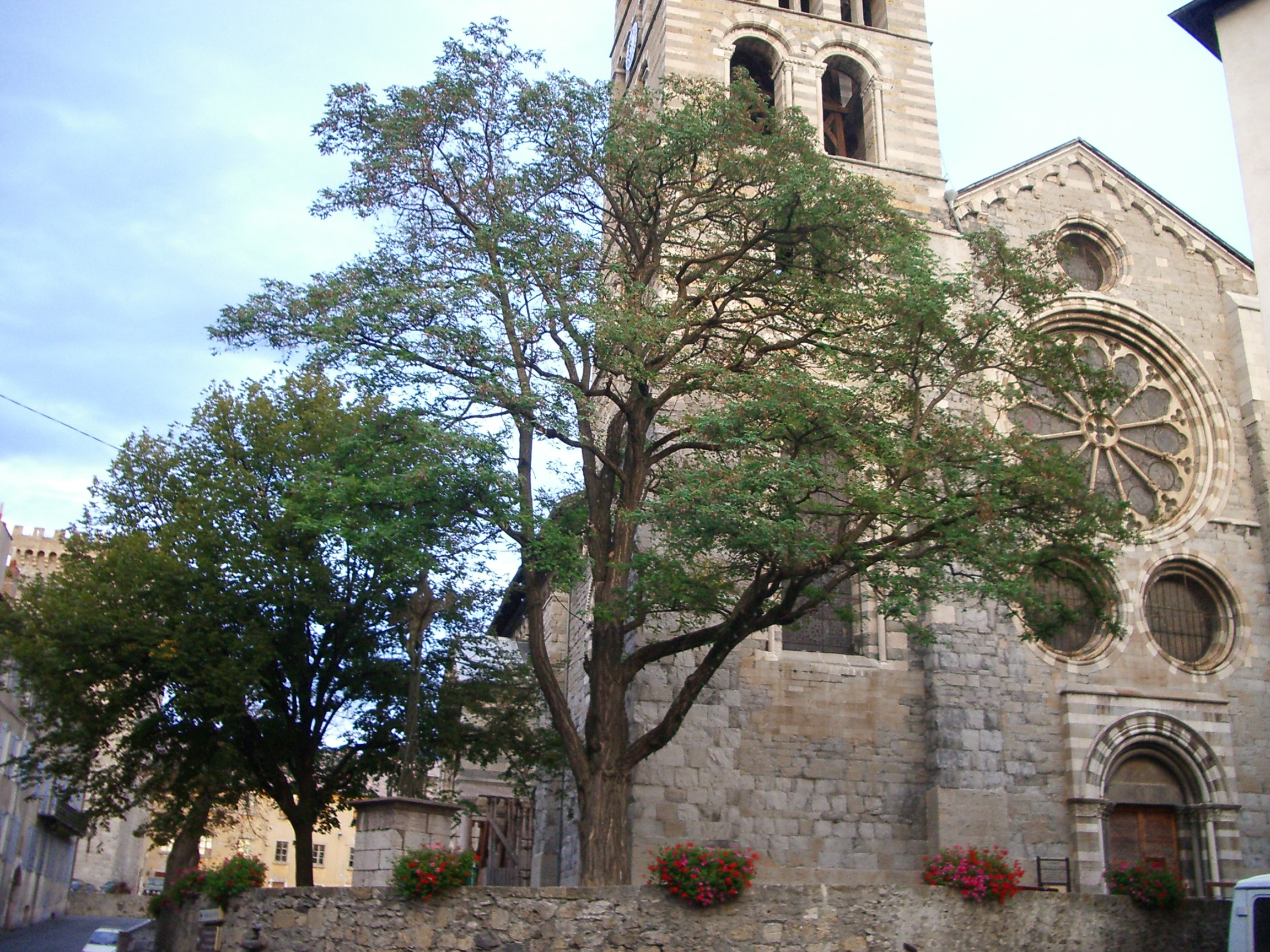
Embrun Cathedral

The Archdiocese of Embrun was a Catholic jurisdiction located in southeastern France, in the mountains of the Maritime Alps, on a route that led from Gap by way of Briançon to Turin. It had as suffragans the Diocese of Digne, Diocese of Antibes and Grasse, Diocese of Vence, Diocese of Glandèves, Diocese of Senez and Diocese of Nice. Its see was the Cathedral of Nôtre Dame in Embrun.

The former Archdiocese of Embrun was suppressed after the French Revolution. It was replaced, under the Civil Constitution of the Clergy (1790) by a diocese which had the same boundaries of the civil departement in which it was located. The diocese was called 'Haute-Alpes', with its center at Gap.

When the Diocese of Gap was re-established in 1822 it comprised, besides the ancient Diocese of Gap, a large part of the ancient Archdiocese of Embrun. The name of the metropolitan see of Embrun, however, had been absorbed in the title of the Archbishop of Aix-en-Provence and Arles, until 2007. In 2008, the title of Embrun was reattached to the Diocese of Gap by papal decree of Pope Benedict XVI.

== History ==
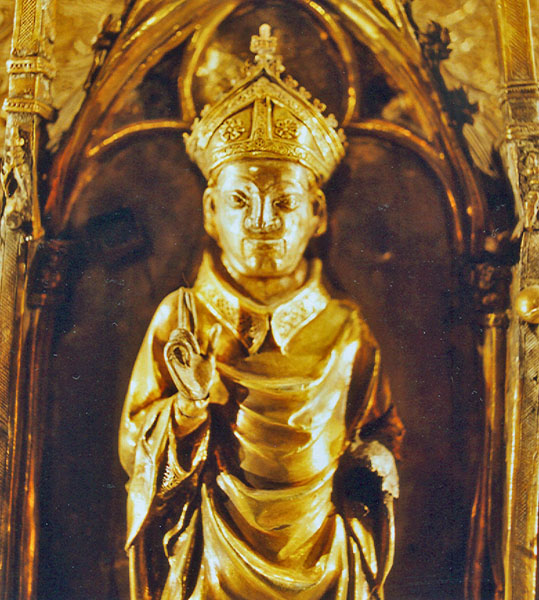
Palladius of Embrun was a bishop of Embrun during the 6th century.

Tradition ascribes the evangelization of Embrun to Saints Nazarius and Celsus, martyrs under emperor Nero. Gregory of Tours states that they were martyred at Embrun. Their bodies, however, were discovered in a cemetery in Milan by Saint Ambrose. They were also drowned at Trier, on orders of the Emperor Nero. Their entire story is without historical foundation, and a mass of contradictions and improbabilities. According to another tradition, the first Bishop of Embrun, Saint Marcellus, was such a successful preacher that, by the end of his episcopacy, there was not a single pagan left in the diocese.

The see became an archbishopric about 800. In 1056 Pope Victor confirmed the Archbishop of Embrun as Metropolitan of the Sees of Digne, Chorges, Solliès, Senez, Glandèves, Cimiez-Nice, Vence, and Antibes (Grasse). Bishop Winimann was also granted the pallium In 1276 the Archbishops of Embrun were made Princes of the Holy Roman Empire.

The see was suppressed in the French Revolution, being transferred to the diocese of Gap, and the cathedral church became a mere parish church.

== Notable Bishops of Embrun ==
- St. Guillaume (1120–34), founder of the Abbey of Boscodon;
- Henry of Segusio (1250–71), known as (H)Ostiensis, i.e. Cardinal Bishop of Ostia, an orator and canonist of renown;
- Bertrand de Déaulx (1323–38), who as the legate of Clement VI at Rome did much to bring about the downfall of Rienzi;
- Giulio de' Medici (1510–11), later pope under the name of Clement VII;
- Cardinal François de Tournon (1517–26), employed on diplomatic missions by King Francis I of France, and founder of the College de Tournon;
- Cardinal de Tencin (1724–40), who in September 1727, caused the condemnation by the Council of Embrun of the *Jansenist Soanen, Bishop of his suffragan see of Senez.
- St. Vincent Ferrer preached several missions against the Vaudois in the Diocese of Embrun.

== Bishops ==
- † by 374: Marcellinus.
- 374: Artemius
- c. 400: Jacob
- 439: Armentarius
- 440-† ca 475: Ingenuus
- 517: Catulinus
- Gallicanus
- Palladius of Embrun
- 541-549: Gallicanus
- 567-579: Salonius
- Emeritus 585- 588
- Lopacharus 614
- c. 630: Albin
- c. 650 to c. 653: Ætherius
- [Chramlinus]
- [c. 740: Vualchinus], founded Novalesa Abbey.
- c. 791–794: Marcellus

== Archbishops ==
=== c. 800–1200 ===
- Bernardus
- 829: Agericus
- c. 853 to c. 859: Aribertus (or Arbertus)
- 876: Bermond
- 878: Aribert II.
- 886: Ermoldus (or Ermaldus or Ermold) 886 or 887
- 890-899: Arnaud (or Arnaudus)
- 900–916: Benedict
- 920: Liberalis of Embrun (920–40)
- 943–960: Boson
- c. 970: Amadeus
- 992: Pontius
- 1007–1010: Ismidias
- c. 1016 to c. 1027: Radon
- c. 1033–1044: Ismidon
- c. 1048: Vivemnus (Winnamanus)
- 1050–1054: Guinervinarius
- 1054–1055: Hugues
- 1055–1065: Winnimanus (Guinamand)
- 1066–1077: Guillaume
- 1077: Peter
- c. 1080–1084: Lantelmus
- 1105–1118: Benedict II.
- 1120–1134: Guillaume II.
- 1135 to 7 December 1169: Guillaume III.
- 9 January 1170 to 1176: Raimond I.
- c. 1177–1189: Pierre II. Romain
- 1189–1208: Guillaume IV. de Benevento

=== c. 1200–1500 ===
- 1208 to c. 1212: Raimond II. Sédu
- 1212 to c. 1235: Bernard Chabert
- 1236 to 23. May 1245: Aimar
- 1246–1250: Humbert
- 1250 to May 1262: Henri de Suse (Henricus de Bartholomeis)
- 1263–1286: Jacques Sérène
- 4 August 1286 to 1289: Guillaume V.
- 8 October 1289 to 28 June 1294: Raimond de Médullion
- 28 March 1295 to 26 May 1311: Guillaume de Mandagot (promoted to the See of Aix)
- 22 May 1311 to 1317: Jean du Puy, O.P.
- 1319 to c. 1323: Raimond IV. Robaud
- 5 September 1323 to 1338: Bertrand de Déaulx
- 27. January 1338 to 17. December 1350: Pasteur de Sarrats, O.Min.
- 16. February 1351 to 1361: Guillaume VII. de Bordes
- 1361–1364: Raimond V. de Salges
- 8 January 1364 to 5. September 1365: Bertrand II. de Castelnau
- 1365–1366: Bernard II.
- 1366 to 18 December 1378: Pierre Amelii (d'Ameil)
- 20 May 1379 to 1 May 1427: Michel Etienne Delisle (de Insula), appointed by Pope Clement VII of the Avignon Obedience
- 30 July 1427 to 7 September 1432: Jacques Gélu
- 1432 to 17 January 1457: Jean II. Girard
- 1457 to c. 1470: Jean III de Montmagny
- c. 1470–1494: Jean IV. Baile
- 1494–1510: Rostaing d'Ancezune

=== from 1500 ===
- 1510–1511: Giulio di Giuliano de' Medici
- 1511–1516: Niccolò Fieschi (Fiesque), Cardinal
- 1517–1525: François de Tournon
- 1526–1551: Antoine de Lévis de Château-Morand
- 1551–1555: Balthasar de Jarente
- 1555: Louis de Laval de Bois-Dauphin
- 1556–1560: Robert Cardinal de Lenoncourt
- 1561–1600: Guillaume d'Avançon de Saint-Marcel, Cardinal
- 1601–1612: Honoré du Laurens
- 1612–1648: Guillaume d'Hugues
- 1649–1669: Georges d'Aubusson de La Feuillade (transferred to Metz)
- 1669–1714: Charles Brûlart de Genlis
- 1715–1719: François-Elie de Voyer de Paulmy d'Argenson
- 1719–1724: Jean-François-Gabriel de Hénin-Liétard
- 1724–1740: Pierre Guérin de Tencin (appointed Archbishop of Lyon on 11 November 1740)
- 1741–1767: Bernardin-François Fouquet
- 1767–1790: Pierre-Louis de Leyssin
  - 1791–1793: Ignace Cazeneuve (Constitutional Bishop of Hautes-Alpes)

== See also ==
- Catholic Church in France
- List of Catholic dioceses in France
- Croix de Provence on the Montagne Sainte-Victoire

== Bibliography ==
=== Reference works ===
- Gams, Pius Bonifatius (1873). Series episcoporum Ecclesiae catholicae: quotquot innotuerunt a beato Petro apostolo. Ratisbon: Typis et Sumptibus Georgii Josephi Manz. pp. 548–549. (Use with caution; obsolete)
- Mas Latrie, Louis de (1889). Tresor de chronologie, d'histoire et de geographie pour l'etude et emploi des documents du moyen-age (in French). Paris: Palme. pp. 1420–1421, 2162. (Use with caution; obsolete)
- Jean, Armand (1891). Les évêques et les archevêques de France depuis 1682 jusqu'à 1801 (in French). Paris: A. Picard.
- Eubel, Conradus, ed. (1913). Hierarchia catholica, Tomus 1 (second ed.). Münster: Libreria Regensbergiana. (in Latin) pp. 233–234.
- Eubel, Conradus, ed. (1914). Hierarchia catholica, Tomus 2 (second ed.). Münster: Libreria Regensbergiana. (in Latin) p. 148.
- Gulik, Guilelmus (1923). Eubel, Conradus (ed.). Hierarchia catholica, Tomus 3 (second ed.). Münster: Libreria Regensbergiana. p. 190.
- Gauchat, Patritius (Patrice) (1935). Hierarchia catholica IV (1592-1667). Münster: Libraria Regensbergiana. pp. 179.
- Ritzler, Remigius; Sefrin, Pirminus (1952). Hierarchia catholica medii et recentis aevi V (1667-1730). Patavii: Messagero di S. Antonio. pp. 190–191.
- Ritzler, Remigius; Sefrin, Pirminus (1958). Hierarchia catholica medii et recentis aevi VI (1730-1799). Patavii: Messagero di S. Antonio. p. 203.

=== Studies ===
- Albanés, Joseph Hyacinthe; Ulysse Chevalier (1899). Gallia christiana novissima: Aix, Apt, Fréjus, Gap, Riez et Sisteron (in Latin). Montbéliard: Société anonyme d'imprimerie montbéliardaise.
- Brunel, Louis (1890). Les Vaudois des Alpes françaises et de Freissinières en particulier: leur passé, leur présent, leur avenir (in French) (second ed.). Paris: Fischbacher.
- Duchesne, Louis (1907). Fastes épiscopaux de l'ancienne Gaule: I. Provinces du Sud-Est. Paris: Fontemoing. pp. 285–286. second edition (in French)
- Fisquet, Honore (1867). La France pontificale (Gallia christiana): Metropole d'Aix: Aix, Arles, Embrun (in French). Vol. 2nd partie. Paris: E. Repos. pp. 793–1041.
- Gaillaud, Marie-Eucher (1862). Histoire de Notre-Dame d'Embrun ou la Vierge du Réal (in French). Gap: Impr. Jouglard.
- Sainte-Marthe (Sammarthani), Denis de (1725). Gallia Christiana: In Provincias Ecclesiasticas Distributa, Qua Series Et Historia Archiepiscoporum, Episcoporum Et Abbatum Franciae Vicinarumque Ditionum ab origine Ecclesiarum ab nostra tempora deducitur, & probatur ex authenticis Instrumentis ad calcem appositis. Provinciae Cameracensis, Coloniensis, Ebredunensis (in Latin). Vol. Tomus tertius (III). Paris: Typographia Regia.
- Sirmond, Jacques (1789). Conciliorum Galliae tam editorum quam ineditorum collectio, temporum ordine digesta (in Latin). Vol. Tomus primus. Paris: sumptibus P. Didot.
