= Embrun Cathedral =

- French: Cathédrale Notre-Dame d'Embrun; French: Cathédrale Notre-Dame du Réal
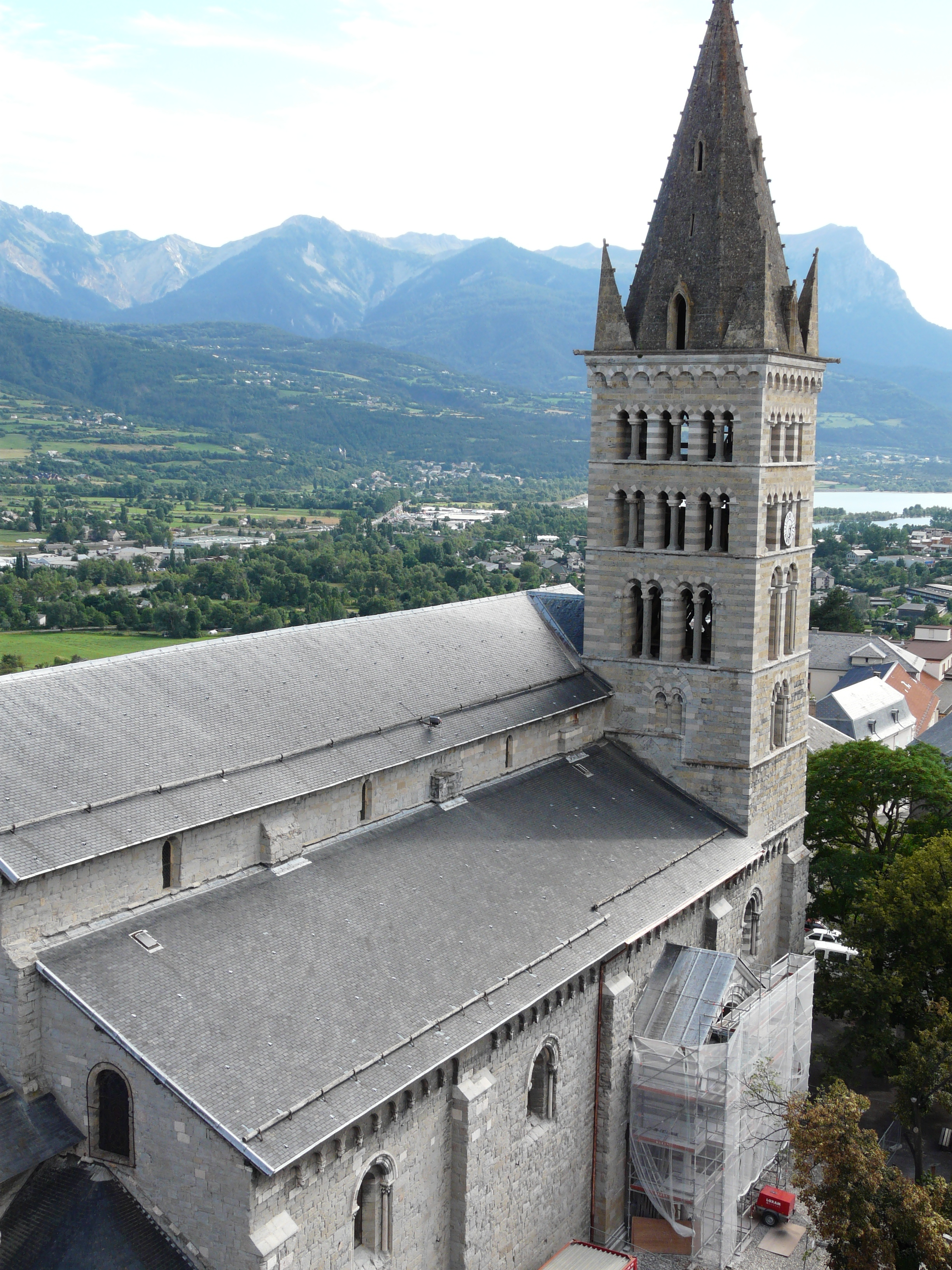
- Embrun Cathedral
- 44°33′44″N 6°29′42″E
- Location: Embrun, Hautes-Alpes, Provence-Alpes-Côte d'Azur
- Address: 9 rue de l'archevêché
- Country: France
- Denomination: Catholic
- Tradition: Roman Rite
- Website: www.serreponcon.com/les-villages-de-serre-poncon/embrun/cathedrale-notre-dame-du-real/

History
- Status: Co-cathedral; Cathedral (until 1790)
- Dedication: Virgin Mary

Architecture
- Functional status: active
- Architectural type: church
- Style: Romanesque and Gothic
- Years built: 1170–1225
- Groundbreaking: 12th century
- Completed: 13th century

Specifications
- Materials: Black schist, white limestone, marble

Administration
- Diocese: Gap and Embrun

Monument historique
- Official name: Église Notre-Dame (ancienne cathédrale)
- Type: classé
- Designated: 1840
- Reference no.: PA00080556

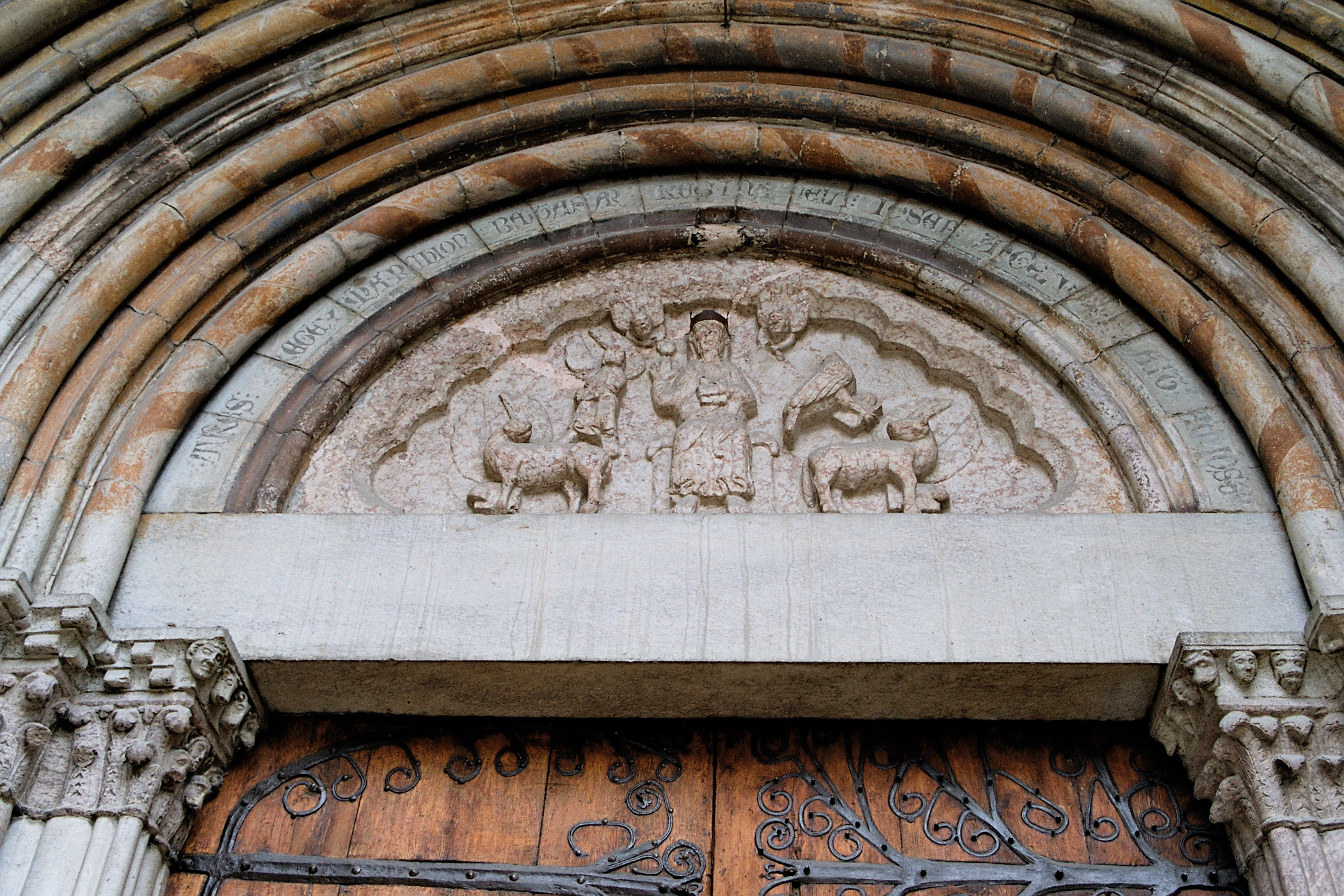
The Tympanum of the northern side portal with the tetramorphed Evangelists and the central Christ in Majesty

Embrun Cathedral (French: Cathédrale Notre-Dame du Réal d'Embrun) is a Roman Catholic church and former cathedral located in the town of Embrun, Hautes-Alpes, France.

The cathedral is a national monument and was the seat of the former Archbishopric of Embrun, which was divided between the Bishopric of Gap and the Archbishopric of Aix in 1822.

On its door were posted in 1489 the thirty-two propositions imputed to the Waldenses, that presaged the campaign to extirpate them as heretics, which resurfaced in the Dauphiné with intense savagery during the Wars of Religion in France: Lesdiguières pillaged Embrun Cathedral in 1585. This saw the destruction of a fresco on one of the porches, probably painted in the 13th century, representing the Three Wise Men visiting Mary and Jesus, which had been the object of a celebrated pilgrimage for many centuries and had given the cathedral its name ("réal" in this instance means "royal").

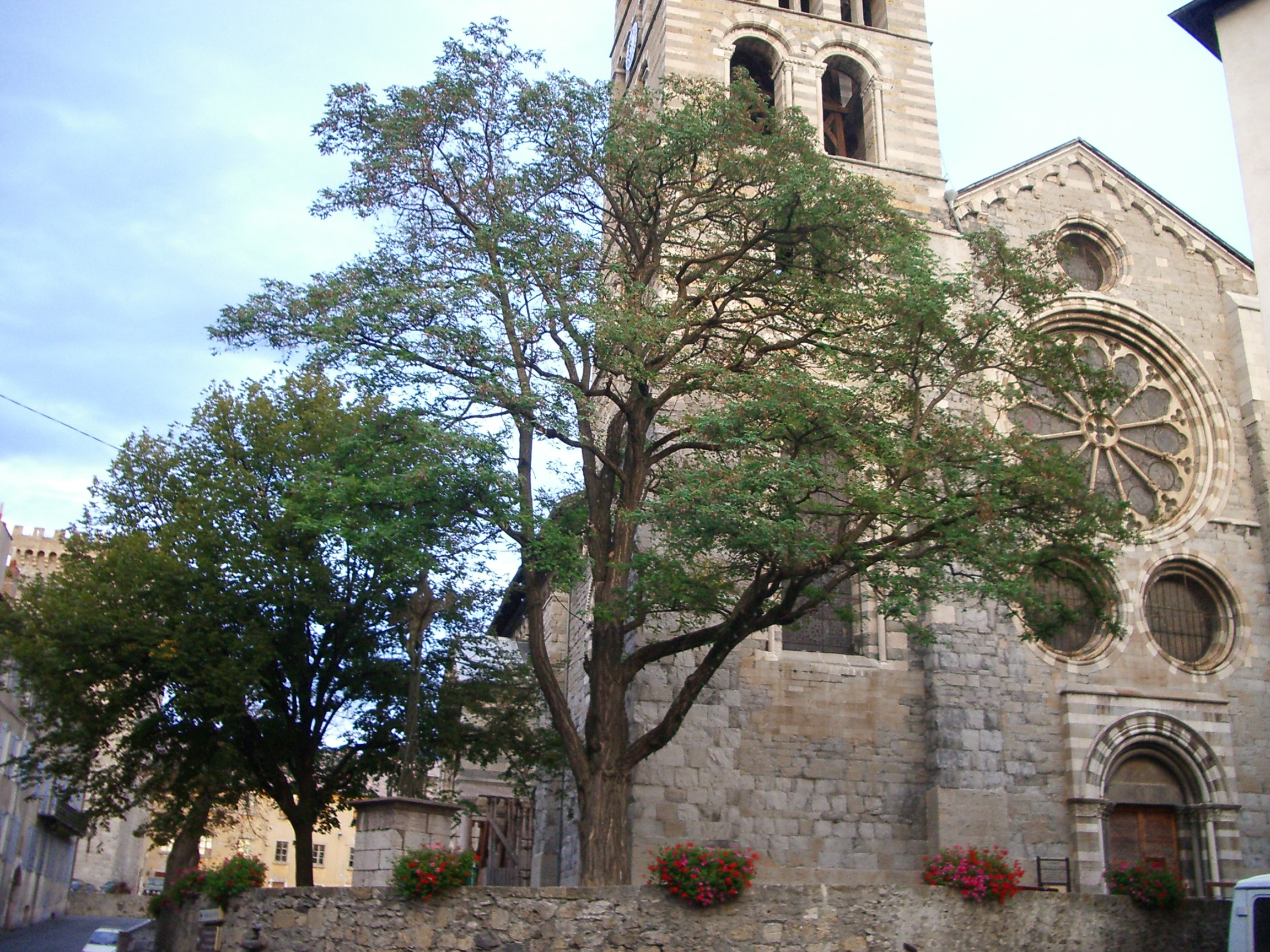
The façade or west front

In the fifth century relics of St Nazarius were translated to Embrun, which had supported a bishop since the fourth century; Embrun became a noted place of pilgrimage. Charlemagne erected the basilica that was visited by Pope Leo III.

The current cathedral church, built on foundations that date to its founding in the ninth century, was constructed between 1170 and 1225; its Romanesque portal, columns supported on crouching lions in the north portal and striped stonework express cultural links with Lombardy. The striping was created by alternating courses of black schist and white limestone, while the crouching lions and their columns were executed in pink and green marbles.

The interior has an elaborate Baroque high altar inlaid with colored marbles, recently rediscovered frescoes, and an organ (the oldest working in France) which was donated by Louis XI of France, who habitually sported in his cap a leaden emblem of the Virgin of Embrun and whose last words were "Nôtre Dame d'Embrun, ma bonne maîtress, ayez pitié de moi."
