= Embrun, Hautes-Alpes =

Embrun
- Commune
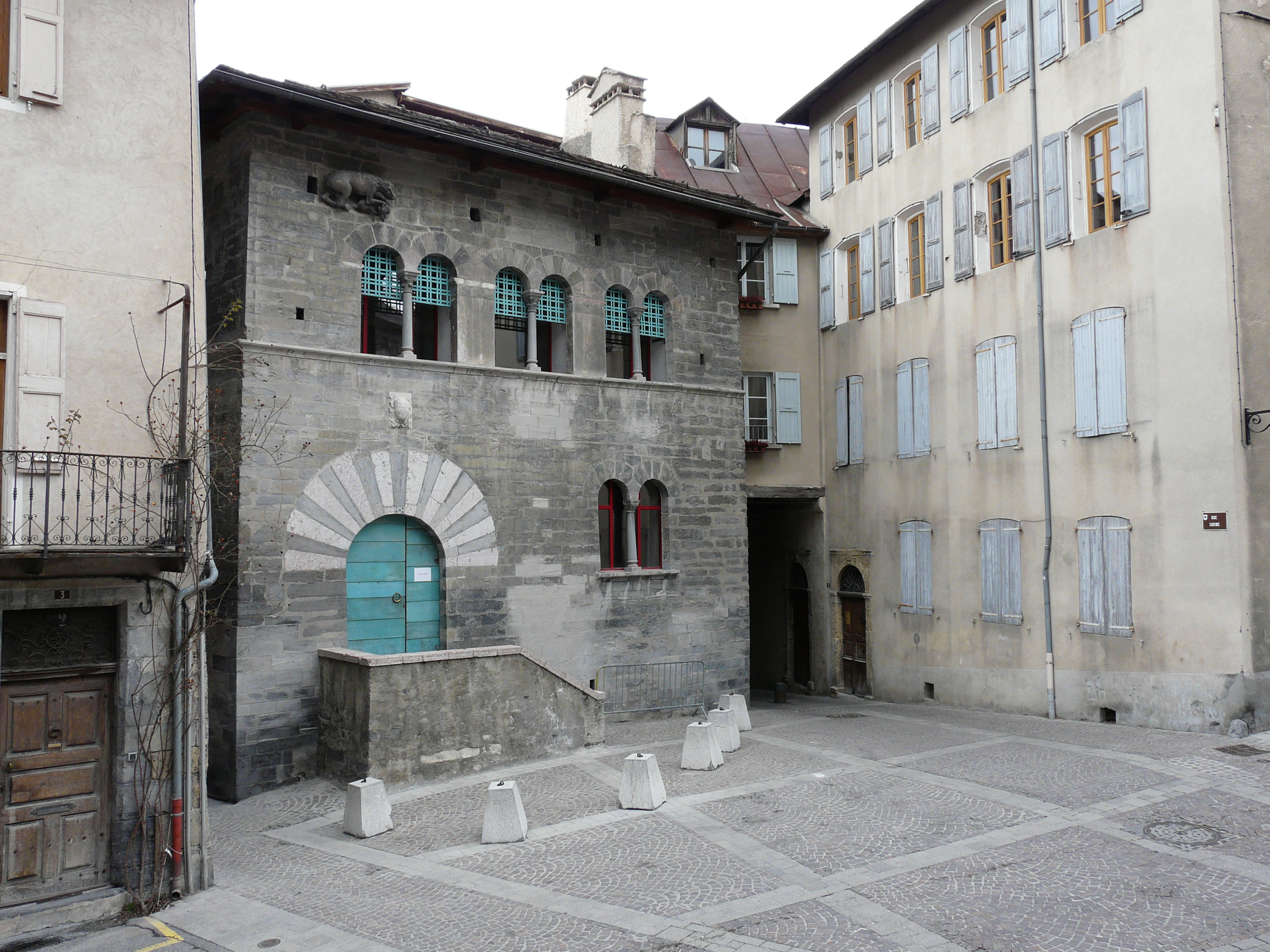
- House of the Chanonges (13th century).

- Coat of arms
- Location of Embrun
- Location within France Location within Provence-Alpes-Côte d'Azur
- Coordinates: 44°33′57″N 6°29′46″E
- Country: France
- Region: Provence-Alpes-Côte d'Azur
- Department: Hautes-Alpes
- Arrondissement: Gap
- Canton: Embrun
- Intercommunality: Serre-Ponçon

Government
  - Mayor (2026–32): Chantal Eyméoud (UDI)
- Area^{1}: 36.390 km^{2} (14.050 sq mi)
- Elevation: 871 m (2,858 ft)
- Highest elevation: 2,800 m (9,200 ft)
- Lowest elevation: 778 m (2,552 ft)
- Population (2023): 6,412
  - Density: 176.2/km^{2} (456.4/sq mi)
- Time zone: UTC+01:00 (CET)
  - Summer (DST): UTC+02:00 (CEST)
- INSEE/Postal code: 05046 /05200
- ^{1} French Land Register data, which excludes lakes, ponds, glaciers > 1 km^{2} (0.386 sq mi or 247 acres) and river estuaries.

Embrun (French pronunciation: [ɑ̃bʁœ̃]; Occitan: Ambrun pronounced [amˈbryn], Latin: Ebrodunum, Ebrudunum, and Eburodunum) is a commune in the Hautes-Alpes department in the Provence-Alpes-Côte d'Azur region in southeastern France.

== Description ==
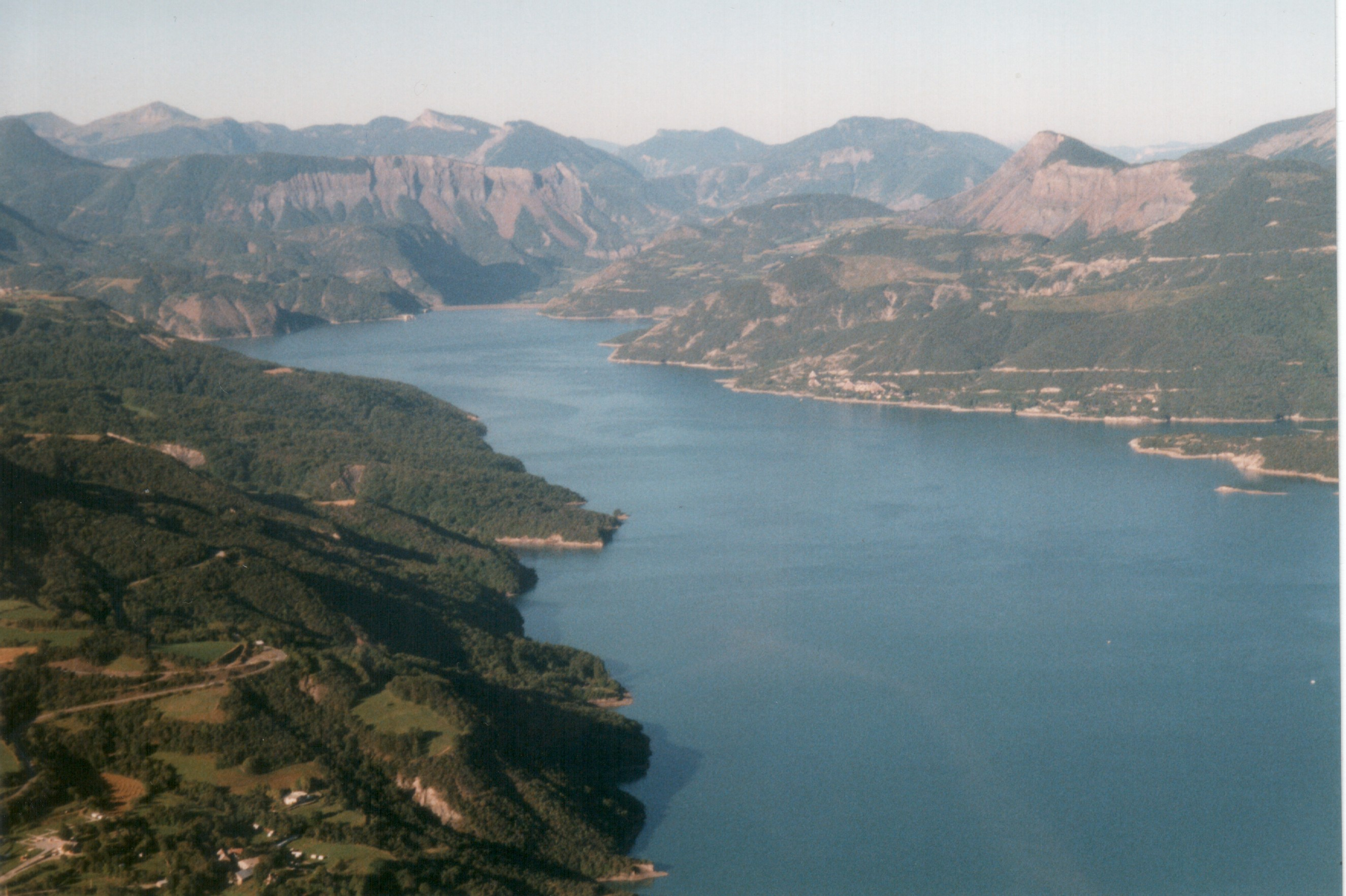
Lac de Serre-Ponçon, reservoir in the department of Alpes-de-Haute-Provence, in southeast France

It is located between Gap and Briançon and at the eastern end of one of the largest artificial lakes in Western Europe: the Lac de Serre-Ponçon.

The Canadian town of Embrun, Ontario was named after Embrun in 1856.

== History ==
Embrun was formerly known as Ebrodunum (Ἐβρόδουνον in Greek language sources). There is some variation in the writing of the first part of the name. It is Epebrodunum in Strabo's text, but later translators corrected it. Strabo (iv.) says that from Tarasco to the borders of the Vocontii and the beginning of the ascent of the Alps, through the Druentia and Caballio, is 63 miles; and from thence to the other boundaries of the Vocontii, to the kingdom of Cottius (the Alpes Cottiae), to the village of Ebrodunum, 99 miles. Ebrodunum was in the civitas (tribal state) of the Caturiges, and just on the borders of the Vocontii, as it appears.

The position of Ebrodunum is easily determined by the itineraries and the name. Ptolemy (iii. 1) mentions Eborodunum as the city of the Caturiges, and no other. In the Jerusalem Itinerary Ebrodunum is called Mansio, like Caturiges (modern Chorges), which was also in the territory of the Caturiges. There are Roman remains at Chorges, and none are mentioned at Embrun, though it appears that the cathedral of Embrun is built on the site of a Roman temple, or that some of the materials of a temple were used for it. Ebrodunum was, for a time, the capital of the Roman province of Alpes Maritimae.

In the feudal age, it was an important archbishopric see. The town was sacked in 1585 by Huguenots and in 1692 by the duke of Savoy during the Nine Years' War.

In stage 17 of the 2013 Tour de France, Embrun was the starting point for an individual time trial. In 2017, stage 19 of the Tour de France started at Embrun.

== Ecclesiastical history ==
Embrun was the see of a bishopric since the fourth century, which became a Metropolitan archbishopric in the fourteenth century and was suppressed in the French Revolution.

== Population ==
Historical population

Year	Pop.	±% p.a.
1793	2,380	—
1800	3,125	+3.97%
1806	3,301	+0.92%
1821	3,002	−0.63%
1831	3,062	+0.20%
1836	3,169	+0.69%
1841	4,373	+6.65%
1846	4,453	+0.36%
1851	4,794	+1.49%
1856	4,736	−0.24%
1861	4,287	−1.97%
1866	4,183	−0.49%
1872	3,751	−1.80%
1876	3,957	+1.35%
1881	4,008	+0.26%
1886	4,481	+2.26%
1891	4,017	−2.16%
1896	3,430	−3.11%
1901	3,505	+0.43%

Year	Pop.	±% p.a.
1906	3,752	+1.37%
1911	3,556	−1.07%
1921	2,407	−3.83%
1926	2,802	+3.09%
1931	2,711	−0.66%
1936	2,962	+1.79%
1946	2,677	−1.01%
1954	3,119	+1.93%
1962	3,850	+2.67%
1968	4,273	+1.75%
1975	4,575	+0.98%
1982	5,214	+1.89%
1990	5,793	+1.32%
1999	6,152	+0.67%
2007	6,345	+0.39%
2012	6,143	−0.64%
2017	6,155	+0.04%
2023	6,412	+0.68%

Source: EHESS and INSEE

== Climate ==
Embrun features an oceanic climate (Cfb) with strong continental influences (Dfb). Winters are rather cold and snowy. Winter nights are very cold (about −3 °C (27 °F)) compare to the other French cities. That's because Embrun is very far from the French coasts, and near the mountains. It creates a severe climate throughout the year. In spite of the cold winters, summers tend to be hot and hazy. The afternoon average temperatures are around 28 °C (82 °F), but can sometimes exceed 35 °C (95 °F).

Climate data for Embrun, elevation 873 m (2,864 ft), (1991–2020 normals, extremes 1947–present)
Month	Jan	Feb	Mar	Apr	May	Jun	Jul	Aug	Sep	Oct	Nov	Dec	Year
Record high °C (°F)	19.0 (66.2)	21.5 (70.7)	24.3 (75.7)	28.4 (83.1)	32.3 (90.1)	38.4 (101.1)	36.7 (98.1)	37.1 (98.8)	33.5 (92.3)	27.5 (81.5)	22.5 (72.5)	17.7 (63.9)	38.4 (101.1)
Mean daily maximum °C (°F)	7.2 (45.0)	9.0 (48.2)	13.3 (55.9)	16.4 (61.5)	20.4 (68.7)	24.8 (76.6)	27.8 (82.0)	27.7 (81.9)	22.6 (72.7)	17.4 (63.3)	11.3 (52.3)	7.4 (45.3)	17.1 (62.8)
Daily mean °C (°F)	2.4 (36.3)	3.4 (38.1)	7.2 (45.0)	10.2 (50.4)	14.1 (57.4)	18.0 (64.4)	20.6 (69.1)	20.5 (68.9)	16.1 (61.0)	11.8 (53.2)	6.4 (43.5)	2.9 (37.2)	11.1 (52.0)
Mean daily minimum °C (°F)	−2.4 (27.7)	−2.2 (28.0)	1.1 (34.0)	4.0 (39.2)	7.7 (45.9)	11.2 (52.2)	13.3 (55.9)	13.3 (55.9)	9.6 (49.3)	6.2 (43.2)	1.6 (34.9)	−1.6 (29.1)	5.2 (41.4)
Record low °C (°F)	−19.1 (−2.4)	−18.8 (−1.8)	−13.9 (7.0)	−6.3 (20.7)	−3.2 (26.2)	−0.8 (30.6)	3.4 (38.1)	3.4 (38.1)	−0.4 (31.3)	−5.3 (22.5)	−11.2 (11.8)	−15.6 (3.9)	−19.1 (−2.4)
Average precipitation mm (inches)	51.0 (2.01)	42.9 (1.69)	49.5 (1.95)	57.0 (2.24)	69.3 (2.73)	61.1 (2.41)	49.2 (1.94)	52.1 (2.05)	64.6 (2.54)	81.8 (3.22)	84.6 (3.33)	69.5 (2.74)	732.6 (28.84)
Average precipitation days (≥ 1.0 mm)	5.9	4.6	5.9	7.5	9.3	8.2	6.4	7.0	6.6	7.8	7.8	7.0	83.9
Average snowy days	8.4	7.3	5.6	2.4	0.2	0.0	0.0	0.0	0.0	0.2	3.0	6.2	33.3
Average relative humidity (%)	66	64	61	61	64	65	59	62	66	68	68	66	64.2
Mean monthly sunshine hours	160.1	178.8	225.8	208.0	222.4	263.9	292.1	268.7	227.1	181.1	144.5	138.6	2,510.9
Source 1: Meteociel
Source 2: Infoclimat.fr (humidity, snowy days 1961–1990)

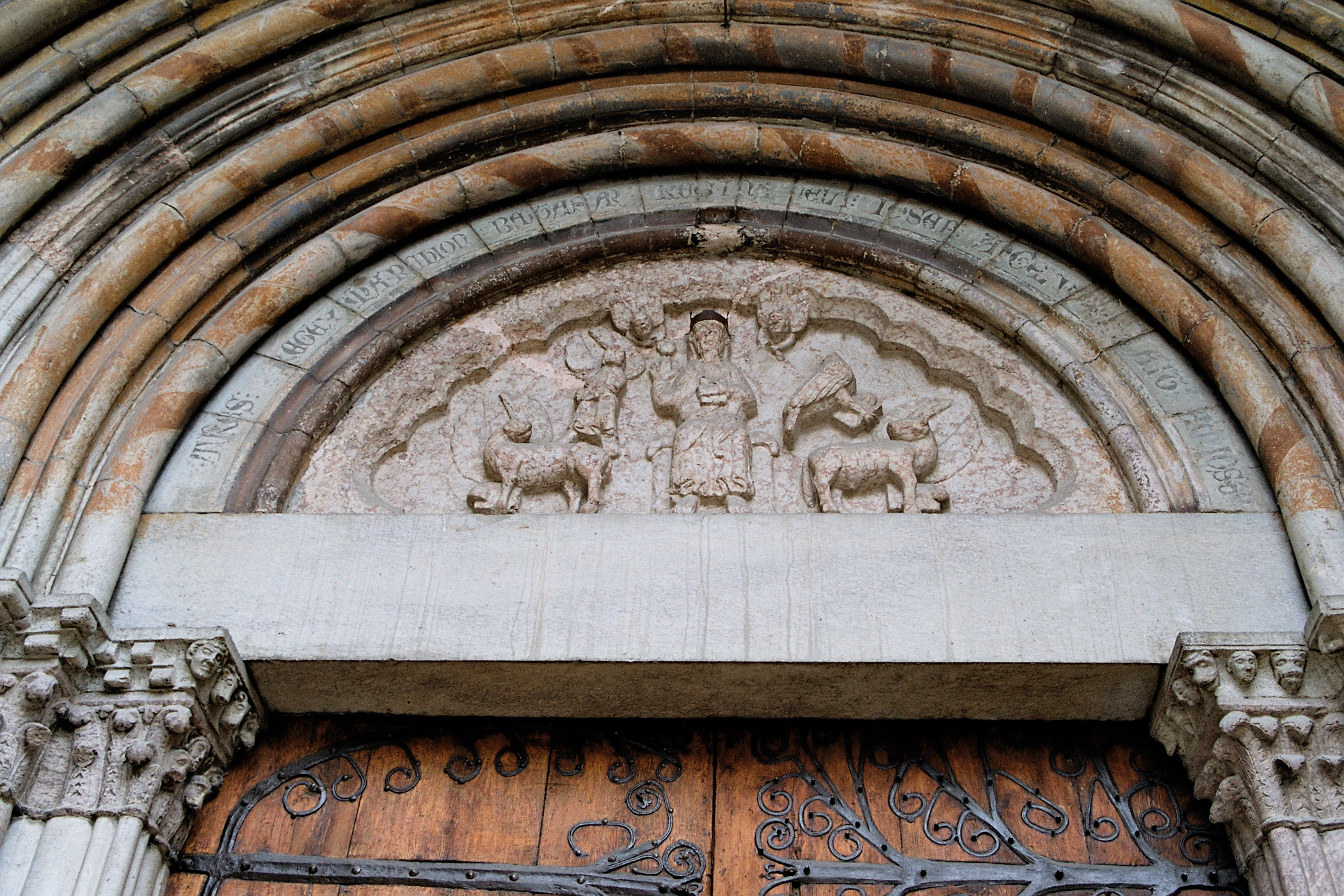
Our Lady of Embrun cathedral: the tympanum on the northern side portal.

== Transport ==
- Espace Delaroche R.Alpine Meilleure Embrun

The commune is served by Gare d’Embrun train station, which is connected to Paris by a night train (Intercités de nuit), and also by TER regional trains to Gap station, La Brillanne-Oraison, and intermediate train stations. There are also buses and a single bus-tram line.

== Notable people ==
- Henri Arnaud (1643 in Embrun – 1721) a pastor of the Waldensians in Piedmont, who turned soldier.
- François Jullien (born 1951 in Embrun) a French philosopher, Hellenist and sinologist.
- Coraline Hugue (born 1984 in Embrun), former Olympic cross-country skier.

== See also ==
- Embrun Cathedral
- Écrins National Park
- Communes of the Hautes-Alpes department
