= Gap, Hautes-Alpes =

Gap
- Prefecture and commune
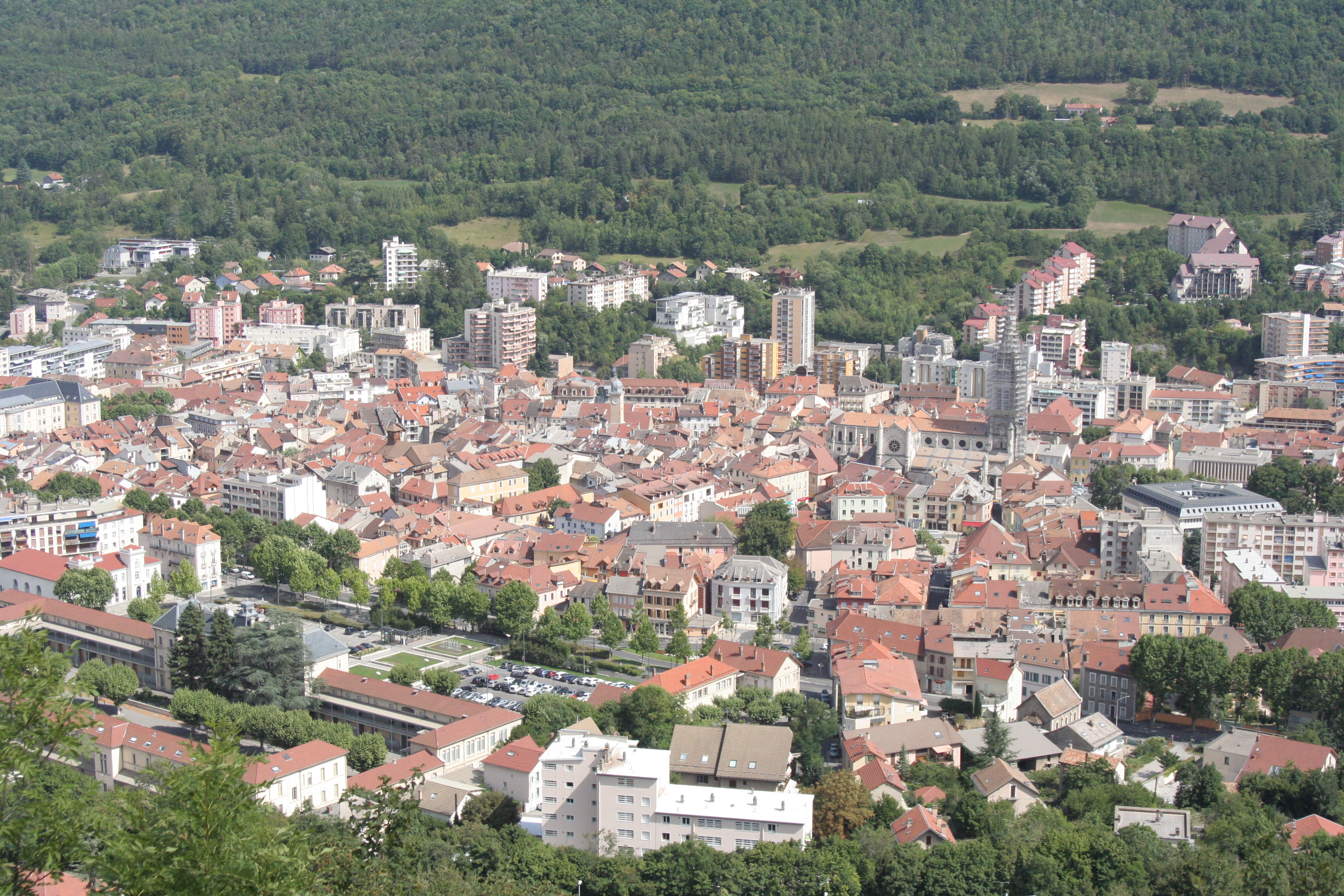
- Gap seen from Puymare Hill

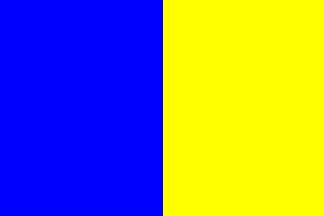
- Flag Coat of arms
- Location of Gap
- Location within France Location within Provence-Alpes-Côte d'Azur
- Coordinates: 44°33′34″N 6°04′43″E
- Country: France
- Region: Provence-Alpes-Côte d'Azur
- Department: Hautes-Alpes
- Arrondissement: Gap
- Canton: Gap-1, 2, 3 and 4
- Intercommunality: CA Gap-Tallard-Durance

Government
  - Mayor (2026–32): Roger Didier
- Area^{1}: 110.43 km^{2} (42.64 sq mi)
- Elevation: 745 m (2,444 ft)
- Highest elevation: 2,360 m (7,740 ft)
- Lowest elevation: 625 m (2,051 ft)
- Population (2023): 41,293
  - Density: 373.93/km^{2} (968.47/sq mi)
- Demonym: Gapençais
- Time zone: UTC+01:00 (CET)
  - Summer (DST): UTC+02:00 (CEST)
- INSEE/Postal code: 05061 /05000
- ^{1} French Land Register data, which excludes lakes, ponds, glaciers > 1 km^{2} (0.386 sq mi or 247 acres) and river estuaries.

Gap (French pronunciation: [ɡap], Occitan: [ˈɡap]) is the prefecture of the department of Hautes-Alpes, in the region of Provence-Alpes-Côte d'Azur, southern France. With a population of about 41,000, it is the most populated city in Hautes-Alpes. At a height of 750 metres above sea level, to the south of the Écrins Massif, it is also France's highest prefecture.

Together with other Alpine towns, Gap engages in the Alpine Town of the Year Association for the implementation of the Alpine Convention to achieve sustainable development in the Alpine Arc. Gap was awarded Alpine Town of the Year in 2002. In 2013 Gap was named the sportiest city in France by the national sports newspaper L'Équipe.

== Toponymy ==
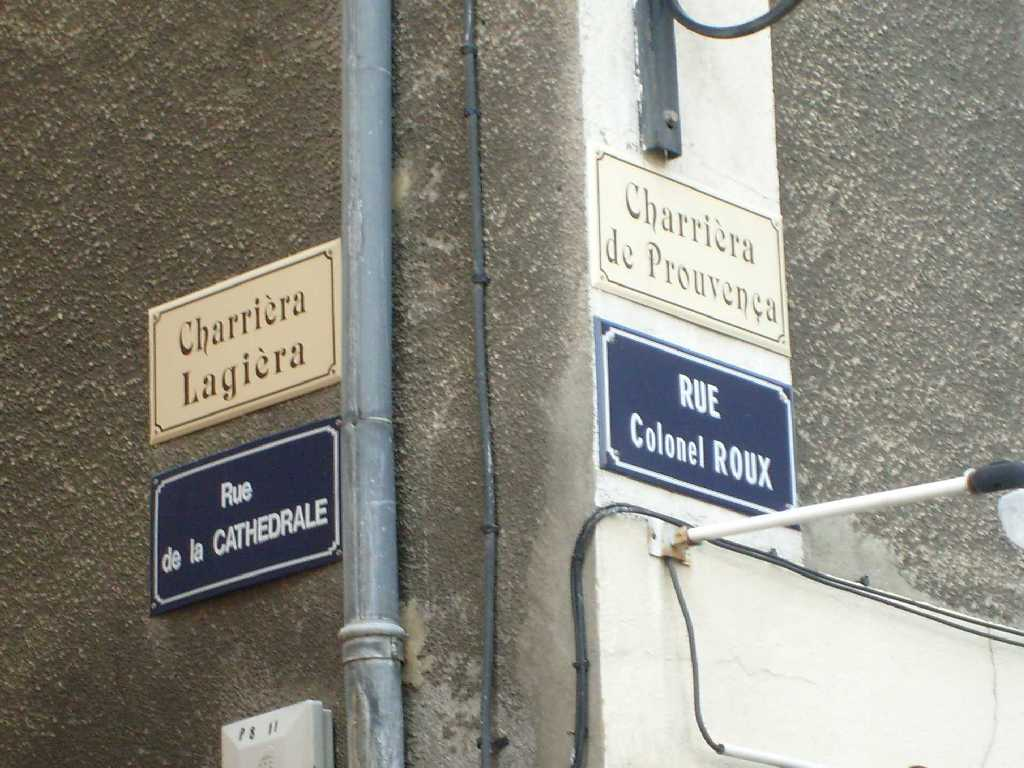
Bilingual signage in Alpine Provençal and in French at Gap

The first attestation of the name of the city is located in the ancient texts as Vappincum, later reduced to Vappum, the form of Gap is found in the 13th century.

The toponym Vappincum is analyzed on the basis of a radical Vapp- unknown meaning, and the suffix -incu of Ligurian origin found in Provence and the Massif central to the Alps (cf. Arlanc, Nonenque, Moirans and Morencum in the 10th century and Lemenc, a district of Chambéry, formerly Lemencum). The Gap form actually began as the short form Vappum, well attested, by the final drop.

The v- has been radically treated as a w- Germanic, where *Wap, then Gap (see for this type of evolution the wasp, Latin vespa, treats words as *wespa; mistletoe, Latin viscum, treated as *wiscum, etc., (Note: However, these terms have not been of Germanic influence in the other Romance languages, including Provençal : Latin vespa > Provençal vespa, Latin viscum > Provençal vesc.) depending on the phonetic path [w] > [gw] > [g]). This phonetic evolution would be more specifically made under the influence of the Gothic language.

The name in Provençal (Alpine) is also Gap.

== History ==
=== Prehistory ===
The first settlement of Gap dates back to the Neolithic. The culture of these first inhabitants belonged to the southern Chasséen.

Very rare testimonies of the pre-Roman era are formed by the remains of an oppidum located at the summit of the hill of Saint-Mens with few visible traces of a dolmen uncovered in 1866 and an ancient cemetery in the hamlet of Pré Camargue; but no remains were kept of these last two findings. Gallic money was also found. Gap was the capital of the Celto-Ligurian Tricorii tribe. These peoples, probably belonging to the Caturiges tribe, spoke the Celtic language.

=== The Roman period ===
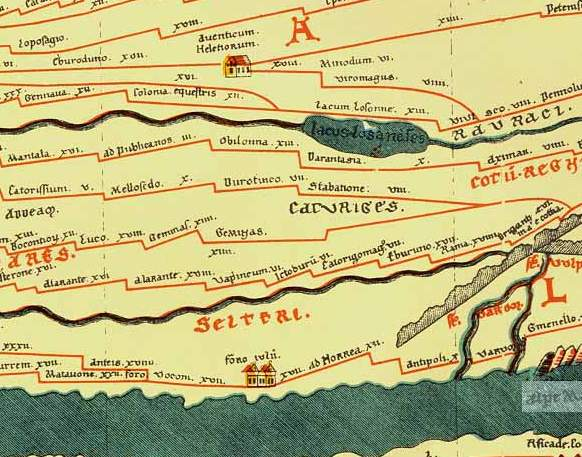
Roman roads in the Alps, during the 4th century

The Gapençais was then part of the territory of the Tricorii, a Gallic people who were Romanised during the conquest of Gallia Narbonensis in 125-124 BC, and whose capitals were Luc-en-Diois and Vaison.

Around 20 BC, Cottius, a leader of tribes of the Valley of Suze, allied to Rome, and urged by Augustus, undertook the building of a route of communication in the Valley of the Durance. He had get the submission of the peoples of the area who were eager to maintain their independence. This route, built between 14 and 6 BC, and which received the name of Via Cottia per Alpem, linked Turin to Sisteron and consisted of six stations. Then known as Vapincum, the town of Gap was founded from one of these stations. In 22 AD, Gap became the start of a Roman road to Valence.

At this time, the location of the future city was a Roman camp. The camp was protected by a terraced wall surrounded by a ditch. It was the largest between Montgenèvre and Sisteron. The garrison that occupied it could be estimated at 360 men. They came from the surrounding peoples. They were assigned to protect users of the Roman roads against brigands. Later, an axis towards the Champsaur was created. The Gap site took importance by becoming a hub of communications.

The economy was mainly pastoral and the first crops grew on the slopes of Puymaure. Some houses were built on stilts as shown by excavations.

During the first centuries, the population increased significantly. Towards the end of the 3rd century and 4th century, fortifications were built to protect the central core of the town. These completely surrounded the enclosure with walls and eleven towers. With an enclosed area of 2 hectares (4.9 acres) the center of the town formed a big village.

=== Middle Ages ===
From 28 December 986, the Bishop of Gap had sovereign rights over the city due to concerns about future Muslim invasions. The bishops kept this power until Revolutionary reforms in 1801 despite Gap being annexed by the French crown in 1512.

Gap and its area became part of the County of Provence which was established at the end of the 10th century. The County of Forcalquier was separated in the 12th century. Although the bishops of Gap were the temporal lords of the city their control was long disputed by officers of the Counts of Forcalquier notably during the episcopacy of Arnoux who later became the bishop of the city. On the death of the last Count of Forcalquier in 1209, the Embrun and Gap areas were passed to the Dauphiné while those of Forcalquier and Sisteron returned to the County of Provence. It is for this reason that the current coat of arms of the Region Provence-Alpes-Côte d'Azur bears also the coat of arms of the Dauphiné. In 1349 the Dauphin of Viennois Humbert II passed on his Principality to the eldest son of Philippe VI of France, the future King of France Charles V. From 1349 to 1457 Dauphiné remained a Principality separated from France, whose prince was the eldest son of the King of France. In 1457, Charles VII put an end to this status and joined the province to the Kingdom of France.

The Knights Templar owned a house at Gap, a secondary establishment which depended on a commandery. The creation of the Consulate, which ruled the city, dated back to before 1209.

In the 14th century, the city took advantage of the benefits of the installation of the Popes in Avignon, which brought a more frequent passage of travellers to develop a craft of wool and skins, which made it thrive. Avignon linkages were strengthened by the presence of many clerics of the entourage of the Pope, within the chapter of the canons of Gap.

=== Renaissance and early modern era ===
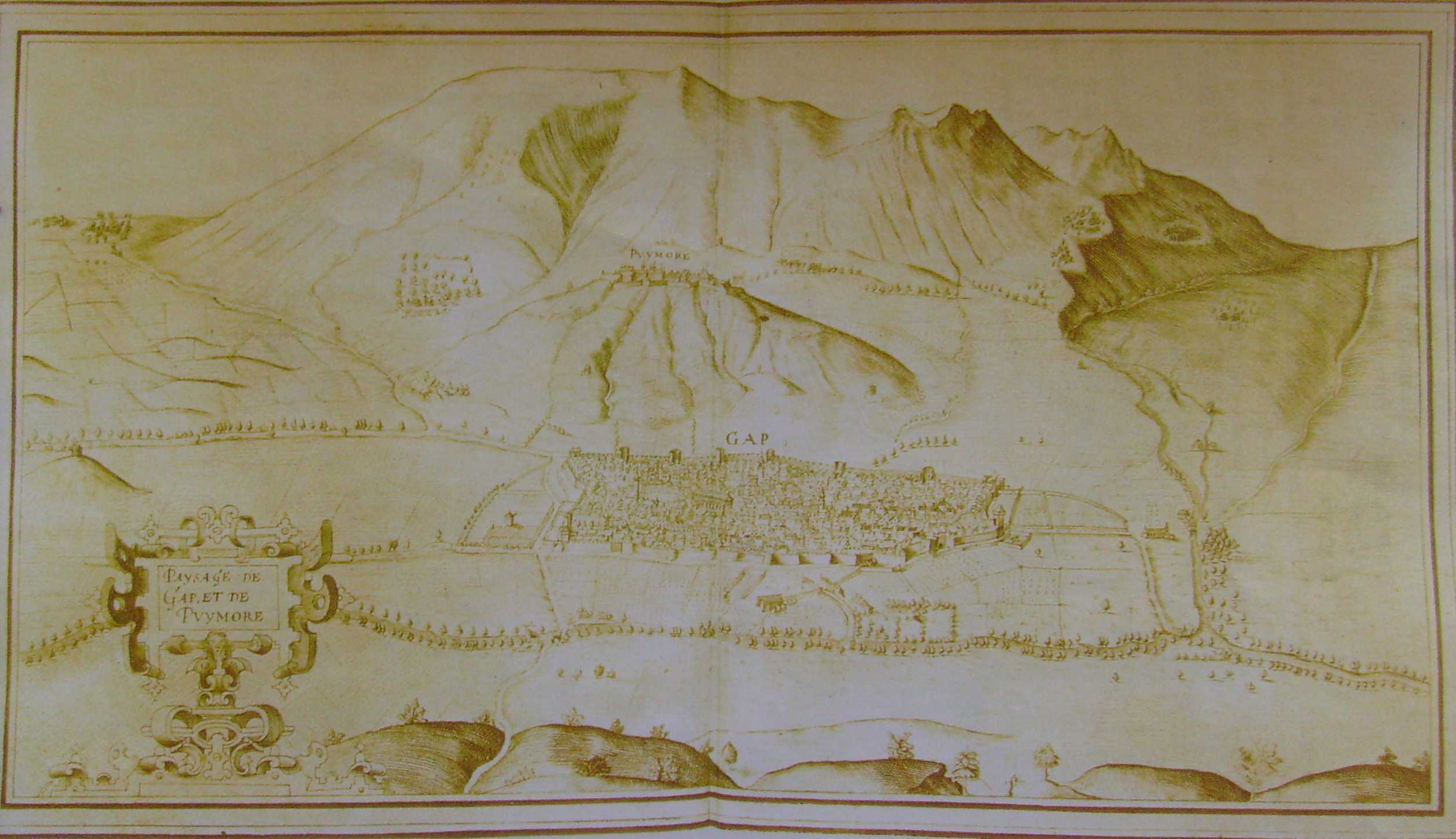
Gap in 1607

The 16th and 17th centuries were particularly dark times for the city. The Wars of Religion were lethal in the region. Gap was a Catholic stronghold, while the Champsaur switched to Protestantism. After various skirmishes, François de Bonne, leader of the Protestants, decided to attack Gap, nevertheless protected by 20 towers. On the night of 3 January 1577, François Philibert, known as Cadet de Charance, opened the Saint-Arey gate, and allowed him to attack the city by surprise. To cries of "Kill! Kill!" his men proceeded in veritable butchery. De Bonne burned the cathedral, plundered the monasteries, appropriated the property of the inhabitants, and built a proud citadel on the Colline de Puymaure [Puymaure Hill] where it dominated over Gap. Returned to Catholicism in 1622, he abandoned all claims to the city.

In 1692, the troops of the Piedmontese ruler Victor Amadeus II, committed with the League of Augsburg, against France of Louis XIV, captured the city, abandoned by its inhabitants, on 29 August. Gap was looted and burned, of the 953 houses in the commune, 798 were destroyed. This was part of the Invasion of Dauphine in 1692.

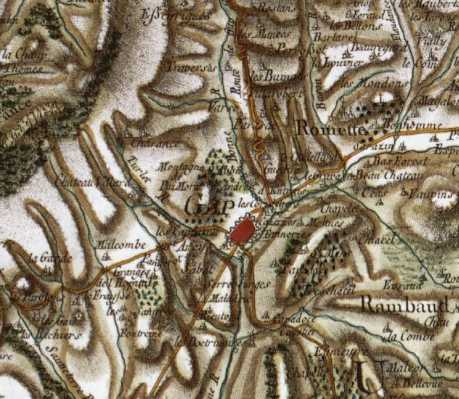
Gap at the end of the 18th century

In 1790, during the French Revolution, the province of Dauphiné was divided into three departments: Drôme, Isère and Hautes-Alpes which Gap became the prefecture. Hautes-Alpes then became the highest Department of France and Gap, the highest prefecture of the country. It remains prefecture of Haute-Alpes to this day.

=== 19th century ===
In 1802, the baron Charles-François de Ladoucette was appointed Prefect of the Hautes-Alpes. Under his administration, the city of Gap and the Department of the Hautes-Alpes experienced some growth. It built roads linking Gap to Italy and the Drôme Valley and created a departmental nursery. His statue, carved by the Gap sculptor Jean Marcellin, was erected in 1866 at the square which bears his name.

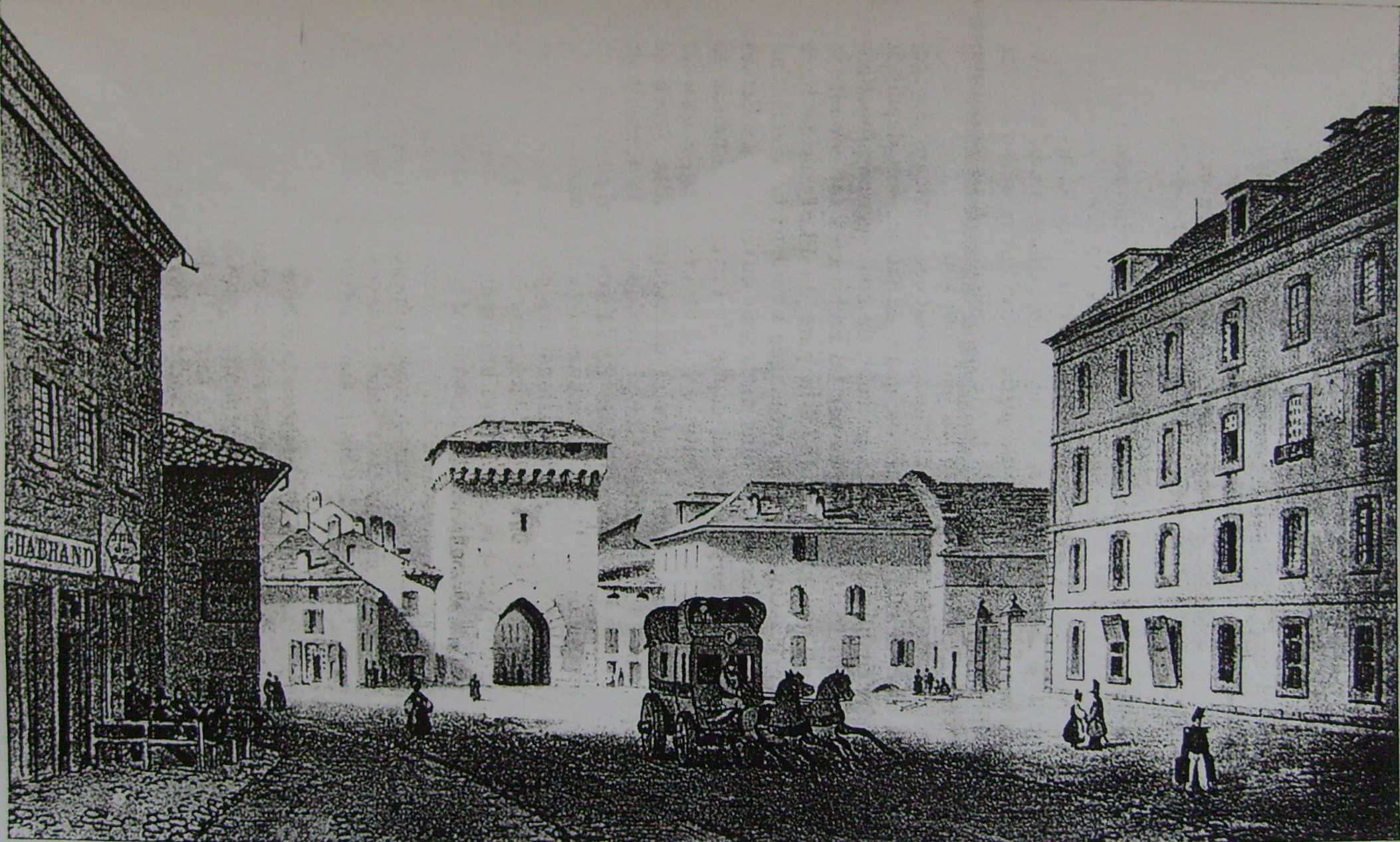
Gap, the Lignole Gate in 1830

Napoleon I left Elba in February 1815 and stopped at Gap on 5 March 1815 with 40 horsemen and 10 grenadiers, where he had thousands of copies of his Proclamations printed. The whole population of the city accompanied Napoleon when he left Gap. Acknowledging the reception of the population of these regions, he left the Haut-Alpins with the following message:

The inhabitants of the departments of the high and low Alps, citizens,

I was deeply touched by all the feelings that you have shown me, your wishes are granted. The cause of the Nation will triumph again. You're right to call me your father; I live for the honour and happiness of France. My return banishes all your concerns; it ensures the conservation of all properties, equality among all classes and the rights you have enjoyed for the last 25 years, and after which our fathers have so yearned, forming today a part of your existence.

In all circumstances where I find myself, I will always remember with great interest all that I've seen through your country.

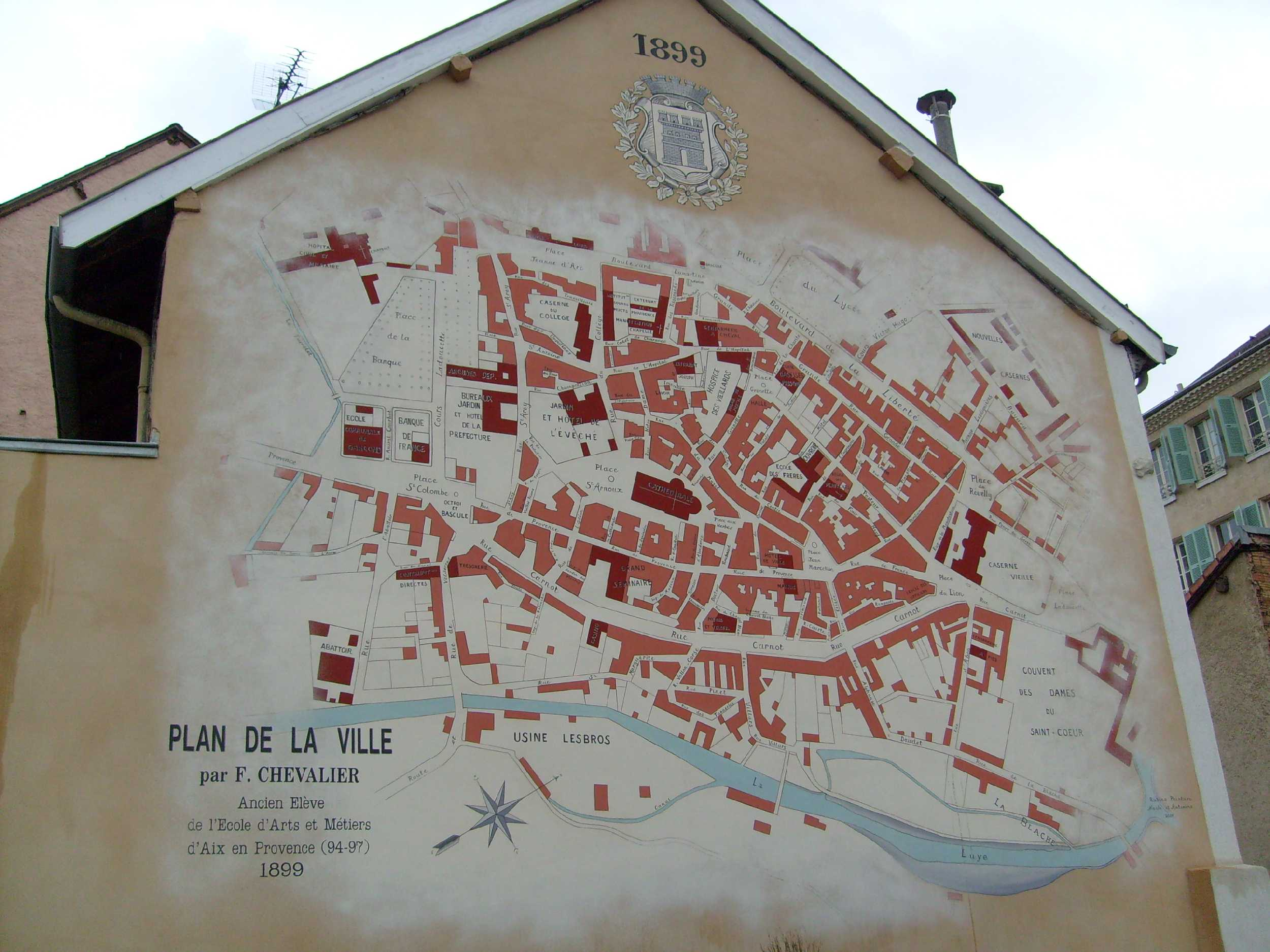
Fresco of the city center of Gap in 1899

Gap experienced a new era from 1875 with the arrival of the railway.

The commune of Chaudun was joined with Gap, by the prefectoral Decree of 22 October 1895.

=== 20th century ===
==== Second World War ====
During World War II, the city was part of the free zone. But after November 1942 and the Case Anton, it was integrated into the occupied area. After Operation Overlord on 6 June 1944, the Germans placed some 1,000 men to hold the cuvette de Gap [Gap Basin], a key point of the Cannes-Lyon axis. Jean Drouot-L'Hermine, 37 years old, an original Gaullist resistant and accomplished soldier (he had trained more than 4000 resistance fighters in combat and about a hundred in sabotage) was sent by the GPRF of General de Gaulle to liberate the city on behalf of the Resistance. Aided by local guerrillas and resistance, he has however no way to take the city by force. He then started with his men in a campaign of sabotage and bombings that lasted more than a month. After having isolated the city by destroying the infrastructure surrounding it (overpasses, railway lines, bridges, etc.), the FFI had managed to rally the population and give the occupiers an impression of encirclement.

A mid-August 1944, Drouot-L'Hermine, who lost his right-hand man, Paul Héraud, a few days earlier, sent two emissaries to negotiate the surrender of the Germans. The Germans were convinced of facing a large-scale uprising, and agreed to lay down their weapons provided that it was to regular troops (they refused, therefore, to surrender to the Resistance). While the Americans were more than 50 kilometres (31 mi) away, time was pressing for Drouot-L'Hermine. Indeed, he received an order from De Gaulle to liberate the city before the arrival of the Allies, to support the position of France as a victorious nation, liberated through the active participation of the Resistance. Drouot-L'Ermine then developed a new ploy. He managed to convince the Allies to advance one of their tanks into enemy terrain, and shoot a few rounds close to Gap. Shots echoed in the valley, and the Germans immediately identified the characteristic sound of a tank, a weapon that the guerrillas did not hold. Thinking they were then dealing with the Allies, the troops of the Reich surrendered to the Resistance. Therefore, a few hundred resistance fighters were able to capture 1,200 German soldiers, including 40 officers. The city was liberated on the evening of 19 August 1944.

==== Fifth Republic ====
The commune of Romette was associated with that of Gap, by decree dated 25 November 1974.

Aerial photographs of Gap from the 20th century

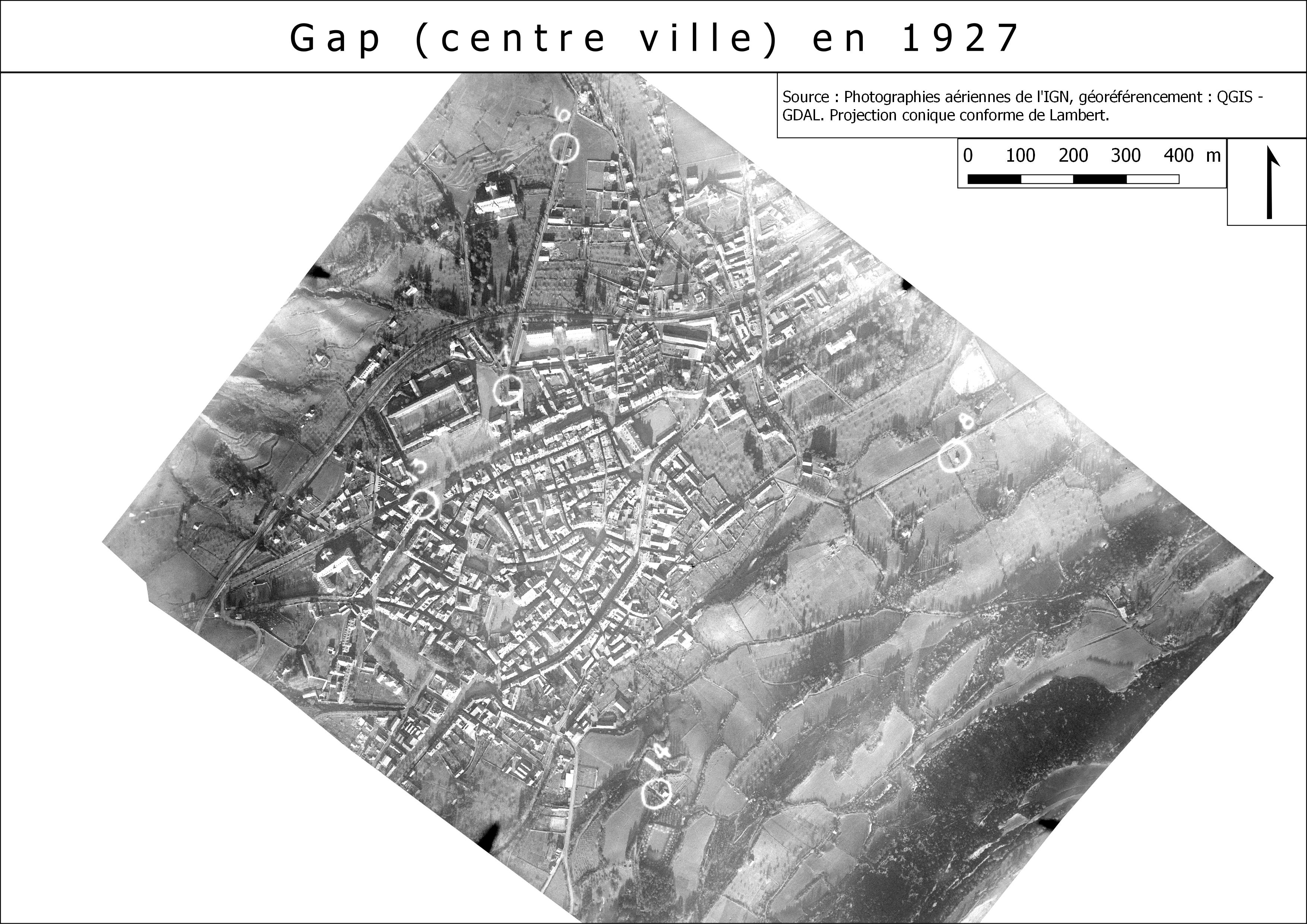
An aerial photograph of Gap (IGN) from 1927

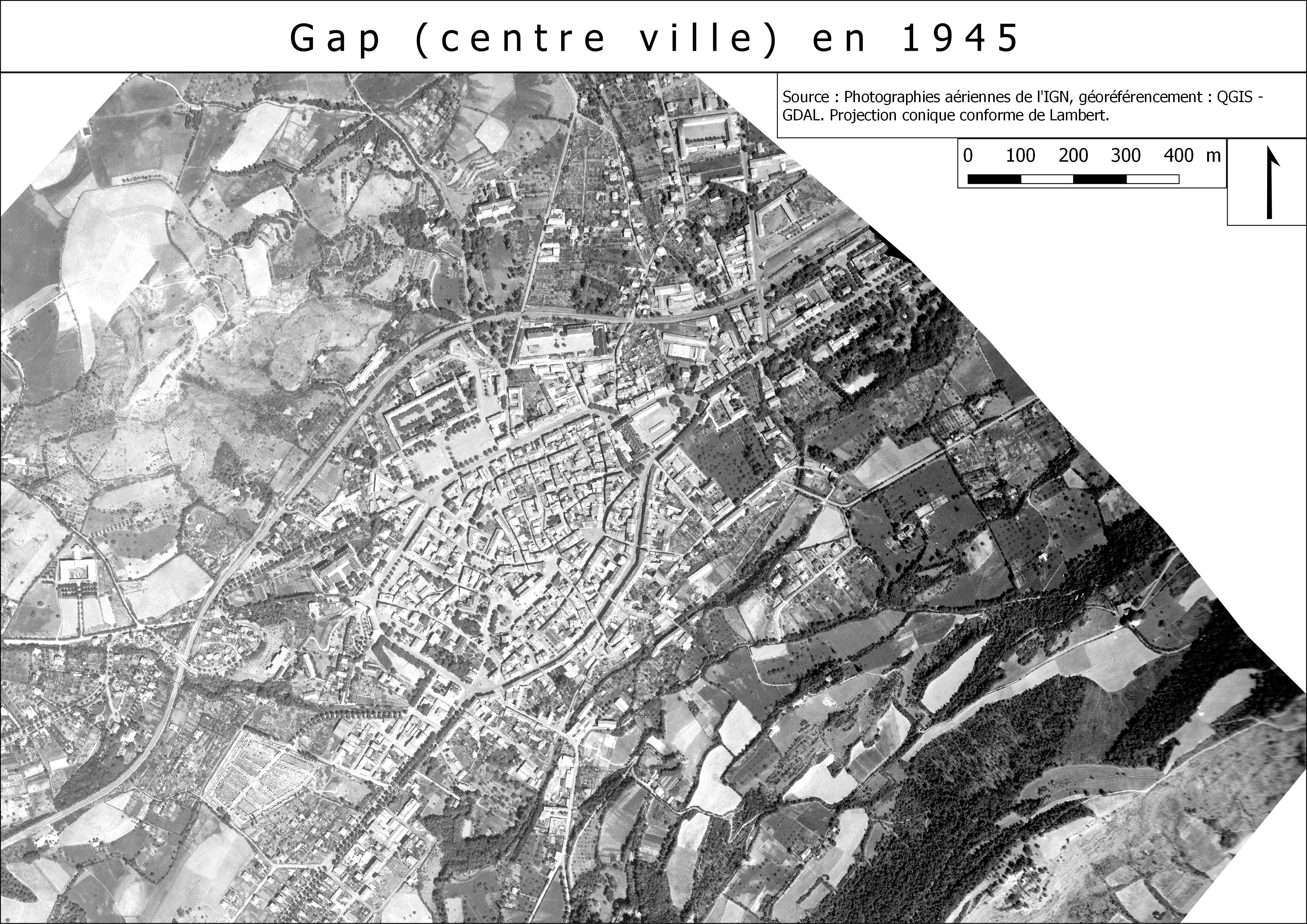
An aerial photograph of Gap (IGN) from 1945

Gap ran a bid to host the 2018 Winter Olympics, but lost out as France's candidate to nearby Annecy. The games were eventually awarded to Pyeongchang in South Korea.

== Geography ==
=== Location ===
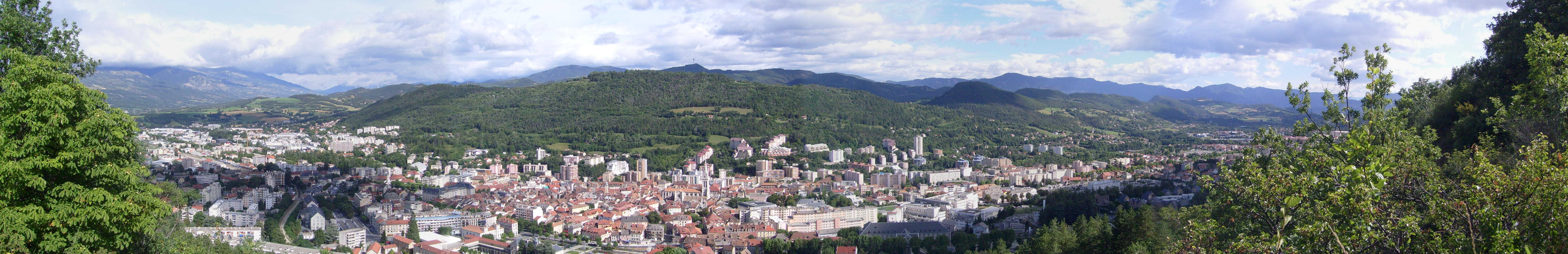
A panoramic view of Gap

An Alpine crossroads at the intersection of D994 and the Route nationale 85, or Route Napoléon, which crosses the Col Bayard north of the city, Gap is located between the historic Dauphiné and the Provence-Alpes-Côte d'Azur administrative region. With its 40,559 inhabitants (2018), it is the main town of an urban area of 80,555 inhabitants (2018), and the main town of the Southern French Alps. 745 metres (2,400 ft) above sea level, at the right bank of the river Luye, close to where it joins the Durance to the north, Gap is in the midst of a rich and preserved natural environment, south-west of the Écrins National Park, south-east of the Dévoluy massif and west of the Lac de Serre-Ponçon. The region around Gap is known as Gapençais.

=== Geology and terrain ===
The commune of Gap is almost entirely located in the Sillon de Gap [Gap trench], a wide valley bottom located about 735 metres (2,411 ft) above sea level and including the western slopes almost 2,000 metres (6,600 ft) (Charance mountain and pic de Gleize).

The highest point of the municipality is however outside this great valley, on another watershed slope, the Raz de Bec, at 2,385 metres (7,825 ft), is within the limits of the commune, and was in the former commune of Chaudun, which merged with Gap in the 19th century.

This valley was shaped by the Glacier de la Durance during the last ice age, known as the Würm glaciation.

Thus, soils are very often formed by moraine deposits. No less than five levels of lateral and frontal moraines are observable. These are clearly visible, especially on the southern slopes of the Col Bayard, where they were formed in places of the terraces used by agriculture.

In retreating, the glacier also left erratics of several metres high. Examples include, among others, the erratic boulders of Peyre-Ossel and Justice.

The glacier, which in the Quaternary has shaped the Sillon de Gap, presented several diffluences: one to the glacier of the Drac from the cols of Manse and Bayard and one towards the Buëch Valley by the La Freissinouse border.

The cover of morainic debris is omnipresent in the Sillon de Gap but is not the only vestige of the Quaternary glaciation. There is also the typical topography of glacial valleys. The location of the town of Gap corresponds to an Ombilic glaciaire, where large quantities of clay were deposited. Upstream lies the Verrou glaciaire [glacial lock] of Pont-Sarrazin and downstream of Tourronde.

The mechanical action of the glacier de la Durance was facilitated by the presence of relatively friable layers. The part which is central and south-east of the town consists mainly of soft rocks (Callovo-Oxfordian black marl). They consist of soft schist of bluish or brown colors. In the northwestern part are the harder rocks of lighter colours, Tithonian limestone, formed in places of rocky bars or cornices.

The geology and terrain of Gap

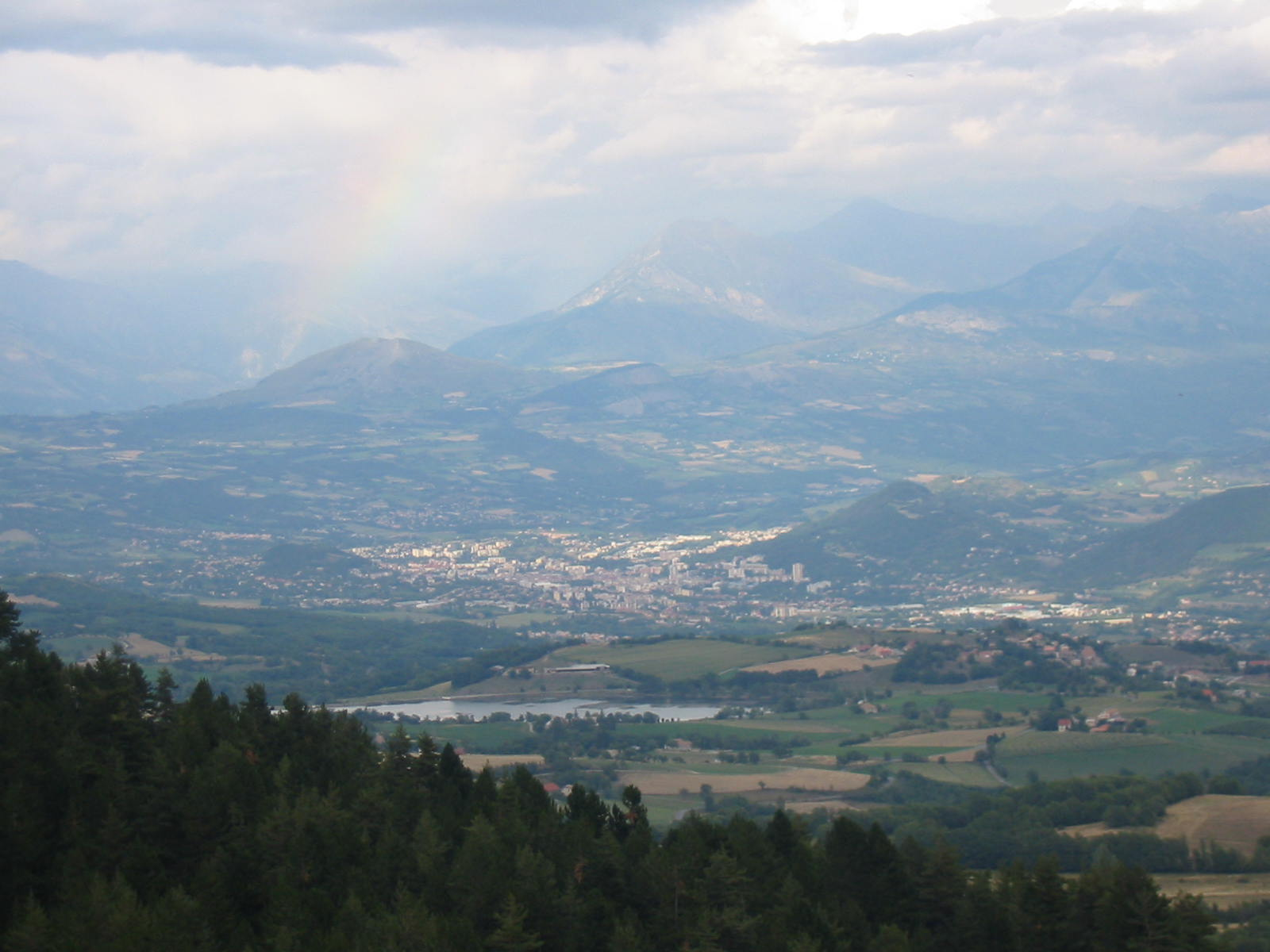
The Sillon de Gap (towards the north-east), a large glacial valley.

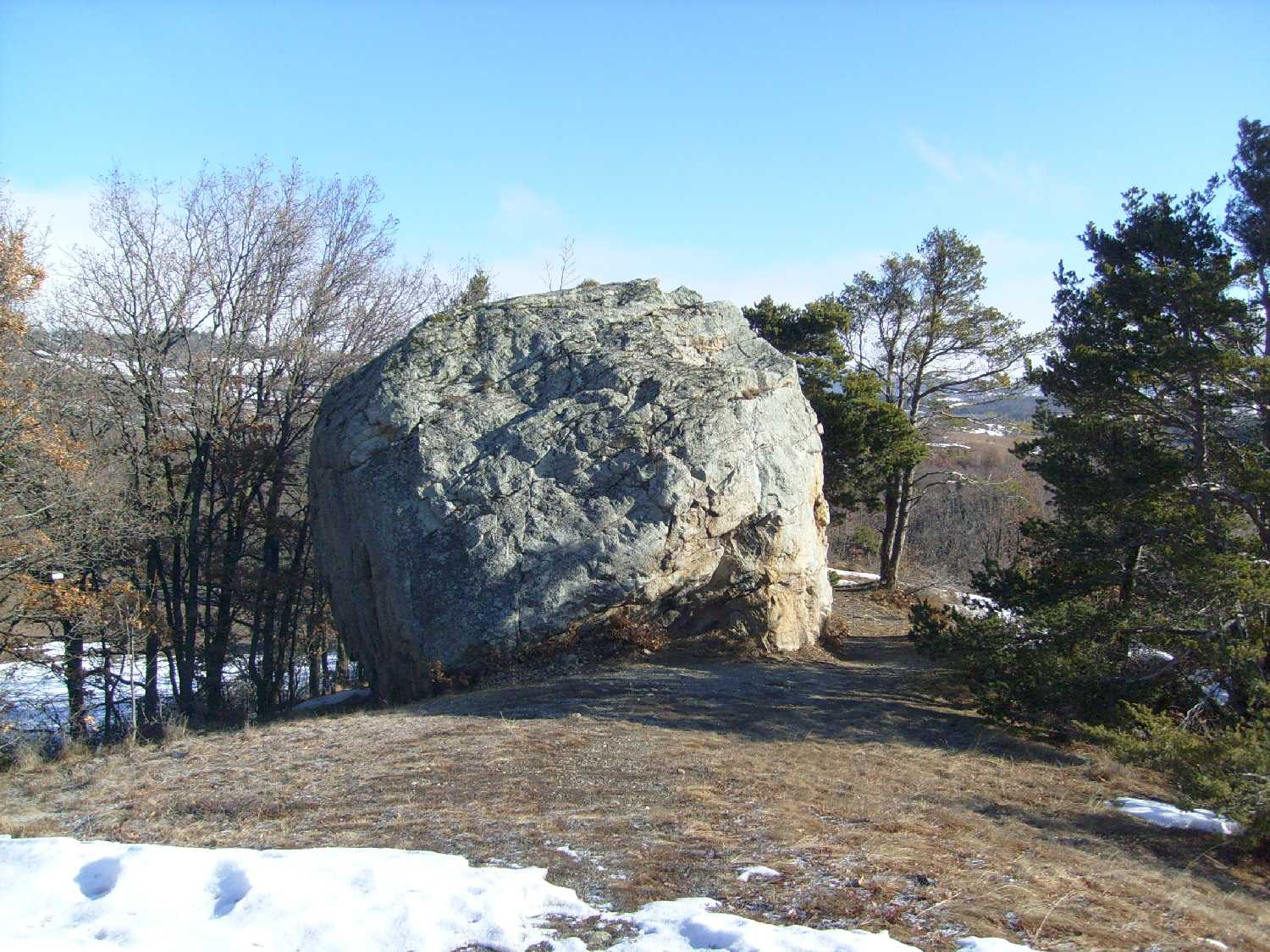
The glacial erratic of Peyre-Ossel placed on a lateral moraine

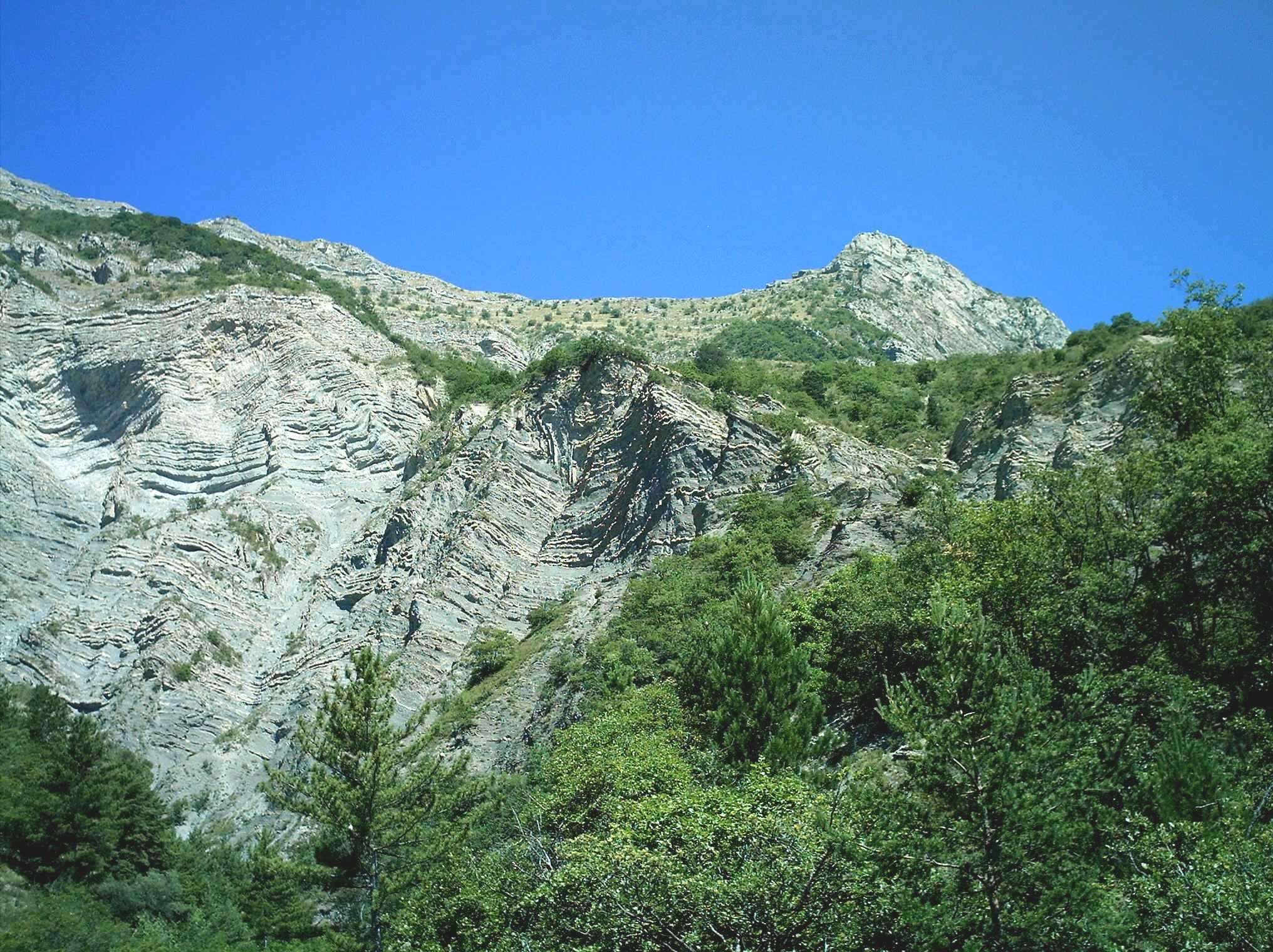
Limestone layers of the Pic du Charance

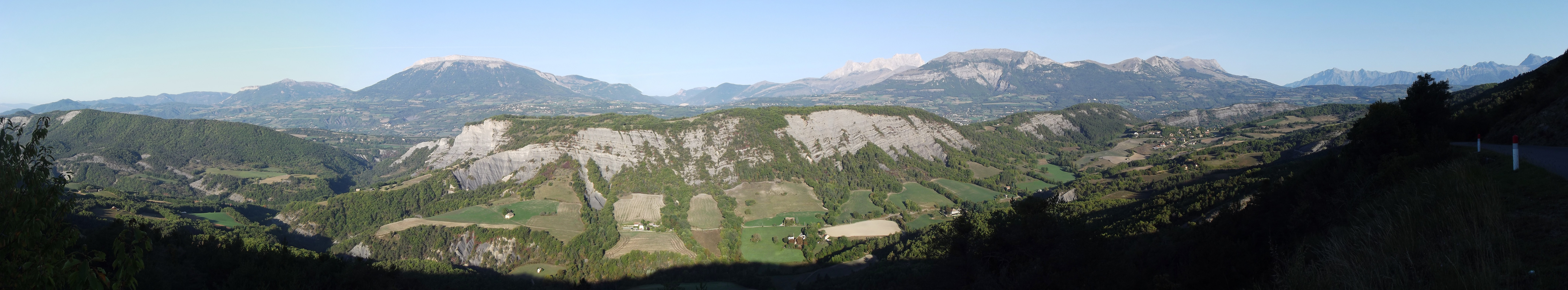
Southeast of the commune of Gap

=== Hydrography ===
The town of Gap is crossed by the Luye, a tributary of the Durance which has a total course of 22.6 kilometres (14.0 mi). During its passage through the commune, the Luye receives several torrents. It merges on the right bank with the 5.1 kilometres (3.2 mi) long Buzon, the Bonne (9.4 kilometres (5.8 mi)) and the torrent du Cristaye (2.4 kilometres (1.5 mi)); and on the left bank, the La Magdeleine Canal (5.3 kilometres (3.3 mi)), the Riotord (4.8 kilometres (3.0 mi)) and the torrent du Partiment, (6.7 kilometres (4.2 mi)) long.

Even if the Luye hydrographic basin represents the largest share of the commune, waters at the southwest of the commune (the Saint-Jean quarter) drain into the torrent of Malecombe, a tributary of the Rousine, which flows into the Durance south of Tallard.

In the Northwest of the commune (located on the other side of the col de Gleize) lie the Petit Buëch sources. Around 1,700 metres (5,600 ft) above sea level, they are formed by several streams which converge at the old village of Chaudun.

Finally, an important channel feeds Gap with drinking water and water for irrigation: The Canal de Gap, or Canal du Drac, about 30 kilometres (19 mi) long, leads the water captured in the Drac via a tunnel under the Col de Manse to the Jaussauds reservoir (altitude 1,141 metres (3,743 ft)) where it divides into two branches, including the main branch which bypasses Gap west to Correo through Charance.

Waters around Gap

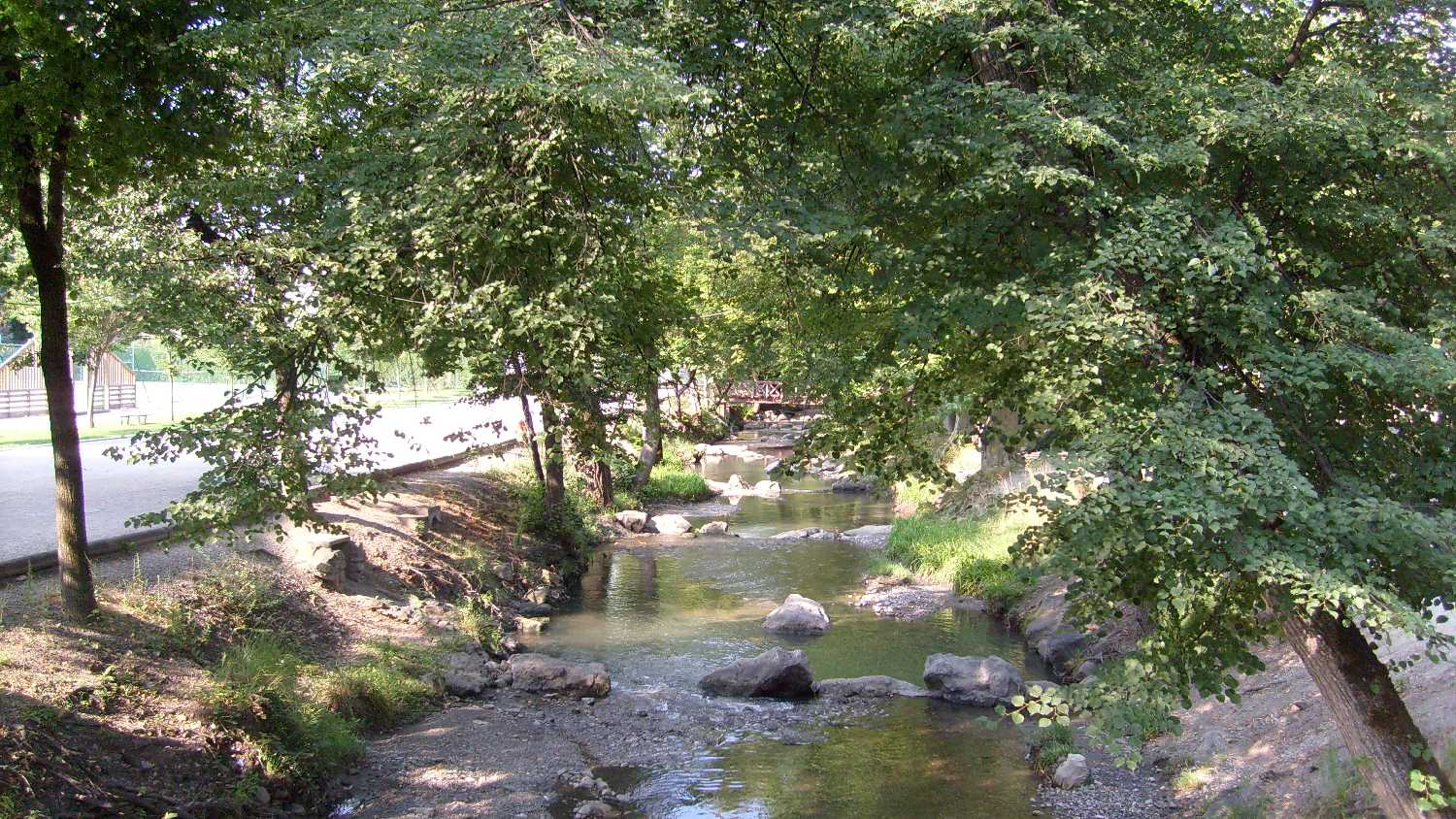
The Luye at Gap, near to the Parc de la Pépinière

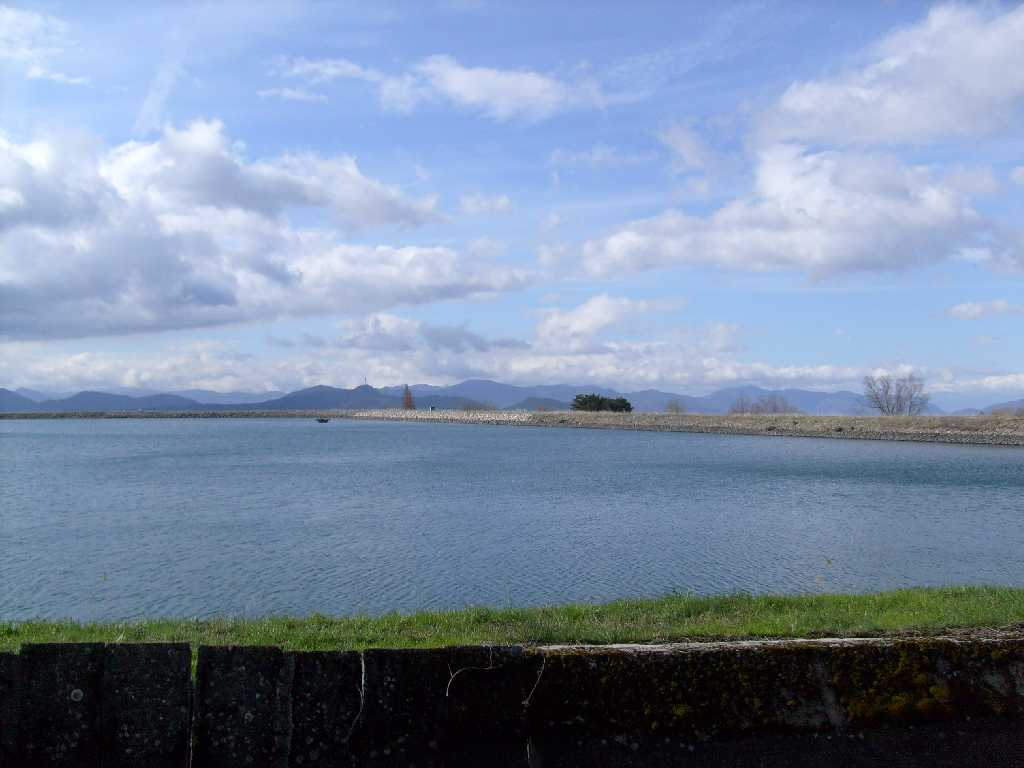
The lake of the Jaussauds Reservoir

=== Climate ===
Gap features an oceanic climate (Cfb), according to the Köppen system, with some continental influence due to its elevation. Very influenced by its interior position, the city experiences cold, snowy winters and warm summers.

Thus the main feature of the local climate is the importance of the sunshine enjoyed by the city. Furthermore, snowfall underscores the mountain character of the city. Thunderstorms are frequent in summer, fog is rather rare.

A meteorological comparison chart of data from Gap and other French cities
| City | Sunlight | Rain | Snow | Thunderstorm | Fog |
|---|---|---|---|---|---|
| Paris | 1797 h/yr | 642mm/yr | 15 days/yr | 19 days/yr | 13 days/yr |
| Nice | 2694 hrs/yr | 767mm/yr | 1 day/yr | 31 days/yr | 1 days/yr |
| Strasbourg | 1637 hrs/yr | 610mm/yr | 30 days/yr | 29 days/yr | 65 days/yr |
| Gap | 2940hrs/yr | 868mm/yr | 19.1 days/yr | 32 days/yr | 7 days/yr |
| National average | 1973 hrs/yr | 770mm/yr | 14 days/yr | 22 days/yr | 40 days/yr |

The tables below represent averages of monthly temperatures.

They also show the maximum and minimum mean temperatures over the period from 1951 to 1970.

Climate data for Gap, elevation 885 m (2,904 ft), (2003–2020 normals, extremes 2003–present)
| Month | Jan | Feb | Mar | Apr | May | Jun | Jul | Aug | Sep | Oct | Nov | Dec | Year |
|---|---|---|---|---|---|---|---|---|---|---|---|---|---|
| Record high °C (°F) | 20.0 (68.0) | 22.6 (72.7) | 23.7 (74.7) | 28.2 (82.8) | 32.5 (90.5) | 37.7 (99.9) | 36.9 (98.4) | 38.2 (100.8) | 33.0 (91.4) | 28.5 (83.3) | 21.7 (71.1) | 17.3 (63.1) | 38.2 (100.8) |
| Mean daily maximum °C (°F) | 6.7 (44.1) | 8.2 (46.8) | 12.6 (54.7) | 16.9 (62.4) | 20.2 (68.4) | 25.3 (77.5) | 28.3 (82.9) | 27.8 (82.0) | 23.5 (74.3) | 18.1 (64.6) | 11.2 (52.2) | 7.2 (45.0) | 17.2 (63.0) |
| Daily mean °C (°F) | 2.7 (36.9) | 3.4 (38.1) | 7.0 (44.6) | 10.9 (51.6) | 14.0 (57.2) | 18.5 (65.3) | 21.1 (70.0) | 20.6 (69.1) | 17.0 (62.6) | 12.6 (54.7) | 6.9 (44.4) | 3.2 (37.8) | 11.5 (52.7) |
| Mean daily minimum °C (°F) | −1.4 (29.5) | −1.4 (29.5) | 1.4 (34.5) | 4.8 (40.6) | 7.7 (45.9) | 11.6 (52.9) | 13.8 (56.8) | 13.4 (56.1) | 10.5 (50.9) | 7.1 (44.8) | 2.6 (36.7) | −0.7 (30.7) | 5.8 (42.4) |
| Record low °C (°F) | −10.6 (12.9) | −15.3 (4.5) | −10.6 (12.9) | −3.3 (26.1) | −0.1 (31.8) | 2.8 (37.0) | 4.7 (40.5) | 6.2 (43.2) | 0.4 (32.7) | −3.2 (26.2) | −8.8 (16.2) | −12.1 (10.2) | −15.3 (4.5) |
| Average precipitation mm (inches) | 68.2 (2.69) | 54.4 (2.14) | 62.9 (2.48) | 67.6 (2.66) | 86.0 (3.39) | 70.6 (2.78) | 47.2 (1.86) | 54.7 (2.15) | 56.5 (2.22) | 96.6 (3.80) | 103.2 (4.06) | 95.4 (3.76) | 863.3 (33.99) |
| Average precipitation days (≥ 1.0 mm) | 6.9 | 5.7 | 7.2 | 7.8 | 9.8 | 7.4 | 5.5 | 5.6 | 5.3 | 7.1 | 7.6 | 8.1 | 83.8 |
Source: Meteociel

Comparisons with surveys of the period from 1878 to 1940 showed lower maximum averages over the period from 1950 to 1970 for the winter and summer months. Over the same period, again for the winter and summer months, there was an increase in the average minimum. Thus the evolution of the climate tends towards a slight reduction of differences in winter temperatures on the one hand, and summer on the other.

Extreme temperatures also highlight the mountain and Mediterranean components of the climate. Indeed, over the decade 1951-1960 the absolute minimum recorded was −18 °C (−0.4 °F) on 3 February 1956. While the absolute maximum was of 36.5 °C (97.7 °F) observed 8 July 1952.

The evolution of the average monthly temperatures (in red) and an average monthly rainfall (in blue) are summarized in the chart below.

Temperatures and average monthly precipitation

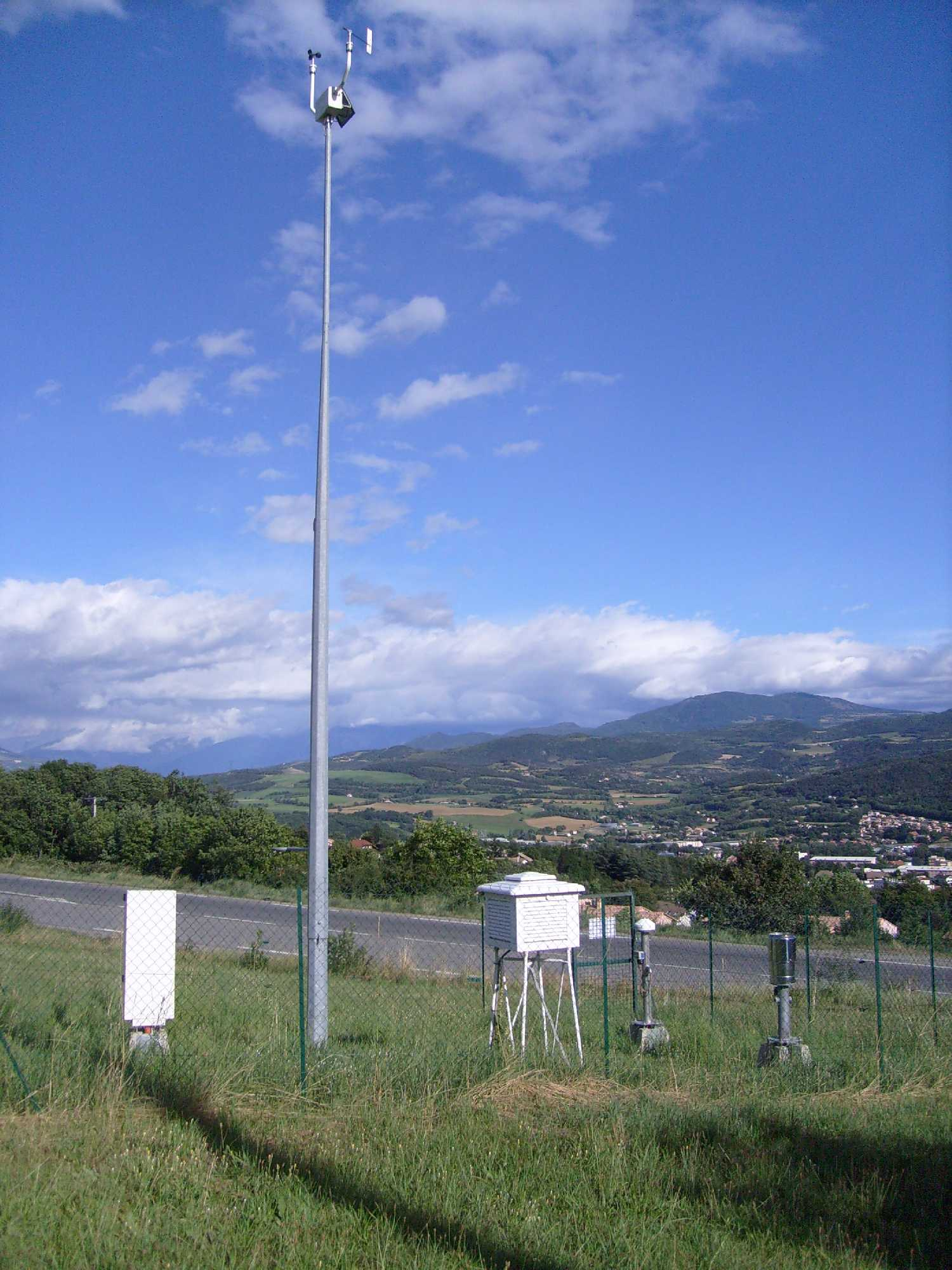
Weather Station Gap Varsie

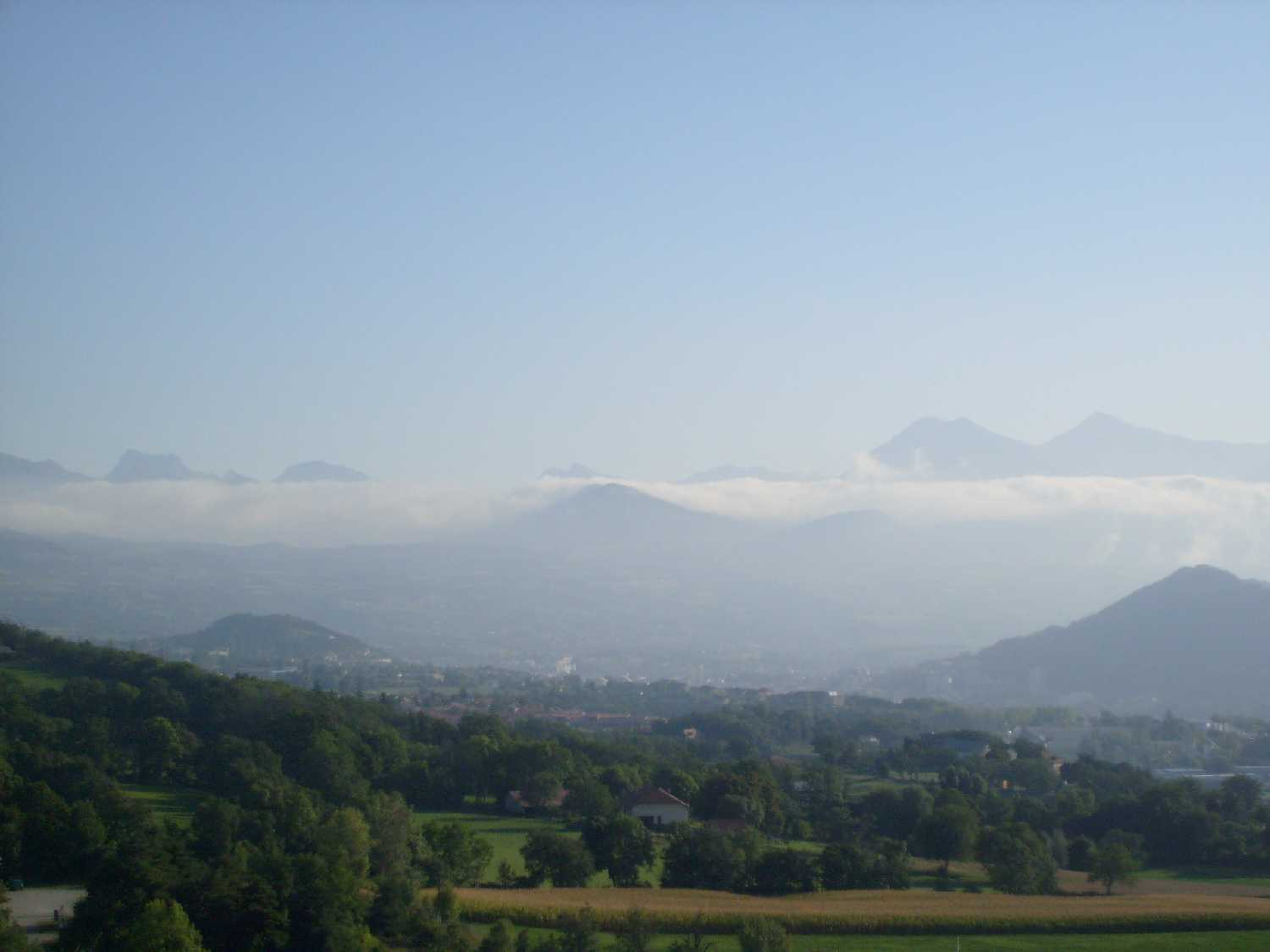
The "bar Bayard", synonymous with good weather over the city

Outside of the valley breezes, the prevailing wind is from the north, locally named the bise wind. In fact, it is a component of the mistral. Up the Drac Valley, this wind crosses the Bayard plateau down to Gap. When it carries clouds, there is the phenomenon of "the bar of Bayard": a compact pile of clouds caused by Lee waves covering the Bayard plateau. Pushed by the wind, they descend into the valley. Under the effect of the increase in pressure and temperature, these clouds disappear immediately a few hundred metres further down. Even in perpetual motion, cloud cover appears motionless. If these conditions are synonymous with freshness in autumn and spring, and bright cold in the winter, they are always accompanied by a perfectly sunny and clear atmosphere above the city.

=== Channels of communication and transport ===
Map of transport in Gap

==== Road network ====
The town of Gap lies at a crossroads. The route nationale RN 85 heads towards the north and the south, the RN 94 to the east and the departmental RD 994 road to the west.

The RN 85 travels 103 kilometres (64 mi) north to Grenoble. Sisteron is located 48 kilometres (30 mi) in the opposite direction, and eventually also to the Mediterranean. The RN 94 travels 87 kilometres (54 mi) to reach Briançon and towards Italy via the Col de Montgenèvre. Meanwhile, the RD 994 joins with Pont-Saint-Esprit in Gard, more than 150 kilometres (93 mi) distant.

15 km (9 mi) separates Gap from La Saulce on the A51 motorway. This highway provides fast travel to Aix-en-Provence and Marseille 170 kilometres (110 mi) away, via the Durance Valley. A planned extension of this highway to the north, to the Col du Fau seems definitively buried. Although it has been desired by elected officials for the voters and the State, in order to divert trucks from the A7, the absence of this highway has not created the announced decline. On the contrary, the city ceased to grow (see demographics) without being absorbed by its relatively distant neighbours thanks precisely to its relative isolation from the main road network, including Grenoble (in no effect a dormitory community).

Taking into account the increase in road traffic, the creation of an urban boulevard became a prospect of improvement. This one 9 kilometres (5.6 mi) long and comprising several structures, could bypass the city from the west. Concerning also the transit of traffic serving the city itself, it would act as a bypass, leaving the RN 85, close to the area of Micropolis to the southwest and lead to the RN 94, north-east towards the Romette intersection.

==== Rail ====
The city is served by SNCF. Gap station is connected directly to Paris daily by a night train, but also by regional trains to Briançon, Grenoble, Valence (Gare de Valence-Ville and Gare de Valence TGV), as well as to Aix-en-Provence and Marseille.

In the 1930s, work aimed at the establishment of a metric line between Gap and Corps by the Col de Manse was undertaken. These were never finished and the line of the Champsaur was never born. Portions were reused for the basis of the route nationale.

The line to Barcelonnette was also begun in the east, but never completed. A double curve viaduct remains beneath the waters of the Lac de Serre-Ponçon.

==== Air transport ====
Located 13 kilometres (8.1 mi) from Gap, the Gap–Tallard Airport can handle passenger traffic.

The company Air Alpes operated a DHC-6 Twin otter, with a regular service between Paris-Le Bourget and Gap from 1973 to 1977, since abandoned. The vast majority of air movements are sports-oriented.

Nearby airports
| Name | Destinations | Distance |
| Grenoble-Isère | Europe | 140 kilometres (87 mi) |
| Marseille-Provence | Europe, Africa, North America, Asia | 180 kilometres (110 mi) |
| Lyon-Saint-Exupéry | Europe, Africa, North America | 195 kilometres (121 mi) |
| Turin Caselle | Europe, Africa | 200 kilometres (120 mi) |

==== Urban transport ====
Public transport in the city is provided by the Linea network. In 2016, the network is comprised 12 lines. There is also a school transport service, a shuttle between Domaine de Gap-Charance/Centre-ville/Gap-Bayard runs in July and August, a shuttle to the hyper-Centre and a taxibus is available on demand. Aside from the taxibus, all of these are totally free services for users.

==== Cycling facilities ====
Several cycle paths traverse the city. Some are separate from the road network, others are cycle lanes alongside roads.

== Urbanism ==
=== Housing ===
Of the 21,479 houses in Gap in 2011, 88% were principal residences (against 89.20% of 19,043 houses in 2006), and 8.50% were vacant (compared with 7% of the 19,043 in 2006). Two-thirds of them are apartments (almost 65%). A majority of these houses consist of 4 rooms (30%) or 5 rooms (28%). Overall, the buildings date from the period between 1946 and 1990 (65%). Half of the inhabitants of principal residences are owners (51%), the share of social rental housing (HLM) represents only 15%.

=== Amenity projects ===
- A ring road, now called boulevard urbain [urban boulevard]
- The Bernard-Givaudan park and garden
- Renovation of the Rue Jean Eymard [Jean Eymard Road]
- Renovation of the Carré de l'Imprimerie [Printing House Square] in the town centre with a number of facilities (housing, commercial space, underground parking, medical home, etc.)

== Politics and administration ==
=== Political trends and outcomes ===
The outgoing mayor, Roger Didier, was a representative in the municipal elections of 2014 and was re-elected at the end of the second round with 53.37% of votes. The turnout was 57.41%.

=== Municipal administration ===
The City Council consists of 43 members, including 20 who are elected by the community council.

Composition of the municipal Council (2014-2020 term)
| Party | List | Chaired by | Seats | Status |
|---|---|---|---|---|
| DVG | Gap @venir 2014 [Gap @future 2014] | Bernard Jaussaud | 6 (3) | opposition |
| FG | Tous capables G.A.U.C.H.E. [All capable G.A.U.C.H.E.] | Jean-Claude Eyraud | 2 (1) | opposition |
| DVG | Bien Vivre A Gap [Living Well In Gap] | Guy Blanc | 1 | opposition |
| DVD | Gap Devant [Gap Forward] | Roger Didier | 34 (16) | majority |

=== List of mayors ===
List of successive mayors since the Liberation
| Start | End | Name | Party | Other details |
|---|---|---|---|---|
| 1944 | 1947 | Robert Bidault | | |
| 1947 | 1971 | Émile Didier | Radical Party | MP and Senator of Hautes-Alpes |
| March 1971 | March 1989 | Bernard Givaudan | DVD | |
| March 1989 | February 2007 | Pierre Bernard-Reymond | UDF-CDS then UMP | Regional Councillor Provence-Alpes-Côte d'Azur, Senator |
| February 2007 | In progress | Roger Didier (Note: Former 1st Deputy and member of the left-wing majority to the general council of Hautes-Alpes, Roger Didier was elected Mayor following the resignation of Pierre Bernard-Reymond (UMP) who became Senator on 26 January 2007. Due to the Act on the accumulation of mandates, he preferred to keep his mandate to advise the regional council of Provence-Alpes-Côte d'Azur. Source: "Sarkozy aux Allemands: "vous êtes un modèle, on va faire tout comme vous!"" [Sarkozy to the Germans: "You are a model, we'll do just like you!"] (in French). Archived from the original on 23 November 2008.) | PRG then DVD then UDI | General Counsel of Hautes-Alpes (Canton of Gap-Centre) |

List of successive mayors before the Liberation
| Start | End | Name | Party | Other details |
|---|---|---|---|---|
| 1816 | Before 1830 | Jean Joseph Amat | | |
| ... | | | | |
| 1871 | 1878 | Pierre Jules Tanc | | |
| 1878 | 1896 | Frédéric Euzière | | Lawyer, MP of Haute-Alpes |
| 1896 | 1900 | Auguste Tourres | | |
| 1900 | 1904 | Joseph Faure | | |
| 1904 | 1906 | Albert Martin | | |
| 1906 | 1908 | Férréol Jean | | |
| 1908 | 1919 | Paul Caillat | | Banker |
| 1919 | 1924 | Louis Berne | | |
| 1924 | 1925 | Adrien Fabre | | |
| 1925 | 1927 | Jean Eymar | | |
| 1927 | 1928 | Victor Provensal | | |
| 1928 | 1929 | Paul Serres | | |
| 19 May 1925 | 25 November 1940 | Auguste Muret | SFIO | Printer, General Counsel of Barcelonnette, MP |

=== Intercommunality ===
Since 1 January 2017, Gap is part of the Communauté d'agglomération Gap-Tallard-Durance, covering 17 municipalities.

=== Administrative divisions ===
Until the departmental elections of March 2015, Gap was divided into six cantons: Gap-Campagne (including five communes: La Freissinouse, Manteyer, Pelleautier, Rabou and La Roche-des-Arnauds), Gap-Centre, Gap-Nord-Est, Gap-Nord-Ouest, Gap-Sud-Est and Gap-Sud-Ouest.

Since the redistribution of the cantons of the Hautes-Alpes Department, Gap is divided into four cantons.

=== Judicial and administrative proceedings ===
Gap has the presence of a high court.

=== Environmental policy ===
Gap is classified as three flowers in the competition of flowery cities and villages.

=== International relations ===
A map of Europe with Gap and its twin towns highlighted

==== Twinning ====
Gap is twinned with a couple of European cities. It is in this framework that socio-cultural, educational and sports exchanges are made.

- Pinerolo, Italy, since 1966
- Traunstein, Germany, since 1976

==== Decentralised cooperation ====
In addition, decentralised cooperation agreements have been signed with a couple of cities in Africa and Asia.

- Bangou, Cameroon, since 2003
- Kathmandu, Nepal, since 2004

== Population and society ==
=== Demographics ===
==== Demographic change ====
Populations of the area corresponding with the commune of Gap at 1 January 2025, including the former communes Chaudun (absorbed in 1895) and Romette (absorbed in 1974).

Historical population

| Year | Pop. | ±% p.a. |
|---|---|---|
| 1793 | 6,560 | — |
| 1800 | 8,524 | +3.81% |
| 1806 | 9,474 | +1.78% |
| 1821 | 7,255 | −1.76% |
| 1831 | 7,867 | +0.81% |
| 1836 | 8,462 | +1.47% |
| 1841 | 9,238 | +1.77% |
| 1846 | 9,378 | +0.30% |
| 1851 | 9,411 | +0.07% |
| 1856 | 9,507 | +0.20% |
| 1861 | 8,793 | −1.55% |
| 1866 | 8,819 | +0.06% |
| 1872 | 9,494 | +1.24% |

| Year | Pop. | ±% p.a. |
|---|---|---|
| 1876 | 9,889 | +1.02% |
| 1881 | 11,438 | +2.95% |
| 1886 | 12,277 | +1.43% |
| 1891 | 11,099 | −2.00% |
| 1896 | 11,903 | +1.41% |
| 1901 | 11,530 | −0.63% |
| 1906 | 11,271 | −0.45% |
| 1911 | 11,094 | −0.32% |
| 1921 | 10,274 | −0.76% |
| 1926 | 11,051 | +1.47% |
| 1931 | 12,158 | +1.93% |
| 1936 | 14,040 | +2.92% |
| 1946 | 16,760 | +1.79% |

| Year | Pop. | ±% p.a. |
|---|---|---|
| 1954 | 17,787 | +0.75% |
| 1962 | 20,963 | +2.07% |
| 1968 | 24,571 | +2.68% |
| 1975 | 28,233 | +2.00% |
| 1982 | 30,676 | +1.19% |
| 1990 | 33,444 | +1.09% |
| 1999 | 36,262 | +0.90% |
| 2007 | 37,785 | +0.52% |
| 2012 | 40,761 | +1.53% |
| 2017 | 40,895 | +0.07% |
| 2023 | 41,293 | +0.16% |

From 1962 to 1999: population without double counting; for the following dates: municipal population.
Source: LdH/EHESS/Cassini until 1999 then INSEE from 2007.

==== Age structure ====
The distribution of age groups in the commune of Gap is shown below, in comparison with the Hautes-Alpes department.

Population by age of Gap, 2023 (%)

| 80+ | 8.4 |
| 65–79 | 17.8 |
| 55–64 | 13.2 |
| 40–54 | 18.4 |
| 25–39 | 16.2 |
| 15–24 | 10.8 |
| 0–14 | 15.2 |

Total: 100

| male |

| female |

Source: INSEE

Population by age of Hautes-Alpes, 2023 (%)

| 90+ | 7.7 |
| 75–89 | 18.7 |
| 60–74 | 14.6 |
| 45–59 | 19.4 |
| 30–44 | 15.7 |
| 15–29 | 8.8 |
| 0–14 | 15.3 |

Total: 100.2

| male |

| female |

Source: INSEE

=== Education ===
Gap is situated in the Académie d'Aix-Marseille.

==== Schools ====
The city administers 12 nursery schools, 13 elementary schools and 6 rural schools. There are also several private kindergartens and elementary schools.

The Department manages five collèges and four lycées of the Provence-Alpes-Côte d'Azur region, the Lycée professionnel Paul-Hariharan, the school of general and farm technology education "Les Emeyères", the Dominique-Villars Lycée and the Aristide-Briand Lycée.

There are also two private schools, the Lycée professionnel Sévigné and Lycée Saint-Joseph. That said, the Lycée professionnel Sévigné is now public.

==== Higher education ====
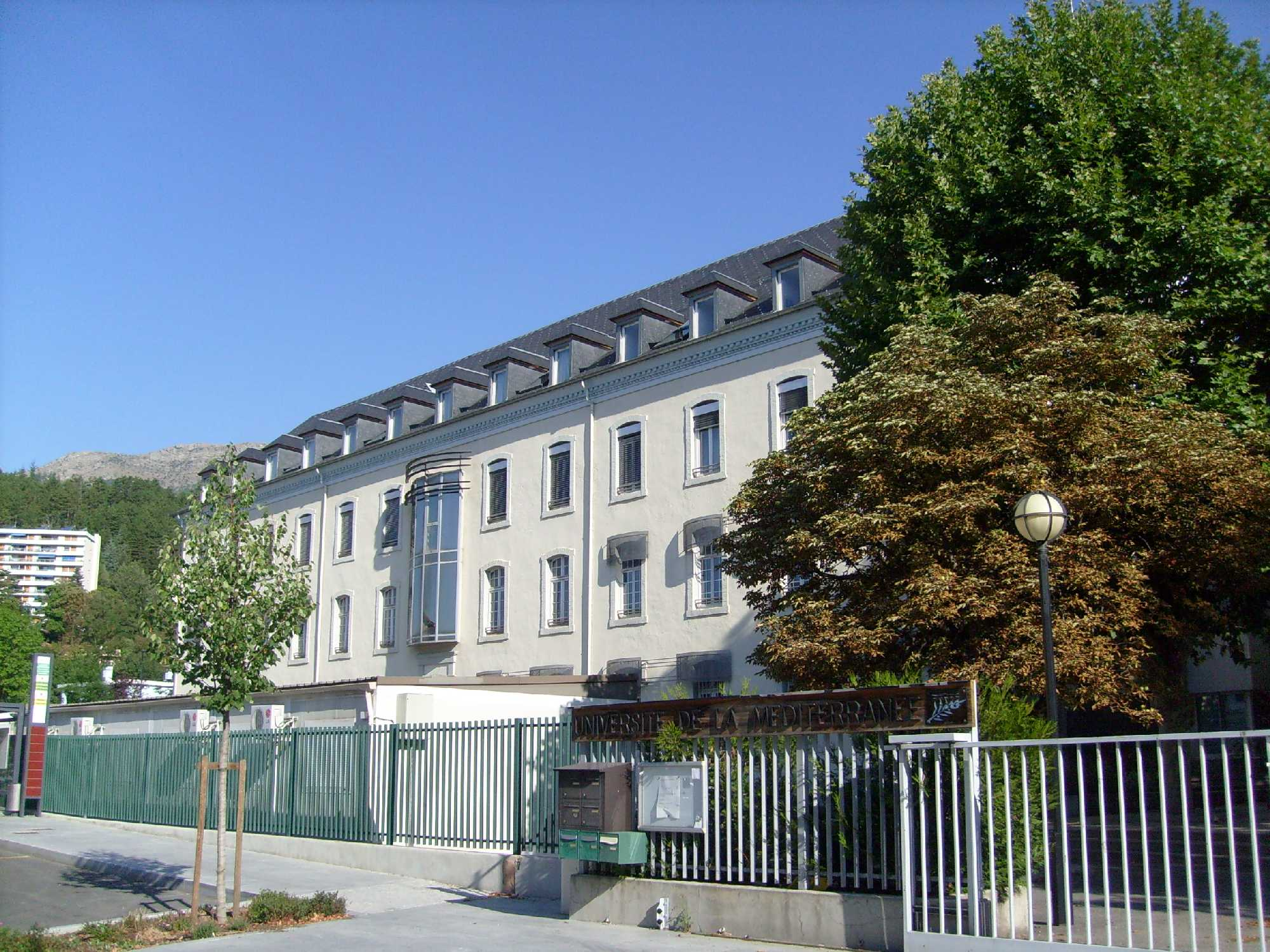
Pôle University in Gap

Higher education in Gap is represented by the Pôle University of Gap, an annex of the former University of the Mediterranean Aix-Marseille II, today the Aix-Marseille University, created from the merger of three universities. It includes a STAPS centre, a Business Administration and Management IUT (GEA), a "Mountain crafts" IUP (professional master) which is unique in France, as well as being able to give an aircraft maintenance licence (Provence-Alpes-Côte d'Azur region is a Competitive Centre in Aeronautics, and the Department has established the Centre of Rural Excellence Excell'Air.

Several BTS chains and preparatory classes exist in the lycées, in particular a Computer Services in Organisations BTS and a Negotiations and Customer Service BTS at the Lycée Dominique Villars as well as an Assistant Manager BTS at the Lycée Aristide Briand.

=== Cultural events and festivities ===
During the summer months, the association of merchants of the town centre Les Vitrines de Gap organises Nocturnes. These are musical and festive events accompanied by the opening of stores downtown from 7pm until 11pm. Each year an Expo Fair also takes place at the Parc de la Pépinnière during May.

The Quattro, a theatre with retractable tiered seating, organises all kinds of events, namely concerts, performances, business seminars, etc.

Gap is home to the European University of Saxophone, a classical saxophone summer school and festival held annually.

=== Health ===
The city has a hospital, the Centre Hospitalier Intercommunal of Alpes du Sud (CHICAS) which is divided into three entities. The first and most important site is Gap, which is the largest hospital of the Southern Alps. Gap is also equipped with a site specialising in geriatrics. As a result of a merger, the CHICAS manages the site of Sisteron. The Polyclinic of the Southern Alps is the only clinic present in the city and other centres of rehabilitation.

There is also a Maison Médicale du Gapençais with extended opening hours.

=== Sports ===
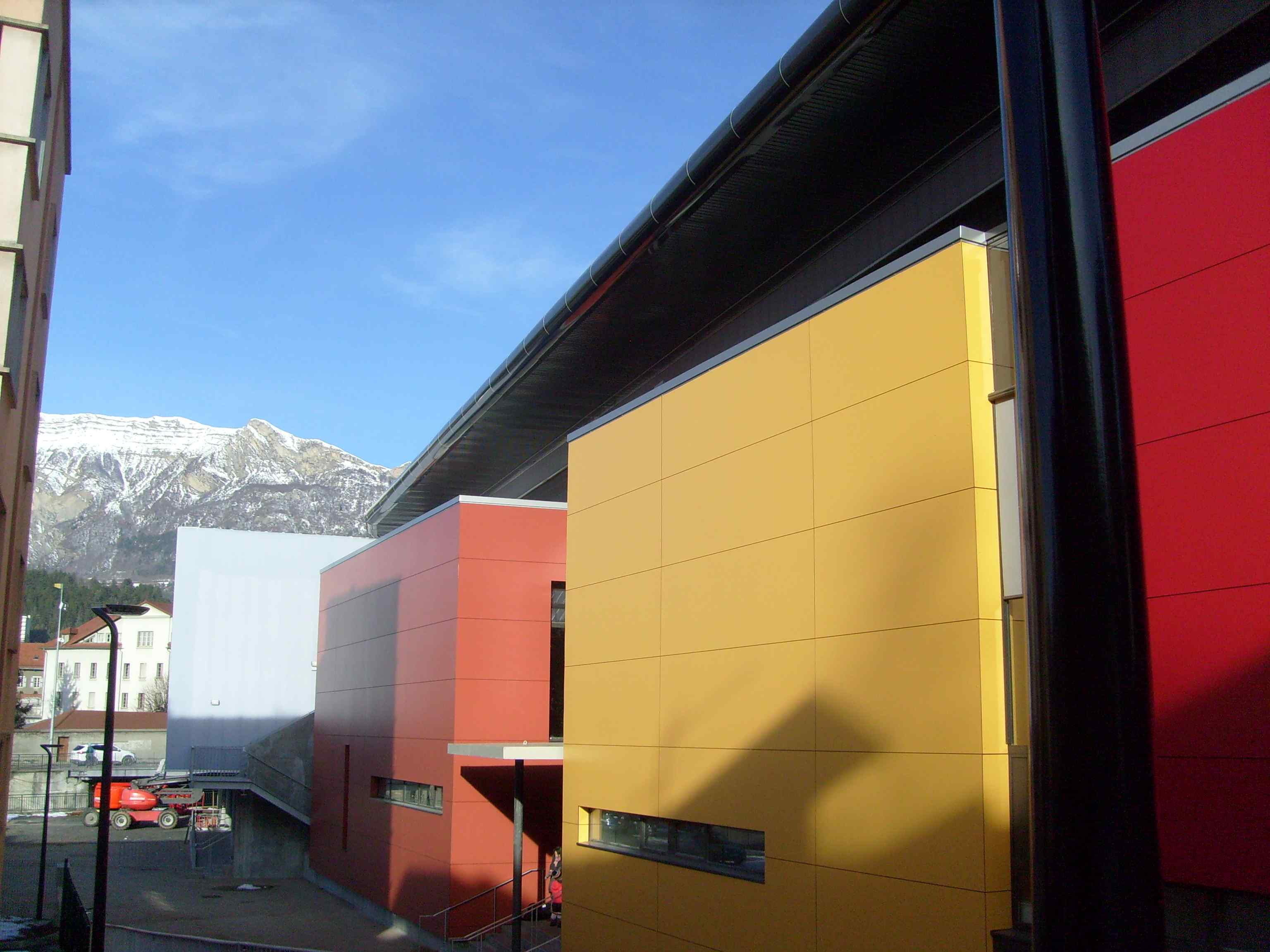
The Patinoire Brown-Ferrand (ice rink) in Gap

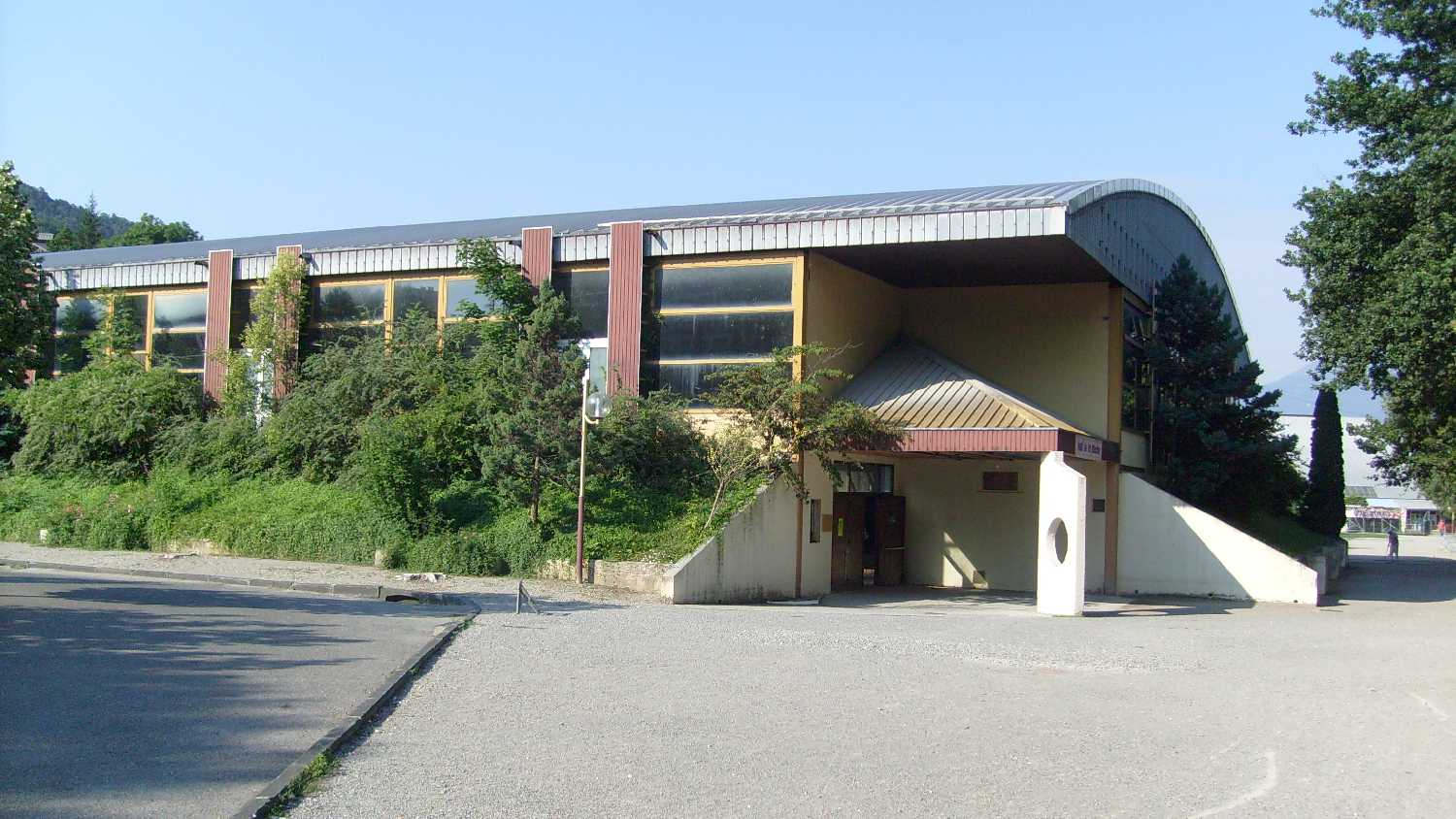
Multipurpose hall of La Blâche

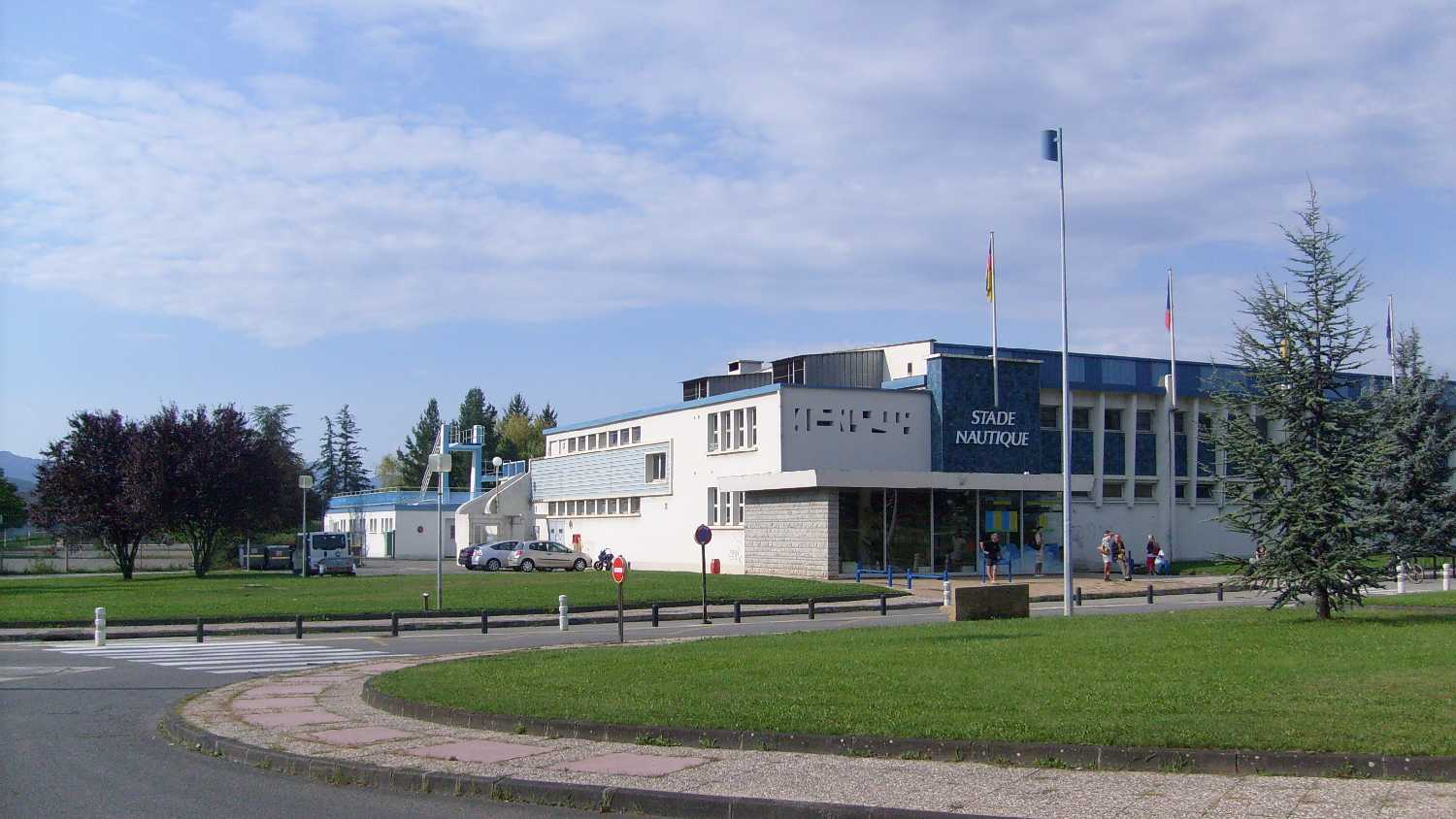
The swimming arena

Clubs:

- Ice hockey club, the Rapaces de Gap [Gap Raptors], which plays in Ligue Magnus and has more than 30 titles of champion of France in all categories.
- The Gap FC football team, which plays in the 1st division of the Alps District.
- The athletic club, the Gap Hautes-Alpes athletics (GH2A).
- Cross-country ski club, Ski club Gap-Bayard.
- Road cycling and mountain biking club, the UCPG.
- Mountain biking club, the PJPC.
- Gap Hautes Alpes Rugby club plays in Fédérale 3.
- Gap basketball for Pre-nationale.
- Gap Handball playing in Pre-nationale.
- Gap volleyball which plays in the Regional Championship.
- The Gapencais Sasquatches, club allowing the discovery or the practice of American football.

The town of Gap regularly hosts stages of the Tour de France and the Critérium du Dauphiné in cycling, as well as the Monte Carlo Rally in motorsport.

The town of Gap is known for its mountain bike trek the Paths of the Sun, between Saillans and Gap.

The sports facilities in Gap include stadiums, gymnasiums, swimming pools, ice rink, multi-purpose room (bowling), and tennis courts.

The fitness centre Gap-Bayard, located on the Bayard plateau, has an 18-hole golf course that operates in summer and is a base for cross-country skiing in winter.

In October 2004, the association Objective JO 2018 worked for a French candidacy of the Alpes du Sud, at the 2018 Winter Olympics. The town of Gap was approached to run in the race. Gap withdrew in October 2008 and was replaced by the municipality of Pelvoux and the Communauté de communes du Pays des Écrins.

In 2009, the town of Gap won the competition of the Intervilles sports show during the final against Dax.

The town of Gap hosted the final of the Coupe de France des rallyes amateurs during the autumn of 2012.

In 2013, the town of Gap was elected the sportiest city of more of 20,000 inhabitants in France by L'Équipe newspaper.

=== Media ===
- Alpes 1 (local information radio station, leader in the Hautes-Alpes, present also in the Alpes de Haute-Provence)
- The Dauphiné Libéré (daily)
- Alpes et Midi (weekly)
- Anima Gap
- D!CI

=== Religion ===
==== Catholic ====
===== Cathedral and churches =====
- The Cathedral of Notre-Dame and Saint-Arnoux, built in the 19th century according to the plans of Charles Laisné.
- The Church of Saint-André-les-Cordeliers, rebuilt in the 18th century and used to worship according to the extraordinary rite of the Catholic Church.
- The Church of Saint-Roch, built in the 20th century.
- The Church our Lady of Hope, built in the 20th century.
- St. Peter's Church

===== Chapels =====
- The Chapel of Saint-Grégoire in the hamlet of Les Fareaux
- The Chapel of Saint-Louis, district of Charance
- The Chapel of Saint-Pierre, hamlet of Treschatel
- The Chapel of Saint-Jacques-le-Mineur, district of La Tourronde

==== Protestant ====
- The Evangelical Church, Assembly of God of Gap
- The Protestant Evangelical Church Le Rocher (CAEF)
- The Protestant Temple, dependent of the Reformed Church of France
- The Adventist Church

==== Millenarian Christian ====
- Jehovah's witnesses
- Church of Jesus Christ of latter-day saints

==== Muslim ====
- The Al Salam Mosque, inaugurated on 7 July 2013

== Economy ==
=== Revenues of the population and taxation ===
==== Revenues ====
The median pay in Gap in 2011 is 18,944 euros. The majority of revenues are derived from wage work (55%), compared to a third of retirees (30%).

==== Taxation ====
In 2011, 18,345 households existed in Gap, 60% of them were taxable.

The taxation of households and businesses to Gap in 2010
| Tax | Communal | Intercommunal | Departmental | Regional |
|---|---|---|---|---|
| Housing Tax (TH) | 12.44% | 0.00% | 6.05% | 0.00% |
| Land tax on the built-up properties (TFPB) | 35.58% | 0.00% | 16.33% | 2.36% |
| Land tax on the non-built-up properties (TFPNB) | 123.32% | 0.00% | 85.50% | 8.85% |
| Business tax (TP) | 28.25%* | 0.00% | 0.00% | 0.00% |

=== Industry ===
The construction sector (French: Bâtiment et travaux publics (BTP)) has grown through the inclusion of winter sports.

=== Tertiary sector ===
The tertiary sector is the sector which dominates the local economy:

- Garrison town (4th Mountain Infantry Battalion and Base de Défense since January 2011) and administrative (prefecture, department hall)
- Tourism

Gap is the seat of the Chamber of commerce and industry of the Hautes-Alpes. It manages the centre for regional and European tourism (CRET) of Briançon, the ADAPEI of Gap and the Centre Européen Médical Bioclimatique de Recherche et d'Enseignement Universitaire [European medical bioclimatic research and university teaching Center] (CEMBREU) of Briançon.

=== Bitcoin ===
In December 2024, the first real estate transaction using Bitcoin in France was completed, involving the purchase of two parking spaces in Gap for 0.33 Bitcoin. The transaction was facilitated by the Bitcoinimmo project, which leverages blockchain technology and was validated by a notary with support from the Caisse des Dépôts et Consignations. This event marks a notable milestone in cryptocurrency adoption within the French real estate market, potentially paving the way for future digital currency property transactions.

== Local culture and heritage ==
=== Places and monuments ===
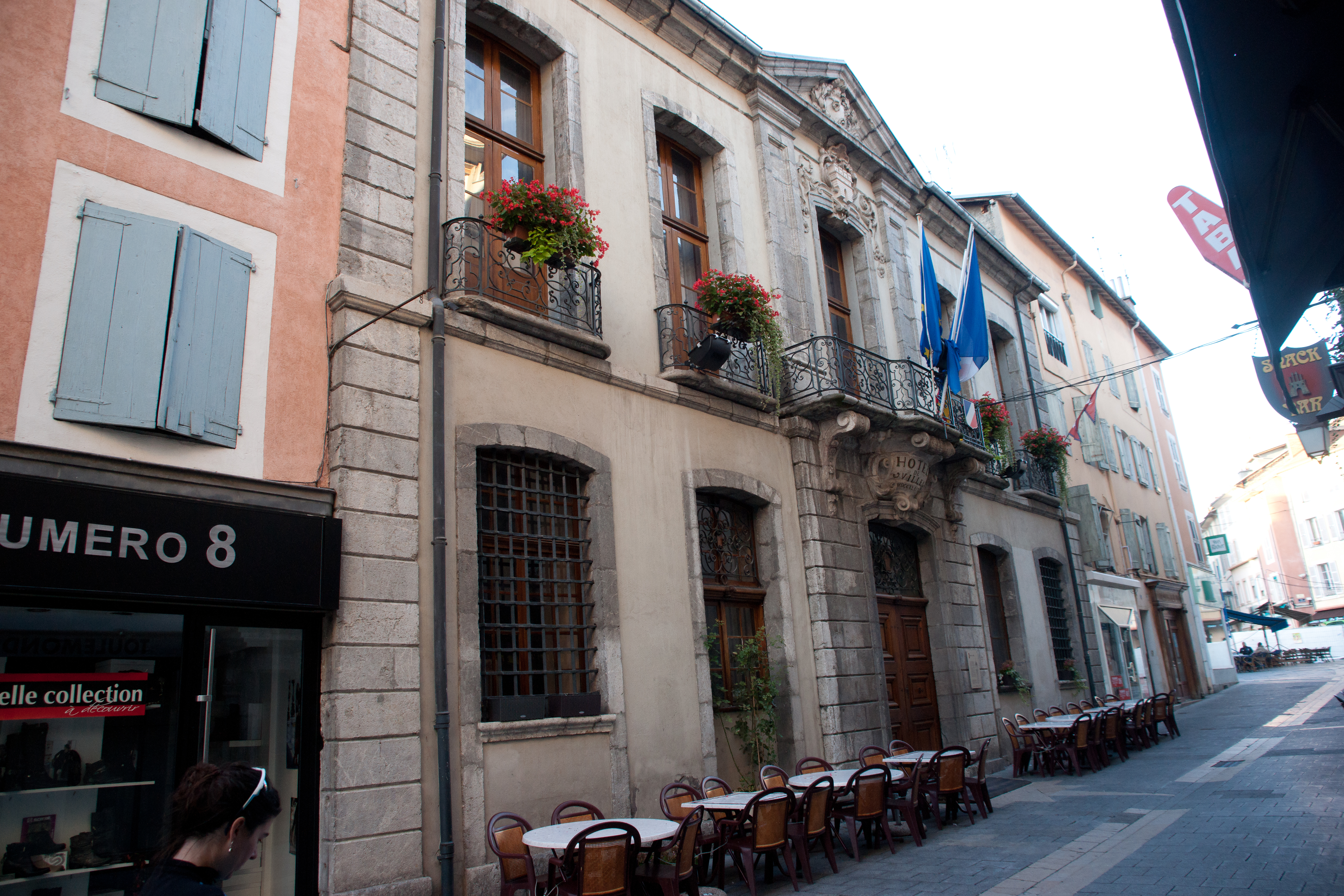
The Hôtel de Ville

- The Departemental Museum of the Hautes-Alpes houses the mausoleum of François de Bonne (Duke of Lesdiguières, Constable of the Haut-Alpin) carved in the black marble of the Champsaur by Jacob Richier.
- The pedestrian centre made of small passages and pleasant terraces revolves around place Jean-Marcellin.
- Bronze by Cyril de La Patellière, "The Light", by order of Mayor Pierre Bernard-Reymond in 2006.
- The Parc de la Pépinière
- The clock tower
- The Hôtel de Ville which was completed in 1743.
- The *Church of Saint André les Cordeliers
- The Cathedral of Notre-Dame and Saint-Arnoux was built from 1866 to 1904 according to the plans of Charles Laisné. This Neo-Gothic building replaces a medieval construction.
- The Conservatoire botanique national alpin de Gap-Charance, situated north-west of Gap
Places around Gap

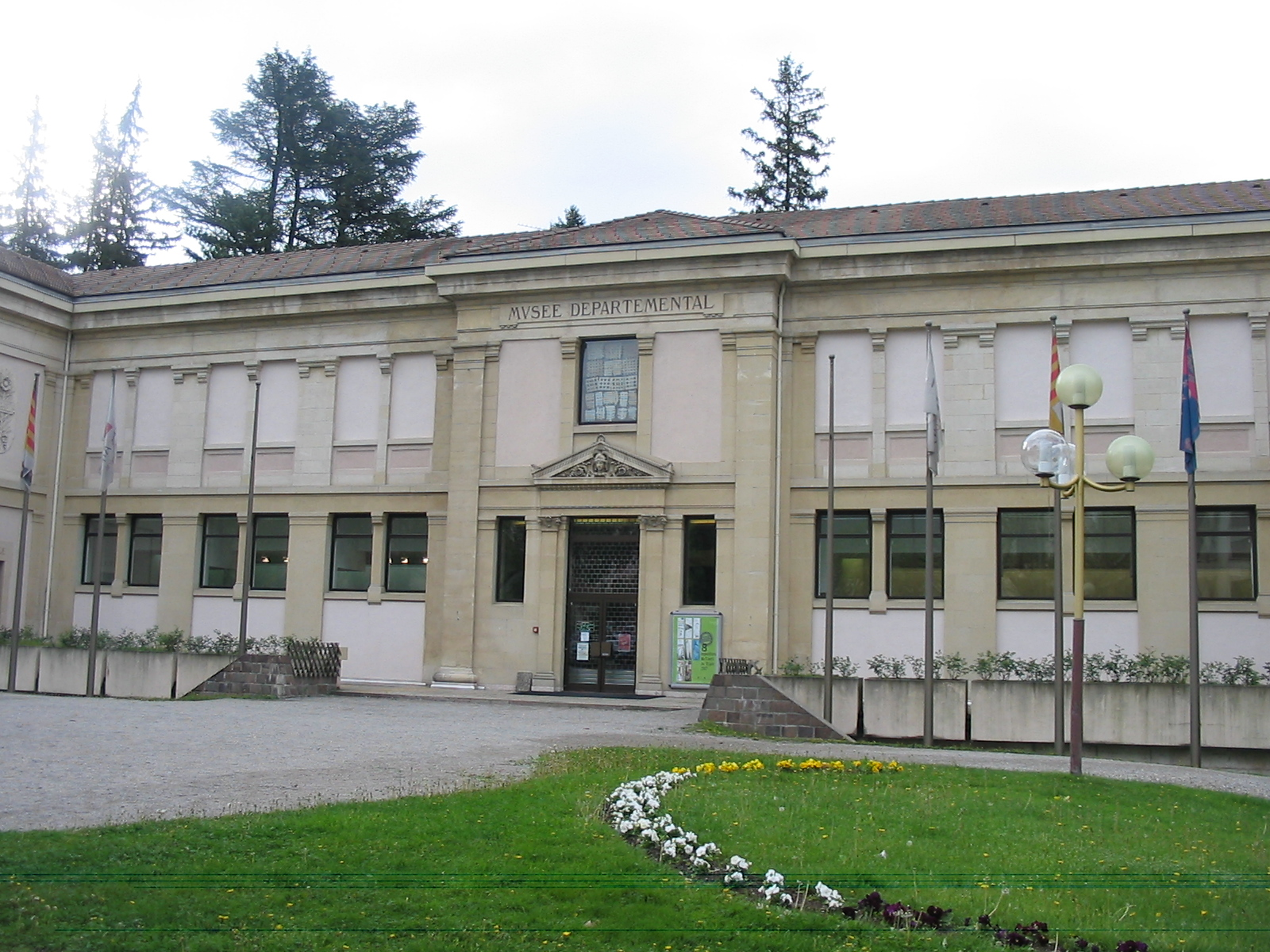
The Departemental Museum of Gap

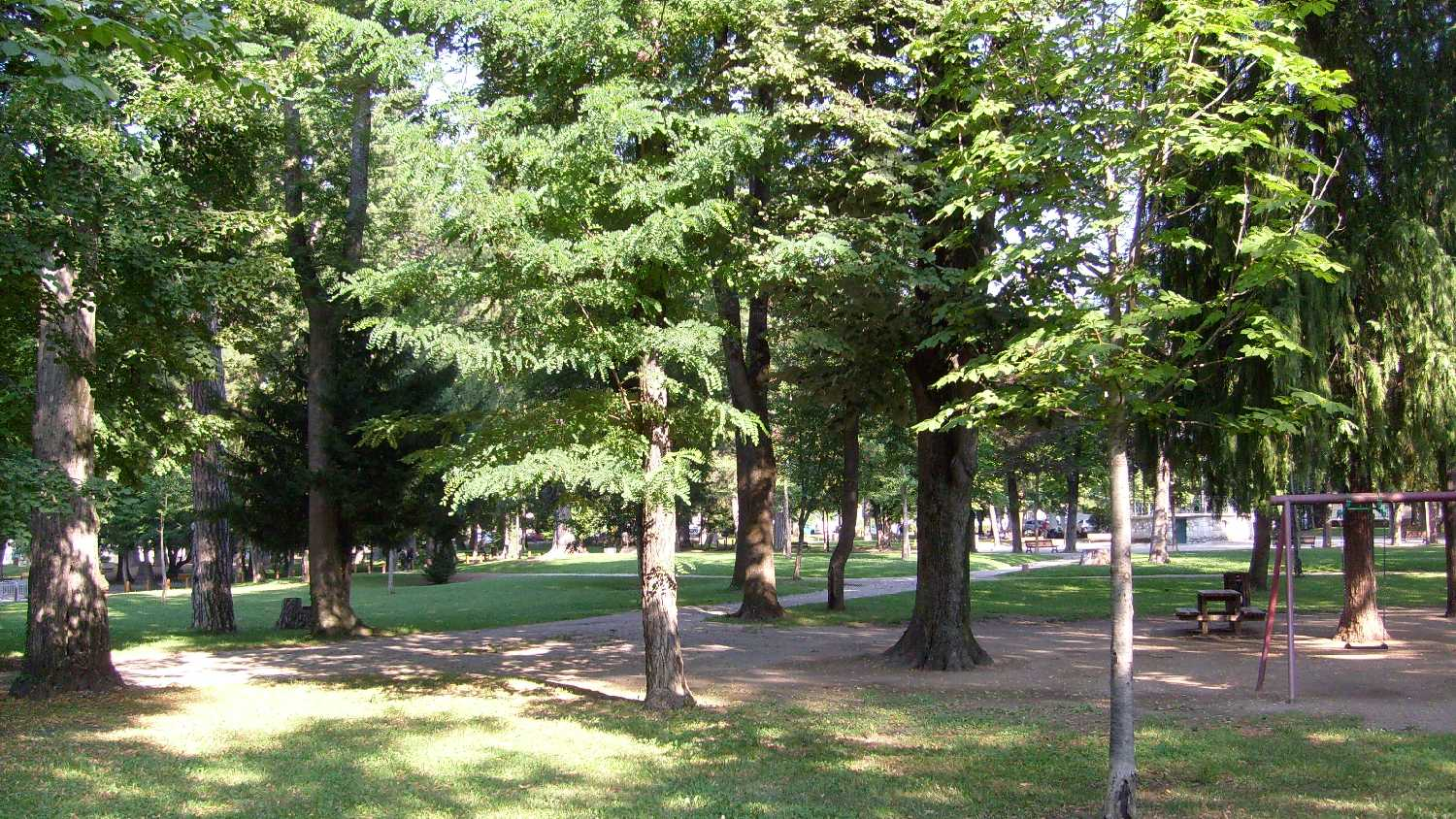
Parc de la Pépinière

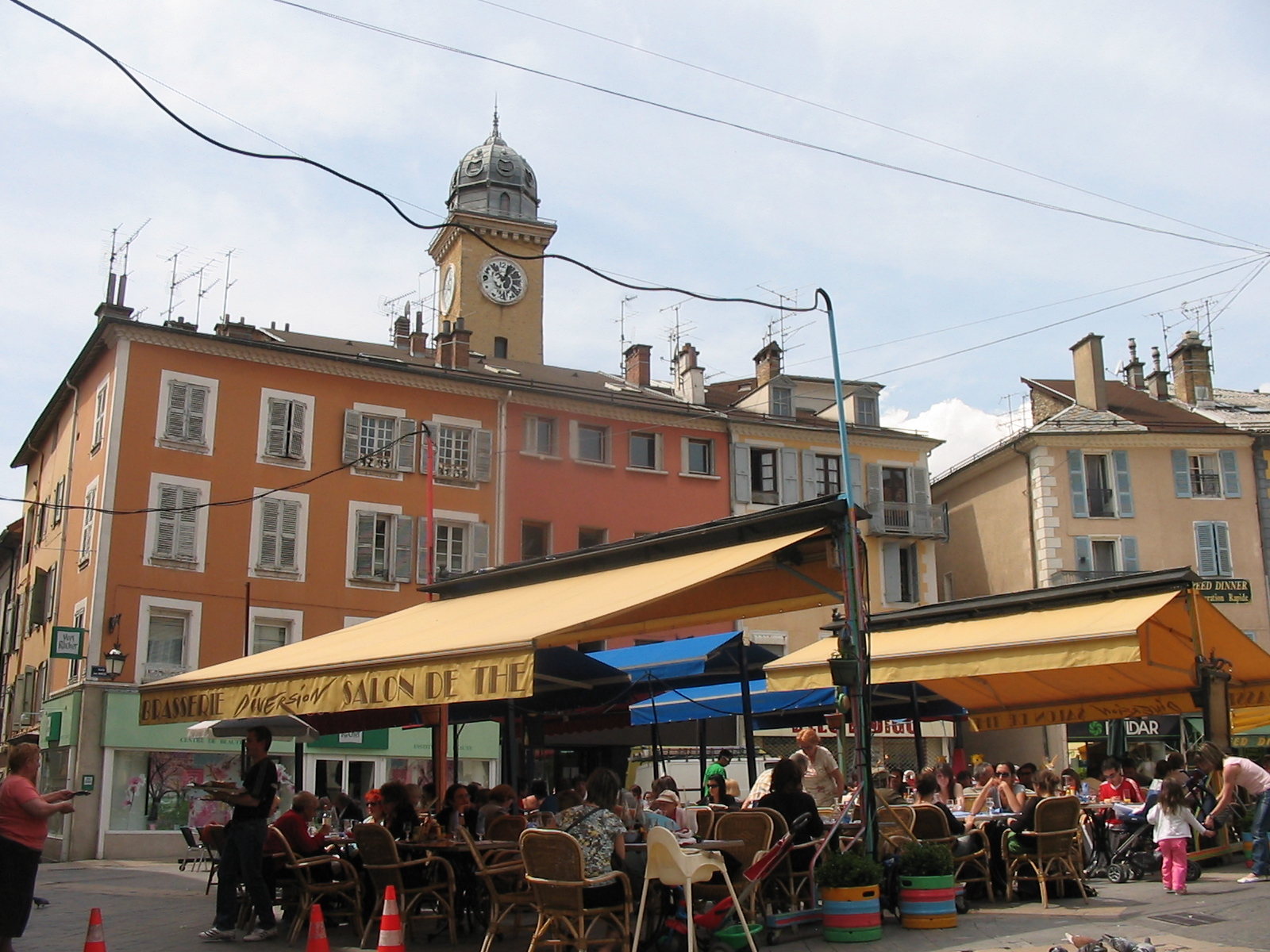
Place Jean-Marcellin

==== The Charance Estate ====
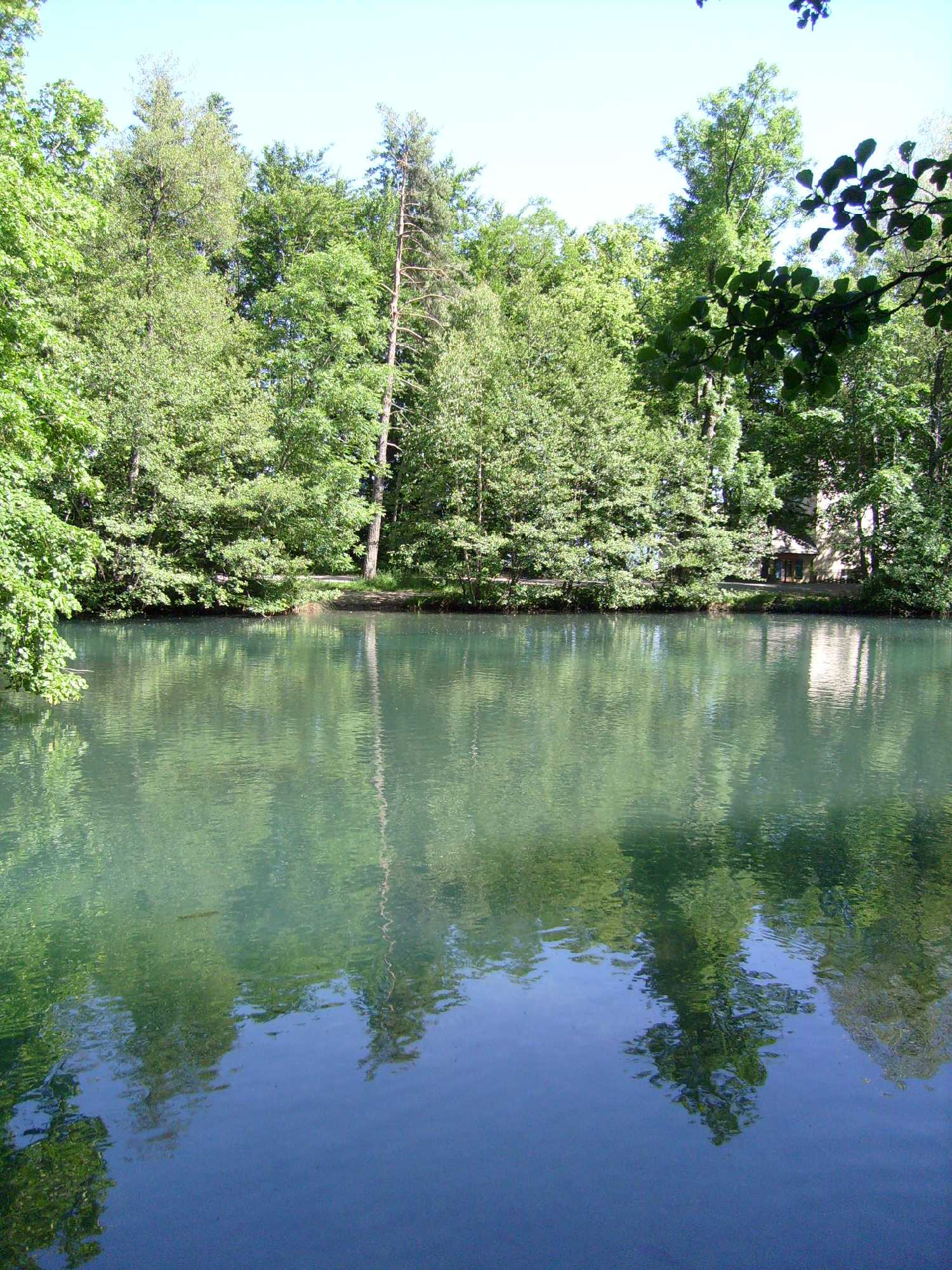
The Charance Lake

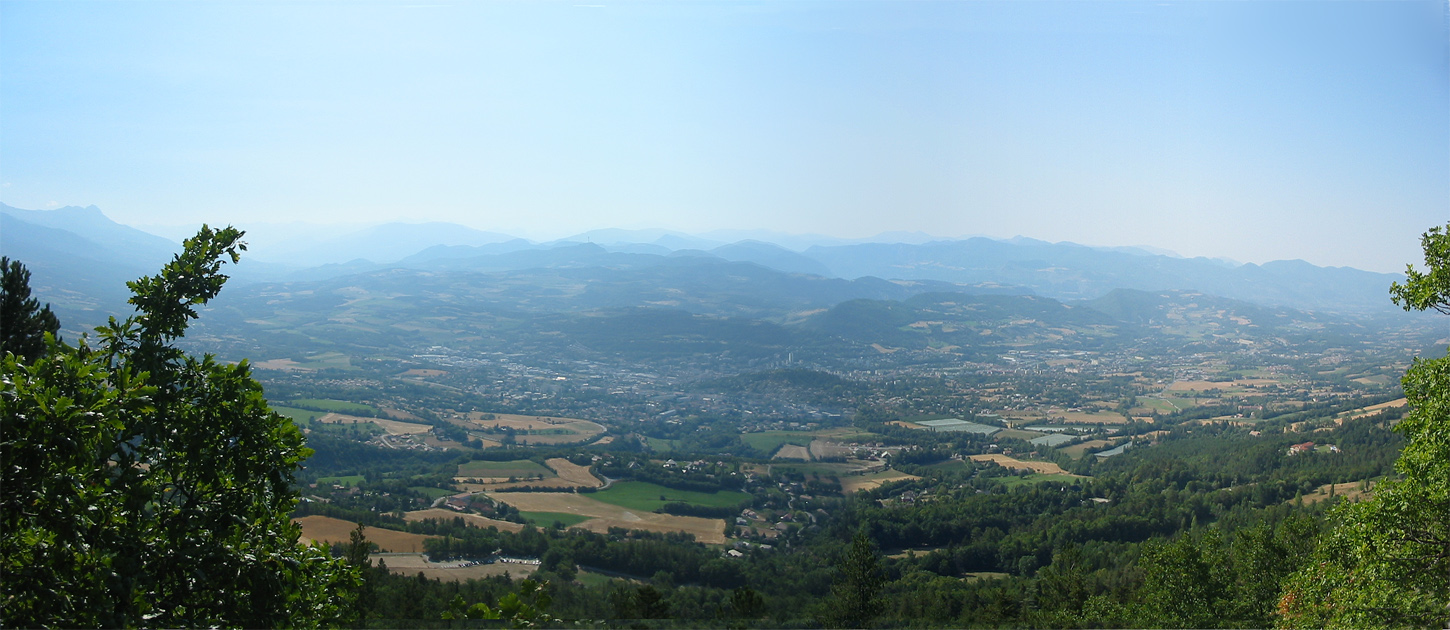
The city of Gap seen from Charance

The Château de Charance was built in the 16th century. It includes a main building, which today is the headquarters of the Écrins National Park, and several annexes, one of which houses the Park Museum.

The Charance Estate also features the Conservatoire botanique national alpin [Alpine National Botanical Conservatory], a terraced garden and an area of 220 hectares (540 acres) around the château and in the middle of which lies a small lake: Charance Lake. All overlooks the city.

See also: Domaine de Charance

=== Cultural heritage ===
- The theatre of La Passerelle, Scène nationale [national stage] of the Southern Alps.
- The Quattro, a versatile new cultural space initially called the "Cube", inaugurated on 27 May 2008
- The Conservatoire, of departmental influence
- The Municipal Centre of Culture and Leisure (CMCL)
- The municipal library
- The international Folkdance festival, which takes place every year in July
- 3 cinemas exist in Gap (of which two have been saved by the city hall, when the building housing their screens was sold)

=== Military life ===
Military units have been stationed at Gap:

- 17th infantry regiment, before 1914
- 96th infantry regiment, 1906
- 7th Demi-brigade of Mountain Infantry, 1939–1940, consisting of:
  - 6th Mountain Infantry Battalion
  - 15th Mountain Infantry Battalion
  - 23rd Mountain Infantry Battalion

4th Mountain Infantry Battalion (4th Rch) since 1983.

== Notable people ==
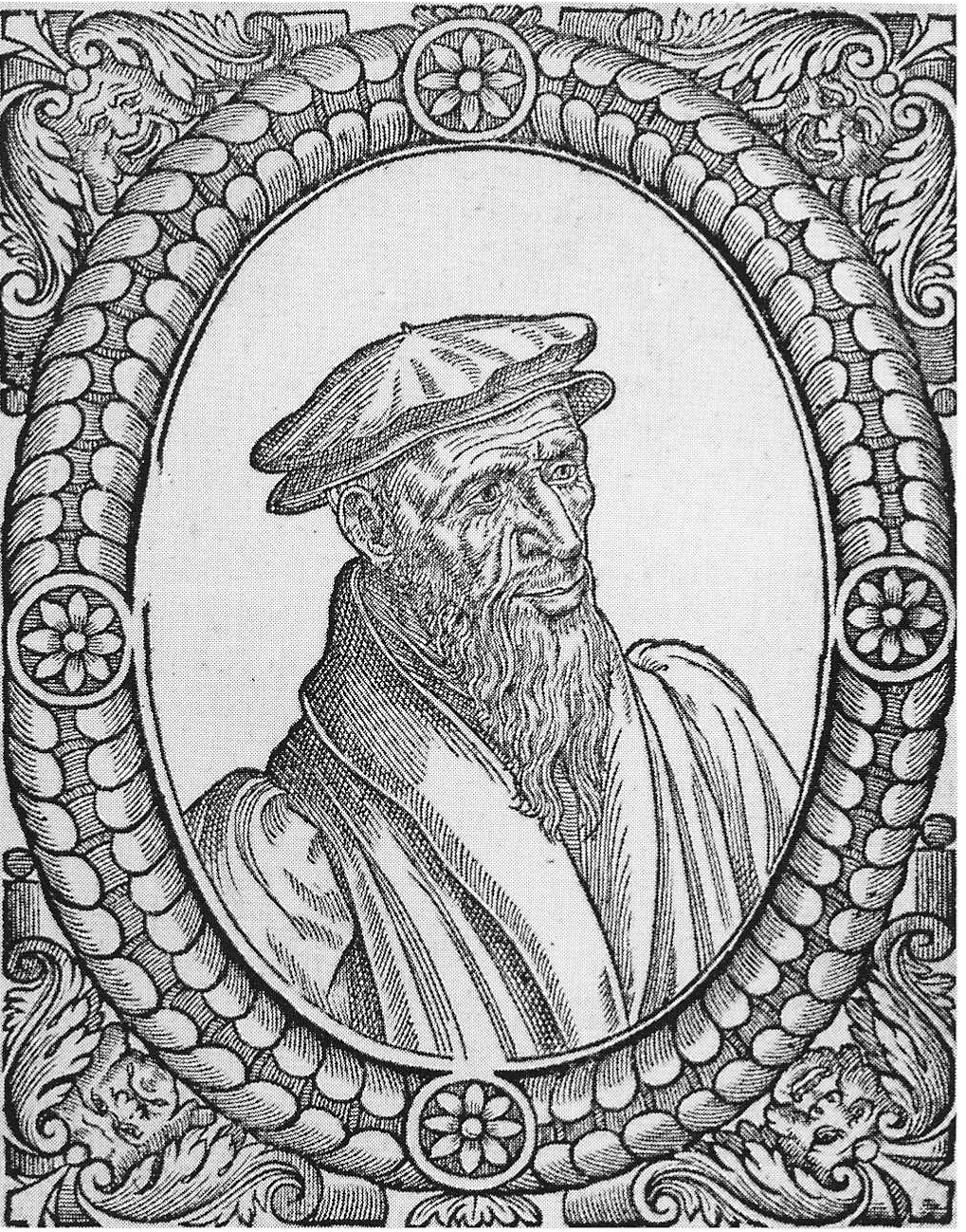
Guillaume Farel

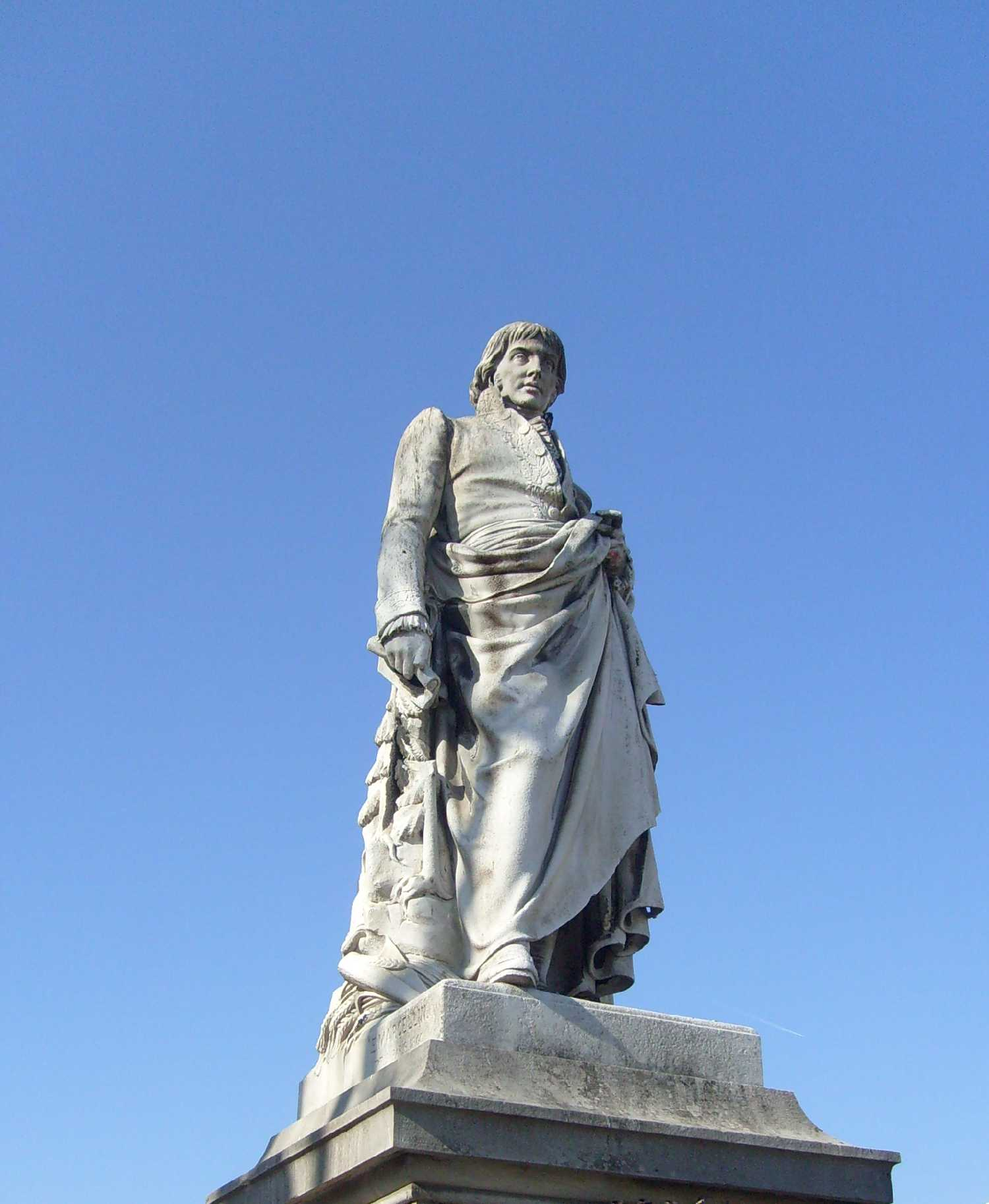
Statue of Ladoucette in Gap made by the Gap sculptor, Jean Marcellin

Below is a non-exhaustive list of people born in Gap or having a particular attachment to the city:

- Féraud de Nice (c. 970 - 1044) - Bishop of Gap at the beginning of the 11th century.
- Albertet of Sisteron (1194-1221) - native troubadour of the town.
- Guillaume Farel (1489-1565) - Protestant reformer, he participated in the expansion of the Protestant Reformation in French-speaking Switzerland and was a translator of the Bible to French and Occitan.
- Honorat Rambaud (1516-1586) - Marseille grammarian, born in Gap.
- Honoré Pellé or Honoré Pela (1641-1718) - baroque sculptor, pupil of Pierre Puget, his career took place mainly in Genoa.
- Jean-Michel Rolland (1745-1810) - parish priest of Le Caire in 1789, Deputy to the Estates-General of 1789 and the constituent Assembly (1789-1791).
- Dominique Villars (1745-1814) - botanist, he is the author of several manuscripts of Histoire des plantes du Dauphiné resulting from over twenty years of observations of plants.
- Jean Labastie (1754-1821) - born in Gap, former National Assembly member for Hautes-Alpes
- Joseph Provensal de Lompré (1760-1833) – died in Gap, former National Assembly member for Hautes-Alpes and imperial attorney
- Baron Charles-François de Ladoucette (1772-1848) - prefect of Hautes-Alpes under Napoleon. He founded the Société d'émulation des Hautes-Alpes [Society of Emulation of Haute-Alpes] (now the Society for the Study of the Hautes-Alpes) and Gap Museum.
- Honoré Bucelle (1762-1844), died in Gap, from 1820 to 1827 National Assembly member for Hautes-Alpes.
- Joseph-Bruno Guigues (1805-1874) - first bishop of Ottawa.
- Paul Colomb de Batines (1811–1855), Librarian and bibliographer
- Jean Marcellin (1821-1884) - sculptor, pupil of François Rude. Gap owes him for the Baron of Ladoucette statue at the end of the course Ladoucette.
- Jules-Henri-Marius Bergeret was born in Gap (Hautes-Alpes) in 1830 and died in New York (United States) in 1905, was a personality of the Paris Commune.
- Auguste Burle (1834-1889) and Emile Burle (1835-1875) were botanists, specialists of the flora in the vicinity of Gap, they donated their Herbarium at the Botanical Society of Lyon.
- Joseph Roman (1850-1924) - Director of the Archives of Hautes-Alpes, and as historian, he published several brochures on cities, villages and the families of his departement.
- Hippolyte Müller (1865-1933) - originally an apprentice jeweller, a self-taught archaeologist, he was the founder of the Musée dauphinois at Grenoble.
- Georges de Manteyer (1867-1948) - historian, Chief Archivist of the Hautes-Alpes, his bust was erected in the Parc de la Pépinière, in the centre of Gap.
- Louise Germain (1874-1939) - painter who often worked alongside Paul Cézanne.
- Achille Mauzan (1883-1952) - artist from Gaumont cinema at the beginning of the 20th century. He was also a painter and sculptor and was part of the Art Deco art movement.
- André Allix (1889-1966) - geographer, former Rector of the University of Lyon and former Director of the Revue de Géographie de Lyon.
- Jean Michard-Pellissier (1909-1976) - born in Gap, politician.
- Robert Thomas (1927-1989) - born in Gap, playwright, director and producer.
- Jacques Bolognesi (1947-) - born in Gap, composer.
- Henri Bréchu (1947-) - born in Gap, skier.
- Francis Masse (1948-) - born in Gap, screenwriter and comic illustrator.
- Marie-Anne Chazel (1951-) - born in Gap, actress, Member of Le Splendid.
- Raymond Durand (1952-) - born in Gap, rally driver, champion of the world FIA Alternative Energies Cup in 2009 and 2010.
- Chantal Lauby (1953-) - born in Gap, comedian, film director, actress, Member of Les Nuls.
- Michel Crespin (1955-2001) - born in Gap, French cartoonist.
- Christian Audigier (1958-), designer
- Jean-Christophe Lafaille (1965-2006)-born in Gap, mountaineer.
- Fabienne Berthaud (1966–), writer, actress and director, was born in Gap
- Christian Pouget (1966-) - born in Gap, hockey player.
- Gilles Grimandi (1970-) - born in Gap, footballer.
- Rébecca Dautremer (1971-) - born in Gap, graphic designer, illustrator and author of children's books.
- Laurence Manfredi (1974-) - born in Gap, athlete.
- Julien Blanc-Gras (1976-) - born in Gap, journalist and writer.
- Camille Combal (1981-) - born in Gap, comedian, radio and television host.
- Sébastien Ogier (1983-) - born in Gap, rally driver, record-equalling nine time World Rally Champion.
- Laëtitia Roux (1985-) - born in Gap, specialist ski mountaineer and trail.
- Stéphane Tempier (1986-) - born in Gap, competed in the 2012 Olympics in mountain biking.

== Heraldry ==
| Arms of Gap | The arms of Gap are blazoned : Azure, a castle of or with sable crenellated masonry, with an amount of four towers of the same, covered point. |

== See also ==
- Gapençais
- Canal de Gap
- List of Bishops of Gap

== Bibliography ==
- Gautier, Théodore (1844). Précis de l'histoire de la ville de Gap [Handbook of the history of the town of Gap] (in French). Afred L'Allier, printer-bookseller.
- Duchamblo, Richard (1994). Histoires de notre ville: Gap, ses rues, ses hommes [Histories of our city: Gap, its streets, its men] (in French). Gap: Librairie des Hautes-Alpes.
  History and anecdotes about the town of Gap
- Duchamblo, Richard (1994). La libération de Gap [The liberation of Gap] (in French). Gap: Louis-Jean.
  Booklet on the release of Gap in August 1944
