= Paul Colomb de Batines =

- Born: 14 November 1811; Gap
- Died: 14 January 1855 (aged 43); Florence
- Occupations: Librarian; Bibliographer

Paul Colomb de Batines (14 November 1811 – 14 January 1855) was a 19th-century French bibliographer, librarian and bibliophile. His name remains attached to his great work, a Bibliografia dantesca, "scholarship treasure" (Paolo Trovato, Un falso visconte, due edizioni elettroniche e altri libri su Dante, 451 via della letteratura, della scienza e dell’arte, issue 5, 2010) which is - still in the early twenty-first century - a valuable tool for any literary history study of Dante's work.

In 1829, Colomb de Batines created the library of Gap.

In the 1840s, he took the title "vicomte de Batines" after he left France and settled in Florence.

== Publications ==
- Bibliografia dantesca, ossia Catalogo delle edizioni, traduzioni, codici manoscritti e comenti della ‘Divina Commedia’ e delle opere minori di Dante, seguito dalla serie de’ biografi di lui, Prato, Tipografia Aldina, 1845-1846, in 2 vol.

Note : this edition will be completed with a third posthumous volume containing notes and manuscripts addition by Columbus de Batines : Giunte e correzioni inedite alla Bibliografica dantesca, éd. par Guido Biagi, Florence, Sansoni, 1888

- Réédition anastatique de la précédente : Rome, Salerno Editrice, « Biblioteca storica dantesca », 2008, in 3 vol.

Note: the third volume contains the general index, the Giunte e correzioni (additions and corrections) index, a postface by Stefano Zamponi in collaboration with Mauro Guerrini and Rossano De Laurentiis, and an index of the manuscripts established by Irene Ceccherini

Catalogs of his library and bookshop

- Catalogue d'une partie des livres composant la bibliothèque de M. C. de B. [Colombe de Batines], 26 November 1839 auction, Lyon, Fontaine, 1839
- Notice d'une partie des livres, 18 April 1845 auction, Paris, Délion, 1845

Books related to Dauphiné

- See a list of these works on the site of the Bibliothèque Dauphinoise
