= January 25 (Eastern Orthodox liturgics) =

Day in the Eastern Orthodox liturgical calendar

Eastern Orthodox liturgical calendar
January 24	January 25	January 26
January 25 O.S. ≍ February 7 N.S. January 25 N.S ≍ January 12 O.S.

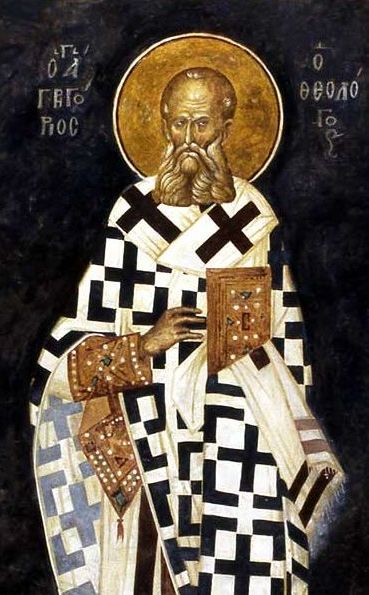
St. Gregory the Theologian of Nazianzus, Archbishop of Constantinople. (Chora Church, Constantinople).

January 25 in Eastern Orthodox liturgical calendars is a feast day and a day of commemoration of saints and martyrs. Although some Orthodox churches use the Revised Julian Calendar and others use the traditional Julian calendar, the fixed commemorations for their respective January 25 are broadly the same, no matter which calendar is used. (Note: Despite the dates being the same, the days to which they refer typically differ by 13 days. The notation Old Style or O.S. is sometimes used to indicate a date in the traditional Julian Calendar (the "Old Calendar"). The notation New Style or N.S, indicates a date in the Revised Julian calendar (the "New Calendar").)

== Saints ==
- Venerable Castinus, Bishop of Byzantium (240)
- Martyr Medula and her entourage.
- Venerable Apollo of the Thebaid, ascetic and wonderworker, reposed in peace (c. 361-363)
- Saint Bretanion (Vetranion), Bishop of Tomis in Moesia, Confessor (c. 380) (Note: "At Tomis, in Scythia, St. Bretannion, bishop, who by his great sanctity, and his zeal for the Catholic faith, shone in the Church, under the Arian emperor Valens, whom he opposed with fortitude.")
- Venerable Publius the Ascetic of Euphratensis, Syria (380)
- Venerable Theodotos, Igumen of the "Monastery of St. Publius".
- Saint Gregory the Theologian of Nazianzus, Archbishop of Constantinople (390)
- Venerable Mares the Singer of Omeros near Cyrrhus, Syria (430)
- Venerable Demetrius the Skeuophylax ("Keeper of the Sacred Vessels") of Constantinople (8th century)

== Pre-Schism Western saints ==
- Martyr Felicitas of Rome, and her seven sons (c. 164): (see also: November 23 - West)

- Januarius, Felix, Philip, Silvanus, Alexander, Vitalis, and Martial.

- Saint Artemas, a child martyr in Pozzuoli (Puteoli) in Italy.
- Saint Dwynwen of Llanddwyn Island, Patroness of Love and Marriage (c. 460) (Note: Born in Wales, churches dedicated to her are to be found in Wales and Cornwall. Her holy well and shrine at Llanddwyn in Anglesey were once centres of pilgrimage.)
- Saint Eochod of Galloway, Apostle of the Picts of Galloway (597) (Note: One of St. Columba's twelve companions, he was chosen to enlighten the Picts in Scotland. He is called the Apostle of the Picts of Galloway.)
- Saint Maurus (584) and Saint Placidus (6th century), early disciples of Saint Benedict.
- Saint Sigeberht of East Anglia (Sigebert), the first Christian King of East Anglia in England (634) (Note: The first Christian King of East Anglia in England. He introduced Orthodoxy into his kingdom, later himself becoming a monk. He was killed by the pagan King Penda of Mercia and was venerated as a martyr.)
- Saint Racho (Ragnobert), Bishop of Autun, France (c. 660)
- Hieromartyr Praejectus (Priest, Prest, Preils, Prix), Bishop of Clermont (676) (Note: He became Bishop of Clermont in Auvergne in France. He encouraged monasticism but was murdered by evildoers at Volvic in the Vosges.)
- Saint Amarinus, Abbot of a monastery in the Vosges in France, and companion in martyrdom of Saint Praejectus (Priest) (676) (Note: "At Clermont, in Auvergne, the Saints Projectus, bishop, and Marinus, a man of God, who were murdered by the leading men of that city.")
- Saint Thorgyth (Tortgith), nun at the convent of Barking in England with Saint Ethelburgh (c. 700) (Note: She is described as a miracle of patience under suffering.)
- Saint Poppo, Benedictine Abbot of Stavelot-Malmédy in Belgium, renowned for miracles (1048) (Note: Born in Flanders, after a military career he made a pilgrimage to Jerusalem and Rome. On his return he became a monk at St. Thierry in Rheims in 1006. Two years later he moved to Saint-Vannes and then to Vaast in Arras. In 1021 he became Abbot of Stavelot-Malmédy in Belgium and the monastic revival soon spread to other monasteries, among others to Hautmont, Marchiennes, St. Maximinus of Trier in Germany and St. Vaast in Arras in France.)

== Post-Schism Orthodox saints ==
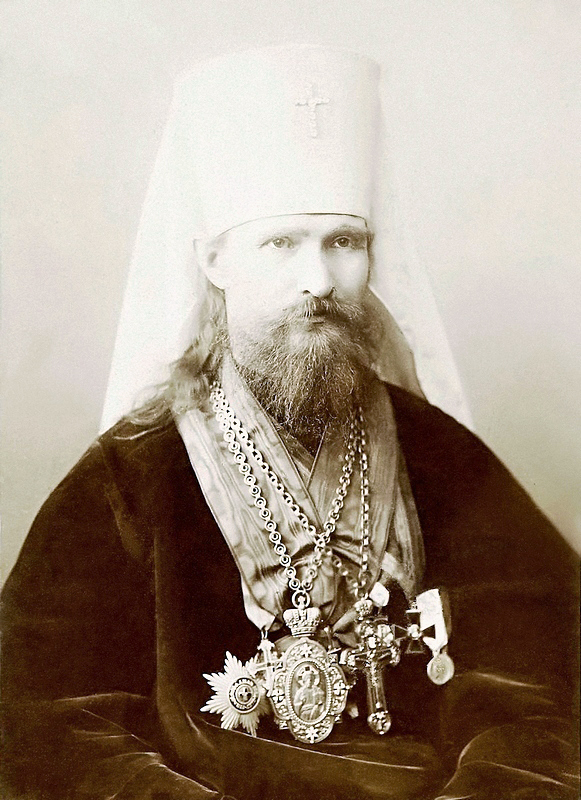
New Hieromartyr St. Vladimir (Bogoyavlensky), Metropolitan of Kiev, Protomartyr of the Communist yoke in Russia.

- Saint Moses, Archbishop of Novgorod (1362) (Note: See also: (in Russian) Моисей (архиепископ Новгородский). Википедии. (Russian Wikipedia).) (see also: April 19 - Translation)
- Saint Gregory of Golutvin (1405) (Note: See also: (in Russian) Григорий (епископ Коломенский) («Григорий Голутвинский»). Википедии. (Russian Wikipedia).)
- Saint Basian, Archbishop of Rostov (1515) (Note: See: (in Russian) Вассиан (Санин). Википедии. (Russian Wikipedia).)
- Venerable Anatole I Zertsalov, Elder of Optina Monastery (1894)
- Saint Gabriel, Bishop of Imereti, Georgia (1896) (Note: See: (in Georgian) გაბრიელი (ქიქოძე). ვიკიპედიაში. (Georgian Wikipedia).)

=== New martyrs and confessors ===
- New Martyr Auxentius of Constantinople (1720)
- Holy New Martyrs and Confessors of the Russian Orthodox Church (established 1992, 2013) (Note: See: (in Russian) Собор новомучеников и исповедников Церкви Русской. Википедии. (Russian Wikipedia).) (celebrated on the Sunday nearest to January 25)

- New Hieromartyr Vladimir Bogoyavlensky, Metropolitan of Kiev, Protomartyr of the Communist yoke in Russia (1918) (see also: June 14 - finding of relics)
- Venerable New Martyr Elizabeth Romanova (Princess Elisabeth of Hesse and by Rhine) (1918) (see also: July 5 - feast day)
- Venerable New Martyr Abbess Margaret Gunaronulo of Menzelino (1918) (Note: See: (in Russian) Маргарита (Гунаропуло). Википедии. (Russian Wikipedia).) (see also: August 9 - feast day)
- New Martyr Athanasia Lepeshkin, Abbess of Zosima Hermitage (Smolensk Hodigitria Convent) (ru), near Moscow (1932) (see also: April 29 - feast day)

- New Hieromartyr Peter Zverev, Archbishop of Voronezh (1929) (Note: See: (in Russian) Петр (Зверев). Википедии. (Russian Wikipedia).)
- New Hieromartyr Basil Zelentsov, Bishop of Priluki (1930) (Note: See: (in Russian) Василий (Зеленцов). Википедии. (Russian Wikipedia).) (see also: March 22)
- New Hieromartyr Stephen Grachev, Priest (1938)
- New Martyr Boris Zavarin (1938)

== Other commemorations ==
- Icon of the Most Holy Theotokos "Assuage My Sorrow" (1640) (Note: See also: (in Russian) Утоли моя печали (икона). Википедии. (Russian Wikipedia).)
- Icons of the Most Holy Theotokos "Unexpected Joy".
- Repose of Archpriest Sergius Orlov of Akulovo (1975) (Note: See also: (in Russian) Орлов, Сергей Васильевич (протоиерей). Википедии. (Russian Wikipedia).)

== Icon gallery ==
St. Gregory the Theologian of Nazianzus, Archbishop of Constantinople.
(Menologion of Basil II, 10th century).

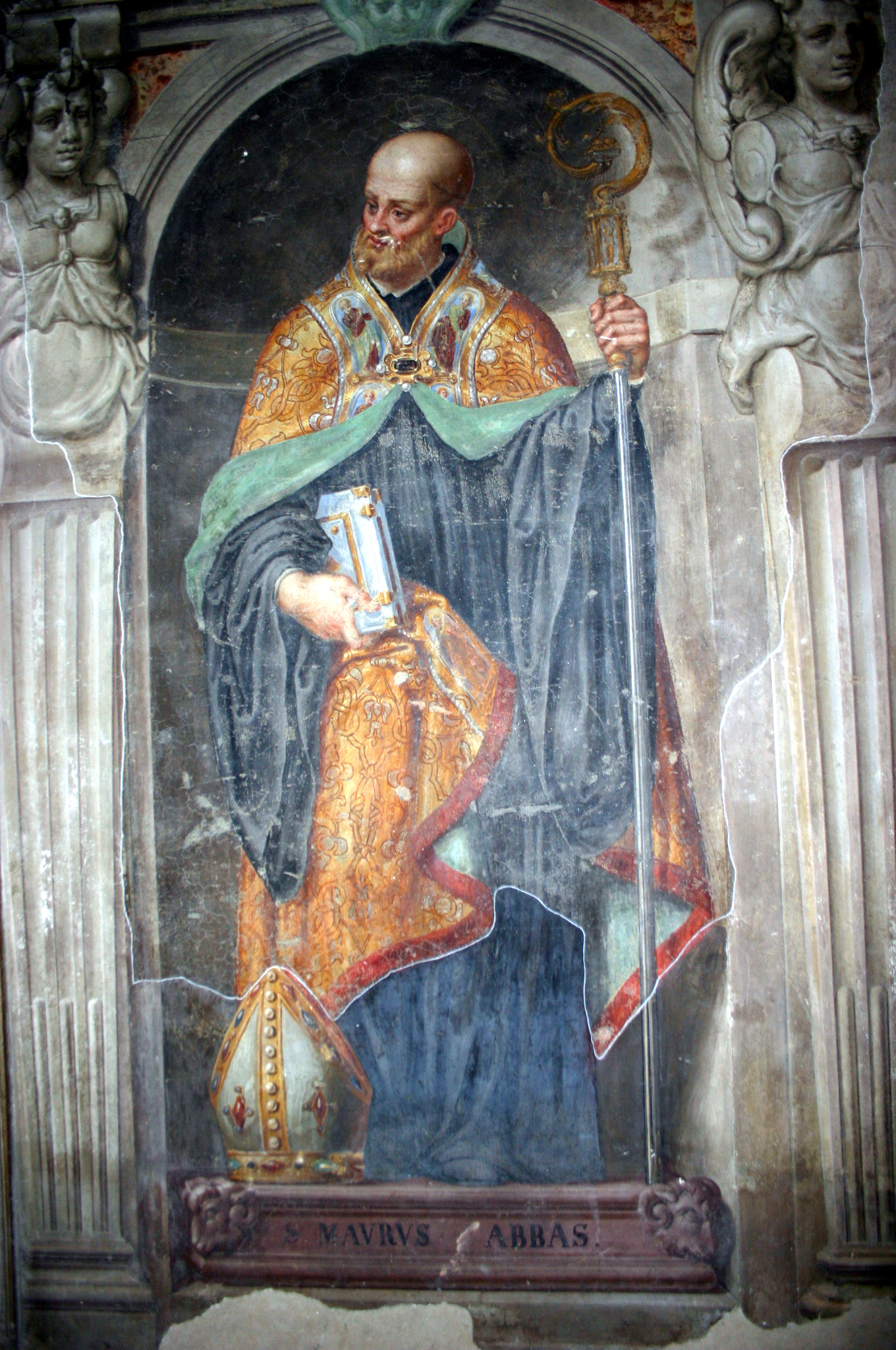
Saint Maurus (584), early disciple of Saint Benedict.

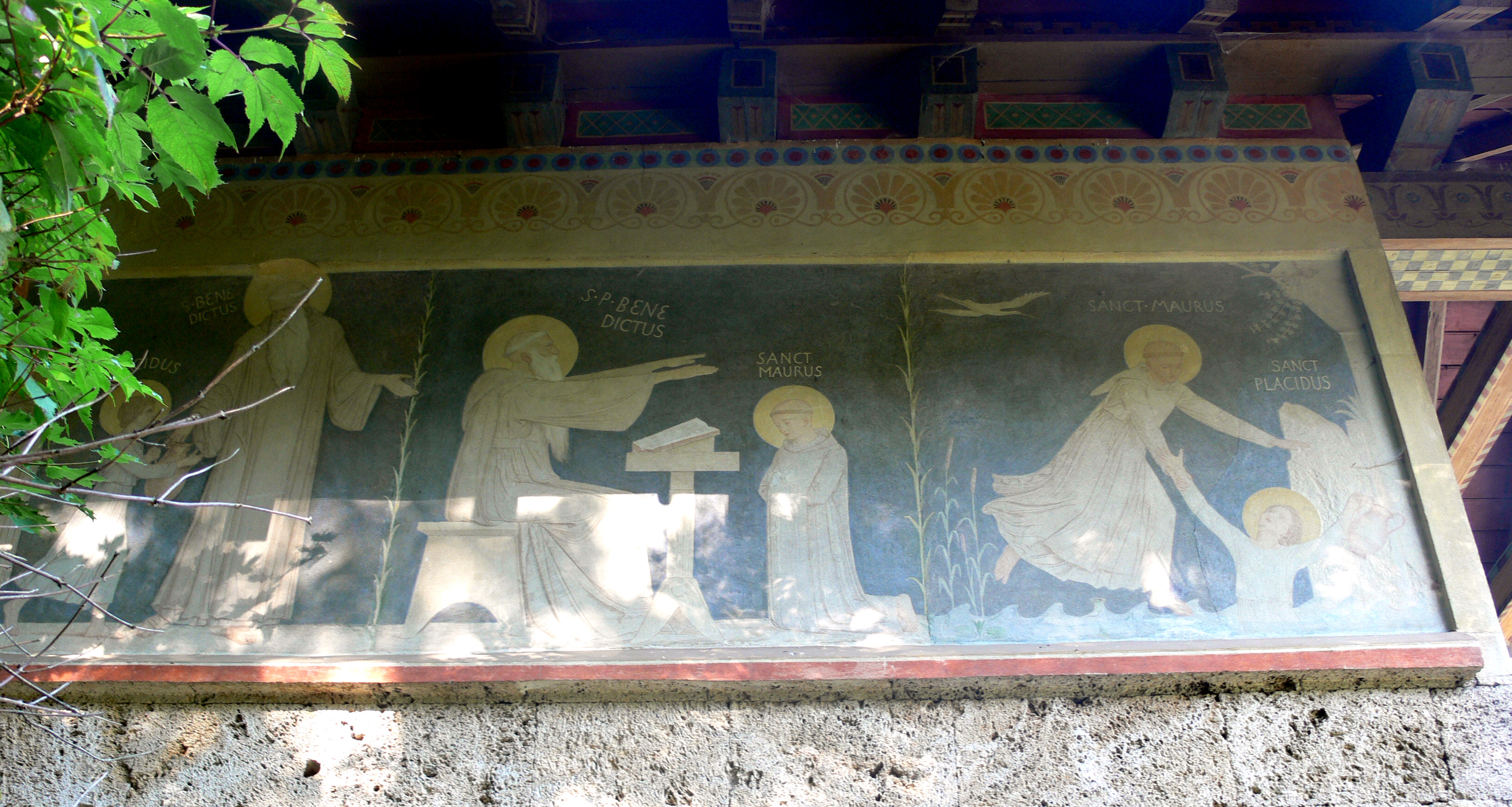
St. Benedict ordains St. Maurus and rescues St. Placidus.

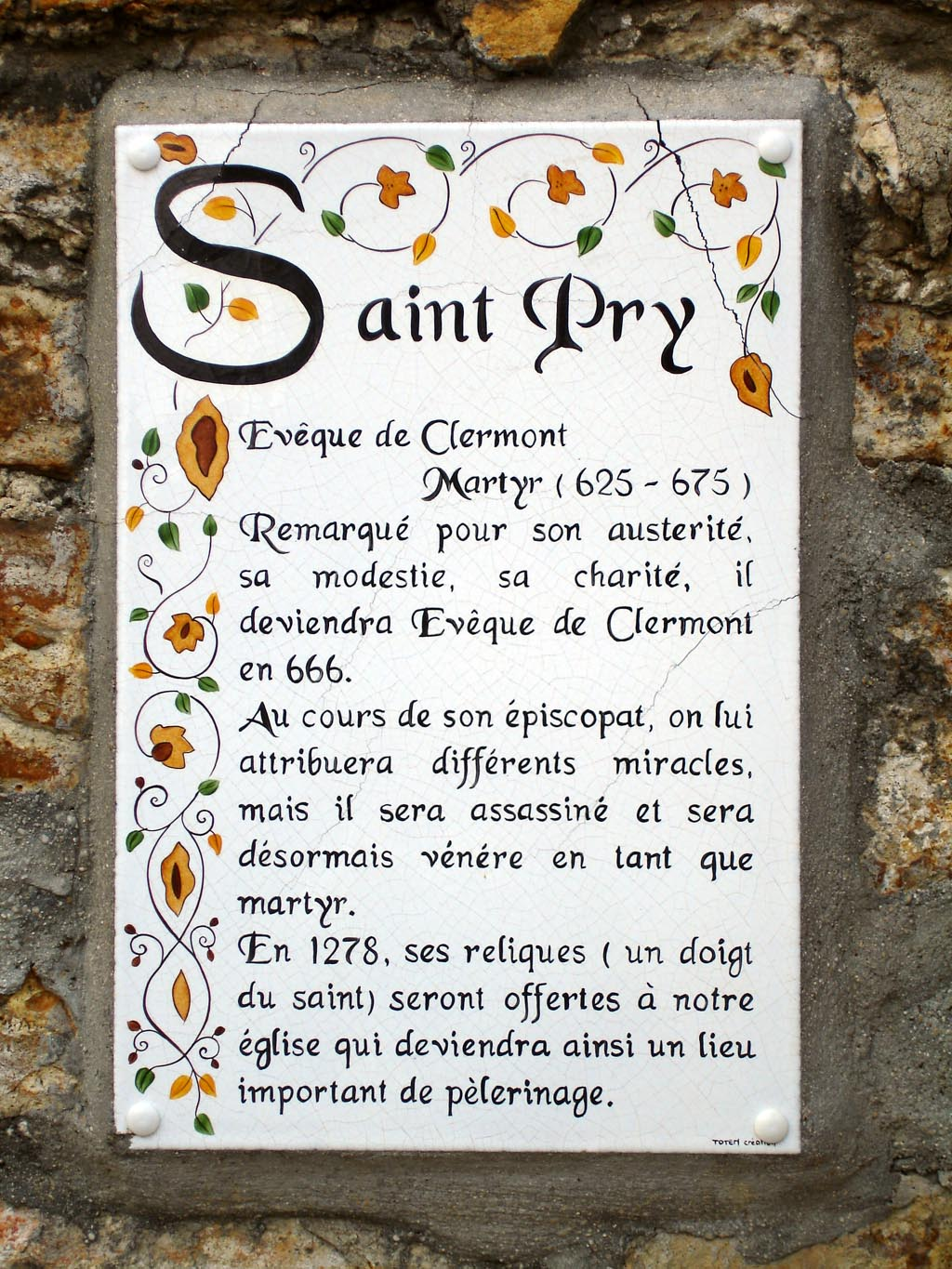
Plaque commemorating St. Praejectus (St. Pry), at Saint-Prix, Val-d'Oise.

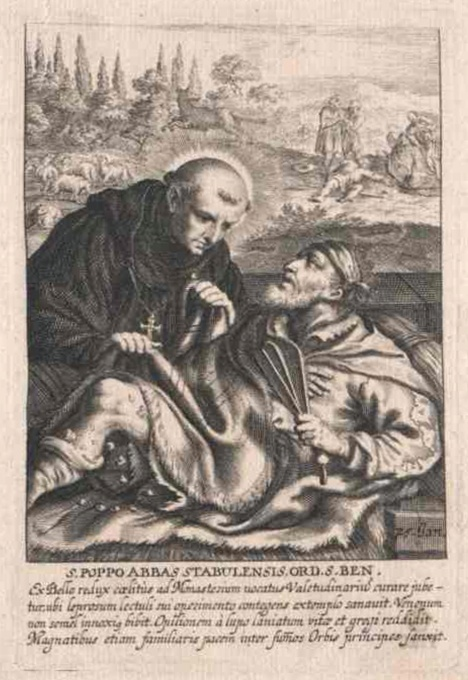
St. Poppo, Benedictine Abbot of Stavelot-Malmédy.

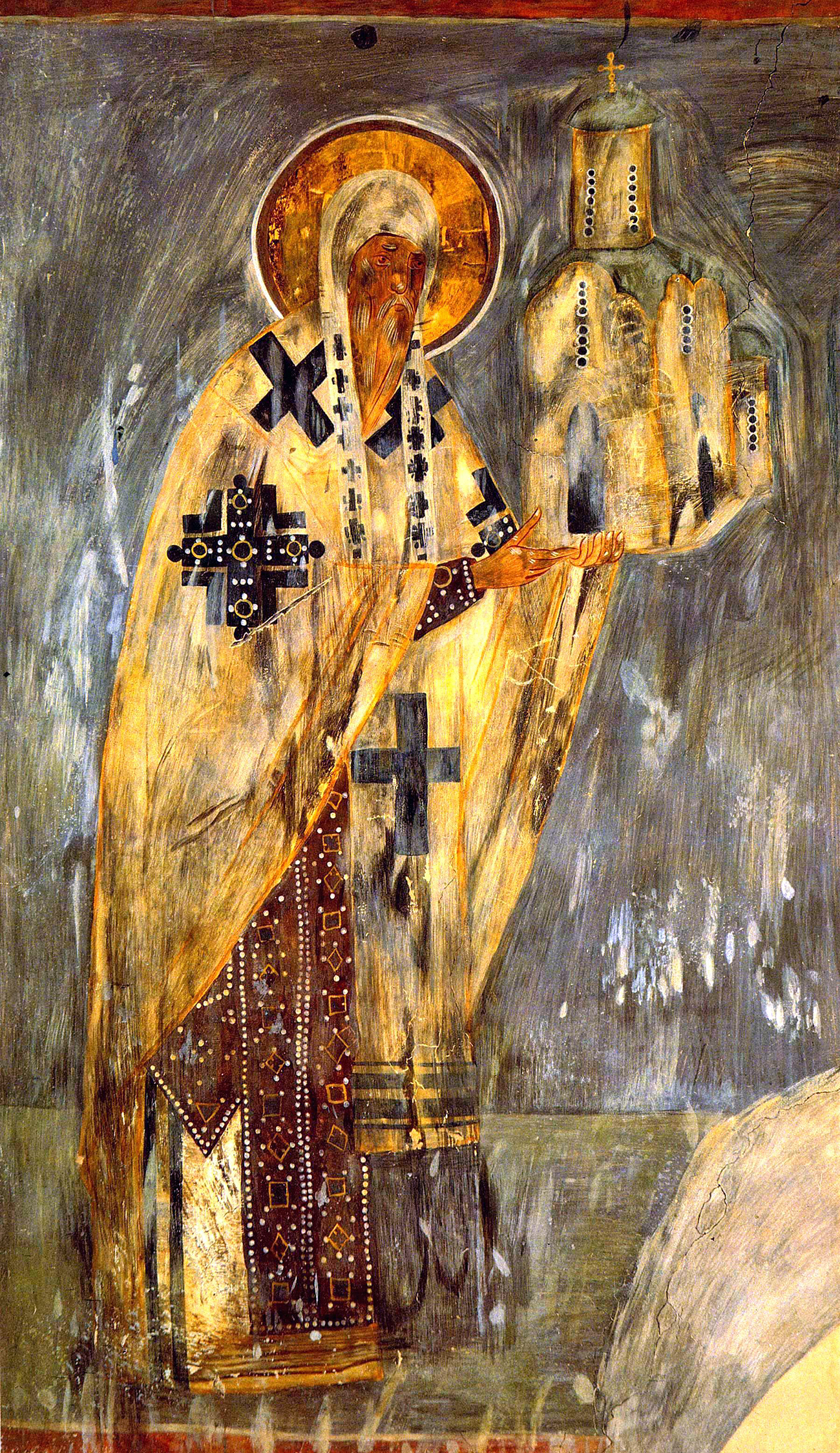
Saint Moses, Archbishop of Novgorod.

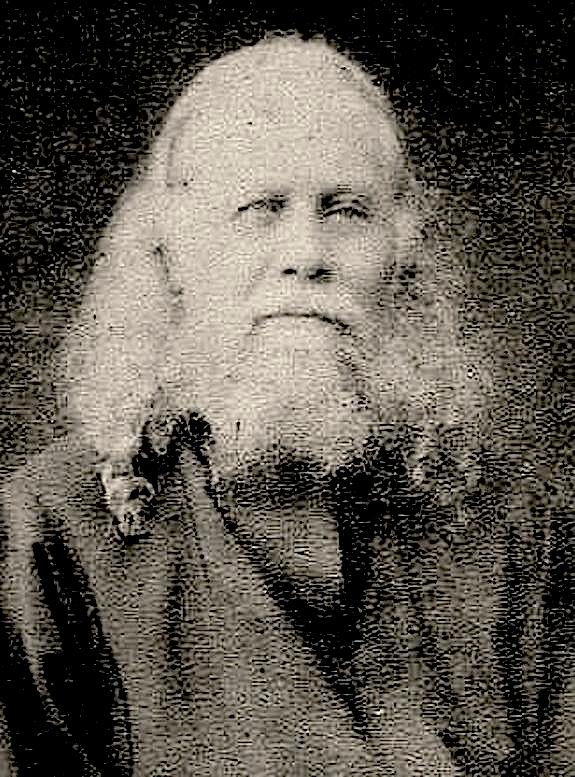
Venerable Anatole I Zertsalov, Elder of Optina Monastery.

St. Gabriel, Bishop of Imereti, Georgia.

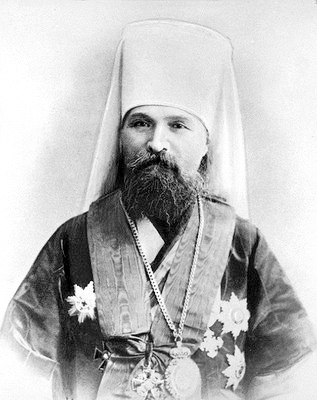
New Hieromartyr St. Vladimir (Bogoyavlensky), Metropolitan of Kiev, Protomartyr of the Communist yoke in Russia.

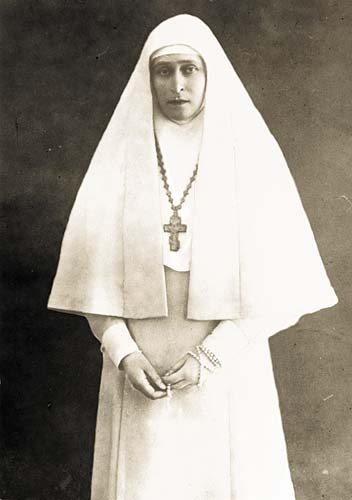
Venerable New Martyr St. Elizabeth Romanova (Grand Duchess Elizabeth Fyodorovna).

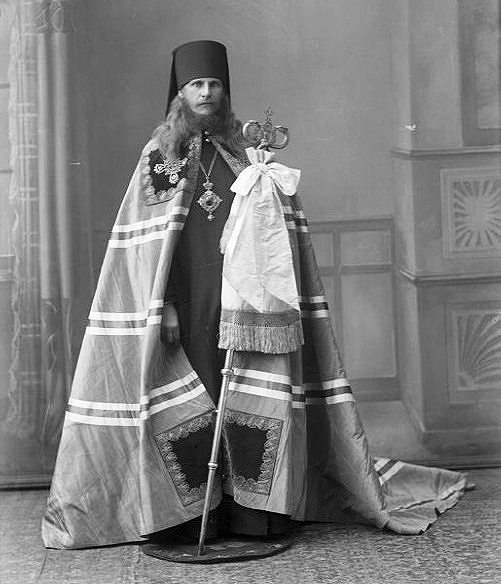
New Hieromartyr Peter Zverev, Archbishop of Voronezh.

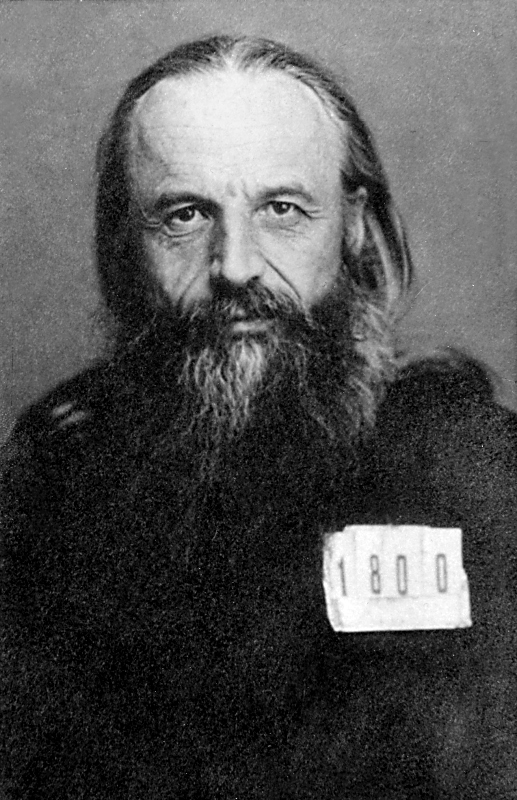
New Hieromartyr Basil Zelentsov, Bishop of Priluki.

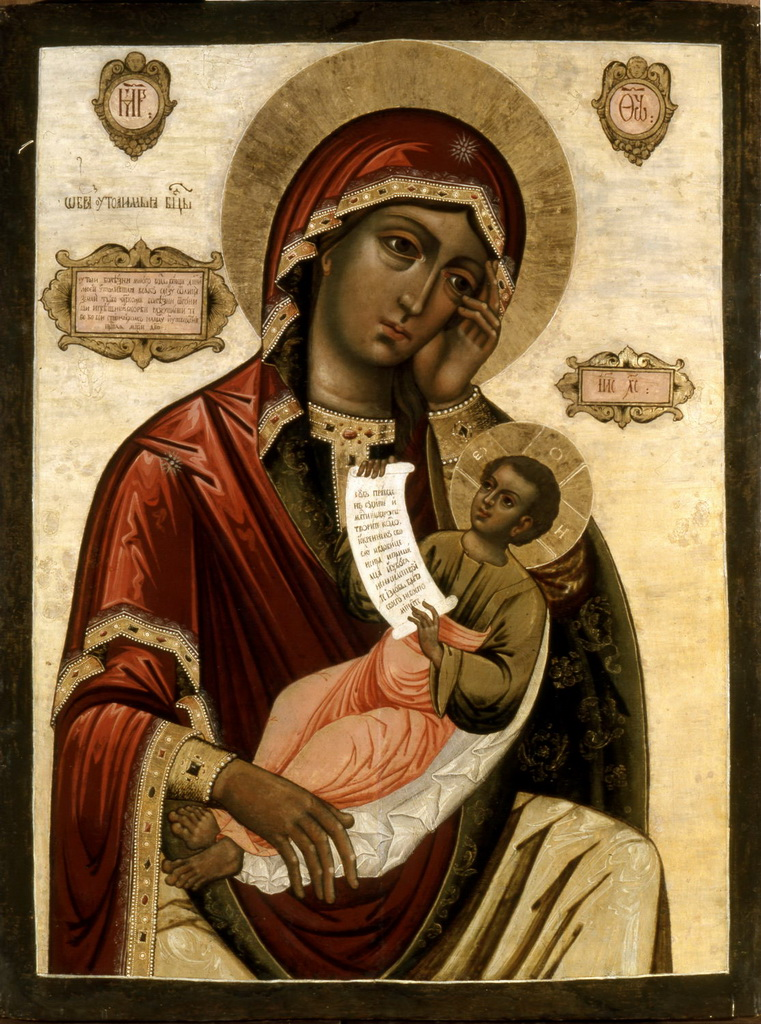
Icon of the Most Holy Theotokos "Assuage My Sorrow".

== Sources ==
- January 25 / February 7. Orthodox Calendar (PRAVOSLAVIE.RU).
- February 7 / January 25. HOLY TRINITY RUSSIAN ORTHODOX CHURCH (A parish of the Patriarchate of Moscow).
- January 25. OCA - The Lives of the Saints.
- The Autonomous Orthodox Metropolia of Western Europe and the Americas (ROCOR). St. Hilarion Calendar of Saints for the year of our Lord 2004. St. Hilarion Press (Austin, TX). p. 10.
- January 25. Latin Saints of the Orthodox Patriarchate of Rome.
- The Roman Martyrology. Transl. by the Archbishop of Baltimore. Last Edition, According to the Copy Printed at Rome in 1914. Revised Edition, with the Imprimatur of His Eminence Cardinal Gibbons. Baltimore: John Murphy Company, 1916. pp. 25–26.
- Rev. Richard Stanton. A Menology of England and Wales, or, Brief Memorials of the Ancient British and English Saints Arranged According to the Calendar, Together with the Martyrs of the 16th and 17th Centuries. London: Burns & Oates, 1892. pp. 35–36.

Greek Sources

- Great Synaxaristes: (in Greek) 25 ΙΑΝΟΥΑΡΙΟΥ. ΜΕΓΑΣ ΣΥΝΑΞΑΡΙΣΤΗΣ.
- (in Greek) Συναξαριστής. 25 Ιανουαρίου. ECCLESIA.GR. (H ΕΚΚΛΗΣΙΑ ΤΗΣ ΕΛΛΑΔΟΣ).

Russian Sources

- (in Russian) 7 февраля (25 января). Православная Энциклопедия под редакцией Патриарха Московского и всея Руси Кирилла (электронная версия). (Orthodox Encyclopedia - Pravenc.ru).
- (in Russian) 25 января (ст.ст.) 7 февраля 2013 (нов. ст.). Русская Православная Церковь Отдел внешних церковных связей. (DECR).
