= Georges Lagrange (bishop) =

French Roman Catholic bishop

- Bishop of Gap
- Church: Catholic Church
- Diocese: Diocese of Gap
- In office: 11 July 1988 – 18 November 2003
- Predecessor: Raymond Séguy
- Successor: Jean-Michel Di Falco

Orders
- Ordination: 29 June 1955
- Consecration: 18 September 1988 by Hyacinthe Thiandoum

Personal details
- Born: 23 November 1929 Châtillon-sur-Chalaronne, Ain, France
- Died: 11 December 2014 (aged 85)

Georges Lagrange (23 November 1929 – 11 December 2014) was a Roman Catholic bishop.

Ordained to the priesthood on 29 June 1955, Lagrange was appointed bishop of the Roman Catholic Diocese of Gap on 11 July 1988 and was ordained bishop on 18 September 1988. Lagrange resigned on 18 November 2003.
