= Antoine de Montazet =

French theologian and bishop (1713-1788)

His Grace Antoine de Montazet
- Archbishop of Lyon
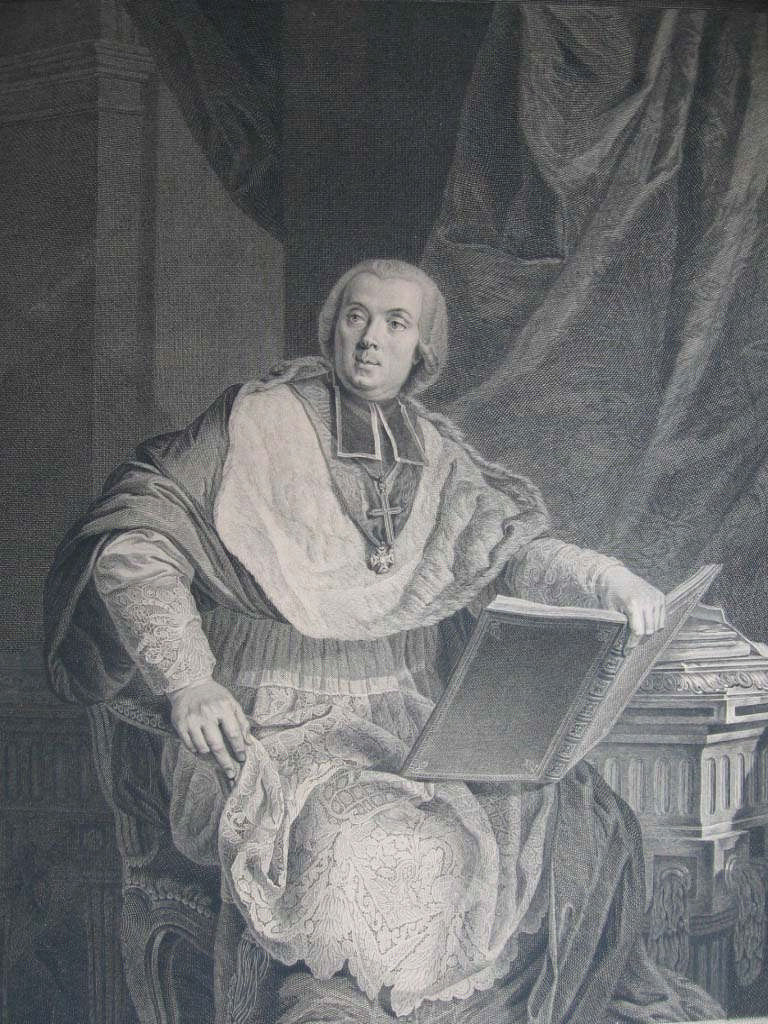
- Church: Roman Catholic
- Archdiocese: Lyon
- See: Cathedral of Saint John the Baptist of Lyon
- Installed: 2 August 1758
- Term ended: 2 May 1788
- Predecessor: Pierre Guérin de Tencin
- Successor: Yves-Alexandre de Marbeuf
- Other post: Bishop of Autun

Personal details
- Born: 17 August 1713 Laugnac, Aquitaine, France
- Died: 2 May 1788 (aged 74)

Antoine de Montazet (17 August 1713 – 2 May 1788) was a French theologian of Jansenist tendencies, who became bishop of Autun and archbishop of Lyon. He was elected to the Académie Française in 1756, but did not produce significant literary works.

Montazet was born in Laugnac. He had published for his seminary by the Oratorian Joseph Valla, six volumes of "Institutiones theologicæ". These were known as "Théologie de Lyon", and were spread throughout Italy by Scipio de' Ricci, bishop of Pistoia and Prato, until condemned by the Index Librorum Prohibitorum in 1792.

Contrary to the papal bull of Pope Pius V on the Roman Breviary, Montazet changed the texts of both the Breviary and the Missal. The later efforts of Pope Pius IX and Cardinal Bonald to suppress the innovations of Montazet provoked resistance on the part of the canons, who defended the traditional Lyonnese ceremonies.
