= Victor-Félix Bernadou =

French cardinal

His Eminence Victor-Félix Bernadou
- Archbishop of Sens
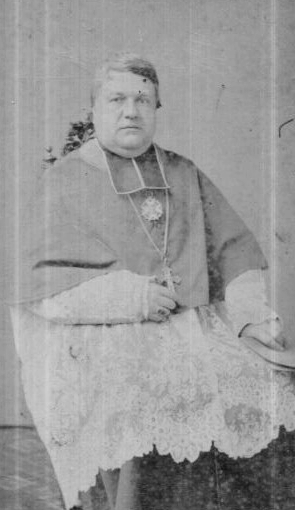
- The then-archbishop circa 1870.
- Church: Roman Catholic Church
- Archdiocese: Sens
- See: Sens
- Appointed: 12 July 1867
- Installed: 3 September 1867
- Term ended: 15 November 1891
- Predecessor: Mellon de Jolly
- Successor: Pierre-Marie-Etienne-Gustave Ardin
- Other post: Cardinal-Priest of Santissima Trinità al Monte Pincio (1887-91)
- Previous post: Bishop of Gap (1862-67)

Orders
- Ordination: 19 December 1840 by Jean-Marie-Léon Dizien
- Consecration: 29 June 1862 by Jean-Joseph-Marie-Eugène de Jerphanion
- Created cardinal: 7 June 1886 by Pope Leo XIII
- Rank: Cardinal-Priest

Personal details
- Born: Victor-Félix Bernadou; 25 June 1816 Castres, French Kingdom
- Died: 15 November 1891 (aged 75) Sens, French Third Republic
- Buried: Sens Cathedral
- Parents: Jean Louis Bernadou; Marguerite Elisabeth Vincens
- Coat of arms

Victor-Félix Bernadou (25 June 1816 – 15 November 1891) was a French cardinal and Archbishop of Sens.

== Biography ==
Born in Castres, he was ordained to the priesthood on 19 December 1840. By 7 April 1862 he was appointed bishop of Gap, received his episcopal consecration on 29 June 1862 from Archbishop Jean-Joseph-Marie-Eugène de Jerphanion, with bishops Louis-Antoine Pavy and Jean-Jacques Bardou serving as co-consecrators. He was promoted to metropolitan see of Sens on 12 July 1867, where he remained until his death. He took part in First Vatican Council. On 7 July 1886 Pope Leo XIII created him Cardinal Priest.

He died in Sens, and was buried in Cathédrale Saint-Étienne de Sens..

Catholic Church titles
Preceded by Jean-Irénée Depéry	Bishop of Gap; 1862–1867	Succeeded by Aimé-Victor-François Guilbert
Preceded by Mellon de Jolly	Archbishop of Sens; 1867–1891	Succeeded by Pierre-Marie-Etienne-Gustave Ardin
