= Yves-Alexandre de Marbeuf =

French bishop (1734-1799)

The Most Reverend Yves-Alexandre de Marbeuf
- Archbishop of Lyon; Primate of the Gauls
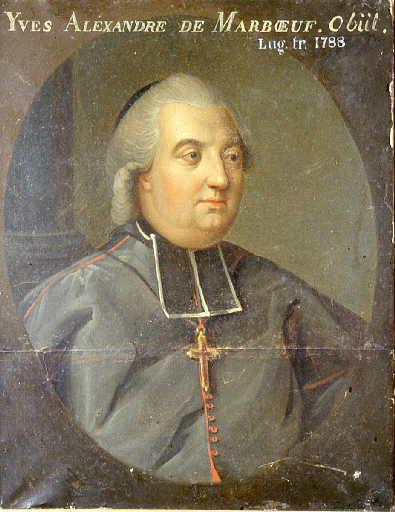
- Church: Roman Catholic
- In office: 1788–99
- Predecessor: Antoine de Montazet
- Successor: Joseph Fesch
- Previous post: Bishop of Autun (1767–88)

Orders
- Ordination: 1754
- Consecration: 12 July 1767 by Antoine de Montazet

Personal details
- Born: 17 May 1734 Rennes, France
- Died: 15 April 1799 (aged 64)

Yves-Alexandre de Marbeuf (Rennes, 1734-Lübeck, 1799) was a French bishop of Autun and archbishop of Lyon, and statesman. He was an opponent of the European Enlightenment thinking, and of Jansenism.

He went into exile after the French Revolution.

== Biography ==
Nephew of the Comte de Marbeuf, protector of Napoleon Bonaparte in his youth, he was appointed Bishop of Autun on April 19, 1767, the seat he held until 1788; his successor is the famous Charles Maurice de Talleyrand-Périgord. He then accesses the lucrative archbishopric of Lyon (50 000 annual pension of pounds). He also received in 1782 the Abbey of Bec, he was the last abbot.

Under the Old Regime, he was Minister of sheet profit, which managed the allocation of ecclesiastical positions in France.

From the early revolutionary times Marbeuf arises as a conservative. He is not opposed to the aux États généraux, but stood strongly against the Constitution civile du clergé.

He decided to emigrate and was replaced in the see of Lyon by Bishop Antoine-Adrien Lamourette, juror, but in the eyes of the Catholic Church, Bishop Marbeuf was the legitimate bishop of Lyon until his death in 1799.
