= Pragmatius of Autun =

French Catholic bishop and saint

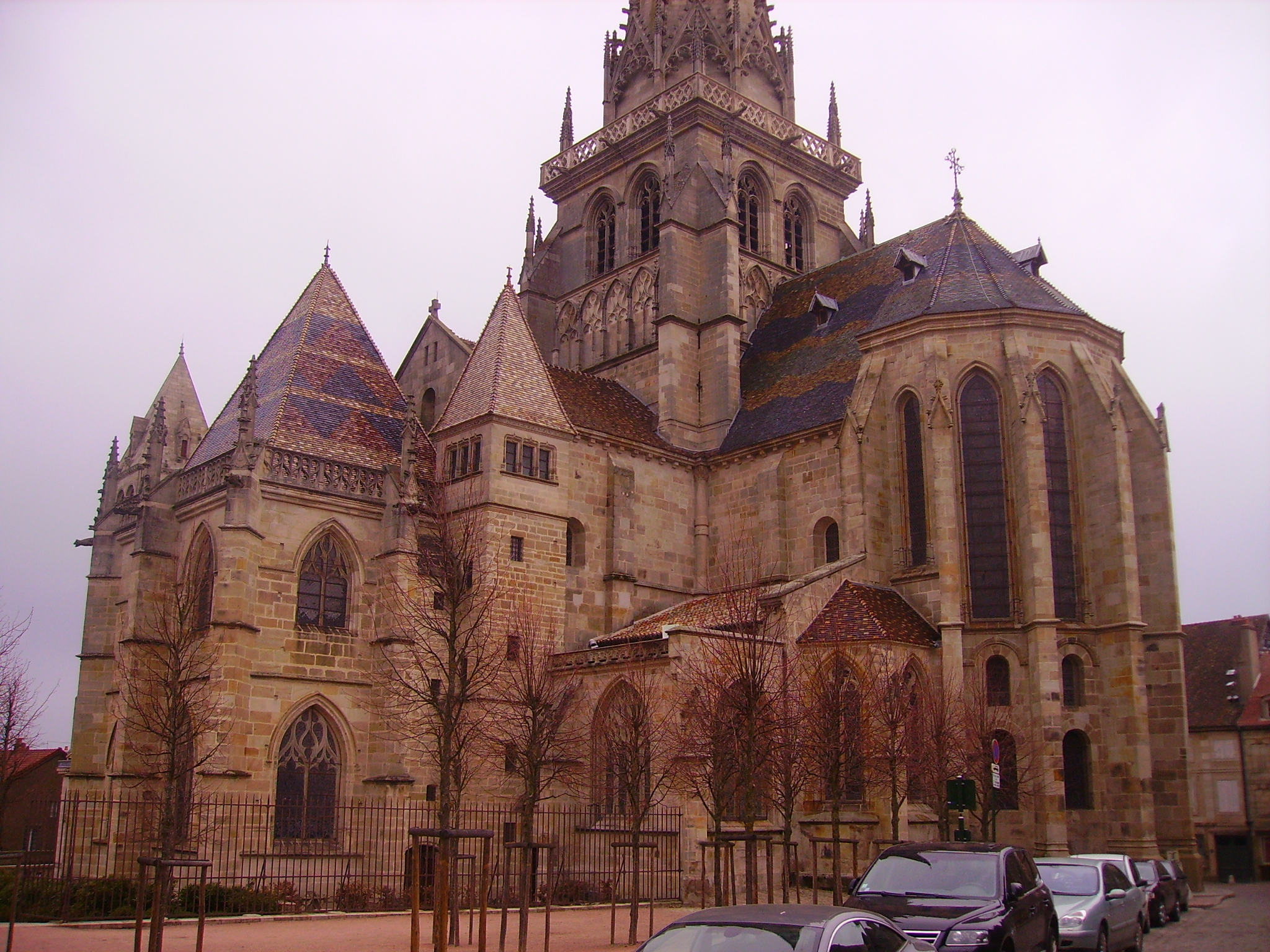
Autun Cathedral

Saint Pragmatius of Autun (French: Pragmace; fl. c.520) was Bishop of Autun in the 6th century. He was a friend of Sidonius Apollinaris and Avitus of Vienne, and he participated in at least one of the councils of his time. He is venerated as a saint by the Roman Catholic Church; his feast day is celebrated on 22 November.
