= Saint Tigrides =

Legendary saint and second Bishop of Gap, France

Saint Tigrides is a legendary saint and the equally legendary second Bishop of Gap, France.

Very little is known of his life. He is celebrated locally with a feast day on 3 February, as is noted in the Martyrologicum Hieronymianum. There is no other evidence for Teredius (or Tigrides).
