= Aredius of Gap =

Aredius of Gap (Arigius, Arey) (c. 575, Chalon-sur-Saône – c. 605) was bishop of Gap.

He is a Catholic and Orthodox saint, with feast day May 1.
