= Vellesius of Gap =

6th Century French bishop

Vellesius of Gap was a 6th-century bishop of Gap, in France.

Very little is known of his life though his career was at a time of great expansion for Christianity in France.

Bishop Vellesius was present at the Council of Orange in October 549, the Council of Paris in 552 and was represented by the priest Honoratus at the Council of Arles in 554
