= Diocese of Gap-Embrun =

Catholic diocese in France

Coordinates: 44.5581°N 6.0781°E

Diocese of Gap and Embrun Dioecesis Vapincensis et Ebrodunensis Diocèse de Gap et d'Embrun

Catholic
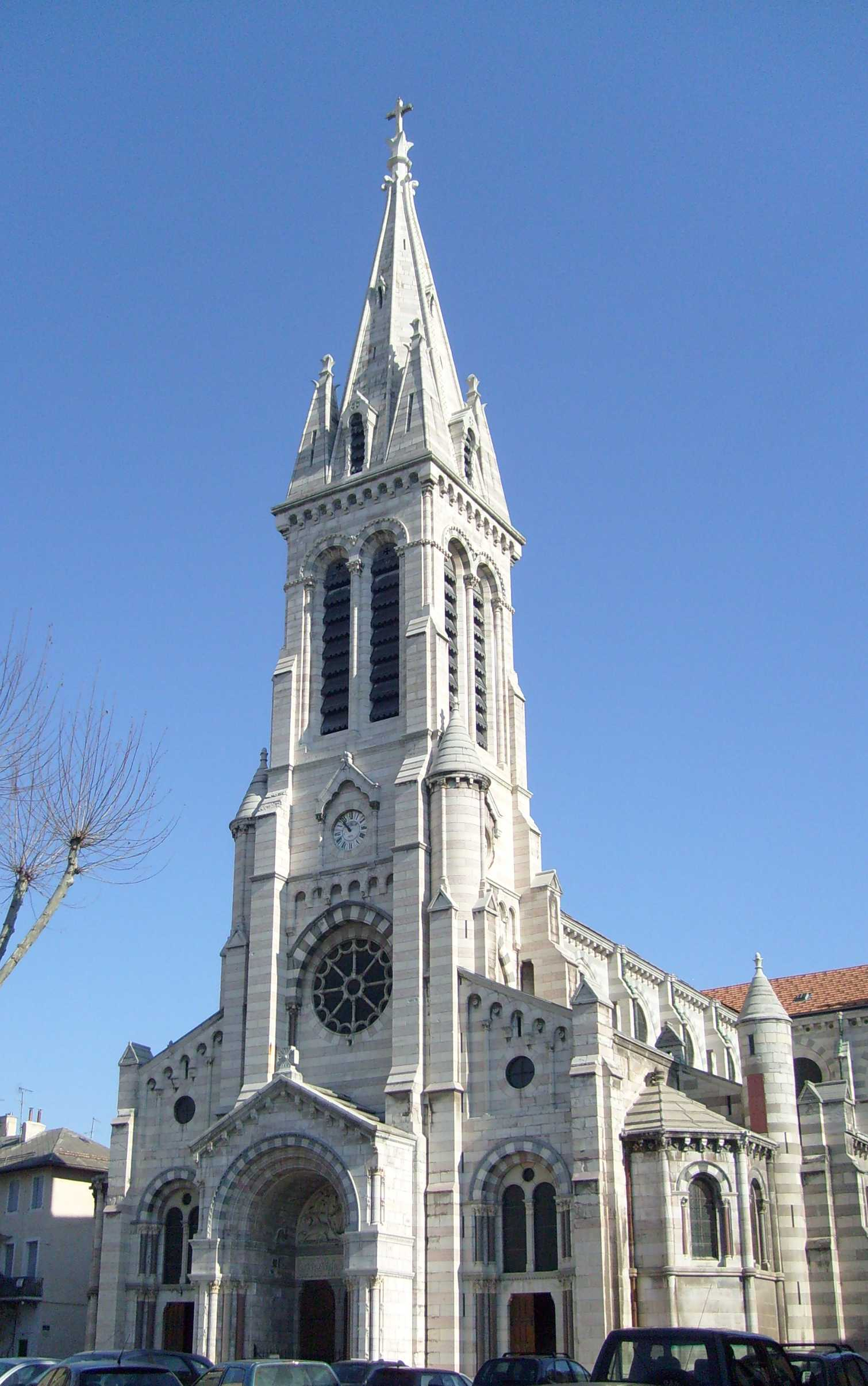
- Gap Cathedral (constructed 1866–1905)

Location
- Country: France
- Ecclesiastical province: Marseille
- Metropolitan: Archdiocese of Marseille

Statistics
- Area: 5,643 km^{2} (2,179 sq mi)
- Population: Total; Catholics: (as of 2021); 141,576; 121,700 (86%)
- Parishes: 169

Information
- Denomination: Catholic
- Sui iuris church: Latin Church
- Rite: Roman Rite
- Established: 5th Century
- Cathedral: Cathedral of Notre-Dame and Saint Arnoux in Gap
- Secular priests: 43 (Diocesan); 8 (Religious Orders); 15 Permanent Deacons

Current leadership
- Pope: Leo XIV
- Bishop: Xavier Malle
- Metropolitan Archbishop: Jean-Marc Aveline
- Bishops emeritus: Jean-Michel di Falco Léandri (2003-2017)

Map

Website
- diocesedegap.fr

The Diocese of Gap and Embrun (Latin: Dioecesis Vapincensis et Ebrodunensis; French: Diocèse de Gap et d'Embrun) is a Latin Church ecclesiastical territory or diocese of the Catholic Church in Provence-Alpes-Côte d'Azur region of Southern France.

The episcopal see is Gap Cathedral, in the city of Gap. It has a co-cathedral, the Co-cathédrale of Notre Dame in Embrun. The diocese also has a minor basilica, the Basilique Notre-Dame du Laus, in Saint-Étienne-le-Laus. The Diocese of Gap and Embrun is a suffragan diocese in the ecclesiastical province of the metropolitan Archdiocese of Marseille.

The current bishop is Xavier Malle.

== Statistics ==
In 2014, the diocese served an estimated 121,700 Catholics (85.8% of an estimated 141,900 total) in 188 parishes and a mission. It had 55 priests (51 diocesan, 4 religious), 8 deacons, 71 lay religious (5 brothers, 66 sisters) and 3 seminarians. In 2017 there were 59 diocesan priests, 17 of whom were seventy-five years of age or older (and three over the age of ninety). Only one is under the age of thirty.

== History ==
=== Early Gap ===
Ancient traditions in liturgical books, of which at least one dates from the fourteenth century, state that the first Bishop of Gap was St. Demetrius, disciple of the Apostles and martyrs. Victor de Buck in the Acta Sanctorum finds nothing inadmissible in these traditions, while Canon Albanès defends them against Joseph Roman. Albanès names as bishops of Gap the martyr St. Tigris (fourth century), then St. Remedius (394–419), whom Louis Duchesne makes a Bishop of Antibes and who was involved in the struggle between Pope Zosimus and Bishop Proculus of Marseilles. According to Duchesne the first historically known bishop is Constantinus, present at the Council of Epaone in 517. The church of Gap had, among other bishops, Aredius of Gap (or St. Arey, 579–610?), who had at Gap a school, and who was held in esteem by Pope Gregory the Great. Worth mention is St. Arnoux (1065–1078), who had been a monk of the abbey of Saint-Trinité de Vendome, and was named bishop by Pope Alexander II to replace the simoniac Bishop Ripert. Arnoux became a patron saint of the city of Gap.

=== Medieval Gap ===
In 890, the bishops of Provence assembled in the Council of Valence, under the leadership of the archbishops of Lyon, Arles, Embrun, and Vienne. The bishops took note of the fact that Archbishop Bernoin of Vienne had been to Rome to complain to the pope of the increasing disorder of the kingdom since the death of Charlemagne. They singled out the invasions of the Northmen and of the Saracens, who had caused the depopulation of the entire area. On 7 July 1057, Pope Victor II wrote a letter of privileges for Archbishop Winimann (Viminien) of Embrun, whom he had consecrated and to whom he had given the pallium. In the bull, the Pope took note of the invasion, occupation, and devastation of the city of Embrun by the Saracens, a city only 40 km. from Gap. Embrun had also been a place of refuge for undisciplined people fleeing from other localities. The whole of Provence, in fact, suffered from similar difficulties in the eighth and ninth centuries.

On 31 July 1178, Bishop Gregory of Gap obtained a bull from the Emperor Frederic Barbarossa which made him Count of the City and territory of Gap. The bishops were still subjects of the Count of Forcalquier, which became the property of Raymond of Bérenger, Count of Provence.

=== Huguenots ===
In 1561 a Protestant preacher arrived in Gap from Geneva, and on 31 July began public preaching at an old mill next to the church of the Cordeliers outside the walls of Gap. On 16 and 17 November he preached publicly inside the city, at Sainte-Colombe. The consuls of Gap reported the incidents to the Lieutenant-General of the King, La Motte Gondrin, who immediately ordered the guilty preacher to be arrested for violating the king's edict. In 1562, however, the Protestant armies defeated and killed La Motte Gondrin, and on 1 May they attacked and took control of Gap. Bishop Gabriel de Clermont abandoned his post and apostasized. The preacher was released from prison and celebrated the Protestant triumph. In October, however, the Catholics in the neighborhood came up from Tallard and attacked Gap and drove the Protestants out. In 1568 however, bands of Protestant soldiers, encouraged by the successes of the armies of the Prince de Condé, engaged in battle at Gap and massacred more than one hundred Catholics whom they trapped inside the city. They then retired to Veynes and Die, leaving what was left of Gap to the Catholics. But in September 1576 another Protestant force, led by the Duc de Lesdiguières, having been refused entry into Gap, on the night of 2/3 January 1577 were admitted to the city by Protestants living in Gap, seized and sacked the city. The bishop, Paparin de Chaumont, fled. The episcopal palace, the residence of the canons, the cathedral, and six religious establishments were damaged or destroyed. They held the city until 1581. In September, Bishop Paparin de Chaumont was able to return, under the protection of the Duc de Mayenne and the forces of the Catholic League.

=== French revolution ===
In 1790 the National Constituent Assembly decided to bring the French church under the control of the State. Civil government of the provinces was to be reorganized into new units called 'départements', originally intended to be 83 or 84 in number. The dioceses of the Roman Catholic Church were to be reduced in number, to coincide as much as possible with the new departments. Since there were more than 130 bishoprics at the time of the Revolution, more than fifty dioceses needed to be suppressed and their territories consolidated. Clergy would need to take an oath of allegiance to the State and its Constitution, specified by the Civil Constitution of the Clergy, and they would become salaried officials of the State. Both bishops and priests would be elected by special 'electors' in each department. This meant schism, since bishops would no longer need to be approved (preconised) by the Papacy; the transfer of bishops, likewise, which had formerly been the exclusive prerogative of the pope in canon law, would be the privilege of the State; the election of bishops no longer lay with the Cathedral Chapters (which were all abolished), or other responsible clergy, or the Pope, but with electors who did not even have to be Catholics or Christians. All monasteries, convents and religious orders in France were dissolved, and their members were released from their vows by order of the National Constituent Assembly (which was uncanonical); their property was confiscated "for the public good", and sold to pay the bills of the French government. Cathedral Chapters were also dissolved.

The diocese of Gap and the diocese of Embrun were suppressed by the Legislative Assembly, and the territories combined into a new diocese, Hautes-Alpes, with its seat at Gap. A new bishop, to replace Bishop La Broue de Vareilles, whose seat was declared vacant since he had refused to take the oath to the Civil Constitution, was to be elected. Ignace de Cazeneuve, a Canon of the Cathedral Chapter of Gap, was elected by special Electors in March 1791, and was consecrated in Paris on 3 April by Constitutional Bishop Jean-Baptiste Gobel. He ceased functioning after 1793, and resigned on 1 June 1798. Fr. André Garnier was named bishop in succession to Cazeneuve by the Metropolitan, Jean-Baptiste-Siméon Aubert, and was consecrated in Aix on 19 January 1800. He resigned in 1801.

In 1799, Pope Pius VI, made a prisoner by order of the Directory, was being transported from Florence to Valence, he passed through Gap on 29 June and bestowed his blessing on the crowds which had gathered to see him. He spent the night in Gap, and received some of the local notables. The Pope died in prison in Valence on 29 August 1799.

The diocese of Gap and the diocese of Embrun were legally suppressed by the Concordat of 1801 between First Consul Napoleon Bonaparte and Pope Pius VII. In the Bull Qui Christi Domini of 29 November 1801, the departments of Hautes-Alpes and of Basses-Alpes were united in a single diocese with its seat at Digne. Other territories were reassigned to the restored Diocese of Avignon, Diocese of Grenoble and Diocese of Valence.

The diocese of Gap was re-established at least in theory by the Concordat of 1817 between King Louis XVIII and Pope Pius VII, but its implementation was delayed by the refusal of the Chamber of Deputies to ratify the treaty. There was no diocese of Gap between 1801 and 1822. The diocese was actually restored on 6 (or 10) October 1822, comprising, besides the ancient diocese of Gap, a large part of the ancient Archdiocese of Embrun. The diocese of Gap was made a suffragan of the archdiocese of Aix. The name of the Metropolitan see of Embrun had been absorbed in the title of the Archbishop of Aix-en-Provence and Arles until 2007. In 2008, the title was reattached to the Diocese of Gap by a decision of the Congregation of Bishops, conveyed in a letter of Cardinal Giovanni Battista Ré, the Prefect. The diocese was divided into two Archdeaconries: Saint-Arnoux and Notre-Dame-d'Embrun. The Major Seminary was at Gap, and the Minor Seminary at Embrun. In 2017, there is no longer a diocesan seminary; students for the priesthood are sent to the Diocesan Seminary of Saint-Luc d'Aix en Provence.

In 1947 it gained territory from Metropolitan Archdiocese of Torino (Turin, in Piemonte, Italy).

=== Cathedral and Chapter ===
The Cathedral of the Assumption of Notre-Dame was served by a chapter composed of four dignities (dignités; not dignitaries): the dean, the archdeacon, the provost, and the sacristan. There were in addition nine canons (one of whom was called the Canon Theological and another Capiscol. Gap was unique among the churches of Province, in that its Cathedral Chapter was not headed by its provost, but by its dean. In 2017, there was a Dean and ten Canons.

== Bishops ==
=== to 1000 ===
[Saint Demetrius (end of 1st century)]
Saint Tigrides (4th century ?)
Saint Remedius (394–419)
[Saint Constantinus (439)]

- Constantius (517–529)
- Vellesius (541–554)
- Sagittarius (560?–578)
- Aredius of Gap (579–610?)
- Valatonius (610?–614)
- Potentissimus (c. 647–653)
- Symphorianus (700?)
- Donadeus (788)
- Biraco (c. 876–879)
- Castus (950)
- Hugo (I) (971 – after 988)

=== 1000 to 1300 ===
- Féraud (1010–1040)
- Rodolphe (1044–1050)
- Ripert (1053–1060)
- Arnulphus (Arnoux) (c. 1065 – 1070s)
- Laugier I (1079–1081)
- Odilon (1085?)
- Isoard (1090?–1105)
- Laugier II (1106–1122)
- Pierre Grafinel (1122–1130)
- Guillaume I (1131–1149)
- Raimond (1150–1156)
- Grégoire (1157–1180)
- Guillaume II (1180–1188)
- Frédéric (c. 1188–c. 1198)
- Guillaume de Gières (c. 1199–1211)
- Hugues (II) (c.1215 – 1217)
- Guigo (1217–1219)
- Guillaume d'Esclapon (1219–1235), abbé de Lérins
- Robert, O.P. (1235–1251)
- Othon de Grasse (1251–1281)
- Raimond de Mévouillon (1282–1289)
- Geofroi de Lincel (1289–1315)

=== 1300 to 1600 ===
- Olivier de Laye (1315–1316)
- Bertrand de Lincel (1316–1318)
- Guillaume d'Étienne (1318–1328)
- Dragonnet de Montauban (1328–1349)
- Henri de Poitiers (1349–1353)
- Gilbert de Mendegaches (1353–1357)
- Jacques de Deaux (1357–1362)
- Guillaume Fournier (1362–1366)
- Jacques Artaud (1366–1399)

Raimond de Bar (1399–1404)

- Jean des Saints (1404 – 20 August 1409)
- Antoine Juvénis (1409–1409?1411)
- Alessio di Siregno, O.F.M. (20 August 1409 – 27 August 1411
- Laugier Sapor (1411–1429)
- Guillaume de Forestier (11 February 1429 – 1442)
- Gaucher de Forcalquier (17 December 1442 – 5 April 1484)
- Gabriel de Sclafanatis (1484–1526)
- Gabriel de Clermont (1526–1571)
- Pierre Paparin (1572–1600)

=== 1600 to 1800 ===
- Charles-Salomon du Serre (1600–1637)
- Arthur de Lionne (1639–1662)
- Pierre Marion (1662–1675)
- Guillaume de Meschatin (1677–1679)
- Victor-Augustin de Méliand (27 May 1680 – 27 June 1684)
- Charles-Béningne Hervé (1692–1705)
- François Berger de Malissoles (3 April 1706 – death 21 September 1738)
- Claude de Cabanes (22 June 1739 – death 10 September 1741)
- Jacques-Marie de Caritat de Condorcet (20 December 1741 – 16 December 1754)
- Pierre-Annet de Pérouse (1754–1763)
- François de Narbonne-Lara (20 February 1764 – 18 April 1774)
- François-Gaspard de Jouffroy de Gonsans (28 February 1774 – 1 June 1778)
- Jean-Baptiste-Marie de Maillé de la Tour-Landry (30 March 1778 – 25 June 1784)
- François de La Broue de Vareilles (25 June 1784 – 1815)
- Constitutional bishops:
  - Ignace de Cazeneuve
  - André Garnier

=== since 1801 ===
Nominated by the King:

Toussaint-Alphonse-Marie de Sinéty
Louis de Villeneuve-Bargemont

- François-Antoine Arbaud (16 May 1823 – 27 March 1836)
- Nicolas-Augustin de la Croix d'Azolette (19 May 1837 – 27 April 1840)
- Louis Rossat (14 December 1840 – 17 June 1844)
- Jean-Irénée Depéry (17 June 1844 – death 9 December 1861)
- Victor-Félix Bernadou (7 April 1862 – 12 July 1867)
- Aimé-Victor-François Guilbert (20 September 1867 – 2 September 1879)
- Marie-Ludovic Roche (22 September 1879 – death 6 October 1880)
- Jean-Baptiste-Marie-Simon Jacquenet (13 May 1881 – 27 May 1884)
- Louis-Joseph-Jean-Baptiste-Léon Gouzot (27 March 1884 – 26 May 1887)
- Jean-Alphonse Blanchet (26 May 1887 – death 18 May 1888)
- Prosper Amable Berthet (27 May 1889 – death 25 October 1914)
- Gabriel-Roch de Llobet (22 January 1915 – 16 January 1925)
- Jules-Géraud Saliège (29 October 1925 – 17 December 1928)
- Camille Pic (17 December 1928 – 16 August 1932)
- Auguste-Callixte-Jean Bonnabel (16 August 1932 – retired 13 February 1961)
- Georges Jacquot (13 February 1961 – 1 November 1966)
- Robert-Joseph Coffy (11 February 1967 – 15 June 1974)
- Pierre-Bertrand Chagué (18 January 1975 – death 1 October 1980)
- Raymond-Gaston-Joseph Séguy (14 October 1981 – 31 July 1987)
- Georges Lagrange 1988–2003, resigned in 2003
- Jean-Michel di Falco Léandri (18 November 2003 – 8 April 2017)
- Xavier Malle (8 April 2017 – ...)

== See also ==
- List of Catholic dioceses in France
- Catholic Church in France

== Sources and external links ==
=== Bibliography - Reference works ===
- Albanés, Joseph Hyacinthe; Ulysse Chevalier (1899). Gallia christiana novissima: Aix, Apt, Fréjus, Gap, Riez et Sisteron (in Latin). Montbéliard: Société anonyme d'imprimerie montbéliardaise.
- Gams, Pius Bonifatius (1873). Series episcoporum Ecclesiae catholicae: quotquot innotuerunt a beato Petro apostolo. Ratisbon: Typis et Sumptibus Georgii Josephi Manz. (Use with caution; obsolete)
- Eubel, Conradus, ed. (1913). Hierarchia catholica (in Latin). Vol. 1 (Tomus I) (second ed.). Münster: Libreria Regensbergiana. pp. 514–515.
- Eubel, Conradus, ed. (1914). Hierarchia catholica (in Latin). Vol. 2 (Tomus II) (second ed.). Münster: Libreria Regensbergiana.
- Eubel, Conradus; Gulik, Guilelmus, eds. (1923). Hierarchia catholica (in Latin). Vol. 3 (Tomus III) (second ed.). Münster: Libreria Regensbergiana.
- Gauchat, Patritius (Patrice) (1935). Hierarchia catholica (in Latin). Vol. IV (1592-1667). Münster: Libraria Regensbergiana.
- Ritzler, Remigius; Sefrin, Pirminus (1952). Hierarchia catholica medii et recentis aevi (in Latin). Vol. V (1667-1730). Patavii: Messagero di S. Antonio.
- Ritzler, Remigius; Sefrin, Pirminus (1958). Hierarchia catholica medii et recentis aevi (in Latin). Vol. VI (1730-1799). Patavii: Messagero di S. Antonio.
- Fisquet, Honoré Jean P. (1864). La France pontificale ... Gap (in French). Paris: E. Repos.
- Société bibliographique (France) (1907). L'épiscopat français depuis le Concordat jusqu'à la Séparation (1802-1905). Paris: Librairie des Saints-Pères.

=== Bibliography - Studies ===
- Jean, Armand (1891). Les évêques et les archevêques de France depuis 1682 jusqu'à 1801 (in French). Paris: A. Picard.
- Duchesne, Louis (1907). Fastes épiscopaux de l'ancienne Gaule: I. Provinces du Sud-Est. Paris: Fontemoing. pp. 285–286. second edition (in French)
- Roman, Joseph (1870). Sigillographie du diocèse de Gap (in French). Paris: Rollin et Feuardent.
- Roman, Joseph (1873). Sigillographie du diocèse d'Embrun (in French). Paris: Rollin et Feuardent.

=== External links ===
- GCatholic - data for all sections
- (in French) Centre national des Archives de l'Église de France, L'Épiscopat francais depuis 1919, retrieved: 2016-12-24.
- -Hierarchy.org. David M. Cheney. Retrieved February 29, 2016
