= Ferdinand-François-Auguste Donnet =

French cardinal

His Eminence Ferdinand-François-Auguste Donnet
- Archbishop of Bordeaux
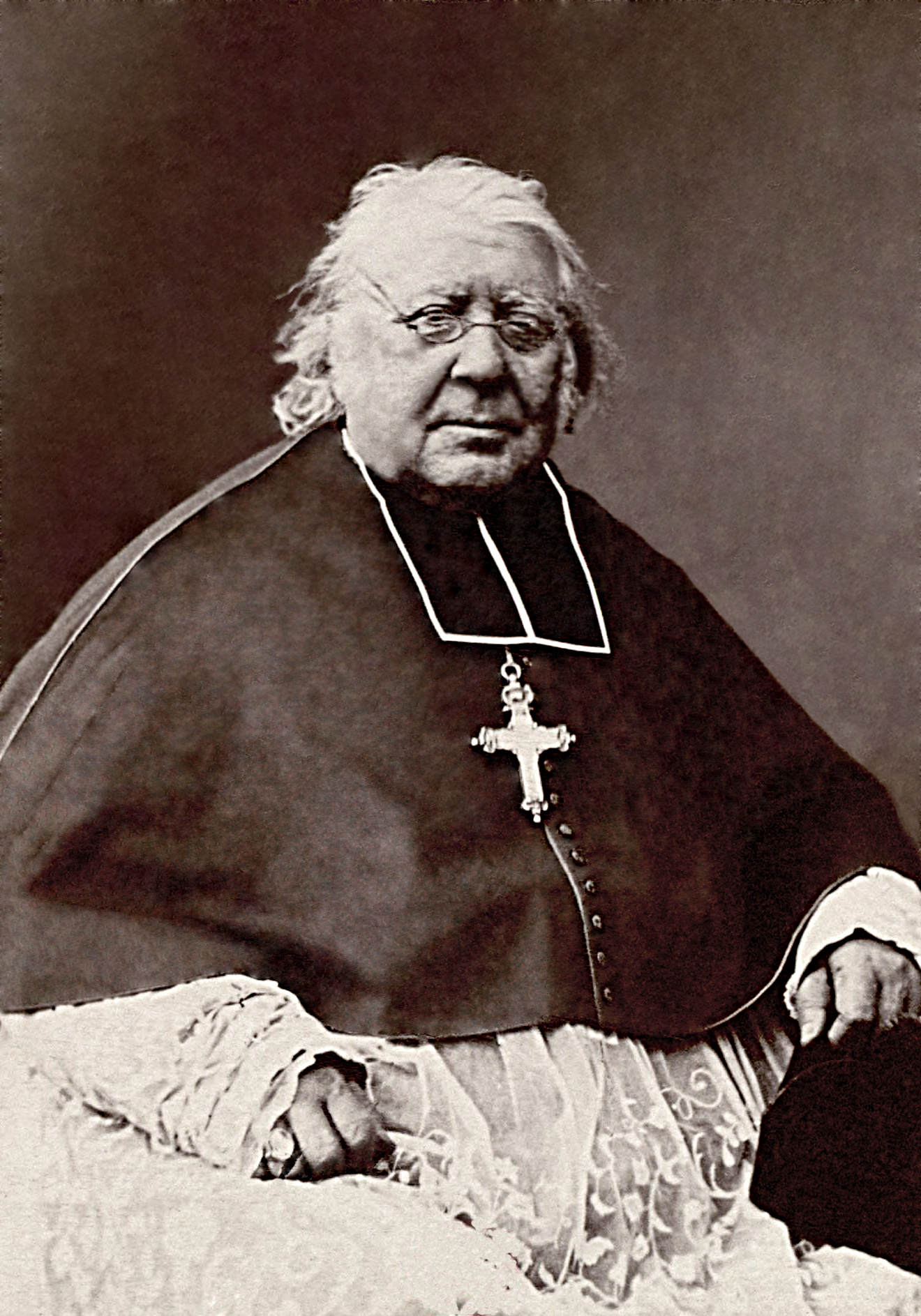
- Donnet circa 1880.
- Church: Roman Catholic Church
- Archdiocese: Bordeaux
- See: Bordeaux
- Appointed: 19 May 1837
- Term ended: 23 December 1882
- Predecessor: Jean-Louis Anne-Magdalen Lefebvre de Cheverus
- Successor: Aimé-Victor-François Guilbert
- Other post: Cardinal-Priest of Santa Maria in Via (1853–82)
- Previous posts: Titular Bishop of Rhosus (1835–37); Coadjutor Bishop of Nancy (1835–37)

Orders
- Ordination: 7 March 1819
- Consecration: 31 May 1835 by Charles Auguste Marie Joseph, Count of Forbin-Janson
- Created cardinal: 15 March 1852 by Pope Pius IX
- Rank: Cardinal-Priest

Personal details
- Born: Ferdinand-François-Auguste Donnet; 16 November 1795 Bourg-Argental, French First Republic
- Died: 23 December 1882 (aged 87) Bordeaux, French Third Republic
- Buried: Bordeaux Cathedral
- Parents: François Donnet; Madeleine Reynaud
- Motto: Ad fortiter finem suaviter Omnia
- Coat of arms

Styles of Ferdinand-François-Auguste Donnet
- Reference style: His Eminence
- Spoken style: Your Eminence
- Informal style: Cardinal
- See: Bordeaux

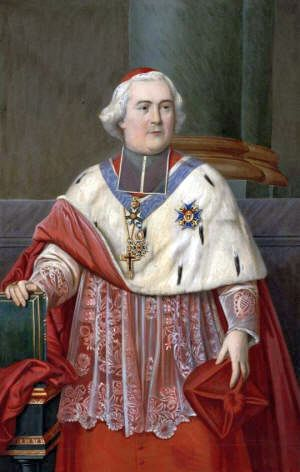
Cardinal Donnet.

Ferdinand-François-Auguste Donnet (French pronunciation: [fɛʁdinɑ̃ fʁɑ̃swa oɡyst dɔnɛ]; 16 November 1795 – 23 December 1882) was a French Catholic prelate who served as Archbishop of Bordeaux from 1837 until his death. He was elevated to the cardinalate in 1852.

== Life ==
His ecclesiastical province corresponded broadly with the Roman Aquitania Secunda (including Poitiers) but also included the French Antilles. Donnet argued forcefully for the canonisation of Christopher Columbus. Earlier he had been titular bishop of Rhosus appointed to the diocese of Nancy and Toul. A major figure in Napoleon III's Liberal Empire period he was renowned for his energy, e.g. in publishing and in the restoration of churches in his diocese of Bordeaux (including Bazas though without that title). Donnet was named cardinal by pope Pius IX in 1852 and participated in the conclave of 1878. Eleven volumes of his pastoral instructions, sermons and writings were posthumously published.

Records
Preceded by Prospero Caterini	Oldest living Member of the Sacred College; 3 January 1881 – 28 October 1881	Succeeded by John Henry Newman, C.O.
