= Adolphe Perraud =

French Cardinal and academician

His Eminence Adolphe Perraud C.O.
- Bishop of Autun
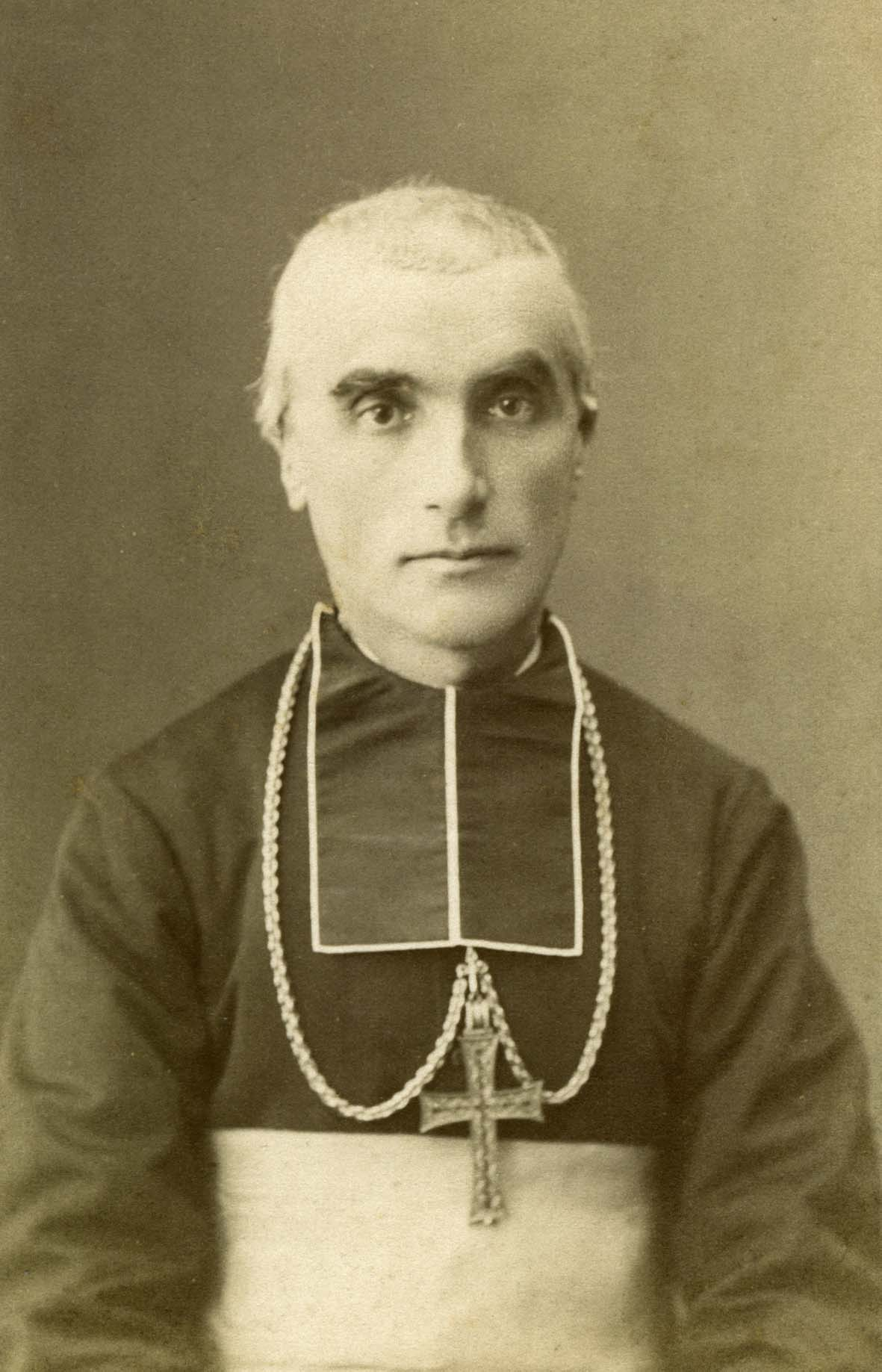
- Perraud in 1880.
- Church: Roman Catholic Church
- Diocese: Autun
- See: Autun
- Appointed: 4 May 1874
- Installed: 9 July 1874
- Term ended: 10 February 1906
- Predecessor: Léopold-René Leséleuc de Kerouara
- Successor: Henri-Raymond Villard
- Other post: Cardinal-Priest of San Pietro in Vincoli (1896-1906)
- Previous post: Superior General of the Oratory of France (1884-1901)

Orders
- Ordination: 2 June 1854
- Consecration: 29 June 1874 by Joseph-Hippolyte Guibert
- Created cardinal: 16 January 1893 in pectore 29 November 1895 revealed by Pope Leo XIII
- Rank: Cardinal-Priest

Personal details
- Born: Adolphe-Louis-Albert Perraud; 7 February 1828 Lyon, French Kingdom
- Died: 10 February 1906 (aged 78) Autun, French Third Republic
- Parents: Marie Léopold Perraud; Aglaé Virginie de La Métherie
- Motto: Pax justitiae honor pietatis
- Coat of arms

Adolphe Louis Albert Perraud (7 February 1828 – 10 February 1906) was a French Cardinal and academician.

== Biography ==
Perraud was born in Lyon to Leopold Perraud and Aglae Delametherie. A brilliant student at the lycées Henri IV and St Louis, he entered the École Normale, where he was strongly influenced by Joseph Gratry. In 1850 he secured the fellowship of history and for two years he taught at the lycée of Angers. In 1852 he abandoned teaching to become a priest. He returned to Paris where he joined the Oratory, which was then being reorganized by Gratry and Abbé Pététot, curé of St Roch.

On his ordination in 1855, after a sojourn at Rome, he was appointed professor of history and prefect of religion at the "petit seminaire" of St. Lô which had just been confided to the Oratory. At the same time he devoted himself to preaching, for which purpose he was recalled to Paris.

In 1860 he visited Ireland, after which he wrote Contemporary Ireland (1862). In 1865 he defended a theological thesis at the Sorbonne, where in 1866 he became professor of ecclesiastical history and dealt brilliantly with the history of Protestantism. He was appointed (1870) by Émile Ollivier, a member of the Committee of Higher Education.

In 1870 he was a chaplain in Marshal MacMahon's army, and after the war preached at the churches of St Philippe du Roule and of St Augustine in Paris. Made Bishop of Autun in 1874 despite his liberal tendencies, he interested himself especially in working-men. After the catastrophe of Montceau les mines, in which 22 miners died, he preached the funeral sermon; he gave several Lenten courses in his cathedral and preached the funeral sermons of Cardinal Guibert, Cardinal Lavigerie, and Marshal MacMahon.

Perraud was actively concerned in the improvement of clerical studies. In this connection his sermon (1879) on "the Church and light" caused a great sensation; after the Congress of Brussels (1894) he was named honorary president of the Society for the Encouragement of Higher Studies among the Clergy. Elected to the Académie française in 1882 to replace Henri Auguste Barbier, in 1885 he welcomed Victor Duruy and in 1889 delivered the discourse on the prizes of virtue.

Having been superior-general of the Oratory from 1884, he resigned in 1901 in order not to sign the request for authorization of his congregation. He was created cardinal in petto on January 16, 1893, the creation being published at the Consistory of 1895. He attended the conclave of 1903 and energetically opposed the movement of exclusion directed against Rampolla by Puczina, Archbishop of Cracow, in the name of the Austrian Government.

Perraud's works consist of the Études sur l'Irlande contemporaine (Paris, 1862); L'Oratoire de France au XVIIe siècle (1865); Paroles de l'heure présente (Words for the present time) (1872); Le Cardinal de Richelieu (1872); and a number of oratorical works.

== See also ==
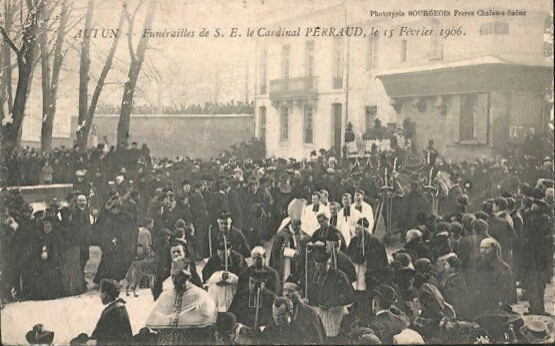
Funeral procession of Cardinal Perraud.

- Our Lady of La Salette
