= Armand-François Le Bourgeois =

French Catholic bishop (1911-2005)

- Bishop of Autun
- See: Diocese of Autun
- Appointed: 5 June 1966
- Installed: 22 March 1966
- Term ended: 31 July 1987
- Predecessor: Lucien-Sidroine Lebrun
- Successor: Raymond Séguy

Orders
- Ordination: 17 March 1934

Personal details
- Born: 11 February 1911 Annecy, France
- Died: 2 February 2005 (aged 93) Paris, France

Armand-François Le Bourgeois (1911–2005) was bishop of Autun in central France from 1966 until his retirement in 1987. The last bishop of Autun to wear the pallium, he was prominent in ecumenical relations. He chaired an episcopal committee that decided to offer communion in Catholic Churches to Anglicans who found themselves out of reach of their own church in France.
