= Stephen of Autun =

French liturgical writer and bishop

Stephen of Autun (? at Baugé, hence in Anjou – 1139 or early 1140 at the abbey of Cluny), surnamed Blagiacus or de Balgiaco, was a French liturgical writer and bishop of Autun.

== Life ==
Of his younger days nothing is known except that he was the son of Gaucerannus, lord of Baugé, and the uncle of Humbert, Archbishop of Lyon. He appears in history (1112) as Bishop of Autun. As such he was present (1115) at a synod of Tournus.

A letter is in existence of the year 1116, written to him from the Lateran by Pope Pascal II in which the pope places the Diocese of Autun under his special protection and confirms to Stephen various privileges. In 1129 Stephen was among the prelates who assisted at the coronation of Philip, eldest son of Louis VI of France.

He built a cathedral, beginning in 1120, which was solemnly consecrated (1131) by Pope Innocent II. He always showed a great admiration for the religious state, and in 1136 resigned his see and entered the monastery of Cluny. The abbot, Peter the Venerable, under whom he entered and died, praised his learning and piety.

== Works ==
His Tractatus de Sacramento Altaris is an ascetico-liturgical treatise, consisting of twenty chapters and a preface, in which he speaks of the ordination and duties of each of the Minor and Major Orders; and of the Holy Sacrifice of the Mass and gives a literal and allegorical explanation of the Canon. This treatise, published in 1517 by Montalon, canon of Autun, was ascribed by some to Stephen II of Autun (d. 1189), but is vindicated for the earlier bishop by Mabillon.
