= Gap Cathedral =

Church in Gap, France

Coordinates: 44°33′29″N 6°4′41″E

- French: Cathédrale Notre-Dame-et-Saint-Arnoux de Gap
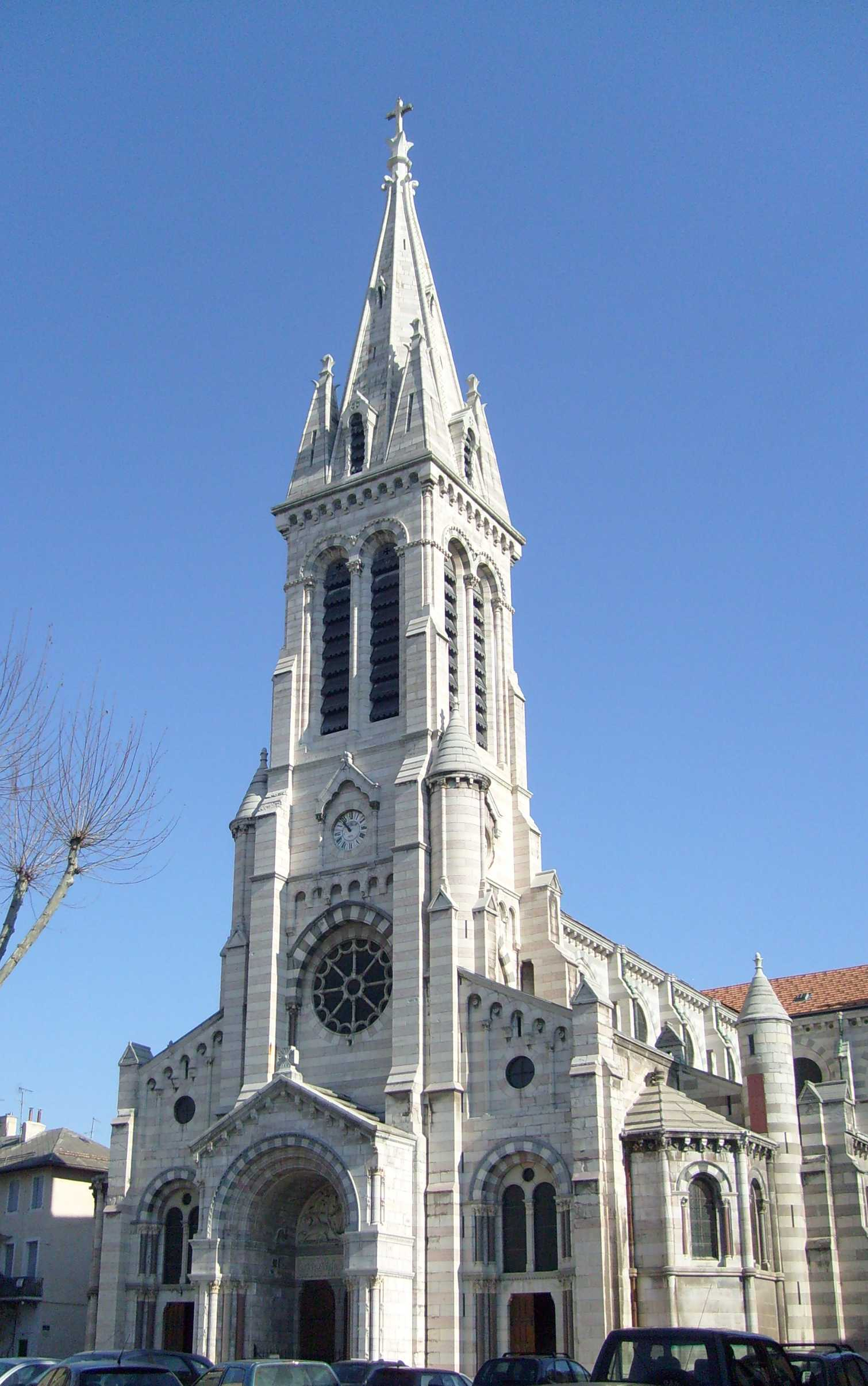
- Gap Cathedral
- Location: Gap, Hautes-Alpes, Provence-Alpes-Côte d'Azur
- Country: France
- Denomination: Catholic

History
- Status: Cathedral
- Dedication: Virgin Mary and Arnoux of Gap
- Consecrated: 21 September 1895

Architecture
- Functional status: active
- Architect: Charles Laisné
- Architectural type: church
- Style: Gothic Revival
- Years built: 1866–1904

Administration
- Diocese: Gap and Embrun

Monument historique
- Official name: Cathédrale Saint-Arnoux
- Type: classé
- Designated: 9 August 1906
- Reference no.: PA00080566

Gap Cathedral (French: Cathédrale Notre-Dame-et-Saint-Arnoux de Gap) is a Roman Catholic church located in the town of Gap, Hautes-Alpes, France. It is a national monument, and is the seat of the Bishop of Gap and Embrun.

== History ==
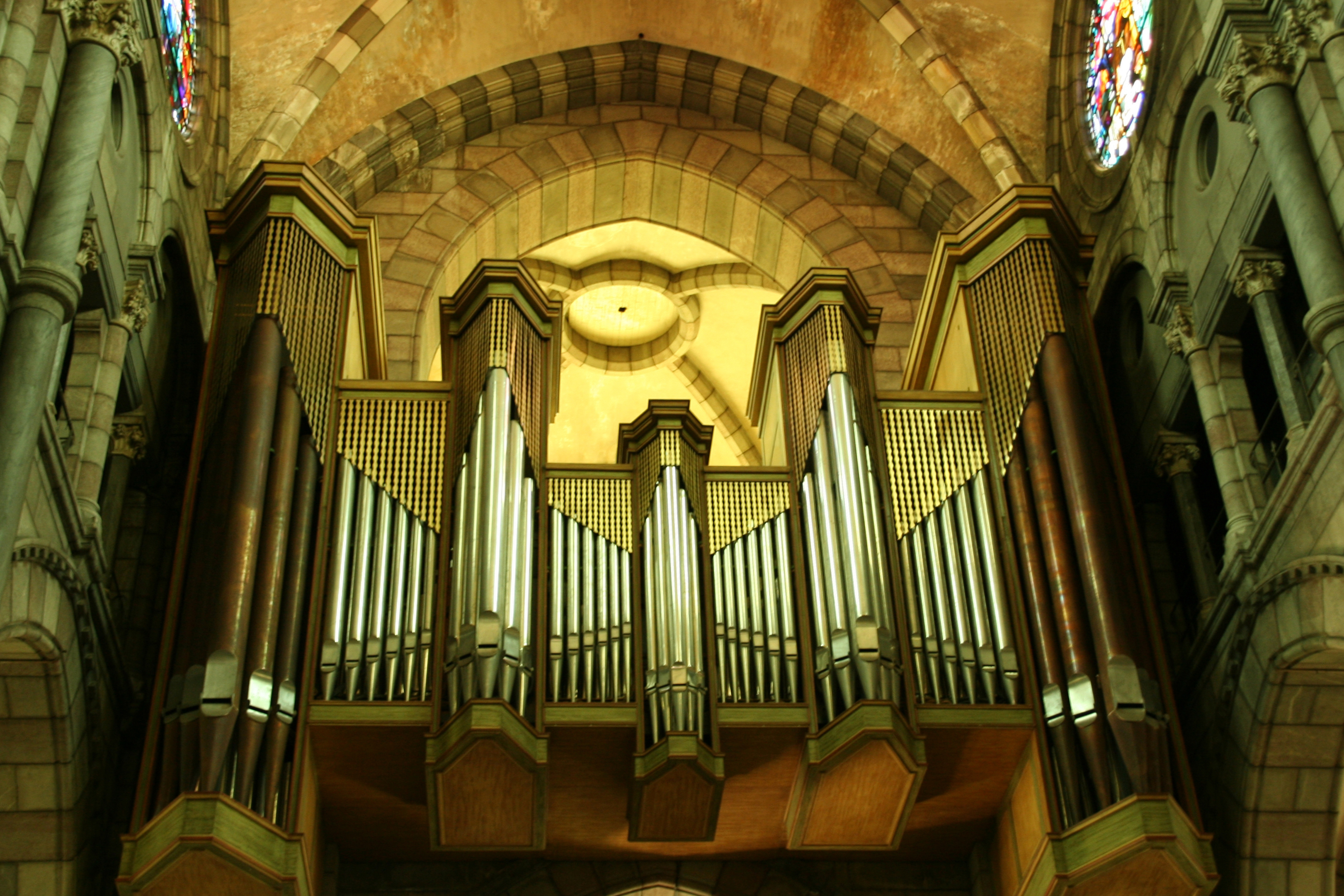
Gap Cathedral interior: organ

The original cathedral on the site was built around the 5th century on the ruins of a Roman temple to the God Apollo. Over the years several buildings stood at the same spot. The current cathedral was built between 1866 and 1904 in Neo-Gothic style by architect Charles Laisné on the site of the former cathedral of mediaeval origin which was then falling to ruin.

The architecture is heavily inspired by the nearby Embrun Cathedral.

The current bell tower stands at 70 metres (229 ft 8 in) high.

Consecrated on 21^{st} September 1895, the feast of Arnoux of Gap, who was Bishop of Gap during the 11^{th} century and is the patron saint of the Gap. The cathedral was designated as a Monument historique on 9^{th} August 1906.
