= Leontius of Autun =

Bishop of Autun

Saint Leontius of Autun
- Born: Leontius
- Residence: Autun, France
- Died: c. 430 AD; Autun, France
- Venerated in: Roman Catholic Church
- Feast: July 1
- Patronage: Autun, France

Saint Leontius of Autun (French:Saint Léonce) (d. ca. 430 AD) was a bishop of Autun in Gaul during the fifth century. He is mentioned in the Martyrologium Hieronymianum. He is sometimes confused with the similarly named Saint Leonorius (Saint Leonore, Lunaire) and Leontius of Fréjus who lived around the same time. He is venerated as a saint in the Catholic church, and his feast day is 1 July.

== Background ==
There are scant details of Leontius life before he entered the ministry, and almost no documentation. On 1 July, the Martyrologium Hieronymianum has the following listing, "The burial of Leontius, bishop of Autun (Gaul), 5th cent." The chronotaxis of the bishops of Autun show that he was the eighth bishop, serving after Evantius and before Euphronius.

It is believed he was born in Autun, entered the ministry and that he was the bishop of the Diocese of Autun in the 5th century. The diocese comprises what is now the French department of Saone et Loire, in the region of Bourgogne. He was a respected leader within the religious community of Gaul.

Leontius died circa 430 in Autun, and was elevated to sainthood pre-congregation. At the time of his death he was considered a confessor, and it was not uncommon for one who led a virtuous life who had died peacefully to be venerated as a saint. More than likely, he was elevated to sainthood by the local bishop. His cult spread throughout the region of Gaul where he lived, and he became a patron saint of Autun.

The French commune, Saint-Lieux-Lafenasse, is named after him (Languedocien: Sant Lionçe La Fenassa).

== See also ==
- Autun Cathedral
