= Jean-Louis Gouttes =

French political figure

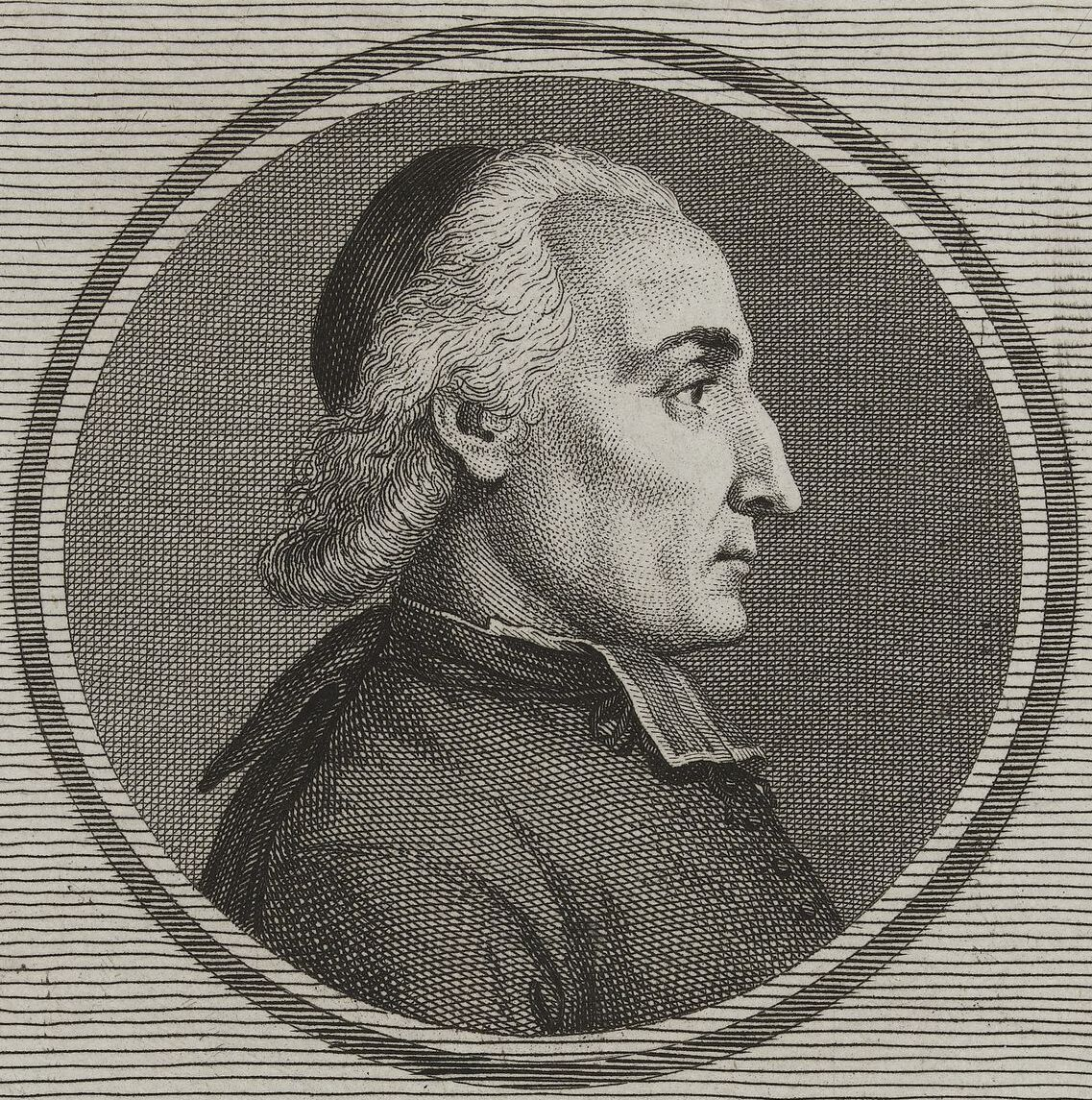
Jean-Louis Gouttes

Jean-Louis Gouttes (21 December 1739 (Note: The Dictionnaire des parlementaires gives his date of birth as 21 September. However, Charmasse, who transcribes the baptismal record, and Lemay both give 21 December 1739. The parish register of Saint-Julien de Tulle records his baptism on 22 December 1739.) – 7 March 1794) was a French cleric and statesman of the Revolution.

== Biography ==
Born in Tulle, in Limousin, he joined a regiment of dragoons as a young man before becoming a priest.

Curé of a parish near Bordeaux, then of Argilliers in the Franche-Comté, he was one of the leaders of the lower clergy of his diocese, demanding higher salaries for the impoverished parish priest.

He was elected (27 March 1789) by the sénéchaussée of Béziers in Languedoc, to the First Estate of the Estates General, with 185 votes out of 311. He served a term as president of the National Constituent Assembly 29 April to 8 May 1790.

In 1791, he was consecrated as Constitutional bishop of Saône-et-Loire to replace Talleyrand, who had resigned from the position he held under the Ancien Régime as Bishop of Autun. On 3 September, he was elected administrator of the département.

Having protested against dechristianisation and against the Reign of Terror, he was arrested by decree of the Committee of Public Safety. Sentenced to death on 6 Germinal Year II, he was guillotined the next day, 7 March 1794.
