= Moduin =

9th-century Frankish churchman and Latin poet of the Carolingian Renaissance

Moduin, Modoin, or Mautwin (Latin: Moduinus, Modoinus, c.770–840/3) was a Frankish churchman and Latin poet of the Carolingian Renaissance. He was a close friend of Theodulf of Orléans, a contemporary and courtier of the emperors Charlemagne and Louis the Pious, and a member of the Palatine Academy. In signing his own poems he used the pen name Naso in reference to the cognomen of Ovid. From 815 (or earlier) until his death he was the Bishop of Autun.

== Ecclesiastical career ==
Moduin's early career in the church was spent at Saint-Georges in Lyon. He is first recorded in the diocese of Autun in 815, but it is not certain when he was elected or consecrated. He supported Louis the Pious and Charles the Bald during the civil wars of the 830s. After the deposition of Agobard at the Synod of Thionville in 835, Moduin took over many of the responsibilities of the Archbishop of Lyon. It was during his administration of Lyon that Florus accused him of mistreating the clergy.

Moduin may also have been the abbot of Moutiers-Saint-Jean in the Diocese of Langres.

== Literature ==
Moduin was a court poet and as such his two surviving verses are secular. He is notable for his praise of Charlemagne and he has been called his panegyrist. Moduin's poem to Theodulf and especially his Egloga were a major influence on the later Carolingian poet Ermoldus Nigellus. Even Moduin's more famous contemporary Alcuin of York, quotes Moduin in his En tuus Albinus.

The two books of Moduin's Egloga, about the value of poetry, are traditionally dated to 804–10, before the poem Karolus Magnus et Leo Papa usually attributed to Einhard. The Egloga are modelled after the eclogues of Virgil and Calpurnius and likewise designed as a vehicle for praising the emperor, the Augustus. The poem is a lively debate between two unnamed men—a young poet, the puer, and an old poet, the senex—that mirrors Virgil's Tityrus and Meliboeus. The identification of the young poet with Moduin himself is purely speculative.

The first book begins with the youth's unsophisticated attempts to praise his older counterpart and to laud the "rebirth of 'golden Rome'". This last attempt has been often misread as a "manifesto of the Carolingian Renaissance", but in fact the senex ridicules it. It contains, nonetheless, some of the most explicit "renaissance" imagery of the period: Aurea Roma iterum renovata renascitur orbi ("Golden Rome is reborn and restored anew to the world!"). Peter Godman writes that with conclusion of the first book of Moduin's Egloga "Carolingian poetry achieves a new self-awareness."

Moduin's other poem, less impressive than the first and less "expertly written", was composed to comfort Theodulf when the latter was in exile; this after Theodulf had written him a letter describing the political dissension then racking the empire in terms of a bird allegory borrowed from his earlier poetry. Moduin eventually advises Theodulf to throw himself on "Caesar's" (i.e. Charlemagne's) mercy.

== Sources ==
- McKitterick, Rosamond (1994). Carolingian Culture: Emulation and Innovation. Cambridge: Cambridge University Press. ISBN 0-521-40586-6.
- Schaller, D. "Das Aachener Epos für Karl der Kaiser," Studien zur lateinischen Dichtung des Frühmittelalters, pp. 129–65.
- Stella, Francesco (1995). Poesia carolingia. Florence: Le Lettere, pp. 105, 128–35, 386–90.
- Stella, Francesco (2004). "Autor und Zuschreibungen des sog. Karolus Magnus et Leo papa," Nova de veteribus. Festschrift P. G. Schmidt. Berlin: de Gruyter, pp. 155–75.
- Tilliette, Jean-Yves (2002). "Poésie latine profane," Dictionnaire du Moyen Âge, Claude Gauvard, Alain de Libera, and Michel Zink, edd. PUF.
