= Diocese of Autun =

Catholic diocese in France

Coordinates: 46.95°N 4.30°E

Diocese of Autun (–Chalon-sur-Saône–Mâcon–Cluny) Dioecesis Augustodunensis (–Cabillonensis–Matisconensis–Cluniacensis) Diocèse d'Autun (–Chalon-sur-Saône–Mâcon–Cluny)

Catholic
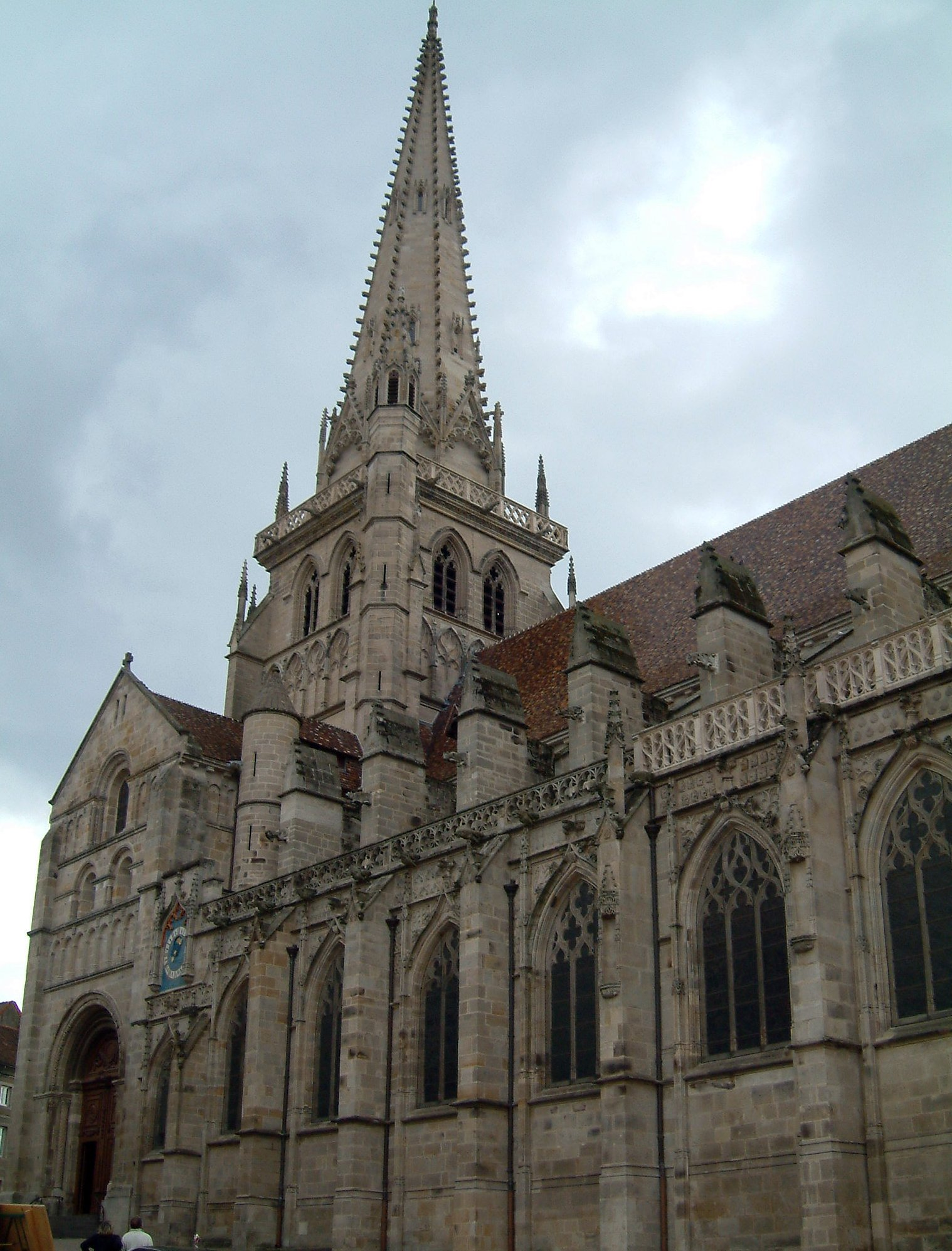
- Autun Cathedral

Location
- Country: France
- Ecclesiastical province: Dijon
- Metropolitan: Archdiocese of Dijon

Statistics
- Area: 8,575 km^{2} (3,311 sq mi)
- Population: Total; Catholics: (as of 2022); 574,229; 547,000 (95.3%)
- Parishes: 48

Information
- Denomination: Catholic
- Sui iuris church: Latin Church
- Rite: Roman Rite
- Established: 3rd Century (as Diocese of Autun); United: 15 December 1962
- Cathedral: Cathedral of St. Lazarus in Autun
- Patron saint: St. Lazarus of Bethany
- Secular priests: 124 (Diocesan); 6 (Religious Orders); 33 Permanent Deacons

Current leadership
- Pope: Leo XIV
- Bishop: Benoît Rivière
- Metropolitan Archbishop: Antoine Hérouard

Map

Website
- autun.catholique.fr

The Diocese of Autun (–Chalon-sur-Saône–Mâcon–Cluny) (Latin: Diocesis Aeduensis, Dioecesis Augustodunensis (–Cabillonensis–Matisconensis–Cluniacensis); French: Diocèse d'Autun (–Chalon-sur-Saône–Mâcon–Cluny)), more simply known as the Diocese of Autun, is a Latin Church diocese of the Catholic Church in France. The diocese comprises the entire Department of Saone et Loire, in the Region of Bourgogne.

The diocese was suffragan to the Archdiocese of Lyon under the Ancien Régime, and the Bishop of Autun held the post of Vicar of the Archbishop. The bishopric of Chalon-sur-Saône (since Roman times) and (early medieval) bishopric of Mâcon, also suffragans of Lyon, were united to Autun after the French Revolution by the Concordat signed by First Consul Napoleon Bonaparte and Pope Pius VII. For a short time, from 1802 to 1822, the enlarged diocese of Autun was suffragan to the Archbishop of Besançon. In 1822, however, Autun was again subject to the Archbishop of Lyon. The diocese of Autun is now, since 8 December 2002, suffragan to the Archbishop of Dijon. The current bishop of Autun is Benoît Rivière.

== History ==
Christian teaching reached Autun at a very early period, as is known from a funeral inscription, in classical Greek, of a certain Pectorius which dates from the 3rd century.

Local recensions of the "Passion" of St. Symphorianus of Autun tell the story that, on the eve of the persecution of Septimius Severus, St. Polycarp assigned to Irenaeus two priests and a deacon (Benignus, Andochius and Thyrsus), all three of whom departed for Autun. St. Benignus went on to Langres, while the others remained at Autun. According to this legendary cycle, which dates from about the first half of the 6th century, it was not then believed at Autun that the city was an episcopal see in the time of St. Irenaeus (c. 140–211).

Another tradition current at Autun, however, names St. Amator as its first bishop and places his episcopacy about 250. The first bishop known to history, however, is Reticius, an ecclesiastical writer and contemporary of the Emperor Constantine I (306–337).

=== Early bishops ===
Euphronius, who became Bishop of Autun, is credited with the foundation of the first monastic house at Autun in 421, the Priory of S. Symphorien. In 1792 and 1793 the buildings were sold for the stone material and demolished. In 1993 the remains were classified as an historical monument by the French Government. In 452, Bishop Euphronius observed a comet, and sent a description of the event to Count Agrippinus, Magister Militum. Bishop Euphronius and Bishop Patiens were highly praised by Sidonius Apollinaris, son-in-law of the Emperor Avitus and Bishop of Clermont Ferrand, for conducting the election of a bishop of Chalons in a particularly upright fashion, without simony, aristocratic favoritism, or submission to the popular will. In 472 Bishop Sidonius invited Bishop Euphronius to Bourges for the election of Sidonius' Metropolitan.

Beginning in 599, the Bishop of Autun enjoyed until the late 20th century the right of wearing the pallium of a metropolitan bishop, in virtue of a privilege granted to Bishop Syagrius and his See by Pope Gregory I (590–604). Autun was to be a metropolis throughout its own locality, with second place in Gaul after Lugdunum. Gregory was very eager to have a church council in France to stamp out the vice of simony, and he appealed to Queen Brunhilda to use her influence to organize it; he especially recommended Bishop Syagrius of Autun to the Queen as his most reliable agent.

During the Merovingian era Autun was a politically important diocese. Two Bishops figured prominently in political affairs: Syagrius of Autun, bishop during the second half of the 6th century, a contemporary of Germanus, bishop of Paris, who was a native of Autun; and Leodegar (St. Léger), bishop from 663 to 680, who came into conflict with Ebroin, Mayor of the Palace of Neustria, and was put to death by order of Theoderic III.

The Abbey of St. Martin was founded in 602 by Queen Brunhilda of Austrasia, and it was there that her remains were interred – the deposed monarch having been repeatedly racked for three days, torn apart by four horses, and then burnt on a pyre. By the mid-tenth century, however, the abbey was no longer in operation. In 949 the Burgundian Counts Giselbert and Hugh imported monks from Cluny to reform the moribund monastery, and to elect their own abbot. When the abbey was destroyed in 1793, Brunhilda's sarcophagus was removed, and it is now in the Musée Lapidaire in Avignon.

=== Councils of Autun ===
The first council was held in 663, 670, or 677, under Bishop Leodegarius, for the purpose of regulating the discipline of the Benedictine monasteries. Monks were forbidden to have 'special friends' (compatres), or to have woman friends, or to be about in towns. The council ordered all ecclesiastics to learn by heart the Apostles Creed and the Athanasian Creed. This seems to be the earliest mention of the Athanasian Creed in France. The 19th century Benedictine Cardinal Pitra says in his "Histoire de St. Léger" that this canon may have been directed against Monothelitism, then seeking entrance into the Gallican churches, but already condemned in the Athenasian Creed. The Rule of St. Benedict was also prescribed as the normal monastic code.

In a Council of 1065, Saint Hugh, Abbot of Cluny, along with four bishops, accomplished the reconciliation of Robert I, Duke of Burgundy, with Hagano the Bishop of Autun.

In 1077 Hugues, Bishop of Die held a council at Autun, by order of Pope Gregory VII. The council deposed Manasses, Archbishop of Reims, for simony and usurpation of the see, and reproved other bishops for absence from the council. In 1094 Hugues, by then Archbishop of Lyon, and thirty-three other bishops meeting at Autun renewed the excommunication of Holy Roman Emperor Henry IV, the Antipope Guibert and their partisans, and also that of King Philip of France, guilty of bigamy. Simony, ecclesiastical disorders, and monastic usurpations provoked other decrees, only one of which is extant, forbidding the monks to induce the canons to enter monasteries.

There was also a Council in Autun in October 1094.

In the 1150s a quarrel over jurisdiction and independence broke out between Bishop Henri de Bourgogne of Autun and Abbot Reginald of Flavigny. The quarrel became so serious that it reached the royal court, and continued there for some time. Finally, in 1160, King Louis VII ruled that his predecessors had infeudated the Bishops of Autun with the lands of Flavigny, and that the Abbot of Flavigny was subinfeudated to the Bishops of Autun. The ruling scarcely settled the quarrel, however, which dragged on throughout the rest of the century, requiring repeated royal intervention; conflicts appear repeatedly in the thirteenth century as well.

Following the beginning of the Great Schism in 1378, the bishops of Autun were appointed, as they had been throughout the fourteenth century, by the Avignon pope, now Clement VII. After the Concordat of 1516 between Francis I and Leo X, however, the King of France held the right to appoint bishops in France, with the consent of the pope. This arrangement persisted until the French Revolution.

Gabriel de Roquette was bishop from 1666 till 1702, through most of the reign of Louis XIV. According to the Duc de Saint-Simon, he was the model for the character "Tartuffe" in Molière's play Tartuffe.

The devotion to the Sacred Heart originated in the Visitation Convent at Paray-le-Monial, founded in 1644, and now the object of frequent pilgrimages. Its promoter was Sister Margaret Mary Alacoque, a cloistered nun who claimed to have visions between 1673 and 1675, in which Jesus personally taught her the devotion.

=== Revolution and aftermath ===
Much later, Charles Maurice de Talleyrand-Périgord, the future diplomat, Foreign Minister, and Prince of Benevento, was Bishop of Autun from 1788 to 1791. He participated in the Fête de la Fédération in Paris on 14 July 1790, and celebrated a pontifical Mass as bishop. On 27 December 1790 he took the oath to the Civil Constitution of the Clergy, and notified his clergy in Autun of the fact on 29 December, with the recommendation that they do the same. He was elected Constitutional Bishop of Saône-et-Loire, but, eager to avoid further trouble, he himself resigned the Constitutional bishopric in January 1791. But as to the Diocese of Autun of the Ancien Régime, that resignation required papal permission, and Pope Pius VI obliged by dismissing Talleyrand as a schismatic in a bull of 13 April 1791. He continued to be a bishop, however, until Napoleon forced Pius VII to concede that the Bishop of Autun "might wear secular attire and serve the French Republic in an official capacity," something that Talleyrand had been doing anyway since 1790. The Pope, however, found no precedent in church history for a bishop being returned to the lay state, and refused to do so in 1801; Talleyrand was still a bishop when he died in 1838. As a bishop Talleyrand carried out the consecration of two Constitutional bishops on 24 February 1791, the bishops Louis Alexandre Expilly of the Aisne, and Claude Eustache François Marolles of Finistère. The ceremony took place in Paris at the Church of the Oratory, and Talleyrand was assisted by the titular bishops Miroudot du Bourg of Babylon and Gobel of Lyda. The consecrations were illicit but valid, and on 13 April 1791 a papal bull deprived Talleyrand of his faculties and threatened excommunication.

As soon as Talleyrand resigned, the voters of the new Constitutional diocese of Saône-et-Loire elected a new bishop, Jean-Louis Gouttes. He had been a priest of the Roman Catholic Church for twenty-three years. He had been a vicar in a parish near Bordeaux, then at Gros-Caillou, and obtained a chapel at Montaubon. He obtained his own parish at Argellieres in the diocese of Narbonne in 1785, though he was chosen as one of the deputies to the National Assembly from the diocese of Béziers in March 1789. He served on the finance committee, and was elected President of the National Assembly on 29 April 1790. On 14 June he oversaw the passage of Article 29 of the Constitution, which removed the power of instituting bishops from the hands of the Pope. On 15 February 1791 Abbé Gouttes was elected by an absolute majority of the representatives of the voters of Saône-et-Loire, meeting in Mâcon for the purpose of electing a new bishop in accordance with the Constitution of 1790. On 3 April 1791 he was consecrated at Notre Dame in Paris along with four other Constitutional bishops by Constitutional Bishops Lamourette (Rhône-et-Loire), Périer (Puy-de-Dôme), and Prudhomme (Sarthe). On 7 January 1794, however, Gouttes was arrested as a counter-revolutionary and crypto-royalist, and sent to Paris. He spent several months in prison, was tried on orders of the Committee of Public Safety, and sent to the guillotine on 26 March 1794.

=== Restoration ===
The diocese of Autun was without a bishop of any complexion until Napoleon came to power and decided that, for the sake of French unity and his own plans, peace had to be arranged with the Papacy. In 1801, under the new Concordat, Pius VII reorganized the episcopal structure of France and suppressed the bishopric of Mâcon. Bishop Gabriel-François Moreau, who had been Bishop of Macon but who had emigrated during the Revolution, was appointed Bishop of Autun on 20 July 1802. He died on 8 September 1802 at the age of eighty. The office of Archdeacon of Mâcon continued to exist, but its holder now belonged to the diocese of Autun, and was made a Canon of the Cathedral of Saint-Lazare. The Archdeaconries of Autun and of Châlons were combined into one office.

In 1874 Adolphe-Louis-Albert Perraud was named Bishop of Autun, having previously been Professor of Ecclesiastical History at the Sorbonne. He was elected a member of the French Academy in 1882, and named a Cardinal by Pope Leo XIII in 1893 though the fact was not made public until 1895. He died in 1906.

In the Diocese of Autun are still to be seen the remains of the Benedictine Abbey of Tournus and the Abbey of Cluny, to which 2,000 monasteries were subject.

Pope Gelasius II (1118–1119) died at Cluny, and therefore Cluny was the site of the Conclave that elected Pope Calixtus II (1119–1124).

On 15 December 1962, Pope John XXIII gave the Consistorial Congregation authority, with the consent of the Abbot Primate of the Benedictine Order, to grant the title of the defunct territorial Abbey of Cluny to the Bishop of Autun.

== Bishops ==
=== To 1000 ===
[c. 270: Amator (I)]
[c. 273: Martin (I)]
[c. 273: Reverianus]

- c. 310–334: Reticius
- 355: Cassian of Autun
- c. 374: Hegemonius
- c. 420: Simplicius of Autun
- Evantius
- Leontius of Autun
- c. 450–490:Euphronius of Autun
- c. 495: Flavianus
- c. 517: Pragmatius of Autun
- Proculus (I)
- Valeolus
- Proculus (II)
- c. 533–538: Agrippinus
- 540–549: Nectarius of Autun
- Eupard
- 560: Rémi or Bénigne
- c. 560–600: Syagrius of Autun
- Le(i)fastus ?
- Flavianus
- 614 : Rocco
- 625–630 : Auspicius
- c. 657: Ferréolus
- 659–678: Leodegar
- c. 678–c. 690: Hermenarius
- 692: Ansbert
- c. 732: Vascon
- Amatre (II)
- c. 744: Morannus
- c. 755: Gairon
- 762: Hiddo
- Rainaud
- Martin (II)
- Alderic of Autun
- 815–c. 840: Modoin
- 840–842:Bernon or Bernhard
- c. 843: Alteus
- c. 850–865: Jonas
- c. 866–873: Liudo
- 875–893: Adalgarius
- c. 894–919: Gualo (Wallon) de Vergy
- c. 920–929: Hervée de Vergy
- 935–968: Rotmond
- c. 970–976: Gérard

=== 1000–1300 ===
- ca. 977–1024: Gautier (I)
- 1025–1055: Elmuin
- ca. 1055–1098: Hagano (Aganon)
- 1098–1112: Norgaud
- 1112–1140: Etienne de Baugé)
- 1140: Robert de Bourgogne
- 1140–1148: Humbert de Baugé
- 1148–1170 or 1171: Henri de Bourgogne
- 1171–1189: Etienne (II)
- 1189–1223: Gautier (II)
- 1224–1245: Guy de Vergy
- 1245–1253: Anselin de Pomard
- 1253–1281: Girard de La Roche
- 1283–1286: Jacques de Beauvoir
- 1287–1298: Hugues d'Arcy

=== 1300–1500 ===
- 1299–1308: Barthélémy
- 1309–1322: Elie Guidonis
- 1322–1331: Pierre Bertrand
- 1331–1343: Jean I d'Arcy
- 1343–1345: Guillaume d'Auxonne
- 1345–1351: Guy de La Chaume
- 1351–1358: Guillaume de Thurey
- 1358–1361: Renaud de Maubernard
- 1361–1377: Geoffroi David or Pauteix
- 1377–1379: Pierre Raimundi de Barrière Mirepoix
- 1379–1387: Guillaume de Vienne, O.S.B. (Avignon Obedience)
- 1387–1400: Nicolas de Coulon (Avignon Obedience)
- 1401–1414: Milon de Grancey
- 1419–1436: Frédéric de Grancey
- 1436–1483: Cardinal Jean Rolin

=== 1500–1800 ===
- 1490–1500: Antoine de Chalon
- 1500–1501: Joannes Rolin
- 1501–1503: Louis d'Amboise
- 1503–1505: Philippe de Clèves Administrator
- 1505–1546: Jacques Hurault de Cheverny
- 1548–1550: Ippolito II d'Este
- 1550–1557: Philibert Dugny de Courgengoux, O.S.B.
- 1558–1572: Pierre de Marcilly
- 1585: Charles d'Ailleboust
- 1588–1612: Pierre Saunier
- 1621–1652: Claude de la Magdelaine
- 1653–1664: Louis Dony d'Attichy, O.Minim.
- 1666–1702: Gabriel de Roquette
- 1702–1709: Bernard de Senaux
- 1710–1721: Charles Andrault de Maulévrier-Langeron
- 1721–1724: Charles-François d'Hallencourt de Dromesnil
- 1724–1732: Antoine-François de Bliterswick
- 1732–1748: Gaspard de Thomas de La Valette
- 1748–1758: Antoine de Malvin de Montazet
- 1758–1767: Nicolas de Bouillé
- 1767–1788: Yves-Alexandre de Marbeuf
- 1788–1791: Charles-Maurice de Talleyrand-Périgord

Constitutional Church (schismatic)
April 1791 – 1793: Jean-Louis Gouttes (Constitutional Bishop)
1801: Thomas-Juste Poullard

=== From 1800 ===
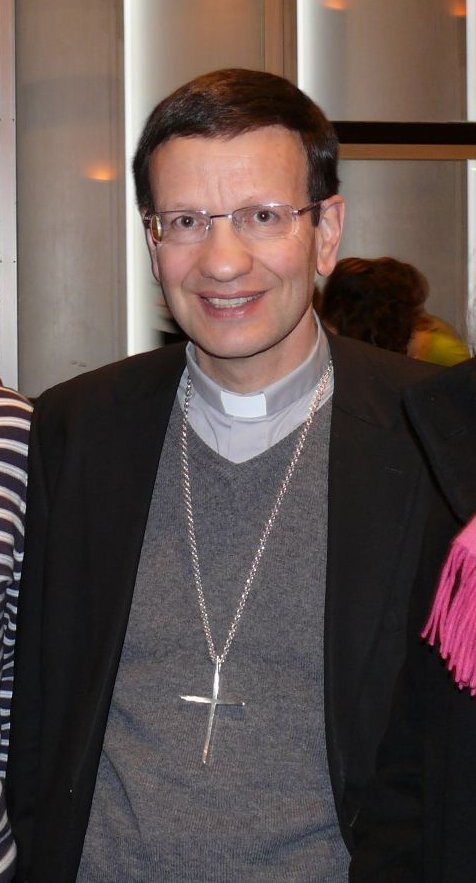
Bishop Rivière

- 1802 : Gabriel-François Moreau
- 1802–1806: François de Fontanges (with the title Archbishop)
- 1806–1819: Fabien-Sébastien Imberties
- 1819–1829: Roch-Etienne de Vichy
- 1829–1851: Bénigne-Urbain-Jean-Marie du Trousset d'Héricourt
- 1851–1872: Frédéric-Gabriel-Marie-François de Marguerye
- 1872–1873: Léopold-René Leséleuc de Kerouara
- 1874–1906: Adolphe-Louis-Albert Perraud (Cardinal, Superior General of the Oratory)
- 1906–1914: Henri-Raymond Villard
- 1915–1922: Désiré-Hyacinthe Berthoin
- 1922–1940: Hyacinthe-Jean Chassagnon
- 1940–1966: Lucien-Sidroine Lebrun (d. 1985)
- 1966–1987: Armand-François Le Bourgeois, C.I.M.
- 1987–2006: Raymond Gaston Joseph Séguy
- 2006–present Benoît Marie Pascal Rivière

== See also ==
- Catholic Church in France

== Bibliography ==
=== Reference books ===
- Gams, Pius Bonifatius (1873). Series episcoporum Ecclesiae catholicae: quotquot innotuerunt a beato Petro apostolo. Ratisbon: Typis et Sumptibus Georgii Josephi Manz.
- Eubel, Conradus, ed. (1913). Hierarchia catholica (in Latin). Vol. 1 (second ed.). Münster: Libreria Regensbergiana. pp. 72–73.
- Eubel, Conradus, ed. (1914). Hierarchia catholica. Vol. 2 (second ed.). Münster: Libreria Regensbergiana. pp. 80–81.
- Eubel, Conradus; Gulik, Guilelmus, eds. (1923). Hierarchia catholica. Vol. 3 (second ed.). Münster: Libreria Regensbergiana. pp. 95–96.
- Gauchat, Patritius (Patrice) (1935). Hierarchia catholica IV (1592-1667). Münster: Libraria Regensbergiana. p. 70.
- Ritzler, Remigius; Sefrin, Pirminus (1952). Hierarchia catholica medii et recentis aevi V (1667-1730). Patavii: Messagero di S. Antonio. p. 70.
- Ritzler, Remigius; Sefrin, Pirminus (1958). Hierarchia catholica medii et recentis aevi VI (1730-1799). Patavii: Messagero di S. Antonio. p. 67.
- Sainte-Marthe, Denis (1728). Gallia Christiana: In Provincias Ecclesiasticas Distributa... Provincia Lugdunensis (in Latin). Vol. IV. Paris: Typographia Regia. pp. 314–507.
- Pius VI (1821). Collectio bullarum, brevium, allocutionum, epistolarumque felicis recordationis PP. Pii VI, contrà constitutionem civilem cleri gallicani, ejusque authores et fautores: Item, concordatorum inter S.P. Pium VII, et gubernium reipublicae, in Galliis, atque alia varia regimina, postmodum in hac regione, sibi succedentia, etc (in Latin). London: Ex officina Cox et Baylis.
- Theiner, Augustin (1857). Documents inédits relatifs aux affaires religieuses de la France, 1790 à 1800: extraits des archives secrètes du Vatican (in French and Latin). Vol. Tome I. Paris: F. Didot Frères.
- Etat du diocèse d'Autun: au 1er janvier 1846 (in French). Autun: F. Dejussieu. 1846.
- Madignier, Jacques (ed.) (2010): Fasti Ecclesiae Gallicanae. Répertoire prosopographique des évêques, dignitaires et chanoines des diocèses de France de 1200 à 1500. XII. Diocèse d'Autun. Turnhout, Brepols.

=== Studies ===
- Bergin, Joseph (1996). The Making of the French Episcopate, 1589-1661. Yale University Press. ISBN 978-0-300-06751-4.
- Bulliot, Jacques G. (1849). Essai historique sur l'Abbaye de Saint-Martin d'Autun de l'ordre de Saint-Benoit: Par J.-Gabriel Bulliot (in French). Vol. 1. M. Déjussieu.
- Bulliot, Jacques Gabriel (1849). Essai historique sur l'abbaye de Saint-Martin d'Autun de l'ordre de Saint-Benoit: chartes et pièces justificatives (in French). Vol. 2. Autun: Dejussieu.
- Charmasse, A. de (1880). Cartulaire de l'évêché d'Autun connu sous le nom de cartulaire rouge publié d'après un manuscrit du XIIIe siècle: suivi d'une carte et d'un pouillé du diocèse d'Autun d'après un manuscrit du XIVe siècle (in French and Latin). Autun: Dejussieu père et fils.
- Fontenay, Harold de; Charmasse, Anatole de (1889). Autun et ses monuments (in French). Dijon: Dejussieu père et fils.
- Duchesne, Louis (1910). Fastes épiscopaux de l'ancienne Gaule: II. L'Aquitaine et les Lyonnaises (second ed.). Paris: Fontemoing.. Google copy.
- Gagnarre, (Abbé) (1774). Histoire de l'Eglise d'Autun (in French). Autun: P.-P. Dejussieu. p. 53.
- Lacombe, Bernard Mercier de (1903). Talleyrand: évêque d'Autun, d'après des documents inédits (in French) (second ed.). Paris: Perrin et cie.
- Pignot, J.-Henri (1876). Un évêque réformateur sous Louis XIV, Gabriel de Roquette, évêque d'Autun (in French). Paris: A. Durand et Pedone-Lauriel.
- Regnier, Jean (1988). Les évêques d'Autun (in French). Dijon: Impr. graphique de l'Ouest.
- Religious Establishment of the French Republic: being the Concordat ratified between the Pope and the French Government (10 Sept. 1801); with the official report of Citizen Portalis to the Legislative Body, etc. London: J. S. Jordan. 1802.
- Sévestre, Émile (1905). L'histoire, le texte et la destinée du Concordat de 1801 (in French) (second ed.). Paris: Lethielleux.
- Société bibliographique (France) (1907). L'épiscopat français depuis le Concordat jusqu'à la Séparation (1802-1905). Paris: Librairie des Saints-Pères.
