= Racho of Autun =

Roman Catholic bishop and Orthodox saint

Saint Racho (or Ragnobert) of Autun (died c. 660) is venerated as a Roman Catholic and an Orthodox saint. He was a bishop of Autun, with a feast day on 25 January.

He attended the Council of Paris on 10 October 614, and is listed as "Ex ciuitate Agustidunum Rocco episcopus."

A Cluniac priory, Saint-Racho-lès-Autun, under the protection of his name was established in southern Burgundy during the first flush of the Cluniac reform movement during the tenure of Odilon of Cluny (994–1049). The commune of Saint-Racho, Saône-et-Loire owes its historical origins to the monastery.

Racho holds a tenuous place in authentic history as the predecessor in the diocese of Autun of Leodegar, a fully historical figure who was the great opponent of Ebroin— the mayor of the Palace of Neustria— and the leader of the faction of Austrasian great nobles in the struggles for hegemony over the waning Merovingian dynasty. His torture and death made him a martyr and saint of the Roman Catholic Church and the Orthodox Church, which embraced the cause of the Austrasian mayors of the palace, the Arnulfings, in the following century, anointed as the Carolingian dynasty.
