= Laugnac =

- Commune
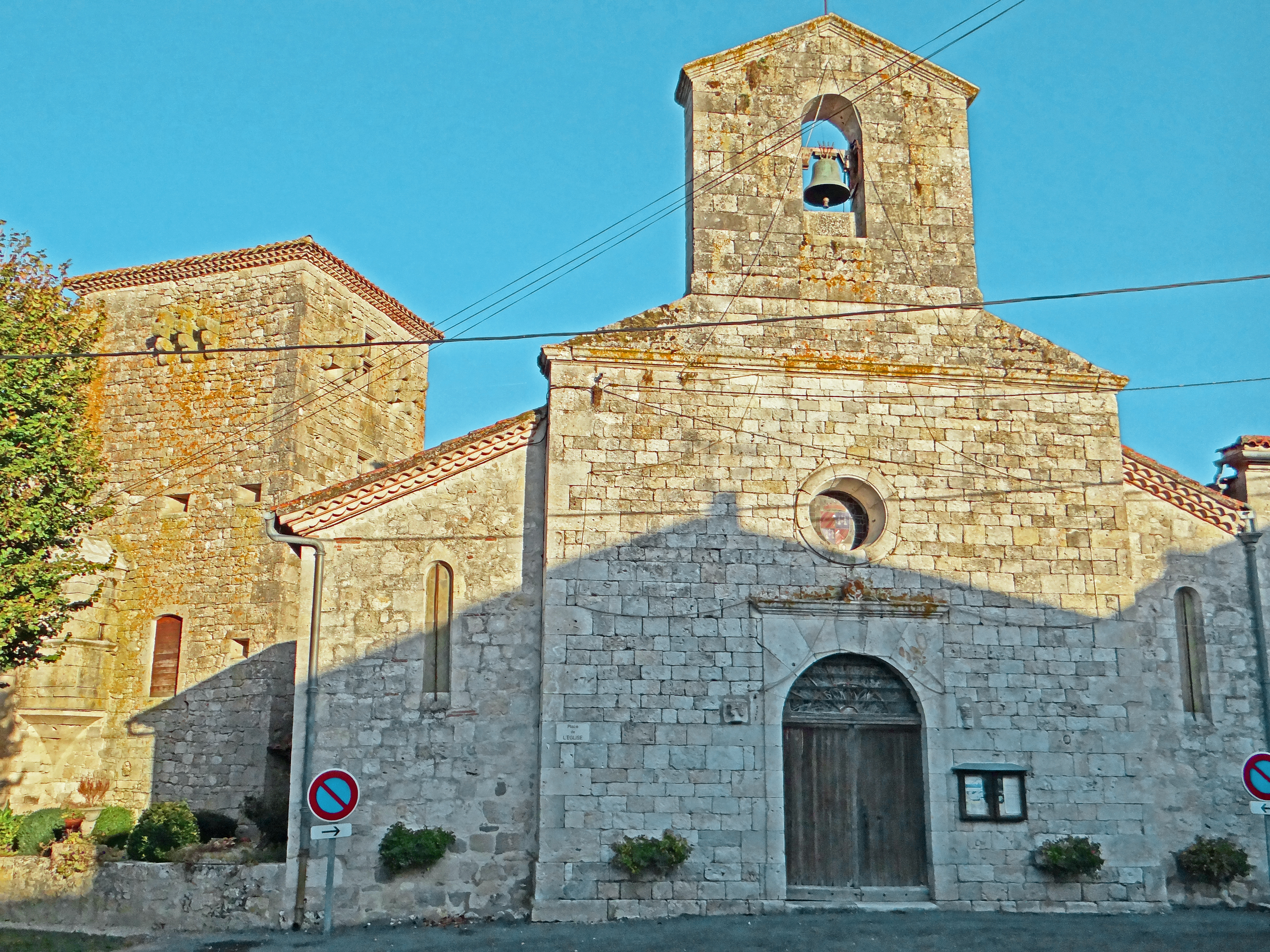
- The church and tower in Laugnac

- Coat of arms
- Location of Laugnac
- Location within France Location within Nouvelle-Aquitaine
- Coordinates: 44°18′26″N 0°36′20″E
- Country: France
- Region: Nouvelle-Aquitaine
- Department: Lot-et-Garonne
- Arrondissement: Agen
- Canton: Le Confluent
- Intercommunality: Confluent et Coteaux de Prayssas

Government
  - Mayor (2020–2026): Jocelyne Labat
- Area^{1}: 17.35 km^{2} (6.70 sq mi)
- Elevation: 120 m (390 ft)
- Highest elevation: 246 m (807 ft)
- Lowest elevation: 90 m (300 ft)
- Population (2023): 675
  - Density: 38.9/km^{2} (101/sq mi)
- Demonym: laugnacais
- Time zone: UTC+01:00 (CET)
  - Summer (DST): UTC+02:00 (CEST)
- INSEE/Postal code: 47140 /47360
- ^{1} French Land Register data, which excludes lakes, ponds, glaciers > 1 km^{2} (0.386 sq mi or 247 acres) and river estuaries.

Laugnac (French pronunciation: [loɲak]; Occitan: Launhac) is a commune in the southwest of France, located in the center of department of Lot-et -Garonne (region Nouvelle-Aquitaine). Small village also called "Capital of Lot-et-Garonne" due to its geographical location.

Its inhabitants are called Laugnacais and Laugnacaises.

== See also ==
- Communes of the Lot-et-Garonne department
