= Aimé-Victor-François Guilbert =

French prelate

His Eminence Aimé-Victor-François Guilbert
- Cardinal, Archbishop of Bordeaux
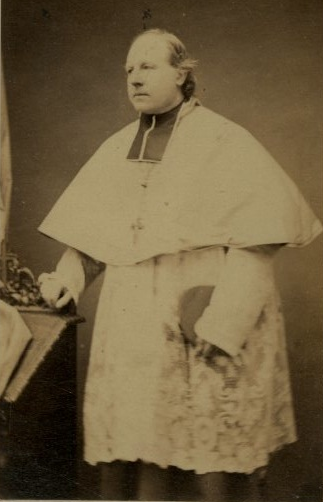
- Photograph by Pierre Petit, c. 1880
- Church: Catholic Church
- Archdiocese: Bordeaux
- Appointed: 9 August 1883
- Term ended: 16 August 1889
- Predecessor: François-Auguste-Ferdinand Donnet
- Successor: Victor-Lucien-Sulpice Lécot
- Previous posts: Bishop of Gap (1867-79); Bishop of Amiens (1879-83)

Orders
- Ordination: 17 December 1836 by Louis-Jean-Julien Robiou de la Tréhonnais
- Consecration: 10 November 1867 by François-Augustin Delamare
- Created cardinal: 24 May 1889 by Leo XIII
- Rank: Cardinal-Priest

Personal details
- Born: 15 November 1812 Cerisy-la-Forêt, Coutances, First French Empire
- Died: 16 August 1889 (aged 76) Gap, French Third Republic
- Buried: Bordeaux Cathedral
- Parents: Jean Victor Guilbert; Jeanne Françoise Thienotte
- Motto: Crux spes
- Coat of arms

Aimé-Victor-François Guilbert (15 November 1812 – 16 August 1889) was a French Catholic prelate who served as Bishop of Gap from 1867 to 1879, Bishop of Amiens from 1879 to 1883, and as Archbishop of Bordeaux from 1879 until his death. He was raised to the rank of cardinal in 1889.

== Biography ==
Aimé-Victor-François Guilbert was born in Cerisy-la-Forêt on 15 November 1812. He was ordained a priest of the Diocese of Coutances on 17 December 1836. He taught at the minor seminaries in Coutances and Mandeville, then led the minor seminaries in Mortain and Valogne, where he became archpriest in 1855.

He was appointed Bishop of Gap on 20 September 1867 and received his episcopal consecration from François-Augustine Delamare, Archbishop of Auch, on 10 November. At the First Vatican Council he opposed the declaration of the doctrine of papal infallibility; he was atypical of the Church hierarchy in being comfortable reconciling the Church to the modern world.

Pope Leo XIII confirmed his appointment as Bishop of Amiens on 22 September 1879 and then as Archbishop of Bordeaux on 9 August 1883. There he continued his attempts to reconcile the Church to the French Republic and opposed Catholic monarchists, publishing his arguments in 1886 as La démocratie et son avenir social et religieux.

Pope Leo created him a cardinal priest on 24 May 1889.

Guilbert died less than three months later on 16 August 1889 in Gap, where he had consecrated the new bishop, Prosper-Amable Berthet, on 1 August. He had not visited Rome to receive his red biretta and be assigned his titular church.
