= Raymond Séguy =

French bishop (1929–2022)

The Most Reverend Raymond Séguy
- Bishop of Autun
- Diocese: Autun
- Appointed: 31 July 1987
- Term ended: 8 April 2006
- Predecessor: Armand-François Le Bourgeois
- Successor: Benoît Rivière
- Previous post: Bishop of Gap (1981–1987)

Orders
- Ordination: 18 September 1954 by Roger Bourrat
- Consecration: 22 November 1981 by Bernard Panafieu

Personal details
- Born: Raymond Gaston Joseph Séguy; 8 December 1929 Rieupeyroux, France
- Died: 21 March 2022 (aged 92) Rodez, France
- Education: Pontifical Gregorian University
- Coat of arms

Styles of Raymond Séguy
- Reference style: His Excellency; The Most Reverend
- Spoken style: Your Excellency
- Religious style: Bishop

Raymond Séguy (8 December 1929 – 21 March 2022) was a French Roman Catholic bishop.

Séguy was born in Rieupeyroux, Aveyron, France and was ordained to the priesthood in 1954. He served as bishop of the Roman Catholic Diocese of Gap, France from 1981 to 1987 and as bishop of the Roman Catholic Diocese of Autun, France, from 1987 until his retirement in 2006. He died on 21 March 2022 at the age of 92.
