= Saint-Méry =

- Commune
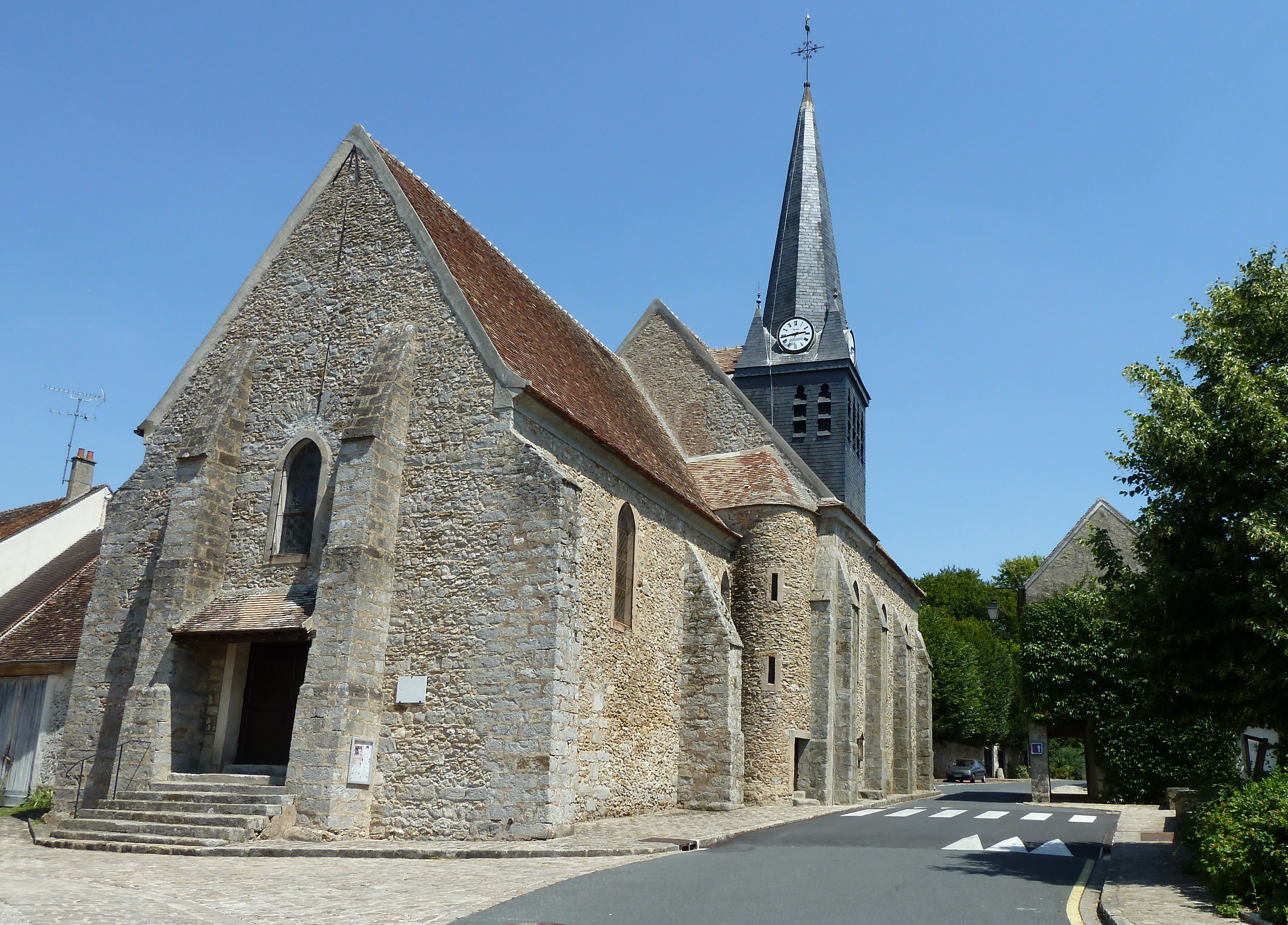
- The church in Saint-Méry
- Location of Saint-Méry
- Location within France Location within Île-de-France (region)
- Coordinates: 48°34′41″N 2°49′37″E
- Country: France
- Region: Île-de-France
- Department: Seine-et-Marne
- Arrondissement: Melun
- Canton: Nangis
- Intercommunality: CC Brie des Rivières et Châteaux

Government
  - Mayor (2020–2026): Françoise Kubiak
- Area^{1}: 9.94 km^{2} (3.84 sq mi)
- Highest elevation: 113 m (371 ft)
- Lowest elevation: 73 m (240 ft)
- Population (2023): 334
  - Density: 33.6/km^{2} (87.0/sq mi)
- Time zone: UTC+01:00 (CET)
  - Summer (DST): UTC+02:00 (CEST)
- INSEE/Postal code: 77426 /77720
- ^{1} French Land Register data, which excludes lakes, ponds, glaciers > 1 km^{2} (0.386 sq mi or 247 acres) and river estuaries.

Saint-Méry (French pronunciation: [sɛ̃ meʁi]) is a commune in the Seine-et-Marne department in the Île-de-France region in north-central France.

== History ==
Towards the end of the seventh century, Saint Mederic, abbot of Saint-Martin d'Autun, set off on a pilgrimage to the tombs of Saint Denis and Saint Germain, in Paris, in the company of a young monk named Frodulphe. The road was long because the abbot, aging and tired, had to stop often to take rest. It was thus that Mederic and Frodulphe halted at a deserted spot near Paris, where a chapel was then erected to commemorate the pilgrim abbe, whose charity, piety, and miracles had struck the people. Soon some houses came to group around the building placed under the name of Saint-Médéric said Saint-Merry, Saint-Merri or Saint-Méry.

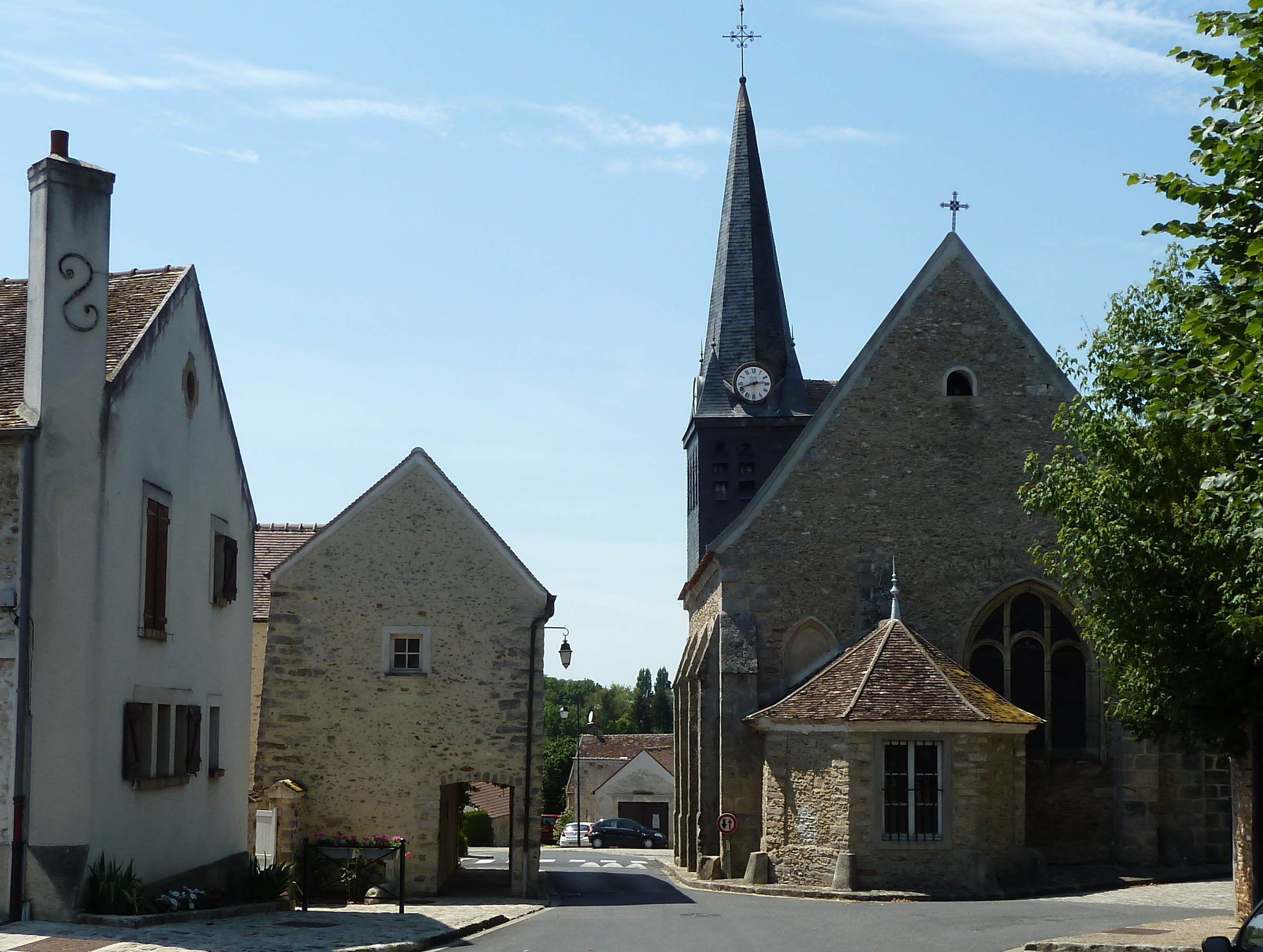
church of Saint-Méry

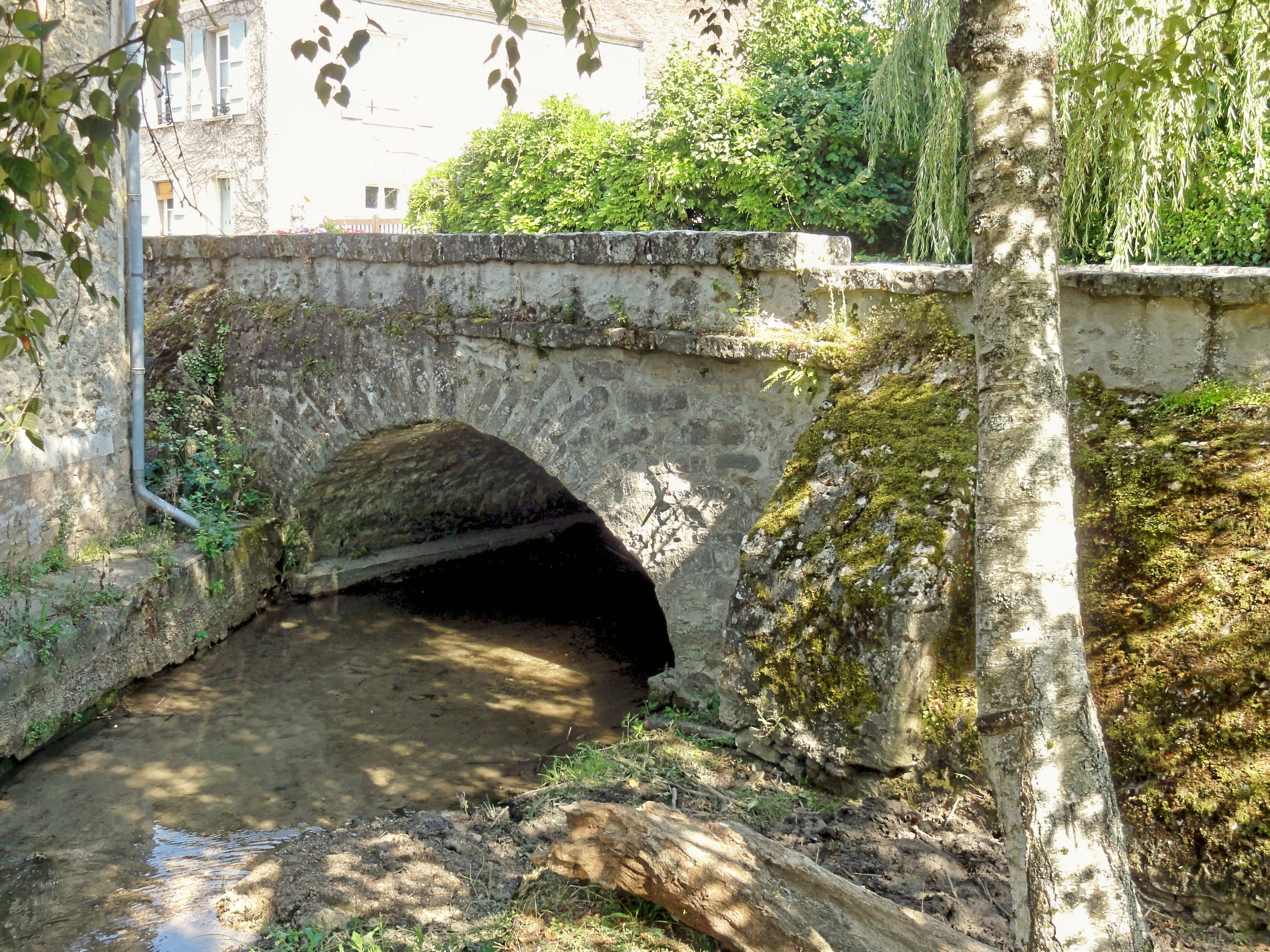
bridge in Saint Mery

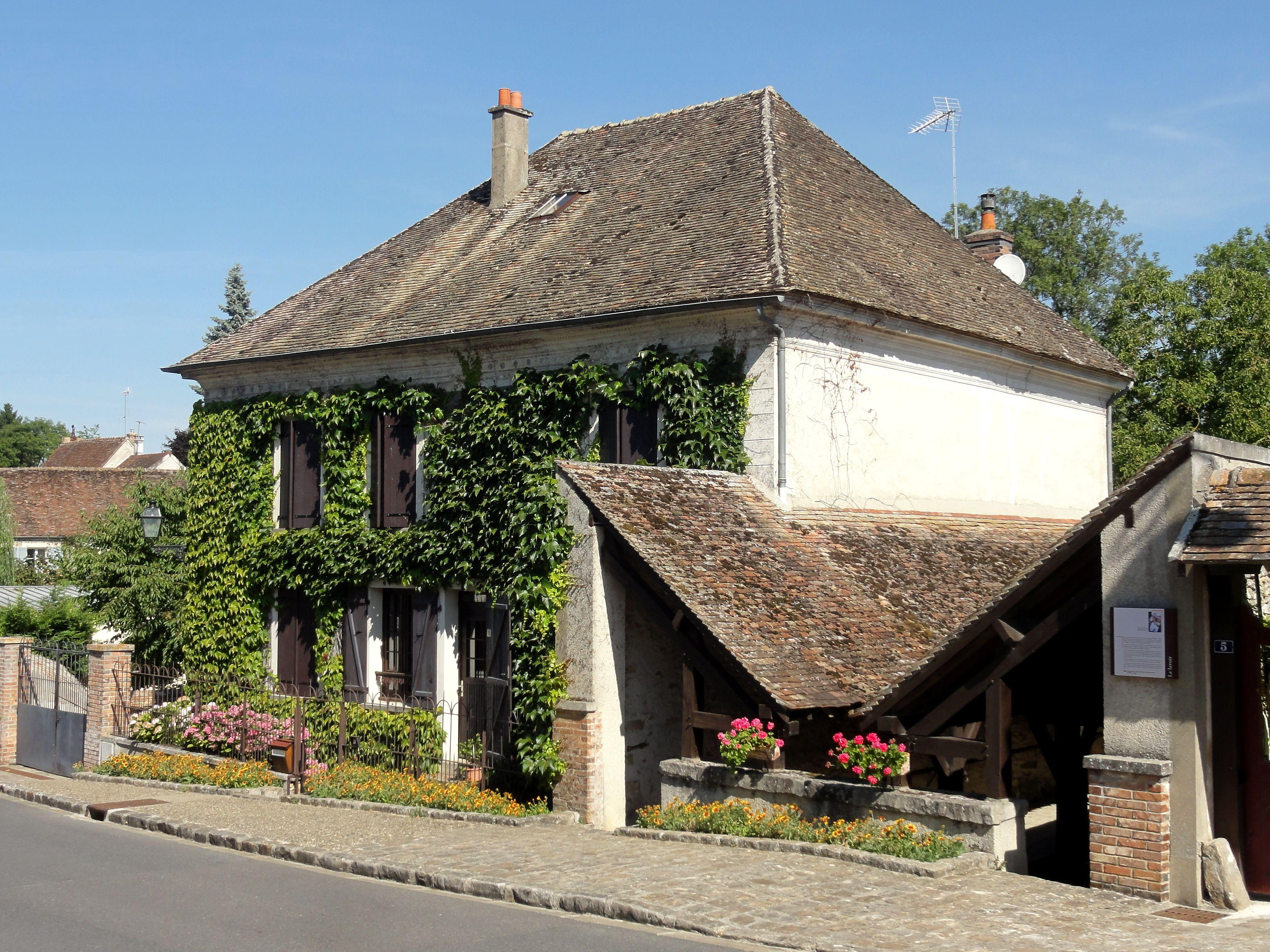
Wash house in Saint-Méry

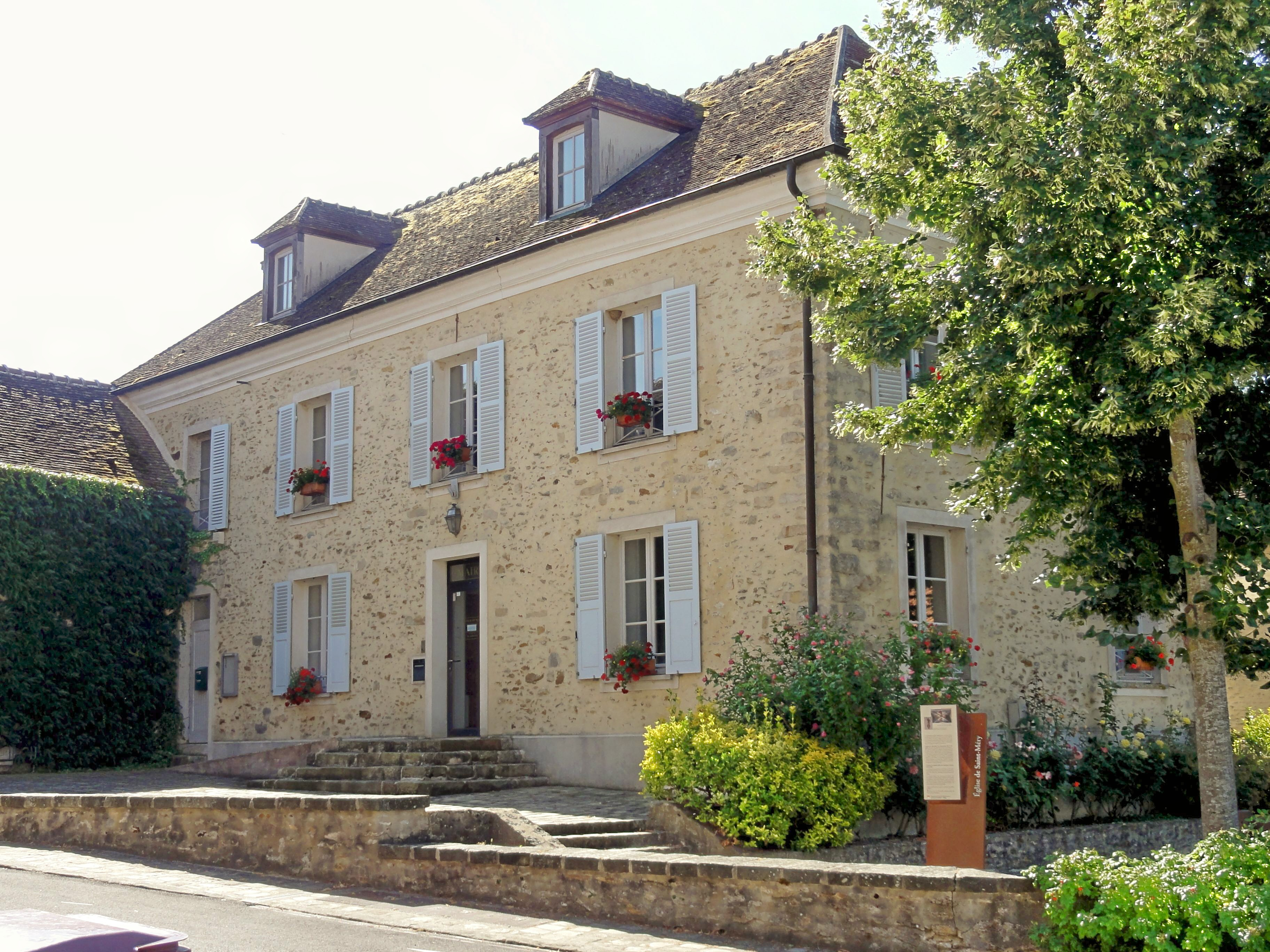
Saint-Méry Town Hall at 77 Church Street

== Population ==
Inhabitants of Saint-Méry are called Médériciens in French.

Historical population
Year	Pop.	±% p.a.
1968	255	—
1975	236	−1.10%
1982	278	+2.37%
1990	302	+1.04%
1999	366	+2.16%
2007	389	+0.76%
2012	372	−0.89%
2017	344	−1.55%
2023	334	−0.49%
Source: INSEE

== See also ==
- Communes of the Seine-et-Marne department
