= List of protected heritage sites in Nandrin =

This table shows an overview of the protected heritage sites in the Walloon town Nandrin. This list is part of Belgium's national heritage.

Object	Year/architect	Town/section	Address	Coordinates	Number^{?}	Image
Fraineux castle chapel, the entrance ramp and the wall of the park and surroundings ^{(nl)} ^{(fr)}		Nandrin	Nandrin	50.514038°N 5.397654°E	61043-CLT-0001-01	
Pastorage of Saint-Séverin ^{(nl)} ^{(fr)}		Nandrin	Place F. Gonda n° 17	50.529667°N 5.412620°E	61043-CLT-0002-01	
Church of Saint Peter and Saint Paul ^{(nl)} ^{(fr)}		Nandrin		50.529862°N 5.412587°E	61043-CLT-0003-01	Kerk Saints-Pierre-et-Paul
Old cemetery near the church Saint-Pierre-et-Paul ^{(nl)} ^{(fr)}		Nandrin		50.530001°N 5.410827°E	61043-CLT-0004-01	
Church of St Pierre ^{(nl)} ^{(fr)}		Nandrin		50.508240°N 5.370557°E	61043-CLT-0005-01	
Old Knights Templar headquarters in the Temple Bar: walls, towers, ruins of the house ^{(nl)} ^{(fr)}		Nandrin	rue Joseph Pierco, n°s 35-36	50.507899°N 5.369584°E	61043-CLT-0006-01	
Castle Tour-au-Bois ^{(nl)} ^{(fr)}		Nandrin	rue Tour-au-Bois et alentours (S)	50.518714°N 5.357393°E	61043-CLT-0007-01	
Castle Tour-au-Bois: walls and roofs, staircase, oval drawing room and fireplaces in rooms on the first floor and the road on the ground floor ^{(nl)} ^{(fr)}		Nandrin	rue de la Tour-au-Bois n° 235	50.518863°N 5.362655°E	61043-CLT-0008-01	
Abdijhoeve: walls and roofs ^{(nl)} ^{(fr)}		Nandrin	n°180	50.514779°N 5.363814°E	61043-CLT-0009-01	
Cross and chapel facade ^{(nl)} ^{(fr)}		Nandrin	rue de la Chapelle, contre le n° 15, sise dans le site classé par A.R. du 09/01/1978	50.513737°N 5.397806°E	61043-CLT-0010-01	
Mansion Tour: house, keep, and staircase ^{(nl)} ^{(fr)}		Nandrin	rue Joseph Pierco, n° 42	50.507920°N 5.367627°E	61043-CLT-0011-01	
Tower of the castle ^{(nl)} ^{(fr)}		Nandrin	Nandrin	50.506681°N 5.421262°E	61043-CLT-0015-01	

== See also ==
- List of protected heritage sites in Liège (province)
- Nandrin
