= Frodulphe =

French abbot

Frodulphe de Barjon, known as Saint Frou, born in the 7th century at Autun, and died in the 8th century at Barjon, was a religious and holy French Catholic, a disciple of Saint Mederic.

== Early life ==
Placed as an oblate at the Abbey of St. Martin, Autun, Frodulphe de Barjon learns prayer, meditation, and penance. It was under his abbacy that Saint Mederic made him his disciple and his friend; he had kept it on the baptismal font and devoted himself to his education. When St. Merry left the monastery to take refuge in the solitude of the great woods of the Morvan, surely he was one of those who went in search of him and found him, begged him to return to take care of them. Not having succeeded, he was surely brothers who went to fetch the bishop of Autun, Ansbert, to bring him back to the heart of his monastery [ref. necessary]. Once back home, life resumed.

Frodulphe de Barjon accompanied his master on his journey to Paris, about 696, on a pilgrimage to the tomb of Saint Denis, and met their compatriot Germain de Paris, who was formerly abbot of the abbey of Saint-Symphorien d'Autun. On the way, he stopped at the Collegiate Church of Saint-Martin de Champeaux in Brie, near Melun, Merry being sick. They had made this long journey on foot. Having left for Paris, the two men stopped at Bonneuil-sur-Marne and Charenton-le-Pont, the Abbe Merry multiplying the number of miracles on his way. Having settled again in a solitary place, some faithful began to gather and thus was born in the hamlet of Saint-Méry. Deciding to collect themselves also on the tomb of Saint Denis, they made a stop at Thomery.

Arriving in Paris, they discovered, in a small wood, on what was formerly the island Saint-Martin, in the marsh, a small chapel near the church of Saint-Pierre-des-Bois, where they decided to stay. They stayed there for two years and nine months. It is in this hermitage that his companion died on August 29, 700. Frodulphe de Barjon returned to Burgundy and became abbot of the monastery of St. Martin, which he left when the Saracens of General Ambiza sacked Autun on August 22, 725, and retired as a hermit in the solitude of Barjon.

Part of his body was repatriated to Paris to be buried near his master in St. Peter's Chapel. Bones of his body are preserved in a reliquary of gilded wood in the parish church of Saint-Philibert in Trouhaut (Côte-d'Or)

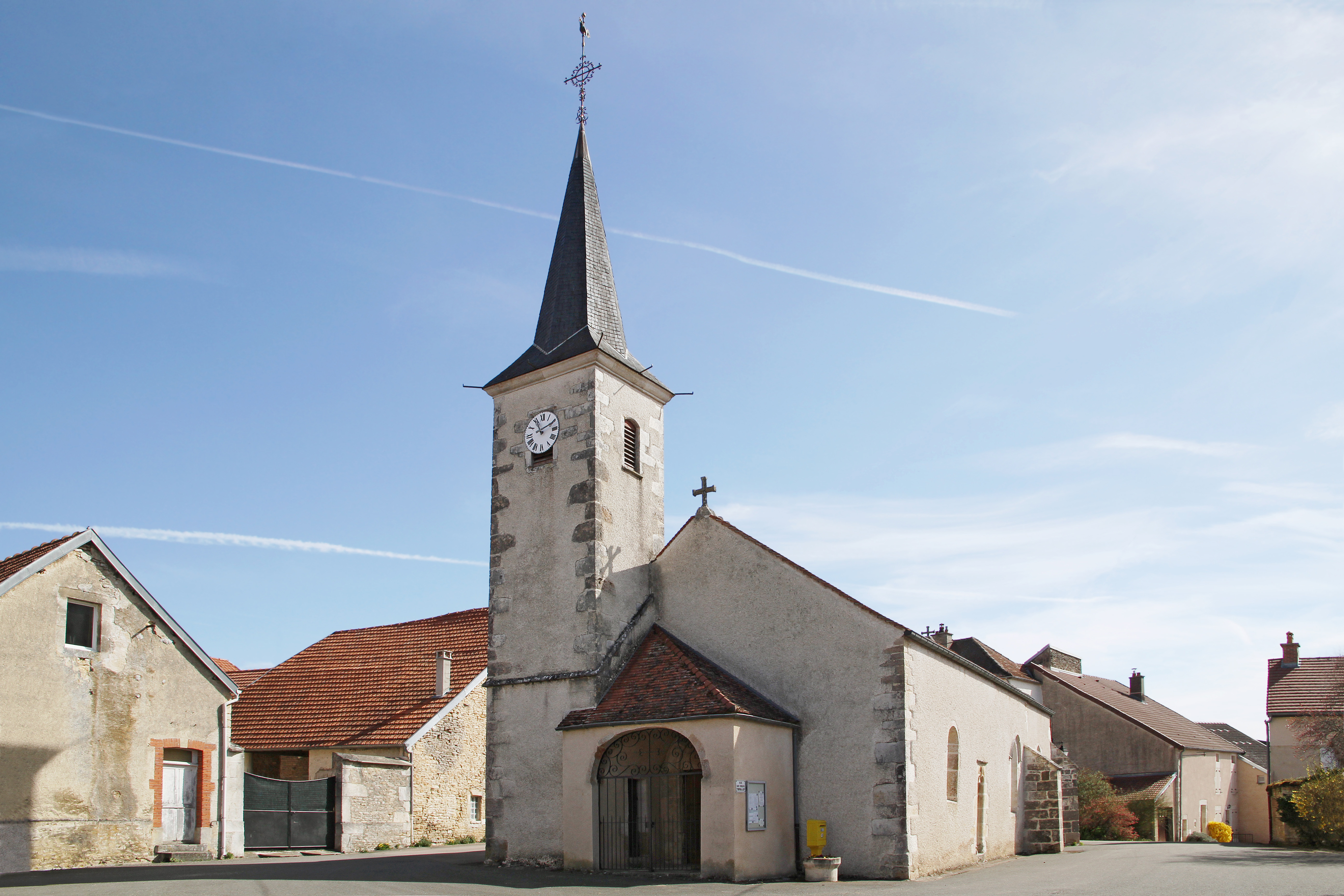
Église Saint-Frodulphe de Barjon

== Legacy ==
Saint Frou is invoked against headaches and toothaches.

The sarcophagus of Saint Frou in the parish church in Barjon (Côte-d'Or) is listed as an historical monument.
