= Jean Rolin =

Jean Rolin may refer to:

- Jean Rolin (writer) (born 1945), French writer and journalist
- Jean Rolin (cardinal) (1408–1483), French bishop and cardinal
- Jean VI Rolin (c. 1450–1501), his son, French bishop
- Master of Jean Rolin II (15th century), anonymous artist

== See also ==
- Jean Rollin (1938–2010), French film director, actor, and novelist
