= Jean VI Rolin =

Jean VI Rolin or Rollin (c.1450 – April 4, 1501), often referred to as Jean II Rolin to differentiate him from his father Jean Rolin or Rollin in the succession of the offices of Bishop of Autun, abbot of the Abbey of St. Martin, Autun, and prior of the Abbey of Saint-Marcel-lès-Chalon, was a French bishop.

== Biography ==
Jean VI Rolin was the illegitimate son of Jean V Rolin, Cardinal Rolin, and Raymonde de Roucy or Roussy, a nun of Avignon; he was legitimised by King Charles VIII in 1485. He spent his youth at the court of Burgundy, and won the tournament organized by John of Luxembourg for the feast day of the Order of the Golden Fleece in 1472, in Valenciennes.

In 1477, after the death of Charles the Bold, he remained in the service of Charles' widow Margaret of York and became master of the petitions of the Duke of Austria.

He obtained a prebend in 1482 at the Collegiate Church of Our Lady, Beaune, and the position of dean of the Collegiate Church of Our Lady in Semur-en-Auxois. Antoine de Chalon, bishop of Autun, gave him his support in obtaining the position of dean of Autun Cathedral in 1484. The Estates of Burgundy named him ambassador to Charles VIII of France, of whom he quickly became the counsellor. He entered the Parlement of Paris and rose through the various levels.

He was bishop of Autun from June 8, 1500, to the date of his death on April 4, 1501, some considerable time after receiving the pallium, a position obtained with difficulty, because the previous bishop, Antoine de Chalon, had resigned to make way for Olivier de Vienne, a canon of Lyon, and Pope Alexander VI, had already granted the appropriate bulls. The canons of Autun protested and, with the support of King Louis XII, pressed their claim freely to elect their bishop, in this instance in the person of their dean, Jean Rolin. The Pope revoked the provision already made and transferred the bishopric to Rolin, but not until after the death of Olivier de Vienne.

In his will Jean Rolin asked for a modest funeral and to be buried in Autun Cathedral, in the chapel of the Holy Cross, located in the eastern side, which he had put under the patronage of St. Martin. According to his wishes his body was accompanied during the funeral ceremony by thirty paupers, six foundlings and prayers of the Friars Minor, recently established in the city. He founded an anniversary mass in the Abbey of St. Martin, the Abbey of St. Symphorian and the Abbey of St. Andoche, all in Autun.
