= Charonne quarter =

Coordinates: 48°51′37″N 2°24′15″E

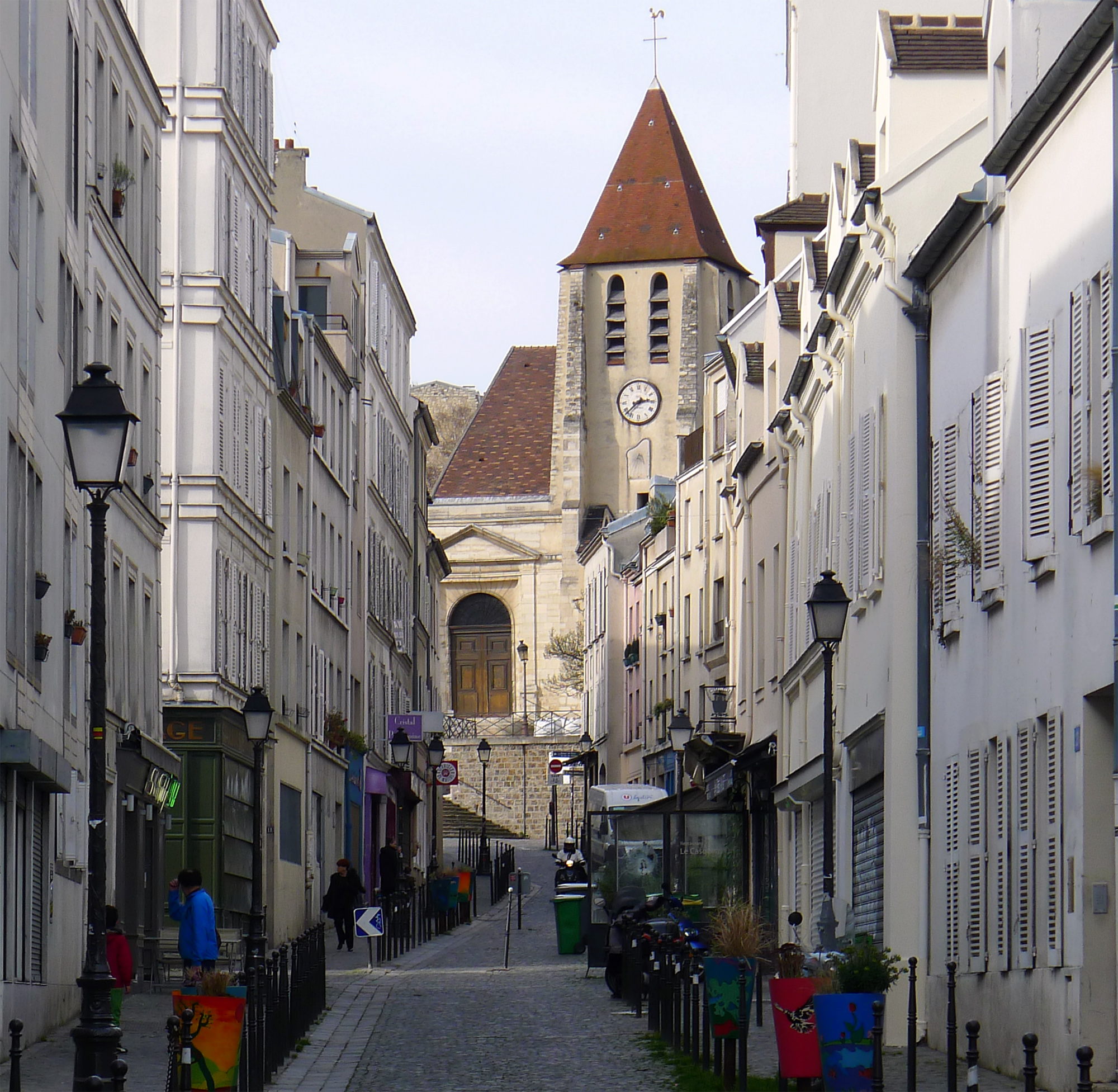
Rue Saint-Blaise and the church of Saint-Germain-de-Charonne in the background

The Charonne quarter is an area of the 20th arrondissement of Paris named after a former municipality in the area, which was merged into the city of Paris in 1860 by Napoleon III and split between Charonne quarter (south part), the Père-Lachaise quarter and Saint-Fargeau quarter (north part). The historic centre of Charonne is located around the junction of Rue de Bagnolet and Rue Saint-Blaise, in the vicinity of the parish church of Saint-Germain-de-Charonne (which is on the Père-Lachaise quarter).

The metro station called Charonne, notable for the demonstration of 8 February 1962, is named after a street in the 11th arrondissement – Rue de Charonne, in the Bastille neighbourhood – and is not actually located in the district of Charonne, which covers the southern half of the 20th arrondissement.
