= Church of Saint Peter and Saint Paul, Saint-Séverin-en-Condroz =

Church in Saint-Séverin-en-Condroz, Belgium

Coordinates: 50°31′47″N 05°24′43″E

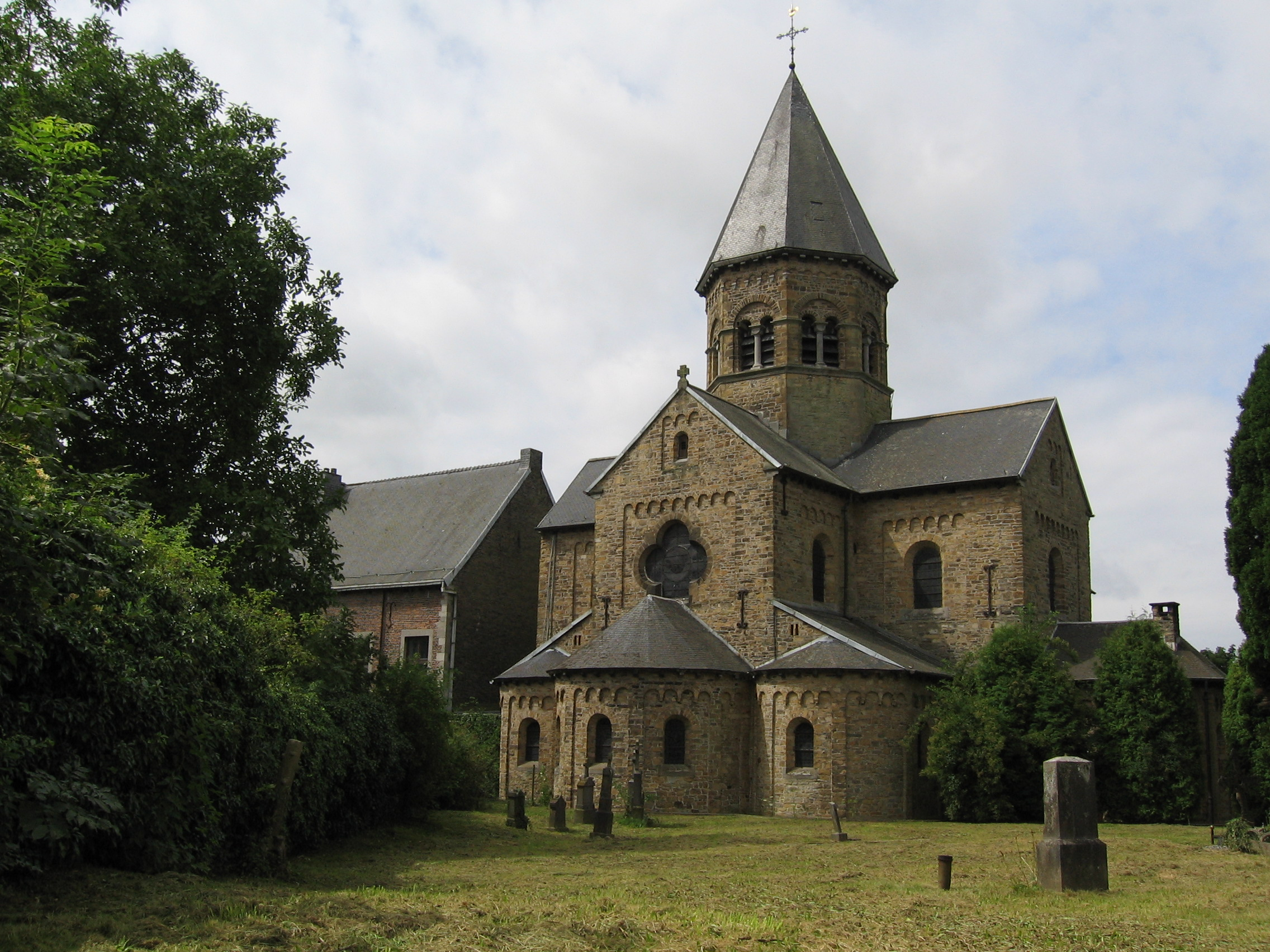
The Church of Saint Peter and Saint Paul in Saint-Séverin-en-Condroz, view from the north-east

The Church of Saint Peter and Saint Paul is a church in Saint-Séverin-en-Condroz, a village and district in the municipality of Nandrin, located in the province of Liège in Wallonia, Belgium. It traces its origins to a priory founded sometime after 1091. The currently visible church dates from the 12th century. Despite numerous later alterations and renovations, it retains much of its Romanesque character.

== History ==
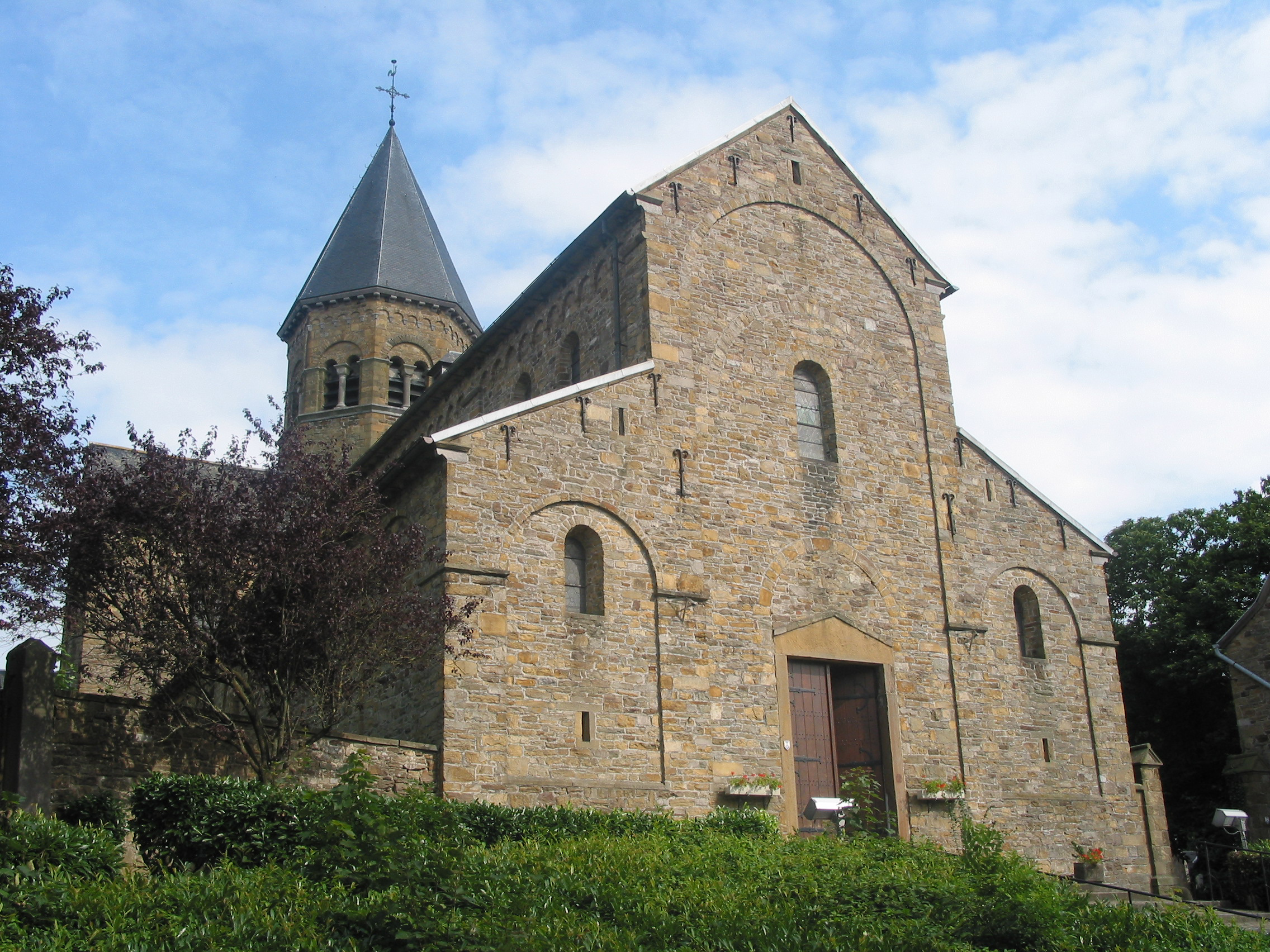
View from the west, with the main façade and entrance

The early history of the church is not well known. It may originally have been dedicated to Saint Symphorian. In 1091 the land was donated to Cluny Abbey, and a priory was established soon thereafter. In 1107 it is known that a monk from Sint-Truiden Abbey went there to live as a hermit.

The currently visible church was consecrated sometime before 1145. At the beginning of the 16th century, it passed from Cluny to the Prince-Bishopric of Liège during the bishopric of Érard de la Marck, before being taken over by the Jesuits in 1574. From 1773 it has served as a parish church.

The church has been renovated and rebuilt on several occasions. Already in the 14th century, the roof was replaced, the chancel vaults changed and the vaults of the aisles removed. In the first half of the 16th century, restoration works were carried out under the guidance of architect Arnold van Mulken. The church was renovated in the 18th century, and in the 19th century a major reconstruction took place. In 1861–1863, the apses, chancel and tower were rebuilt in a Romanesque Revival style, and again in 1899–1901 the façade, aisles, the westernmost bay and the upper part of the walls of the nave were completely changed. After further works in 1915, the church has remained largely unchanged in appearance.

== Description ==
Interior view from the entrance towards the east

Despite being heavily altered during subsequent centuries, the church retains much of its Romanesque character; art historian Jacqueline Leclercq-Marx has described it as a "jewel of 12-century Mosan architecture". The plan is typical for Benedictine architecture. It consists of a nave and aisles, six bays long, a transept supporting the central, polygonal tower, and three parallel apses. Apart from the outer and upper walls of the nave, the westernmost bay of the nave and aisles, and the heavily rebuilt apses, the Romanesque stonework is preserved in the walls of the chancel, transept, and the piers and columns. The latter showcase an alternation of supports typical of Romanesque architecture.

The church possesses a decorated baptismal font, contemporary with the church. Among the inventories is also a large wooden sculpture of Christ on the cross, made in the 16th century, and an accompanying sculpture of John the Evangelist.

== Sources cited ==
- Barral i Altet, Xavier (1989). Belgique Romane (in French). Zodiaque. ISBN 2-7369-0166-5.
- Leclercq-Marx, Jacqueline (1997). L'art Roman en Belgique (in French). Braine-l'Alleud: J.-M. Collet. OCLC 40595503.
- Menne, Gilbert, ed. (2014). Le grand guide de Wallonie et de Bruxelles (in French). Brussels: Racine. ISBN 978-94-014-1418-0.
