= Euphronius of Autun =

Bishop of Autun

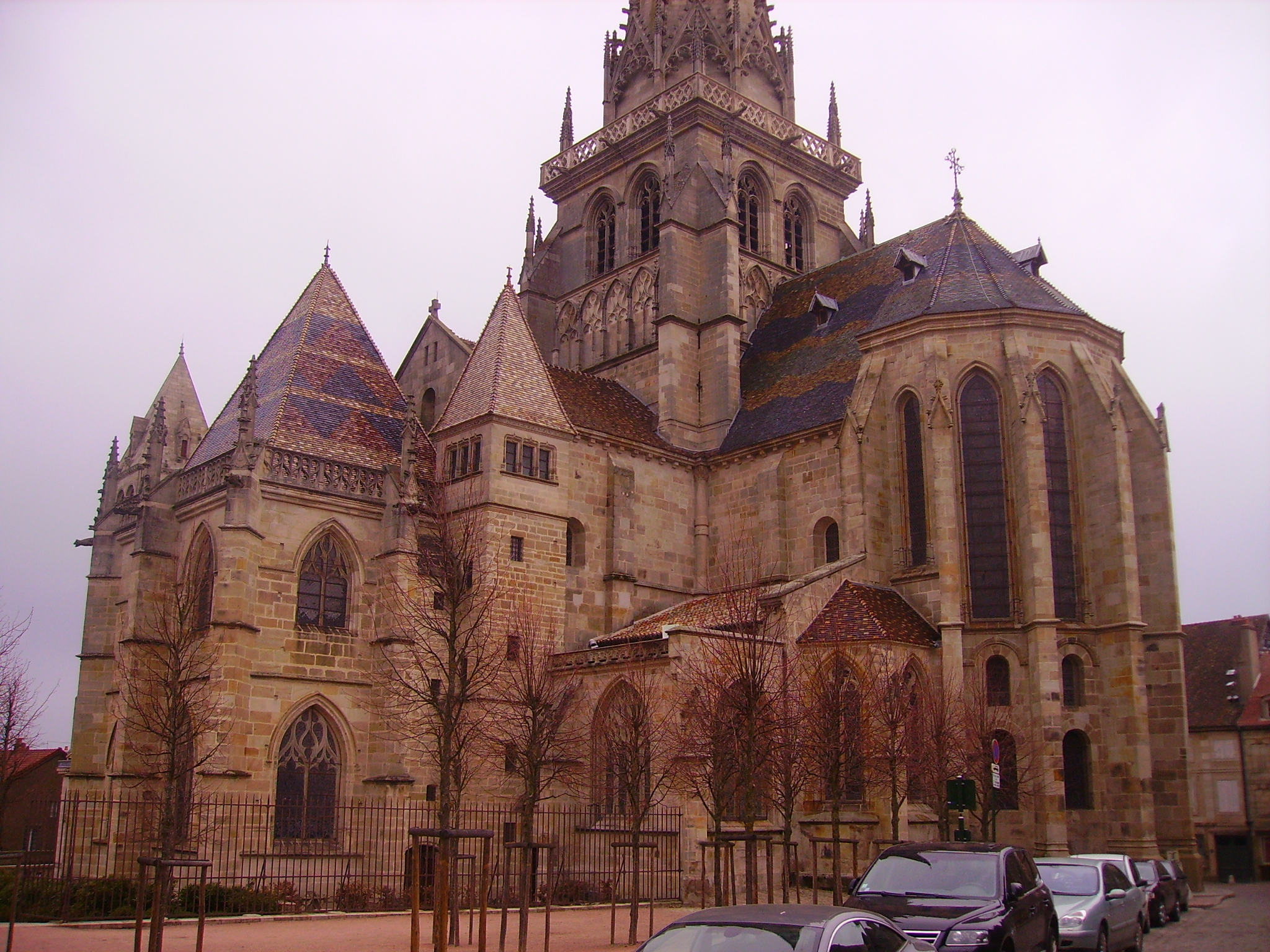
Autun Cathedral

Saint Euphronius of Autun (died after 472) was a bishop of Autun between 450 and 490. According to Dom Basil Watkins OSB, Euphronius "was one of the greatest bishops of Gaul..."in the 5th century.

== Life ==
He became bishop in 451 at the latest. Gregory of Tours reports that he had built a church dedicated to Saint Symphorian in Autun. He was a friend of Bishop Lupus of Troyes.

The letters of Sidonius Apollinaris note that around the year 470 he accompanied the bishop of Lyon and other prelates to Chalon-sur-Saône to consecrate a new bishop. Also in 472, Sidonius wrote to him to attend the consecration of the new bishop of Bourges.

In 453 Euphronius composed a letter, now lost, to the bishop of Angers, Talasius. It is reproduced in the Concilia Antiquae Galliae. Around 470, when Bishop Perpetuus of Tours was building a new church to house the remains of Martin of Tours, Euphronius sent marble for the cover of the saint's tomb. Euphronius was buried in the graveyard of the Abbey of St. Symphorian, Autun; his name is in the Roman Martyrology for August 3.

== Sources ==
- Nominis: Saint Euphrone (in French)
