= Mederic (monk) =

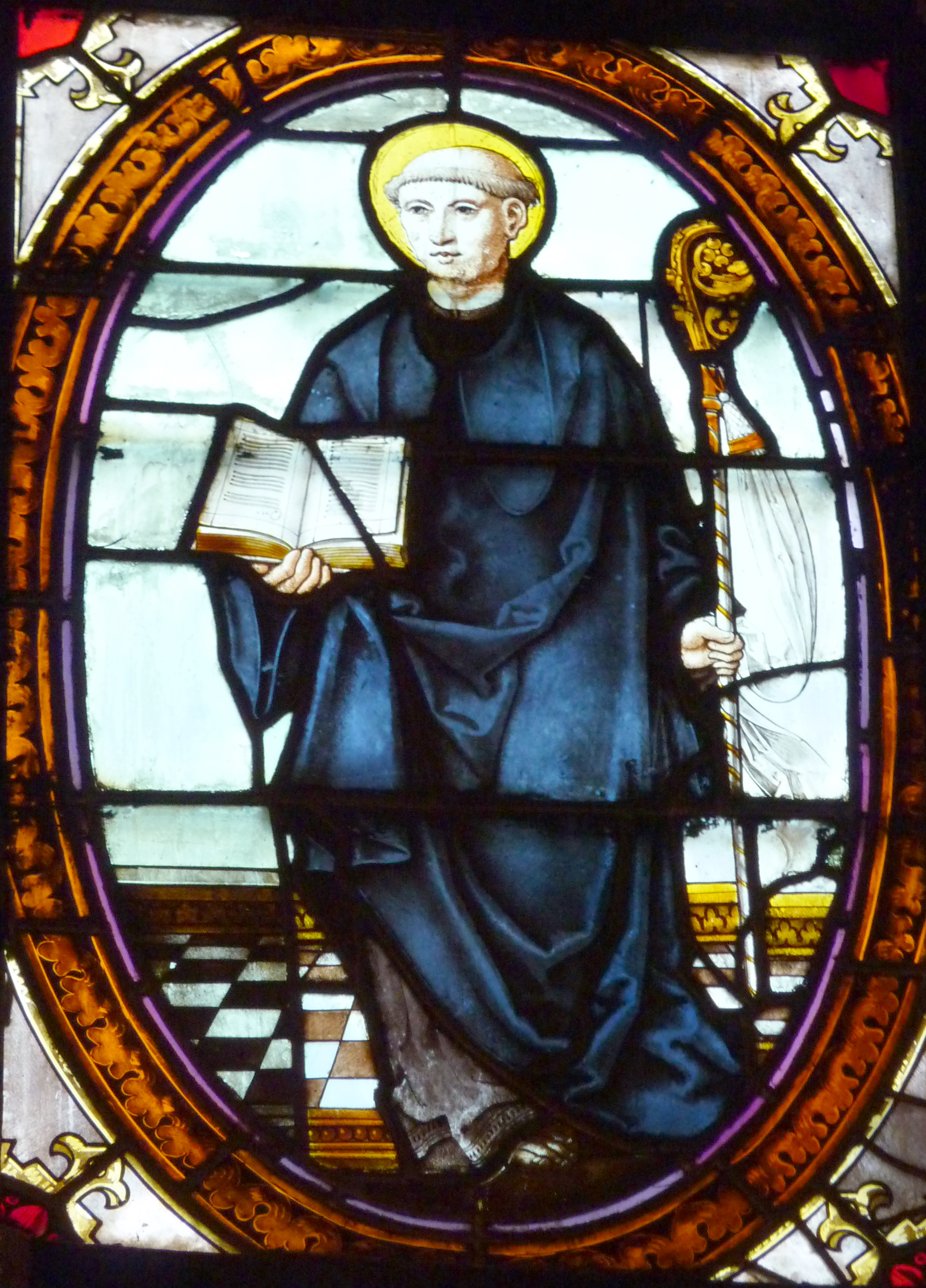
Chapel of the Virgin

Saint Mederic or Medericus, also known in French as Saint Merri or Médéric (died 29 August 700), was a monk and a hermit, who is considered patron saint of the right bank of the river Seine in central Paris.

== Early life ==
Born into an illustrious family in the Morvan near Autun, he was offered at the age of 13 as an oblate at the Abbey of St. Martin, Autun. He receives an education of prayer, obedience and chastity. The oblate crowned with flowers, double symbol of innocence and sacrifice, was led to the church surrounded by his relatives and their friends. The religious assembled in the choir prayed for the one whom their adoption would initiate to the labors and the joys of a new family. The celebrant began the divine service and called on his head the grace of Christ. After the gospel, the oblate approached the altar carrying a host and a chalice with a little wine which the priest received as a deposit to the Lord. His father or his parents wrapped his hand and offering in the altar cloth, which was spread over him as a sign of adoption by the Church. After warning the child of the austerities of the monastic life, he read to him the rule of St. Benedict and the parents pledged for him. His hair was shaved and he put on the monks' cucula. He was no longer entitled to the paternal inheritance. Around the age of 15, he was allowed to make a profession. Wealthy parents made an offering to the monastery.

== Career ==
Mederic astonished the fifty of his classmates by the observance of a rigorous discipline. Barley bread dipped in water was his only food, which he only took twice a week. His eyes still fixed on the Crucifix, he was wearing a hair shirt under his coat. He lived thus for several years, hiding from the other monks. But his reputation for holiness passed the doors of the convent, and celebrity came to fetch him at the end of the cloister.

Herald, abbot of Saint-Martin, having died about 680, it is quite naturally that the brothers elected him, following the advice of the bishop of Autun, Hermenarius, who recommended them to choose a pastor able to save the flock of the Christ of the Wolf Tooth. After three days of fasting the monks assembled at the church, sang the Mass of the Holy Ghost, intoned the Veni Creator, and proceeded to the election of their abbot by designating Mederic unanimously. The crowd ran to the monastery. The bishop, hearing him proclaimed from the top of the ambo, addressed the new abbot:

"Flambeau du Christ, vase d'élection du trésor divin, reçois la mesure dispensatoire du Dieu éternel pour nourrir les troupeaux du créateur. Instruis-les par tes conseils et tes préceptes et mérites d'entendre ces paroles du juge miséricordieux : O bon fidèle serviteur, parce que tu as été fidèle en peu de choses, je t'établirai sur beaucoup d'autres, entre dans la joie de ton Seigneur" (Math.25.11)

The more he was raised, the more he faded away. This new life soon weighed on him. His many miracles attracted the crowds. No longer finding in this place peace and deep communion with God, Mederic decided to withdraw into the solitude of the forest of Morvan to finally be alone with God. He built a cell there some distance from Autun but this secret was quickly broken because the monks, plunged in sadness by his disappearance, went in search of him. Mederic not wanting to follow them, they asked the bishop who, threatening excommunication, managed to get him back to the monastery.

== Later life ==
Among his clergy the young monk Frodulphe, also known as Saint Frou, was close to the master who had held him on the baptismal font and had educated himself to raise him to the highest degrees of perfection. Frodulphe, enamored of solitude like his master, proposed to him a pilgrimage to the tomb of Saint Denis and Saint Germain, their compatriot, abbot of the Abbey of St. Symphorian, Autun, before becoming bishop of Paris.

The two monks took the road to Paris and on the way they multiplied the miracles. The aging Mederic had great difficulty in making this journey on foot, and fell ill on arriving at the Collegiate Church of Saint-Martin de Champeaux, near Melun, where they stopped for several months. The two men spent long hours praying in the church. Sometimes they went to Melun to exercise charity; hearing some of the prisoners moaning from the depths of their cell, Mederic moved his heart and asked God for their deliverance. The doors of the prison opened on their own. His cure delayed, he left the monastery of Champeaux. The people came to make him many gifts which he hastened to distribute to the poor.

Halfway to Paris, he cures a poor man's fever answering to the name of Ursus. A woman named Bénédicte recovered health through her intercession. Arrived at Bonneuil-sur-Marne where he learns that two thieves were in chains, he asks God for his intercession and obtains the release of the two men. On the side of Charenton-le-Pont, he delivered another criminal who had broken the bridge. He was again forced to stop by fatigue. It was in this uninhabited place that a chapel was erected to honor its memory, and that some houses were grouped around the building which was at the origin of the village of Saint-Méry, in the diocese of Paris. They decided to make a detour to go to the tomb of Saint Denis and stopped at Thomery. Mederic arrived in Paris. It was near the church of Saint-Pierre-des-Bois that he found refuge in a cell open day and night to the prayers of passers-by. He rested his body broken by fatigue and illness. There, living in recluse, he served God for two years and nine months after having accomplished with joy the purpose of his pilgrimage and kneeling in the church of the Abbey of Saint-Germain-des-Prés at the tomb of the illustrious abbot of the Abbey of St. Symphorian of Autun.

Feeling his coming end, the 18th of the calends of September, he died in peace surrounded by many of his disciples. He was buried in St. Peter's Chapel. His tomb was the object of true veneration as miracles took place and Charles the Bald established a cult in his honor. This church was later too small and, falling into ruins, it was rebuilt and transformed into a basilica by Odon the Falconer. Thibert, priest in 884, solicited Gozlin, bishop of Paris, to translate it.

The bones of the saint were raised and placed above the altar in a silver shrine enriched with precious stones and supported by two angels. Adalard, former Count of Autun, made for the occasion rich gifts to the new church which was placed under the name of St. Peter and St. Merry. The Abbey of Champeaux, formerly illustrated by its presence, received a portion of its relics; the abbey of St. Martin in Autun founded a solemn Mass in his honor. Left alone, Frodulphe returned to St. Martin.

== Veneration ==
The Church of Saint-Merri in Paris is named after him.
