= Annie Louise Tanner-Musin =

American soprano singer

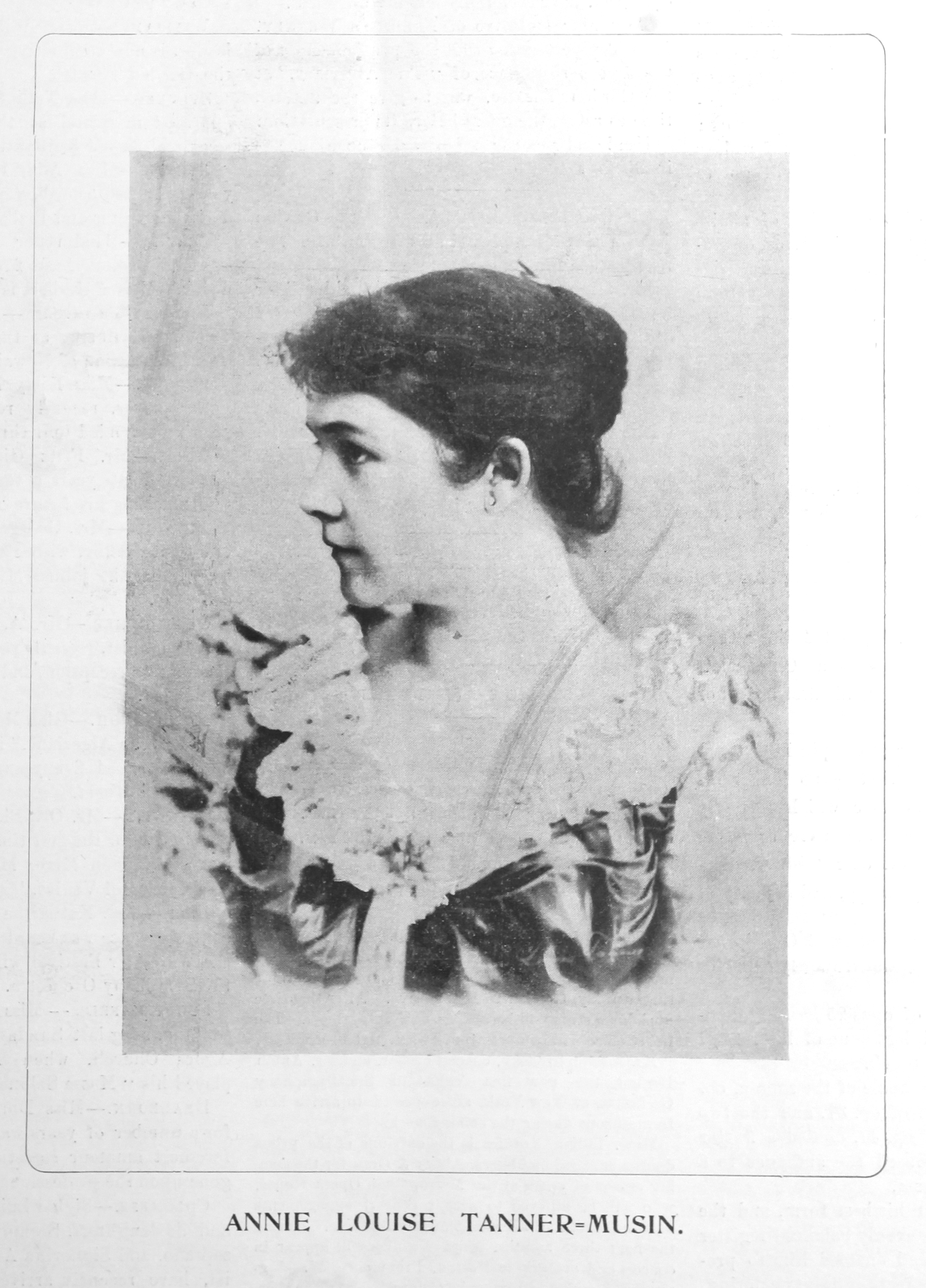
- Annie Louise Tanner-Musin on the cover of Freund's Weekly
- Born: 1856; Oshkosh, Wisconsin, US
- Died: 1921 (aged 64–65); New York City, US
- Other name: Annie Louise Hodges-Musin
- Known for: coloratura soprano singing
- Spouse(s): Wells B. Tanner, Ovide Musin

Annie Louise Tanner-Musin (née Annie Louise Hodges 1856 - February 28, 1921) was a coloratura soprano prima donna singer based in New York City.

Tanner-Musin's voice was said to span three octaves and was described as "clear as crystal, fresh as a rose-bud, and which can be compared only to a magic flute." She sang on her own at private clubs and later primarily with the Ovide Musin Concert Company with her husband Ovide Musin who played violin. The two performed together in the U.S. for at least six seasons.

The company traveled extensively including two tours of Europe, two tours Mexico and visits to Australia, New Zealand, and Japan. They toured the world for over a decade, despite Tanner-Musin's claustrophobia and sea sickness which made boat travel difficult.

== Personal life ==
Tanner-Musin was the daughter of Alexander Phelps Hodges and Adelaine Felton. She married Wells B. Tanner on October 17, 1878 in Batavia, New York; he died in 1885. She married Ovide Musin in New York City in 1891. He always referred to her formally as Annie Louise Hodges-Musin.
