= Saint-Séverin-en-Condroz =

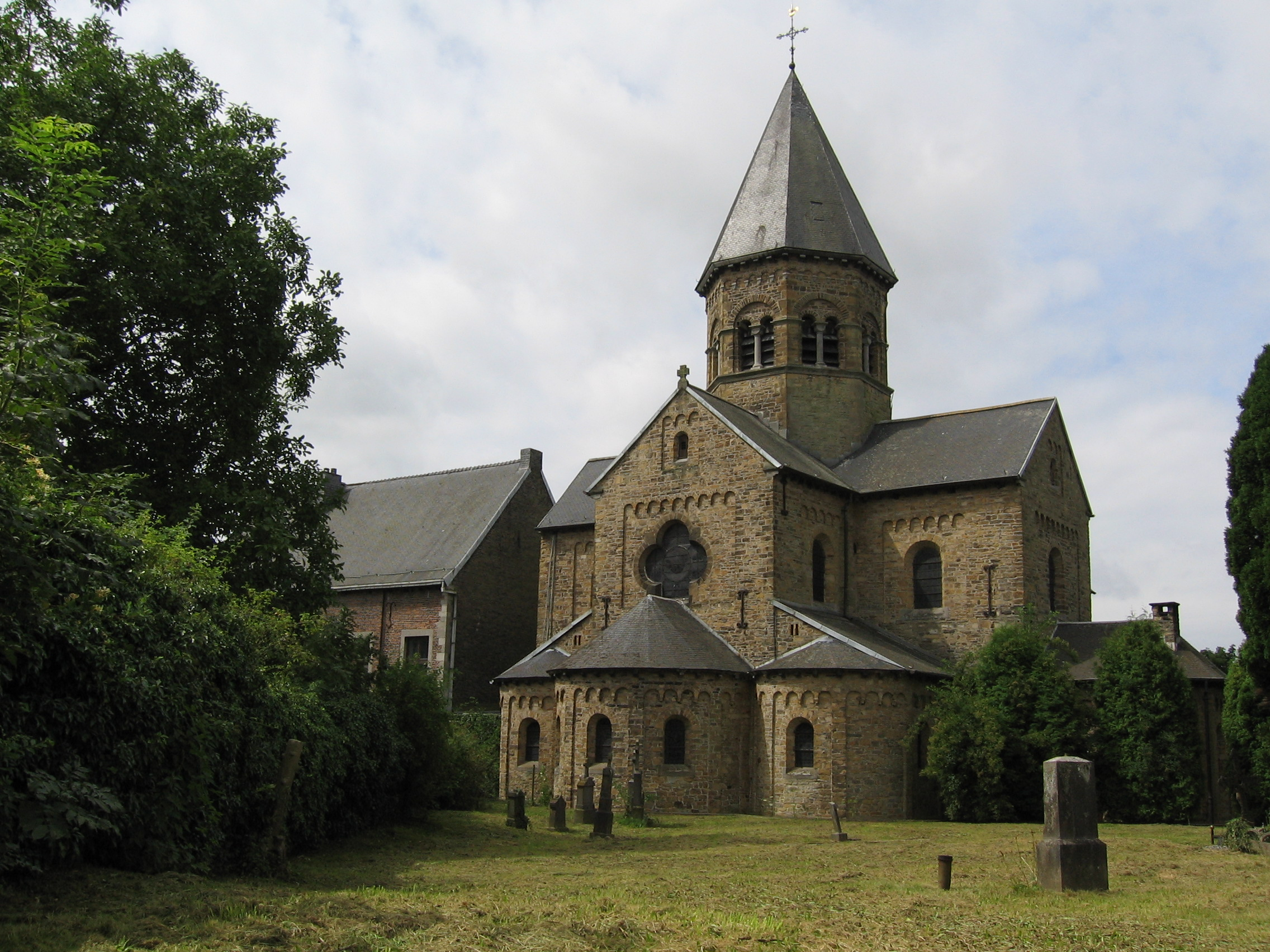
- Church of Saint Peter and Saint Paul, Saint-Séverin-en-Condroz

- Location within Belgium Location within Europe
- Coordinates: 50°31′49″N 05°24′42″E
- Country: Belgium
- Region: Wallonia
- Province: Liège
- Municipality: Nandrin

Saint-Séverin-en-Condroz (French pronunciation: [sɛ̃ sevʁɛ̃ ɑ̃ kɔ̃dʁo], lit. 'Saint Séverin in Condroz') is a village and district of the municipality of Nandrin, located in the province of Liège in Wallonia, Belgium.

The village grew up around a Cluniac priory, formed in 1091. The priory was later ceded to the Prince-Bishopric of Liège and later the Jesuits, before being suppressed in 1773. The Cluniac monks also built the current, unusually well-preserved Romanesque village church, the Church of Saint Peter and Saint Paul, Saint-Séverin-en-Condroz.
