= Saint-Symphorien =

Saint Symphorien or Saint-Symphorian may refer to:

== Places ==
=== Belgium ===
- Saint-Symphorien, Belgium

=== France ===
- Saint-Symphorien, Cher
- Saint-Symphorien, Deux-Sèvres
- Saint-Symphorien, Eure
- Saint-Symphorien, Gironde
- Saint-Symphorien, Lozère
- Saint-Symphorien, Sarthe
- Saint-Symphorien-d'Ancelles, in the Saône-et-Loire departement
- Saint-Symphorien-de-Lay, in the Loire departement
- Saint-Symphorien-de-Mahun, in the Ardèche departement
- Saint-Symphorien-de-Marmagne, in the Saône-et-Loire departement
- Saint-Symphorien-des-Bois, in the Saône-et-Loire departement
- Saint-Symphorien-des-Bruyères, in the Orne departement
- Saint-Symphorien-des-Monts, in the Manche departement
- Saint-Symphorien-de-Thénières, in the Aveyron departement
- Saint-Symphorien-d'Ozon, in the Rhône departement
- Saint-Symphorien-le-Château, in the Eure-et-Loir departement
- Saint-Symphorien-le-Valois, in the Manche departement
- Saint-Symphorien-sous-Chomérac, in the Ardèche departement
- Saint-Symphorien-sur-Coise, in the Rhône departement
- Saint-Symphorien-sur-Couze, in the Haute-Vienne departement
- Saint-Symphorien-sur-Saône, in the Côte-d'Or departement

== Other uses ==
- Saint Symphorian (Latin: Symphorianus), a Christian saint
- Stade Saint-Symphorien, a stadium in Metz, France
- St Symphorien Military Cemetery near Mons, Belgium
