= Ovide Musin =

Belgian violinist, professor, and composer

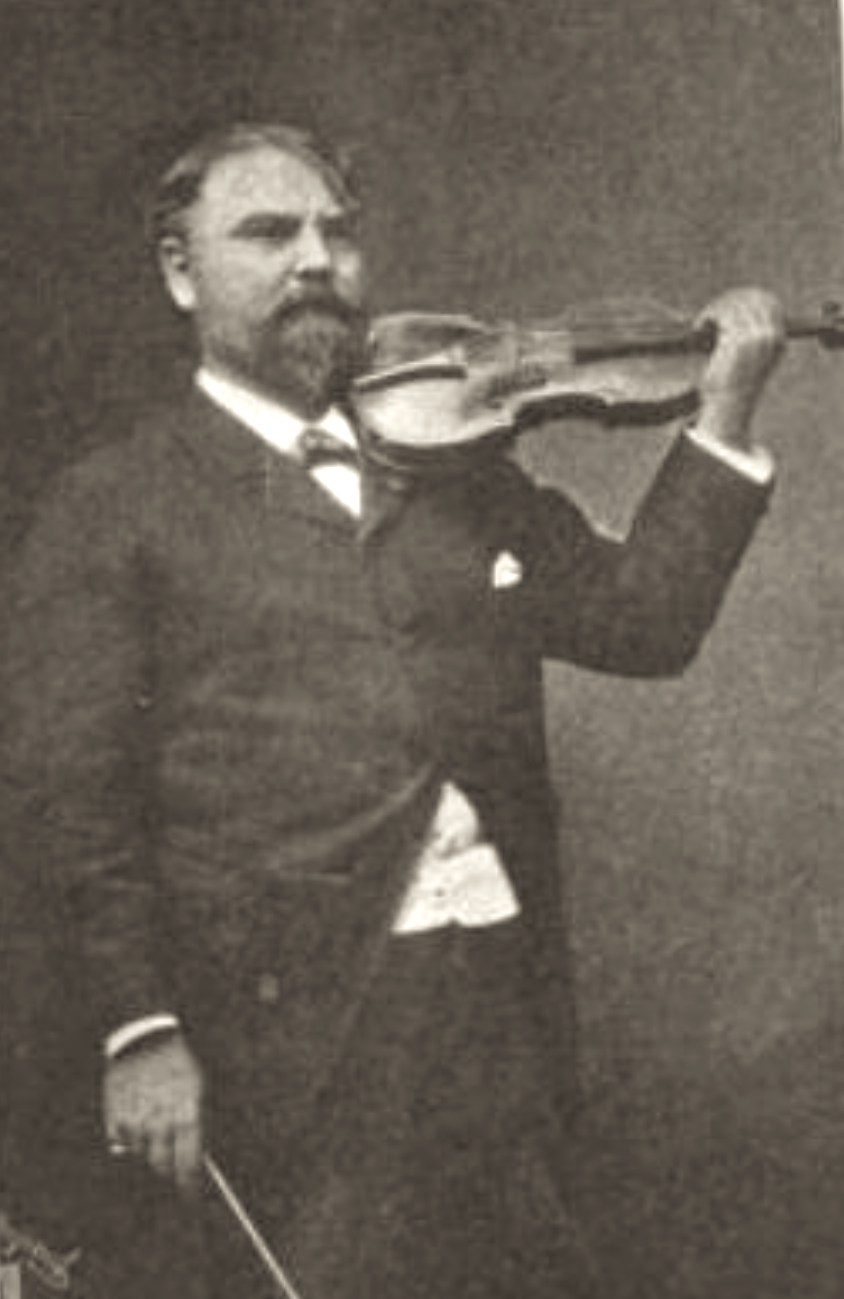
- Born: September 22, 1854; Nandrin, Belgium
- Died: November 25, 1929 (aged 75); New York
- Occupations: Violinist and composer
- Spouse: Annie Louise Tanner (m. 1891)

Ovide Musin (September 22, 1854 – November 25, 1929) was a Belgian violinist and composer.

== Life ==
Musin was born in Nandrin, Belgium in 1854. He started learning violin at the age of six.

In 1891, he married Annie Louise Tanner.

He died in New York in the year 1929.

== Career ==
In 1884, Musin gave his first concert in America. He then went on a tour of the United States, during which he performed in many cities.

In 1898, he returned to Belgium, where he was appointed as a professor at the Brussels conservatory where he himself had studied.

== Bibliography ==
His autobiography, entitled My Memories, is an important source for his life and career.
