= Berecynthia =

Epithet of the goddess Cybele

Berecynthia (Ancient Greek: Βερεκυνθία) was one of the many epithets of the goddess Cybele, which was derived either from Mount Berecynthus (modern Malaxa Mountain), or from a fortified place of that name in Phrygia, where she was particularly worshipped and known to have a thriving cult. It was also sometimes described as an epithet of Rhea.

Mount Berecynthus itself derived its name from a priest of Cybele named Berecynthus. The 5th-century mythographer Fabius Planciades Fulgentius gave an etymology relating the name to "spring flowers".

She was widely worshipped, with a particular ardency in Gaul, where she came to be assimilated and identified with a Celtic protectress of crops. Sixth-century writer Gregory of Tours, the "father of French history", describes her wide worship, and particular rites where an image of the goddess was carried through the fields and vineyards on a cart, to ensure a healthy harvest. The hagiography of the Christian Saint Symphorian describes Symphorian as refusing to pay respect to this image of Berecynthia carried in procession, and being executed for this sacrilege. In the 5th century CE, Augustine of Hippo wrote in his The City of God of witnessing similar processions and rites for Berecynthia as far away as North Africa.

Berecynthia figures as one of the main characters in 17th century librettist Aurelio Aureli's libretto L'Erginda .. Under this name, she was a regular fixture in European poetry and opera up through the 18th century.
