= Symphorian and Timotheus =

Christian martyrs

Saints Symphorian and Timotheus
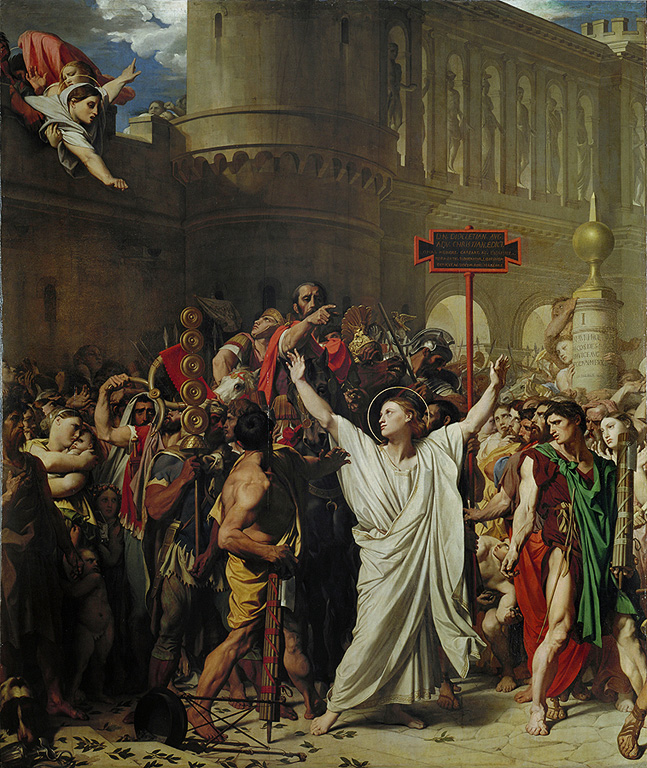
- The Martyrdom of Saint Symphorian, by Jean-Auguste-Dominique Ingres

Martyrs
- Died: August 22, 178
- Venerated in: Roman Catholic Church; Eastern Orthodox Church
- Canonized: Pre-Congregation
- Major shrine: Autun
- Feast: August 22; Hippolytus: now August 13
- Attributes: Symphorian is depicted as a young man being dragged to martyrdom while his mother encourages him.
- Patronage: Symphorian is patron of Autun; children; students; against eye problems, against syphilis

Symphorian is also the name of one of the Four Crowned Martyrs. For various places in France and Belgium, see Saint-Symphorien.

Symphorian (Symphorianus, Symphorien), Timotheus (Timothy), and Hippolytus of Rome are three Christian martyrs who, though they were unrelated and were killed in different places and at different times, shared a common feast day in the General Roman Calendar from at least the 1568 Tridentine calendar to the Mysterii Paschalis. While still a young man, Symphorian was either beheaded or beaten to death with clubs.

== Symphorian ==
According to a legendary passio of St. Benignus of Dijon, Symphorian was a young nobleman who was converted by Benignus at Autun. Symphorian was beheaded, while still a young man, during the reign of Marcus Aurelius.

He was the son of a senator named Faustus. He studied at Autun and was brought before the provincial governor Heraclius for not worshipping the pagan goddess Berecynthia (an epithet of Cybele), by failing to show due reverence when a procession during her festival was passing by. Symphorian is said to have asked for tools to destroy the statue. He was arrested and flogged and, because he was from a noble family, he was given a chance to recant but refused.

His mother, the Blessed Augusta, encouraged him on his way to execution and was present at her son's death, which took place on 22 August 178. In the oldest redaction of manuscripts containing the saint's life is a Gaulish sentence recording that she allegedly yelled from the city wall: Nate, Nate, Symphoriane, mentobeto to Diuo which may be read as "gnate, gnate, mentobe to diwo" ("Son, Son, O Symphorian, remember your God!"). Symphorian was beaten to death with clubs.

=== Veneration ===
Bishop Euphronius of Autun (died 490) built a handsome church over Symphorian's grave, connected with a monastery, the Abbey of St. Symphorian, which belonged to the Congregation of Sainte-Geneviève from 1656 until its suppression in 1791. Abbot Germanus later became Bishop of Paris, where he dedicated a chapel to the saint. Genesius of Clermont built a church dedicated to him at Clermont.

Saint Symphorian is the patron saint of Autun. His veneration spread at an early date through the empire of the Franks. His cult was especially popular at Tours; Saint Gregory of Tours relates a miracle performed by the saint.

There is a St. Symphorian's Church at Veryan, Cornwall, and another at Durrington in West Sussex, now a suburb of the town of Worthing.

== Timotheus ==
During the pontificate of Melchiades (311–13), St. Timotheus came from Antioch to Rome, where he preached for fifteen months and lived with Sylvester, who later became pope. The prefect of the city, Tarquinus Perpenna, threw him into prison, tortured, and finally beheaded him at the Via Ostiense in 311. A Christian woman named Theon buried him in her garden. This is related in the legend of Sylvester. The name of Timotheus occurs in the earliest martyrologies.

== Hippolytus ==
The 22 August feast of Saint Hippolytus of Rome was a duplicate of his 13 August feast and for that reason was deleted when the General Roman Calendar was revised in 1969. Earlier editions of the Roman Martyrology referred to the 22 August Hippolytus as Bishop of Porto. Johann Peter Kirsch, writing in the Catholic Encyclopedia, sees this as "connected with the confusion regarding the Roman presbyter resulting from the Acts of the Martyrs of Porto. It has not been ascertained whether the memory of the latter was localized at Porto merely in connection with the legend in Prudentius, without further foundation, or whether a person named Hippolytus was really martyred at Porto, and afterwards confounded in legend with Hippolytus of Rome." This opinion is shared by a Benedictine source.

== See also ==
- Saint Symphorian, patron saint archive
