= Villers-le-Temple =

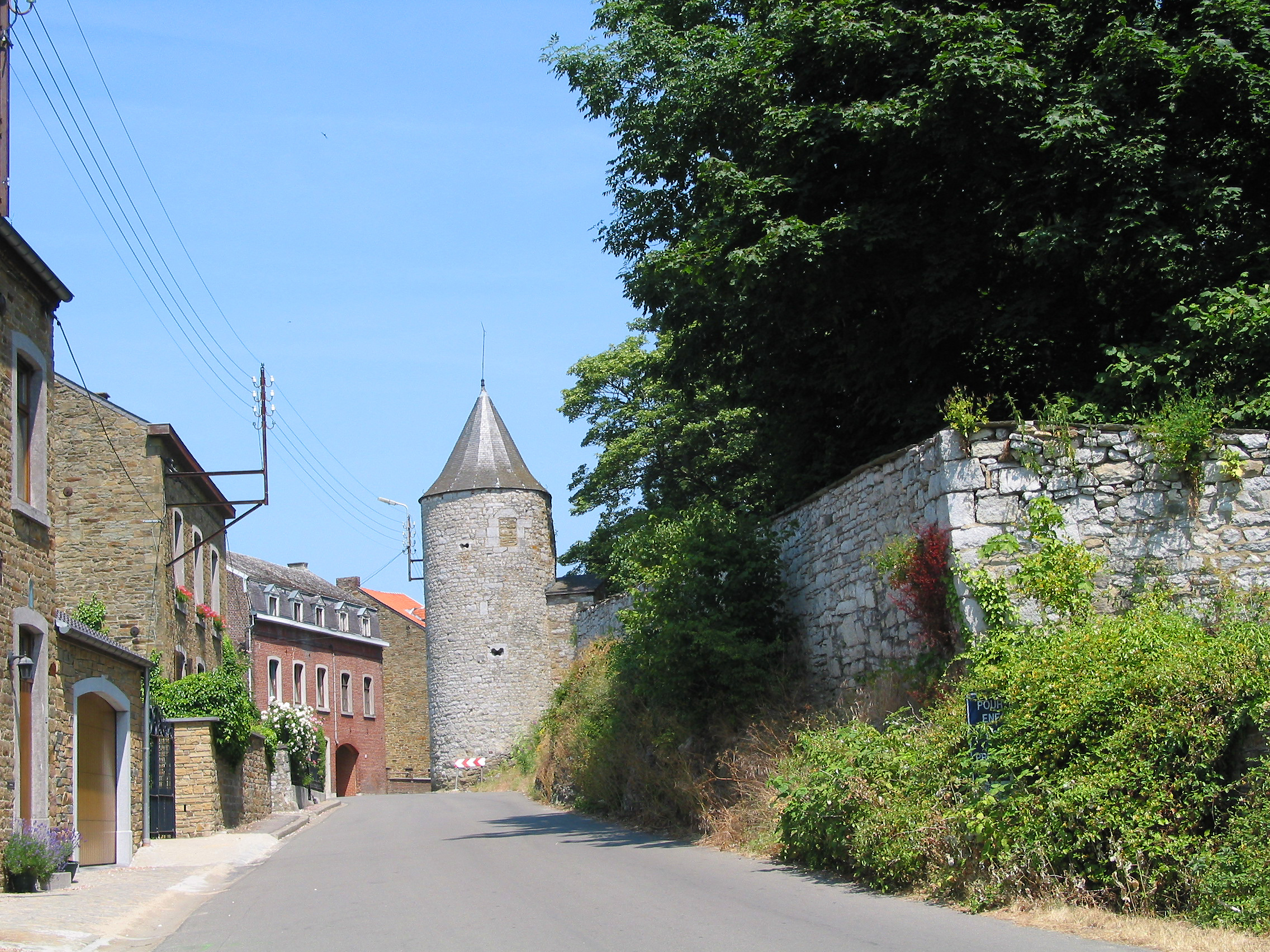
- Villers-le-Temple

- Location within Belgium Location within Europe
- Coordinates: 50°30′30″N 05°22′12″E
- Country: Belgium
- Region: Wallonia
- Province: Liège
- Municipality: Nandrin

Villers-le-Temple is a village and district of the municipality of Nandrin, located in the province of Liège in Wallonia, Belgium.

The location has been inhabited at least since the Neolithic and the village derives its name from a Roman villa that was located here. During the Middle Ages, the village belonged to the Knights Templar until their suppression in 1313. It then passed to the Order of Malta, which retained the village until 1795.There are still substantial remains of the medieval commandery of the Templars in the village. The chancel of the village church is also medieval, Late Gothic from the 16th century, while much of the rest of the building is from the 17th century. There is also a manor (Manoir de la Tour) traceable to the 14th century in the village.
