= Abbey of Saint-Symphorien, Autun =

Abbey in Saône-et-Loire, France

Coordinates: 46.9681°N 4.3150°E

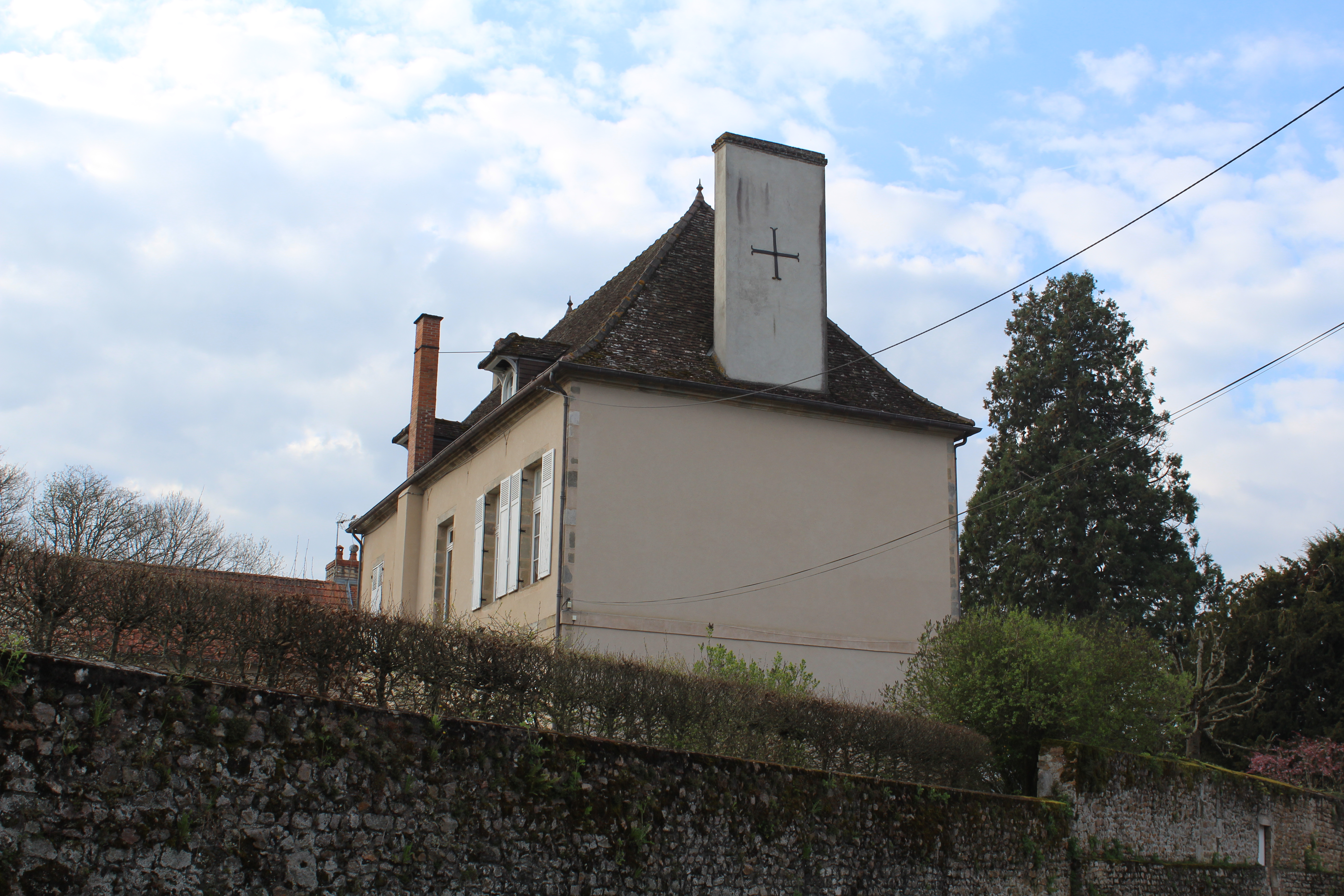
Building on the former abbey site

The Abbey of St. Symphorian, Autun, (French: Abbaye Saint-Symphorien d'Autun) is a former abbey, later a priory, of Benedictine monks located outside the walls of Autun in Burgundy, France.

== History ==
The abbey was named after Saint Symphorianus of Autun, a 2nd-century martyr, and was founded by Saint Euphronius, bishop of Autun, in the 5th century; its existence is attested in 452. It was attached to the Abbey of St. Martin, Autun, in 910, of which it later became a priory.

The monastery was rebuilt in the 17th century. It was suppressed in the French Revolution and the surviving premises are now privately owned. It was listed as a monument historique in 1993 for its buildings and given classified status in 1994 for the perimeter wall.

Saint Germain of Paris (d. 576) was abbot here, as was Virgilius of Arles (d. October 610).

Saint Marius of Avenches, bishop of Lausanne in the 6th century, was from the region of Autun and was believed to have been educated here. Saint Eustace of Bourges (d. 607) trained here before becoming archdeacon of Autun and later Archbishop of Bourges.

Among the abbey's properties was the priory church of Saint-Symphorien in Champagne-en-Valromey (1055), in the deanery of Ceysserieu.
