= Saint-Germain de Charonne, Paris =

Catholic church in eastern Paris

Saint-Germain de Charonne
- Église du Saint-Esprit
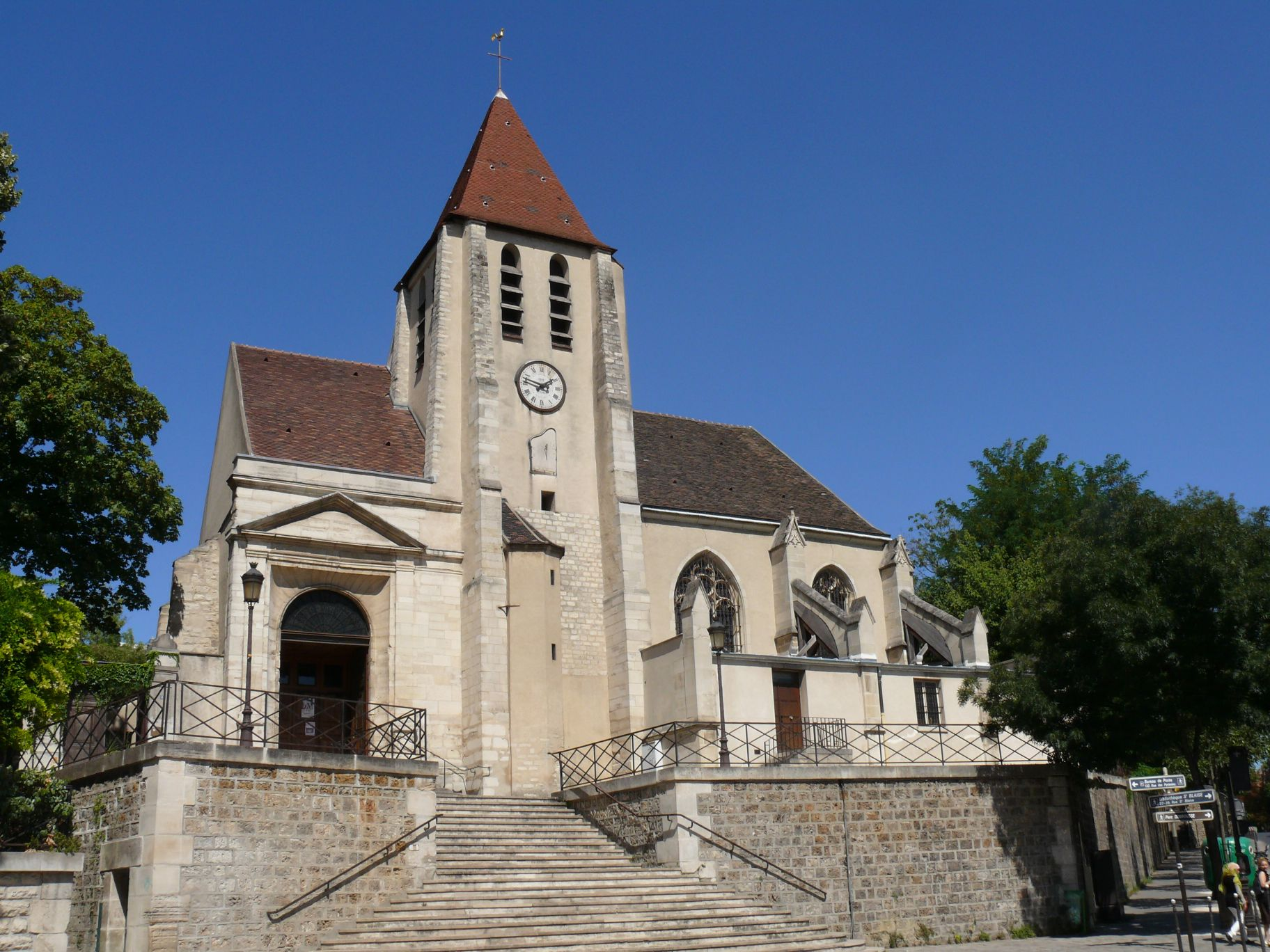
- South-facing façade

- Location within Paris
- 48.860500°N 2.404000°E
- Location: 4, place Saint-Blaise, 20th arrondissement, Paris
- Country: France
- Denomination: Roman Catholic
- Website: https://www.saintgermaindecharonne.fr

History
- Status: Active
- Founded: 12th century

Architecture
- Style: Mix of styles dating from 12th to 18th centuries

Administration
- Archdiocese: Paris

The Saint-Germain de Charonne church is a religious building and operational parish church located at 4, place Saint-Blaise in the Père-Lachaise district on the edge of the Charonne district in the 20th arrondissement of Paris.

== History ==
According to tradition, around the year 430, Saint Germain of Paris, then bishop of Auxerre, met a young girl from Nanterre, the future patroness of Paris, Saint Geneviève. Legend has it that the church was erected by the inhabitants of the place in honor of this meeting on the hillside of the village of Charonne.

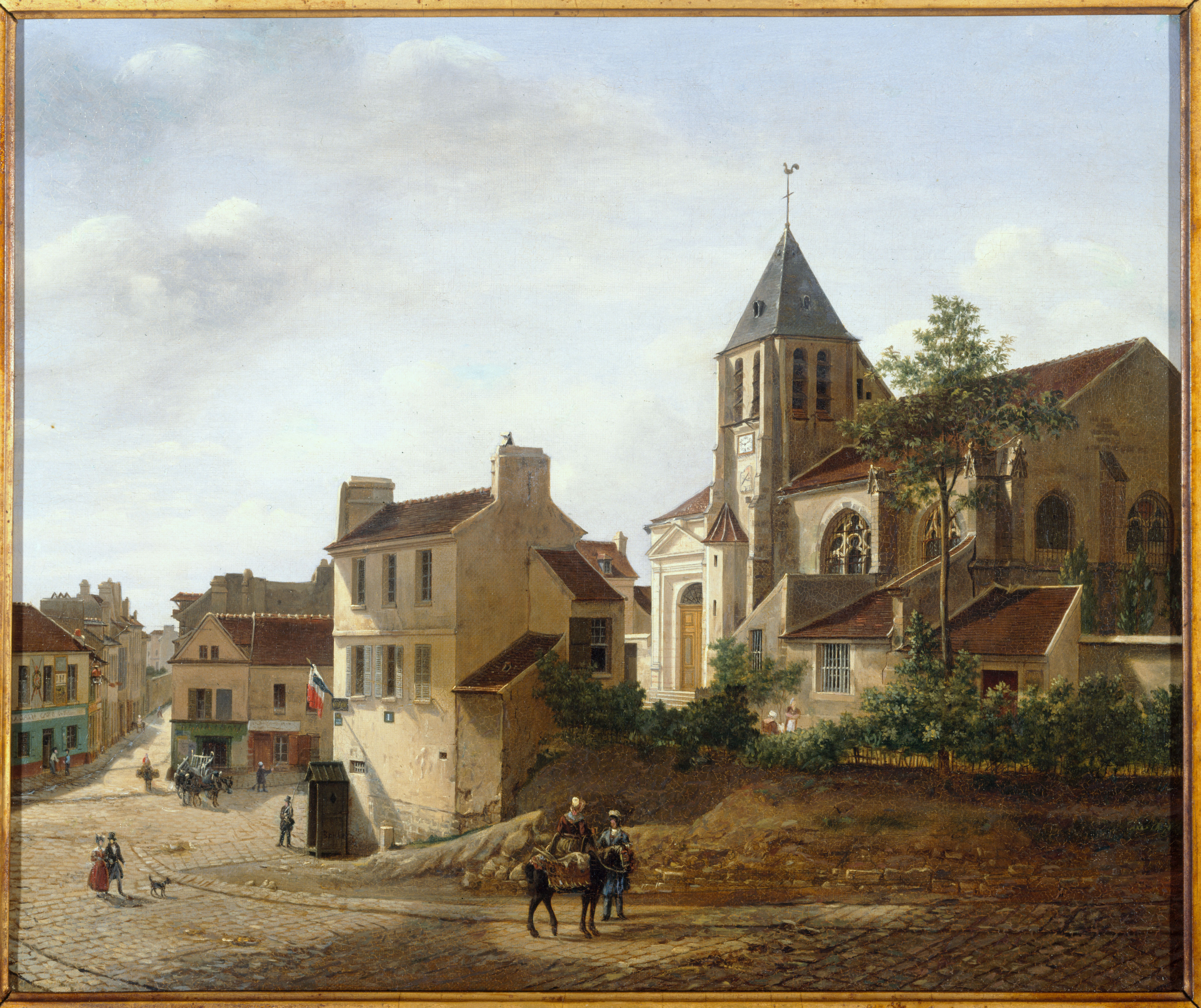
Painting of the church by Étienne Bouhot, circa 1860

The first church on the site, a modest edifice, can be dated to the 12th century. The church was rebuilt in the 13th century and then rebuilt again in the 15th century. It was dedicated in 1460 by Guillaume VI Chartier, bishop of Paris.

A fire in the 17th century destroyed the west facade and 2 spans of the nave. In 1737, the facade was redone (the one that is visible today). A new entry was built on the south facade by adding another span to the nave. The date 1737 can be read on the keystone of the entryway.

Before 1860, the date of the village of Charonne's integration into the city of Paris, it was Charonne's parish church.

=== Architecture ===
Saint-Germain de Charonne harmoniously combines vestiges of the 12th century (the bell tower and its buttresses) with later architectural styles, mainly from the 15th and 18th centuries. Thus, the church embodies a montage of styles and cannot be attributed to any particular period.

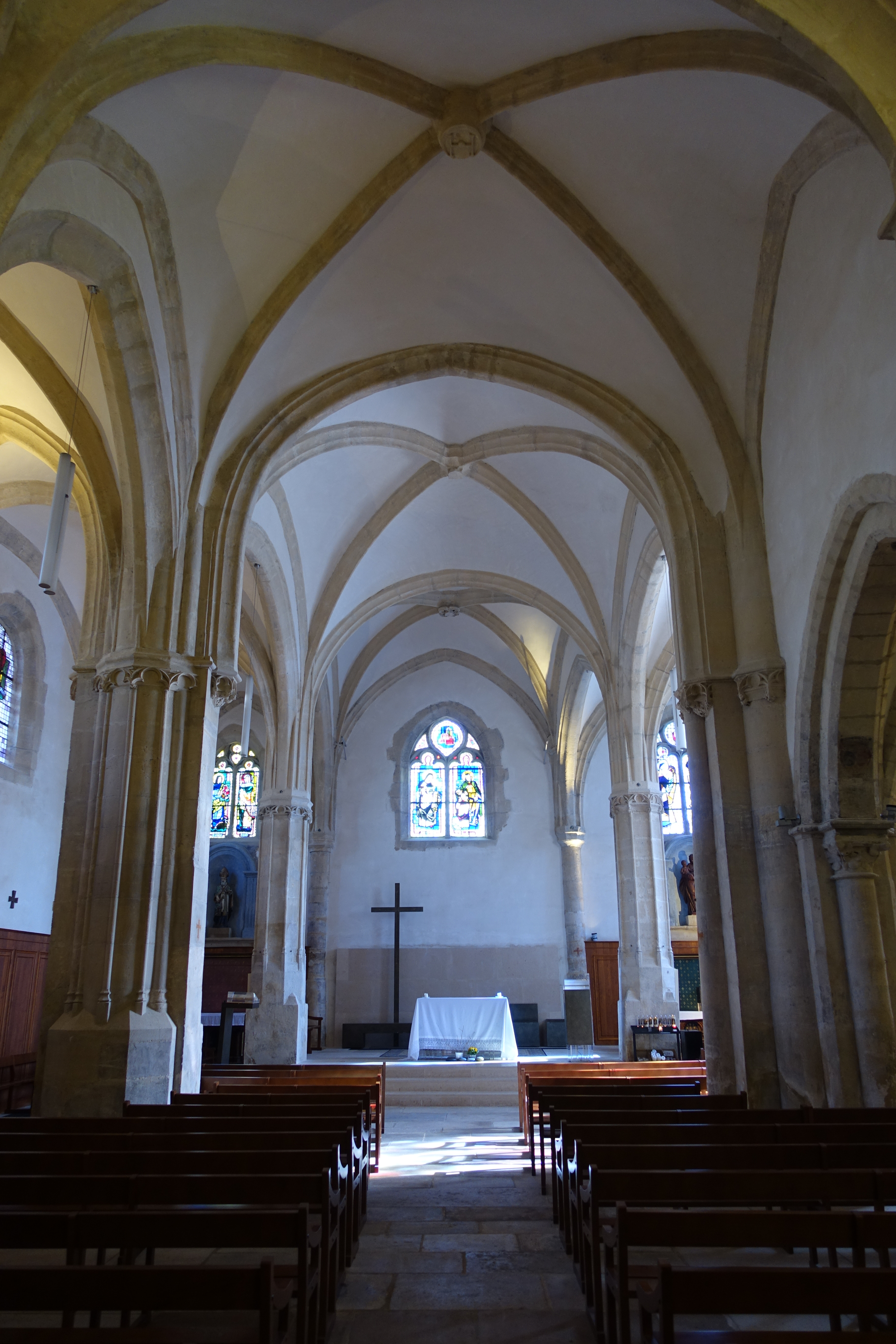
Interior of the church

The footprint of the church is rectangular. The interior is irregularly divided by 3 vaults and 4 spans of the nave. The apse is flat. Located on the south side of the church, the medieval bell tower has a 4-sided roof. The entryway is done in the classical style and is framed by 2 pilasters and a triangular pediment. Some of the exterior walls are supported by flying buttresses built during the 19th century. The support walls and the esplanade in front of the church were built in the 1930s.

The church sits on a layer of clay and the site is steeply sloped. As a result, it has always had problems with instability. In 2009, major cracks appeared in the masonry on the right side of the church and the church was immediately closed. Large-scale stabilization work, employing the technique of jet grouting, was subsequently undertaken, preceded by an archaeological excavation. The excavation revealed a mass burial ground from the Carolingian period as well as a semi-circular chevet from the second half of the 12th century. Around this chevet, 45 skeletons were found, half of which were of babies.

The renovation project began in 2014 and was completed in 2016.

== Historic monument status ==
The church was classified as a historical monument by the French Ministry of Culture on 23 May 1923.

== Church cemetery ==
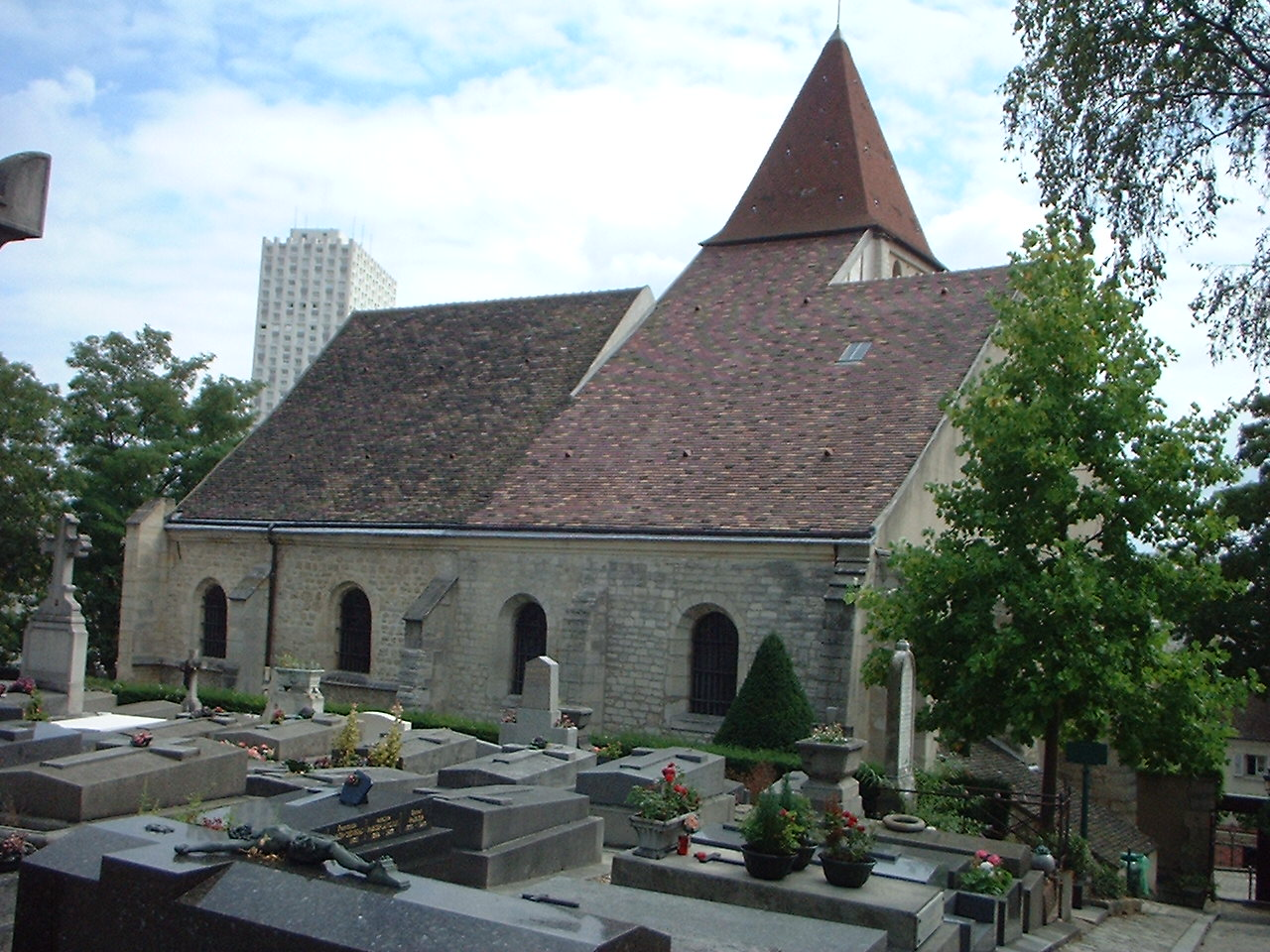
The church and its cemetery

Saint-Germain de Charonne is one of only 2 churches in Paris — along with the Saint-Pierre de Montmartre church — to still be bordered by its old cemetery (as in the Middle Ages). The cemetery of Saint-Germain de Charonne is thought to be as old as the church itself.

The cemetery escaped the provisions of the decree of 12 June 1804, which prohibited burials within towns and villages.

The cemetery — which became a municipal cemetery of the village of Charonne in 1791 — was expanded in 1845 and again in 1859. This gave it a capacity of more than 650 graves in less than half a hectare. It became a Parisian municipal cemetery when the village of Charonne was annexed to Paris in 1860. It is now part the same administration as the Père-Lachaise cemetery.

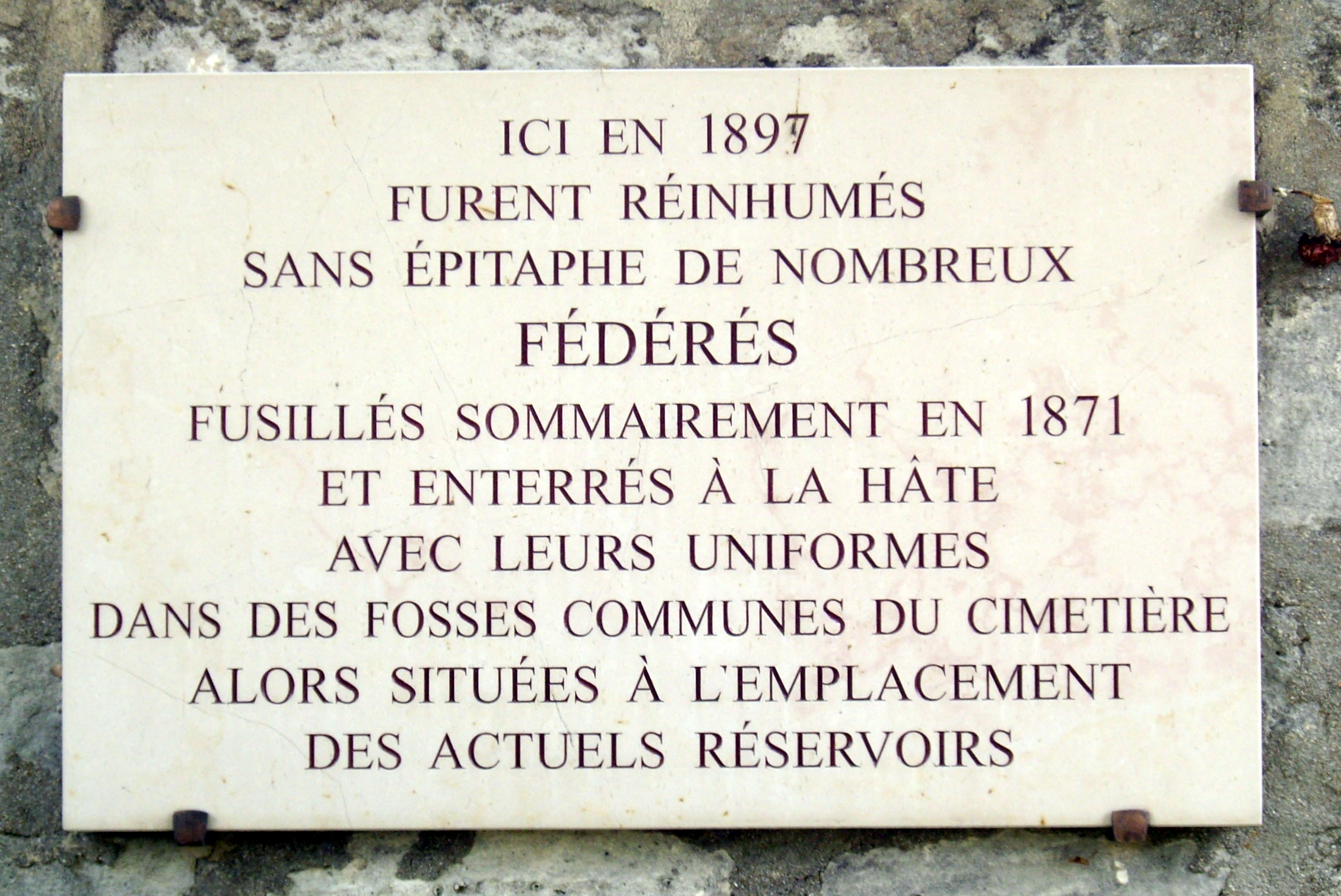
The memorial plaque for the fédérés in the Charonne cemetery

During the demolition of the annex to the cemetery in 1897, nearly eight hundred skeletons were discovered, still clothed in military uniforms. Examination of the uniform buttons allowed these remains to be identified as those of fédérés — soldiers who fought with the insurrection of the Paris Commune — who were summarily shot and hastily buried in May 1871. In 1897, their remains were reinterred — again in an unmarked mass grave — along the wall on the south side of the current cemetery. A commemorative plaque has since been placed there.

The first listing of the cemetery as a historical monument took place on 18 September 1964.

== Popular culture ==
This church is famous because of its prominent role in the final scenes of the cult film, Les Tontons flingueurs (literally, "The Gun-Toting Uncles"). During the wedding sequence, the audience sees the surrounding neighborhood of Paris (the Saint-Blaise district) as well as the interior of the church. In the scene of the "kneeling uncles", the left part of the painting by Joseph-Benoît Suvée, the Meeting of Saint Germain and Saint Geneviève, is visible in the background. The very last scene of the movie — in which a car is blown up — takes place at the base of the stairs leading up to the church's entryway.

== See also ==
- List of historic churches in Paris
