= Nandrin =

Municipality in Liège Province, Wallonia, Belgium

Nandrin Nandrin (Walloon)
- Municipality
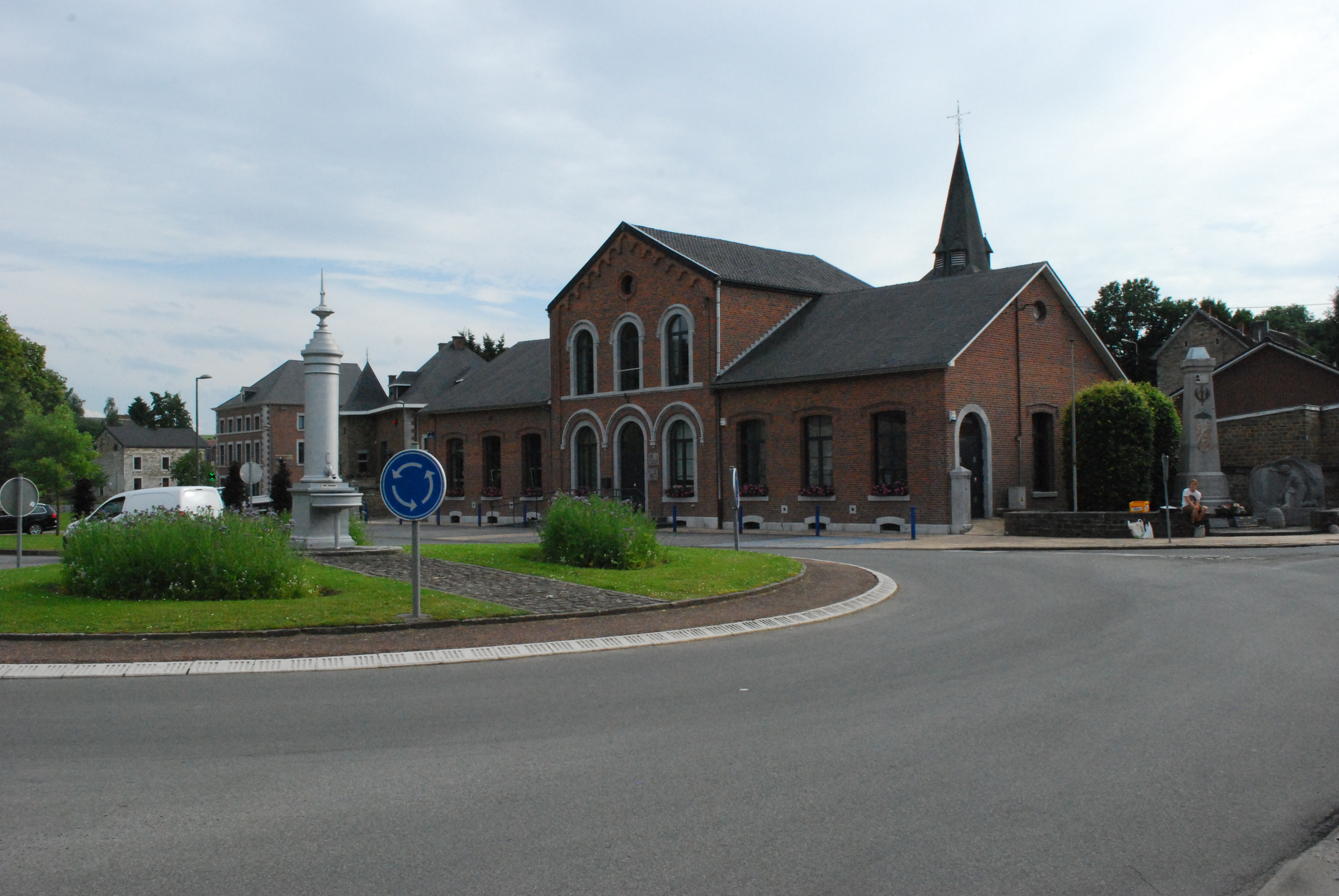
- Centre of Nandrin

- Flag Coat of arms

- Location of Nandrin in the province of Liège
- Interactive map of Nandrin
- Location in Belgium
- Coordinates: 50°30′N 05°25′E
- Country: Belgium
- Community: French Community
- Region: Wallonia
- Province: Liège
- Arrondissement: Huy

Government
  - Mayor: Michel Lemmens (PS)
  - Governing party: Bourgmestre + - Ecolo

Area
  - Total: 36.13 km^{2} (13.95 sq mi)

Population (2018-01-01)
  - Total: 5,826
  - Density: 161.3/km^{2} (417.6/sq mi)
- Postal codes: 4550
- NIS code: 61043
- Area codes: 04, 085
- Website: www.nandrin.be

Nandrin (French pronunciation: [nɑ̃dʁɛ̃]) is a municipality of Wallonia located in the province of Liège, Belgium.

On January 1, 2006, Nandrin had a total population of 5,539. The total area is 35.90 km^{2} which gives a population density of 154 inhabitants per km^{2}.

The municipality consists of the following districts: Nandrin, Saint-Séverin-en-Condroz, Villers-le-Temple, and Yernée-Fraineux.

== Notable residents ==
- Ovide Musin (1854–1929), violinist and composer, born in Nandrin

== See also ==
- List of protected heritage sites in Nandrin
