= Abbey of St Martin, Autun =

Abbey in Saône-et-Loire, France

Coordinates: 46.96°N 4.307°E

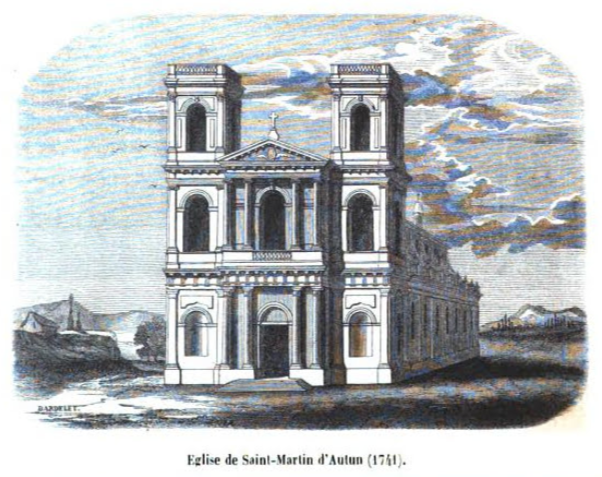
Church of the Abbey of St Martin, Autun 1741

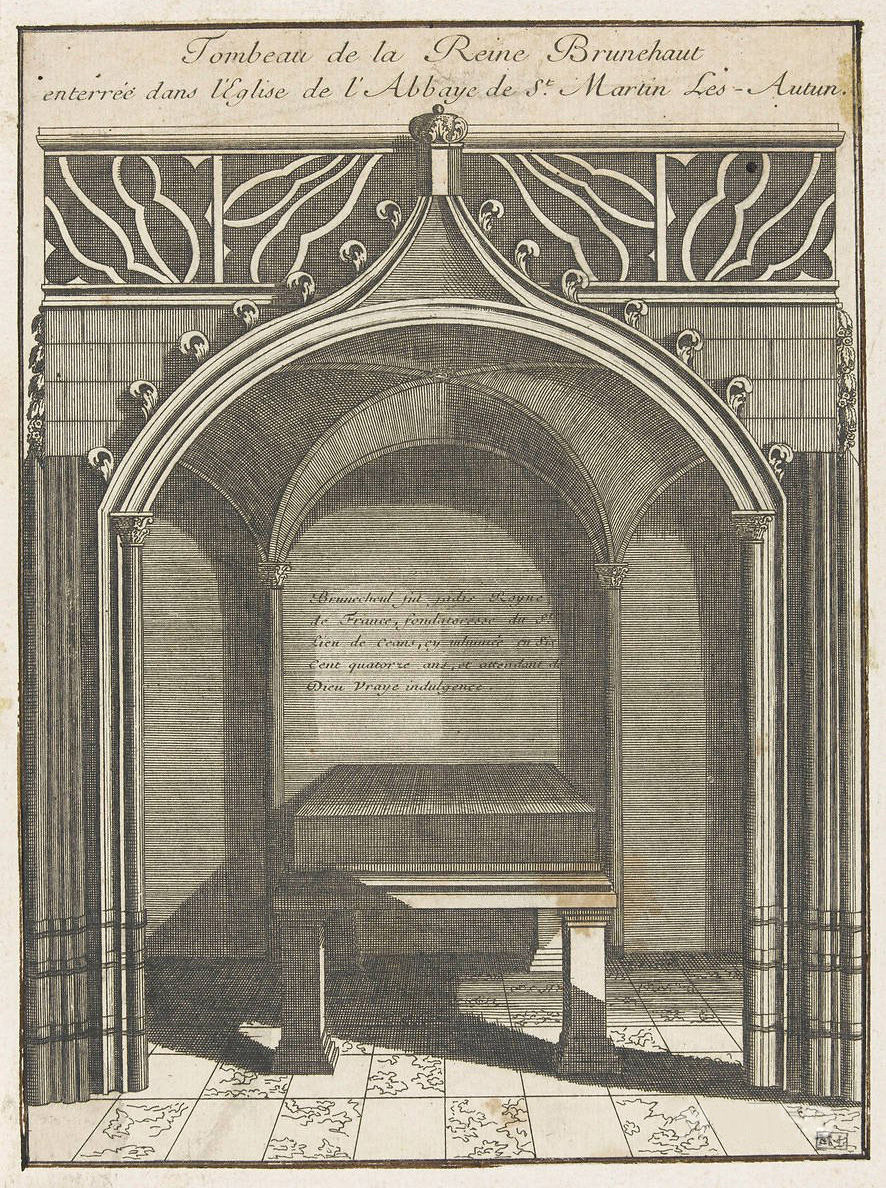
Tomb of Brunhilda in the abbey church before 1790 (early 19th-century engraving by Alexandre Lenoir)

The Abbey of St. Martin is a former Benedictine monastery in Autun, Saône-et-Loire, France, to the northeast of the city just outside the city walls, on the right bank of the Arroux and to the north of the Roman road from Autun to Langres, Beaune and Besançon.

== History ==
The abbey was founded by Queen Brunhilda and the bishop of Autun, Saint Syagrius, in or around 589. Brunhilda was later buried there. The new foundation was richly decorated and furnished, largely with marbles, mosaics and other items which Brunhilde took from neighbouring Gallo-Roman buildings. The abbey was however largely destroyed in 731 by invading Saracens. It was not rebuilt until 870, and then destroyed again in 880, doubtless by the Normans. It was rebuilt again in 885 by Charles the Fat.

From 1058 it answered directly to the pope rather than to a bishop.

At the latest from the time of this rebuilding, the abbey was also fortified. In 1570, it was pillaged by the troops of Admiral de Coligny, the fortifications having fallen into disrepair. In 1589 the États de Bourgogne refused financial help to Nicolas Brulard, the then commendatory abbot, for the repair of the fortifications. The abbey was deserted soon afterwards and occupied by bandits: once they were expelled the fortifications were dismantled and the abbey left empty.

The vacant and dilapidated premises were taken over by the reformist Congregation of St Maur in 1635 (or 1654), who repaired them, but not the fortifications.

The abbey was entirely rebuilt between 1740 and 1752. It was suppressed in the French Revolution and sold off as national property in 1793, to be used as an armaments factory. A few years later it was almost entirely demolished apart from a few service buildings. The city authorities of Autun eventually acquired what remained and undertook restoration in 1976–77. The renovated buildings now operate under the name "Prieuré Saint-Martin" as a local government social centre, with rooms for hire.
