= Vespasian (name) =

Vespasian (9–79) was the emperor of Rome from 69 to 79.

Vespasian or Vespasien is also the name of:

- Vespasien Gribaldi, archbishop of Vienne (1569–1575) - see Roman Catholic Archdiocese of Vienne
- Vespasian Pella (1897–1960), Romanian legal expert and ambassador to Switzerland during World War II
- Vespasien Robin (1579–1662), son of Jean Robin (botanist), and like his father, botanist to the King of France
- Vespasian Warner (1842–1925), US representative from Illinois
- José Vespasien (born 1976), French basketball player

== See also ==
- Stele of Vespasian, a stele found in an ancient Georgian capital
- Cotton Vespasian manuscripts, part of the Cotton library, named for the emperor's bust above the original bookcase; see List of manuscripts in the Cotton library#Vespasian
  - Vespasian Psalter, an 8th century manuscript in the Cotton collection
- Vespasiano, a Brazilian municipality
- Vespasiano (given name), a list of people
- Wespazjan Kochowski (born 1633), Polish writer
- Pissoir, also called in French a vespasienne, a public urinal
