= Council of Albi =

The Roman Catholic Council of Albi was held in 1254 by Louis IX of France on his return from the Seventh Crusade, under the presidency of Zoen, Bishop of Avignon and Papal Legate for the final repression of the Albigenses, the reformation of clergy and people and the Catholic church's relation to the Jewish people.

Along with the Councils of Narbonne in 1227 and 1243, the Council of Toulouse, the Councils of Béziers in 1232 and 1246, the 1242 Council of Tarragona, and the 1248 Council of Valence, this council established a body of legislative precedent for the Inquisition.

== Rulings ==
Rulings enacted by the Council of Albi included the following:

- a decree banning monks from wearing deep brown or mulberry robes, and requiring canons regular to wear plain black or white
- a decree ordering the seizure of the property of all those the Inquisition condemned to prison for heresy
- a ban on Jews selling meat in public marketplaces
- a requirement for officials to take an oath of support for the Inquisition every three years
- a requirement for duplicates of inquisitorial records to be archived
- a ban on Jewish people wearing wide cloaks, considered too similar to priestly garments
- a fine for failing to attend Mass on Sundays or leaving early, with exemptions for illness, distance, or other serious cause
- a ban on lawyers representing defendants at trials for heresy

The council's restrictions on usury, stricter than those established in previous canon law, ordered that:

- neither secular nor ecclesiastical judges should compel debtors to pay usury
- Jews should be required to swear on the Torah when testifying about whether a loan included usury
- restrictions on usury should be applied to all loans, including those between Jews
