= Paschasius of Vienne =

Bishop of Vienne, France

Saint Paschasius of Vienne (French: Paschase) was a bishop of Vienne in the Dauphiné, France, in the early fourth century. He is venerated as a saint of the Catholic Church.

The various chronologies of the bishops of Vienne mostly place him between Saint Simplicius and Saint Claudius.

Paschasius is said to have been the recipient of a papal bull dating from approximately 322 from Pope Sylvester I (c. 314–335), which granted him supremacy over seven provinces, although the authenticity of this document has been called into question.

In the Chronicles of Archbishop Ado of Vienne (died 875), he writes that it was Paschasius who instigated the "first translation of the [relics of] saints Felician, Exuperius and Severinus", martyrs at Vienne under Marcus Aurelius. He further describes him as a very eloquent speaker ("vir dissertissimus") who was the teacher of Justus, the future bishop of Lyon.

His feast day is celebrated on 22 February.
