= Julian of Vienne =

Medieval French Bishop

Julian of Vienne (Latin: Julianus, French: Julien) was a bishop of Vienne in France of the first half of the sixth century, approximately between 520 and 530. He is venerated as a saint of the Catholic Church and attended a number of early church synods.

The 9th-century archbishop and chronicler Ado of Vienne places him as 18th bishop of Vienne, following Saint Avitus, who seems to have died between 518 and 525.

The Bishop Julianus that was present at the Council of Lyon, around 518-523, alongside Archbishop Viventiolus of Lyon, would be Julian of Vienne. Although the Vita of Saint Apollinaris placed Avitus at this council, Ulysse Chevalier argues that "the rank occupied by Julian after the metropolitan of Lyon and before Apollinaris, seems to indicate that it was he who was metropolitan of Vienne."

He appears as Julianus Episcopus at the second Council of Orlėans in 533 where he holds the 23rd rank among the subscribing bishops.

Considered a saint, Julian appears in the liturgical calendar of the diocese of Grenoble-Vienne on 1 July, alongside Saint Martin and all the former bishop saints of Vienne. In addition, he was listed in the Martyrologium Hieronymianum on 22 April, as well as by the Bollandists.

== Bibliography ==
- Chevalier, Ulysse (1879). Notice chronologico-historique sur les archevêques de Vienne: d'après des documents paléographiques inédits. Vienne.
- Chevalier, Ulysse (1912). Regeste dauphinois, ou Répertoire chronologique et analytique des documents imprimés et manuscrits relatifs à l'histoire du Dauphiné, des origines chrétiennes à l'année 1349 (Tome 1, Fascicules 1-3) (in French).
- Duchesne, Louis (1894). Fastes épiscopaux de l'ancienne Gaule. Provinces du Sud-Est (tome premier) (in French). Vol. 3. Paris: Thorin et fils.
- Gadille, Jacques; Fédou, René; Hours, Henri (1983). Le diocèse de Lyon (in French). Vol. 16. Paris: Beauchesne. ISBN 2-701-01066-7.
- Lucas, Gérard (2018). "Adon de Vienne, Chronique, principally the Tableau récapitulatif de la liste des évêques de Vienne jusqu'à Avit". Vienne dans les textes grecs et latins: Chroniques littéraires sur l'histoire de la cité, des Allobroges à la fin du Ve siècle de notre ère (in French). MOM Éditions. p. 247-270. ISBN 978-2-35668-185-0.
- Santschi, Catherine (2002). "Avit (saint)". Dictionnaire historique de la Suisse.
