= Nectarius of Vienne =

French saint and bishop

Nectarius (French: Nectaire) was a semi-legendary, if not spurious, bishop of Vienne believed to have lived in the 5th century. He is considered a pre-congregational saint of the Roman Catholic Church, and his feast day is locally celebrated on July 1 in the Diocese of Grenoble-Vienne.

== Biography ==
Little is known about him. Archbishop Ado, writing in the 9th century, placed him under the reign of Emperor Constantius II (337-361):

There also shone at that time Nectarius, bishop of Vienne, remarkable in the teaching of the faith, who presided over the venerable synod of Vaison, preached and taught publicly in his church that the nature of the Father and of the Son and of the Holy Spirit was One as well as their power, their divine essence and their virtue. (Adon de Vienne, Chronicle, VI.)

The historian Ulysse Chevalier (1879) partly takes up the tradition. The historian Louis Duchesne (1894), author of a study on the first bishops of Vienne, only mentions him in passing.

== Council of Vaison ==
Although Ulysse Chevalier supports the presence of Nectarius at the synod of Vaison, around 350, Claude Charvet, in his history of the church of Vienne (1761), says nothing of him.

Gérard Lucas states that "the Council of Vaison to which Ado refers is not retained in the list of councils established by C.J. Hefele, in his History of the Councils." Historically, only two councils were held at Vaison, the first in 442 and the second in 529. He concludes that "Ado himself is probably the origin of the confusion, in consequence of his false chronology", which he argues was composed by Ado to provide a "champion" bishop for the church in Vienne, of which he was himself archbishop.
