= Guillaume de Vienne =

French prelate

Guillaume de Vienne, sometimes identified as Guillaume VI de Vienne (died 18 February 1407), was a French prelate, archbishop of Rouen from 1389.

== Family ==
Originally from Burgundy, he was the son of Guillaume de Vienne, lord of Roulans, and his wife Claude (Marguerite) née de Chaudenay. One of his sisters, Jeanne, was the mother of Jean de Nant, archbishop of Vienne (1405–1423), then of Paris (1423–1426). Another sister, Marguerite, married, firstly, Robert de Saint-Beuve, knight and lord of Saint-Beuve, then, secondly, Georges, lord of Clères. His brother was the Admiral of France Jean de Vienne (died 1396) and his uncle was Jean de Vienne (died 1382), archbishop of Besançon.

== Biography ==
Guillaume was a monk in the Abbey of St Martin, Autun, of which he became abbot. Around 1375, he became the abbot of Saint-Seine, a position he held until 1379.

He was named bishop of Autun on 13 February 1379 by bulls of Pope Clement VII and was appointed bishop of Beauvais on 26 August 1387. He was not there long, as on 29 March 1389 he was named archbishop of Rouen, although he did not take possession of the archdiocese before November 1389 (the Gallia Christiana dates his solemn entry to 1393; he was however present at the manor of Déville as of August 1389).

He attended the first embassy with the new Pope Benedict XIII in 1394. He was also present at the convent of the Celestines of Avignon during the burial of Clement VII in September 1401. He celebrated mass in the Sainte-Chapelle at the coronation of Queen Isabeau of Bavaria, wife of King Charles VI of France. He was also present in Rouen during the translation of the relics of Saint Louis.

He died on 18 February 1407 in the hôtel of the archbishops of Rouen in Paris and was buried in the Abbey of Saint-Seine in an imposing tomb with a recumbent effigy.
