= Philip of Vienne =

French bishop and saint

Philip (Philippe, Philippus) was a semi-legendary Bishop of Vienne in France during the 6th century. He is mentioned in the catalogus of the bishops of Vienne produced by Archbishop Ado of Vienne (799–875), in his Chronicle. He is considered a local and pre-congregational saint by the Roman Catholic church.

== Historicity ==
According to the historian Ulysse Chevalier (1879), Philip was chairman at the second provincial council of Lyon, in 567, and the fourth council of Paris, in 573. The historian Louis Duchesne (1894) confirms his participation in the Council of Paris of 573, but gives the year 570 for that of Lyon.

== Veneration ==
He is thought to have died during the year 580. Today, the feast of Saint Philip is celebrated locally on May 3 but in the diocese of Grenoble-Vienne on July 1 with Saint Martin and all the bishop saints of Vienne.
