= Evantius of Vienne =

French Catholic saint

Evantius of Vienne (French: Évance) is a saint of the Roman Catholic Church and during the later 6th century a bishop of Vienne in France. Evantius is mentioned in the list of the bishops of Vienne produced by Archbishop Ado of Vienne (799-875), in his Chronicle.

The bishop participated in several councils during his episcopate, including:

- the first council of Mâcon (581 or 582)
- the third provincial council of Lyon (583)
- the third council of Valence (584 or 585),
- the second council of Mâcon (585).

== See also ==
- Roman Catholic Archdiocese of Vienne#Archbishops
