= Verus I of Vienne =

Bishop of Vienne and saint

Saint Verus of Vienne or Verus I of Vienne (French: Vère or Vérus de Vienne, also Saint Vère; Latin: Verus Viennensis episcopus; fl. 4th century), is a saint of the Catholic church (feast day: 1 August) and a 4th-century bishop of Vienne in France.

== Life ==
Verus, whose origins and earlier life are unknown, was bishop of Vienne. Duchesne's interpretation of the traditional chronology, of which there are conflicting versions, makes Verus the fourth bishop.

He is recorded as having attended the Council of Arles in 314.

Verus is venerated as a saint, with his feast day celebrated on 1 August, according to Ado's Martyrologie and the Bollandists.

== Chevalier's chronology ==
Chevalier, on the basis of a passage in Ado, added an earlier Verus to the traditional chronology, dating him to the reign of the Emperor Trajan:

[Under Trajan.] Verus, bishop of Vienne, who was of the number of the disciples who heard the apostles, shone in the time of Trajan in the teaching and confession of the faith. In these times, the bishop of the city of Sinope, Phocas, achieved his martyrdom with great glory and his most holy relics were transferred to Gaul to the city of Vienne, where they were deposited in the church of the Holy Apostles ["Saints-Apôtres"].
Adon, Chronique, VI (transl. Lucas)

Chevalier further mentions him as having received a letter from Pope Pius I (c. 140–c. 154). This letter of the pope is the first document mentioned by Chevalier in the Regeste dauphinois (1912), with a date estimated as around 140/155 or 142/156. This document however forms part of the collection of "false privileges", which are considered to be probably spurious.

== See also ==
- Verus II of Vienne
