= Burchard (archbishop of Vienne) =

Burchard (Note: His name be spelled Brochard or Bouchard in French. In Latin it is Burcardus and Brucardus are found.) (died 20 August 1031) was the archbishop of Vienne from 1001 until his death. He was also the count of the Viennois from 1023, the first bishop of Vienne to hold secular power in the county simultaneously.

Burchard belonged to the Anselmid lineage. He was the eldest son of Anselm (died after 1002), a nobleman described in documents as an "illustrious man" (vir inluster), and his wife, Aldiud, (Note: Also spelled Aaldiu or Aldeiu, perhaps a variant of Adelania.) who had been the concubine, about 964, of King Conrad of Burgundy. Anselm and Aldiud were married around 970. Burchard's younger brothers were Anselm, bishop of Aosta, and Ulric, who was married to a woman named Girelda. In addition, the woman named Ancilla (Note: Also spelled Ancilia or Auxilia.) who married Count Humbert I of Savoy was probably Burchard's sister. In early 1019, Burchard removed Humbert as advocatus of the archdiocese of Vienne and gave the position to his brother Ulric. On 19 August 1019, Burchard and his brother Ulric donated land in the Genevois to the church of Saint Peter in Vienne for the sake of their parents' souls.

Through his mother, Burchard was the half-brother of Archbishop Burchard II of Lyon, Conrad's illegitimate son. He probably owed his election to the see of Vienne to royal preferment. On 14 September 1023, King Rudolf III and Queen Ermengard granted the county of the Viennois to the archbishop of Vienne. With this acquisition, Burchard controlled the fiscal lands of the county as well as its castle. Rudolf had previously bestowed the county, along with that of Sermorens, on Ermengard in 1011, shortly after their marriage. The county of Sermorens was not ceded to the archbishop. The French historian Georges de Manteyer advanced the theory that Burchard created the counties of Maurienne and Albon out of the Viennois and enfeoffed them to the families that would be the Savoyards and Dauphins in 1023.

Burchard was regarded as a proponent of the Peace of God movement and his epitaph reads:

Agnos defensans et fortiter hostibus instans,
Prosternens nocuos belligerans cuneos.
Victricem palmam Domini perduxit in aulam,
Cum quo perpetua pace viget placida.

Defending lambs and bravely pressing enemies,
Battling and making the dangerous troops bow.
He led them in the palace to the victorious prize of God,
With which perpetual peace quietly thrives.

== Sources ==
- Poupardin, René (1907). Le Royaume de Bourgogne, 888–1038: étude sur les origines du royaume d'Arles. Paris: Champion.
- Previté-Orton, C. W. (1912). The Early History of the House of Savoy (1000–1233). Cambridge: Cambridge University Press.

Catholic Church titles
Preceded by Theobald	Archbishop of Vienne; 1001–1031	Succeeded by Leodegarius
