= Collegiate Church of Saint-Barnard =

Roman Catholic church in Romans-sur-Isère, France

Coordinates: 45°02′33″N 5°02′57″E

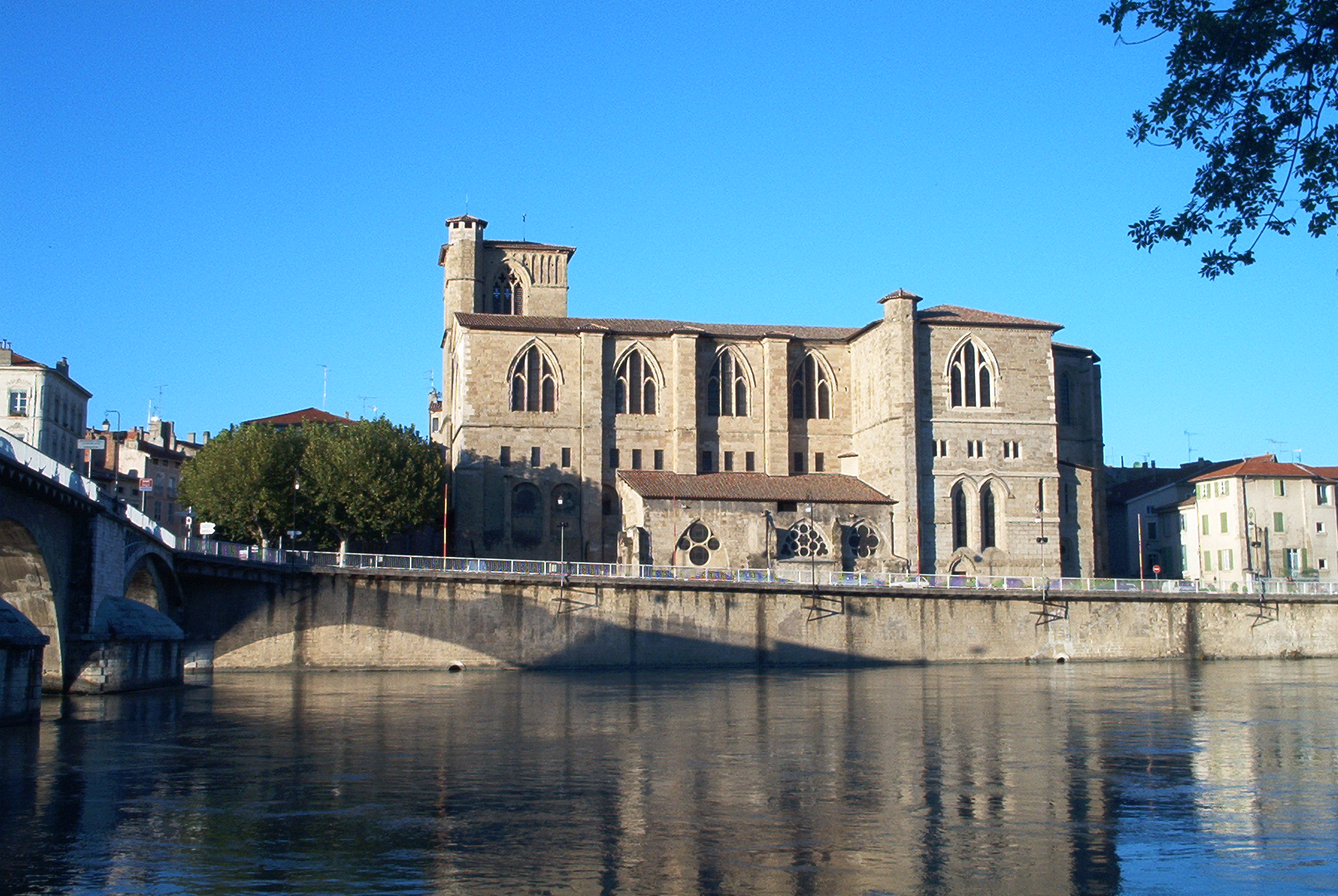
Collegiate Church of Saint-Barnard

The Collegiate Church of Saint-Barnard is a former collegiate church in Romans-sur-Isère, France, founded in 838 by Saint Bernard of Vienne on the banks of the Isère river.

The church is the subject of a classification as historical monuments by the list of 1840, supplemented by a classification in 1942 for the classification of the plots of land around it.

== History ==
Barnard, Archbishop of Vienne, built a Benedictine abbey in 838 on the right bank of the Isère, near a very busy ford. He dedicated his monastery to Saint Peter and Saint Paul. Barnard died in 842. He was canonized in 944, and because of this the name of Saint-Barnard gradually took hold.

In 860, the abbey was devastated by the Normans during their raid in the Rhone Valley. It was rebuilt from 908 by Abbé David who was installed by the Archbishop of Vienne Alexandre. The reconstruction was continued by Abbot Fortunius and was still not finished in 917.

Hostilities appeared between the Archbishop of Vienne Sobon and the monks of the abbey. The archbishop sent troops to Romans under the direction of Silvion de Clérieu. These troops looted and set fire to the monastery around 932, which earned Silvion de Clérieu the nickname of Silvion the Arsonist. In 932, Silvion went to Rome and did penance as written in a brief by Pope John XI. He rebuilt the abbey and freed 60 serfs. Silvion probably seized part of the abbey's domain and never rebuilt the abbey. Between 932 and 939, probably on the initiative of the Archbishop of Vienne, the monks were replaced by a chapter of regular canons headed by Abbot Rainulphe. We had to proceed, from 944, to the elevation of the relics of Saint Barnard which were placed in a silver shrine to the left of the main altar dedicated to the holy apostles. Many miracles occurring in front of his tomb, the collegiate church has become a place of pilgrimage.

In 1025, the great-great-grandson of Silvion the Arsonist, Léger, became abbot of Saint-Barnard, and in 1031 archbishop of Vienne. The charter of November 23, 1025 concerning his election and found in the cartulary of Saint-Barnard, indicates that Léger is the son of Guillaume and Fides. This charter also shows that the abbey is a stronghold of the Clérieu family, which owns all the income and all the rights attached to it. On the occasion of this election, Guillaume de Clérieu, Léger's father, gave up his rights to the town of Romans in favor of his son. From this date, the Archbishop of Vienne was by right also Abbot of Saint-Barnard. The archbishop and abbot Léger (1025-1070) built a bridge over the Isère, now called "Pont Vieux", allowing the development of the city. Two fires ravaged Romans during his abbacy. It is likely that he also had to rebuild the abbey. In 1049, he authorized the chapter to build a cloister against the southern flank of the abbey and houses to the west of the church for the staff not living together in the enclosure.

One of his successors, Étienne, suffered the burning of the monastery and the town by Guigues, Dauphin, Count of Albon, in 1134.

The Romanesque remains visible today date from the immediately subsequent reconstruction. However, part of the walls burnt down in 1134 were preserved in the nave and probably embedded behind a new facing that we see today.

In the 13th century (from around 1238), Archbishop Jean de Bernin had the Gothic parts of the transept and choir built, in a beautiful para-Chartrain style also known as “Burgundy Gothic”. At the end of the 13th century, a chapel was built to the south of the choir, in the 14th century the chapel of Saint Etienne, then others still in the 15th century.

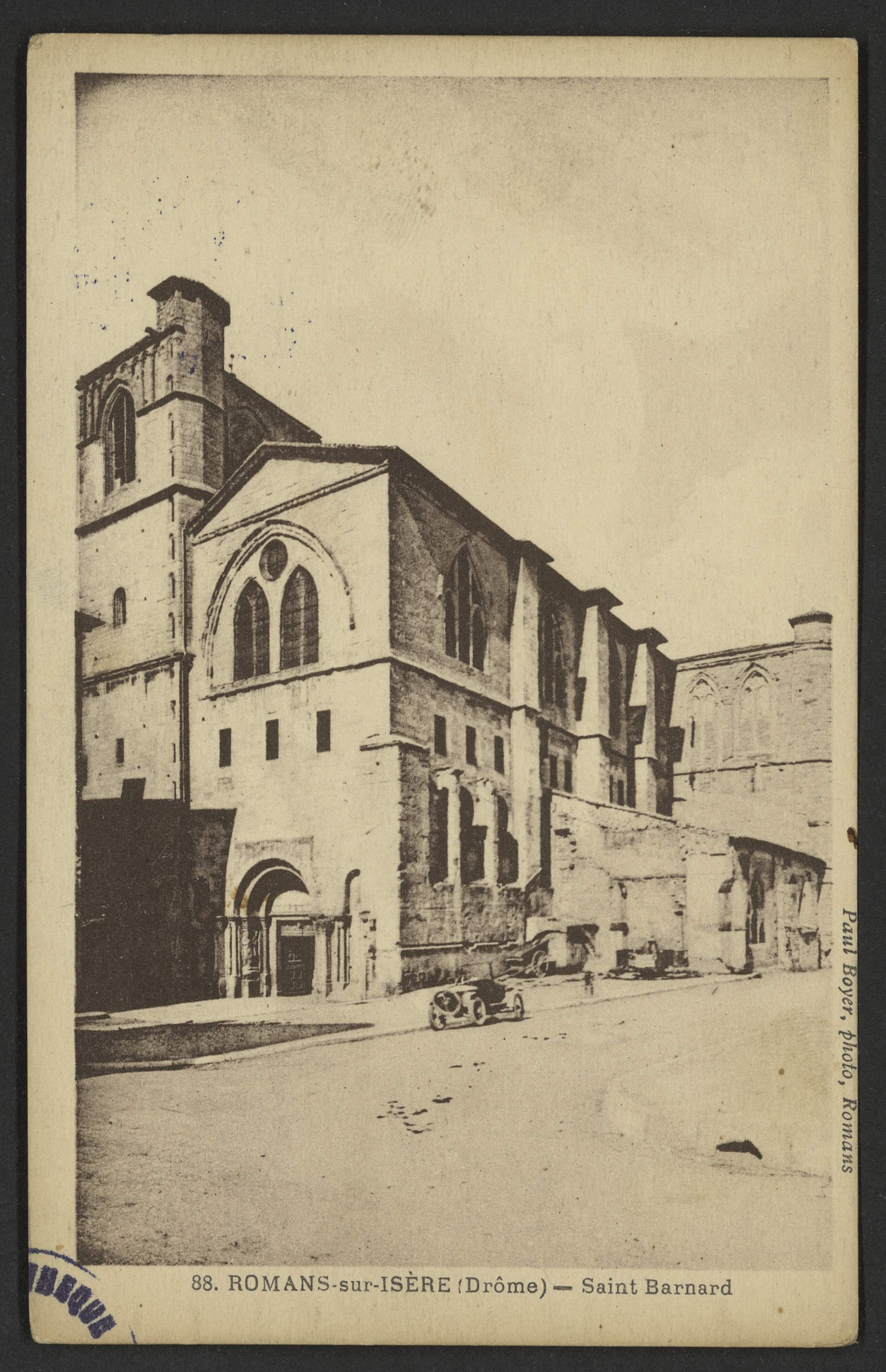
Romans-sur-Isère (Drôme) - Saint Barnard

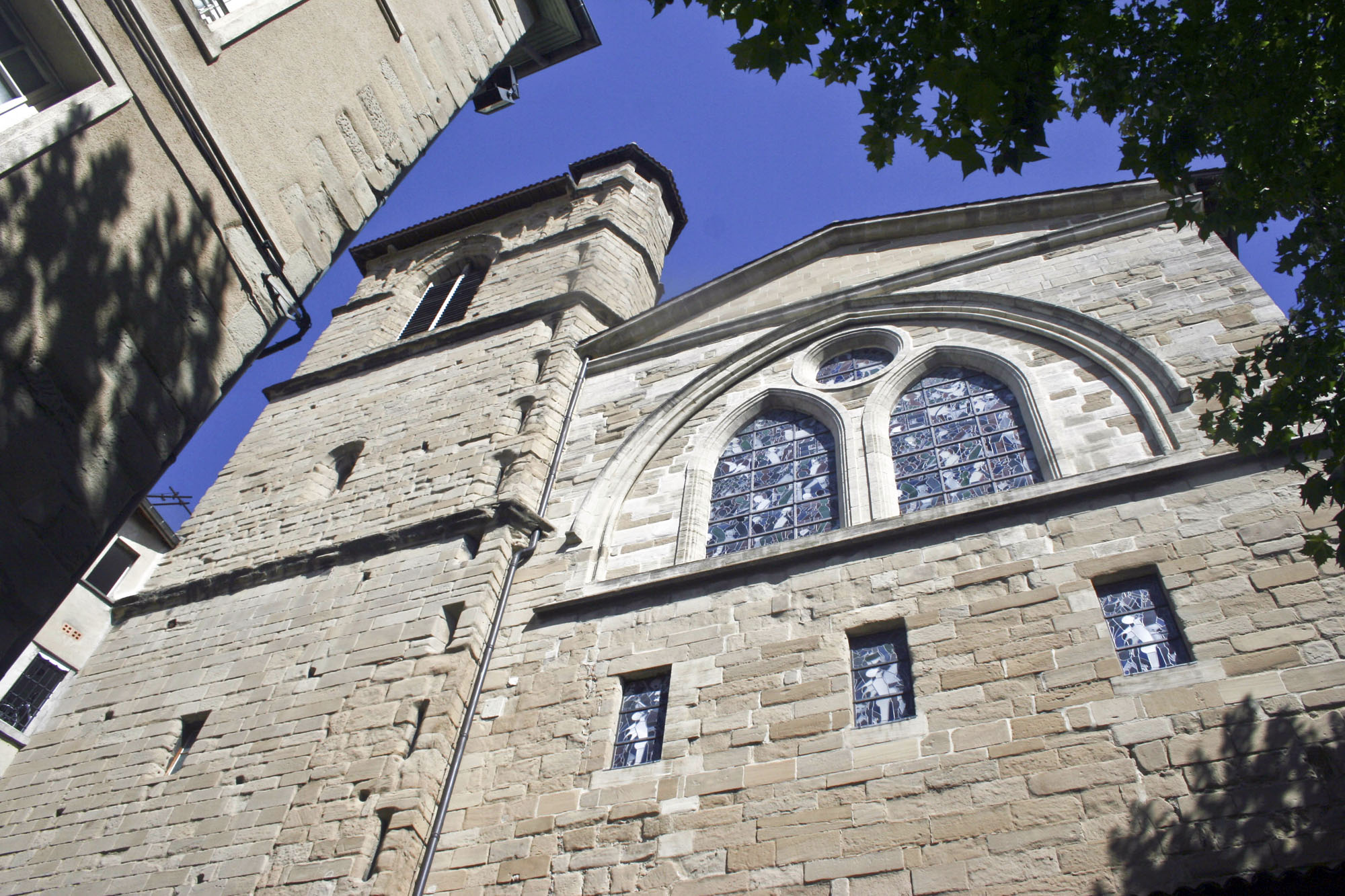
The façade of the clocher

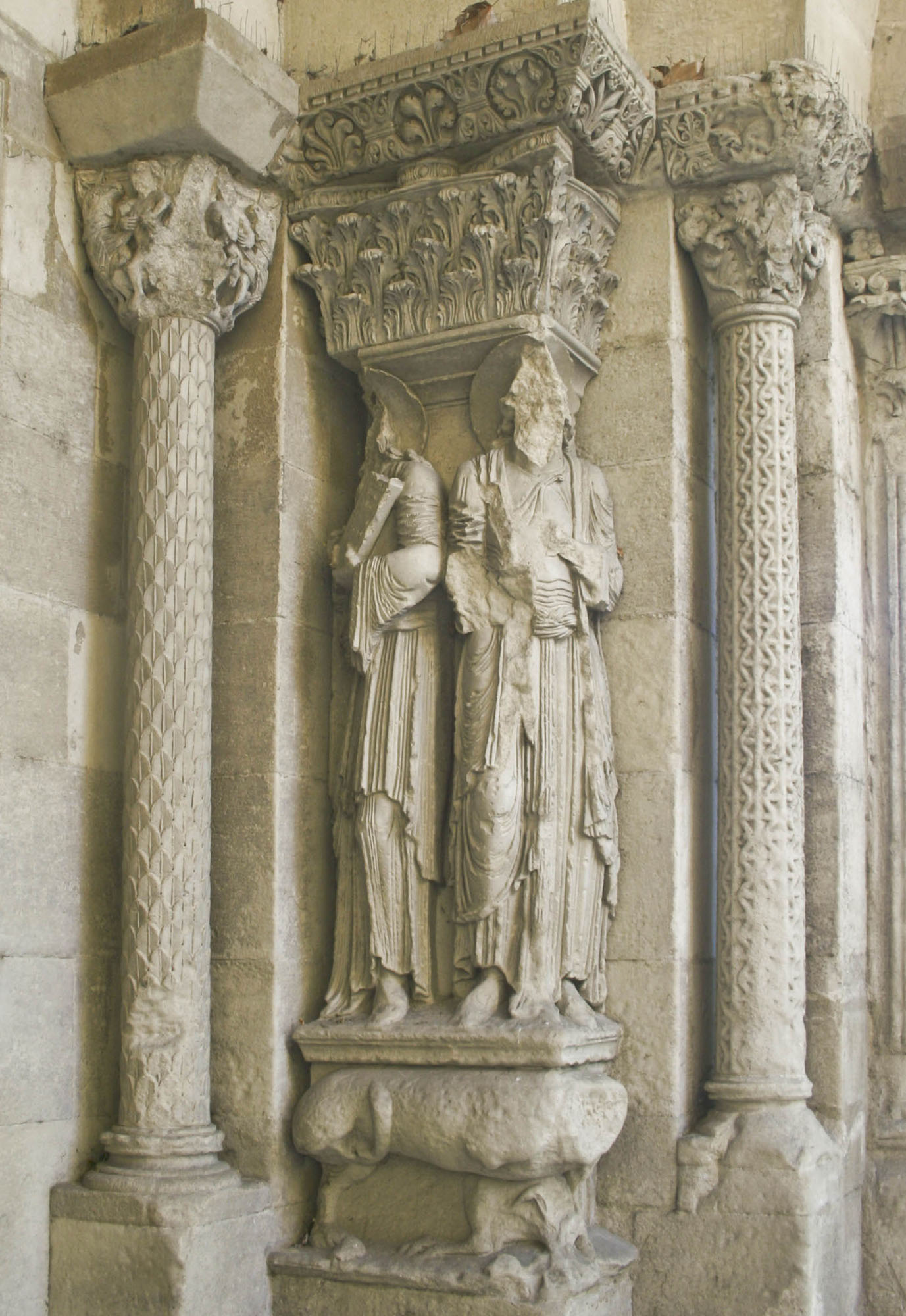
Sculptures of St Barnard

The church was damaged during the wars of religion, in 1562 (ransacking by the Baron des Adrets) and in 1567 by the bands of Cardé and Geyssans who completed the ruin by bringing down the vaults and steeples. François de Belleforest came to Romans in 1572 and reported that the collegiate church of Saint-Barnard was ruined like the other churches in Romans. If the monks estimate the cost of the damage to the Saint-Barnard church alone at 200,000 pounds, the prices and the remains of the Gothic paintings show that the vaults of the transept resisted. A first series of works to put the church out of water were carried out between 1574 and 1583. The poor financial means of the chapter meant that its reconstruction was slow and only began in 1652 on the initiative of a large builder: Charles de Lionne, sacristan of the collegiate church and main character of the chapter after the abbot. Work was carried out gradually from the choir to the nave and was completed in 1720 with the elegant gallery which waited until 1843 for the installation of the organs.

The French Revolution again damaged the church as well as the 11th century Romanesque cloister which had probably already been rebuilt in the 12th century. Parts of the cloister, chapels and the old bell tower were sold to individuals.

Church listed in 1840 by Mérimée; he could not prevent the municipal officials from having the cloister destroyed to build the Quai de l'Isère. He only managed to temporarily save the north gallery.
