= Frankish synods of 829 =

Louis's order convoking the synods, a copy from the manuscript Barcelona, Arxiu de la Corona d'Aragó, Ripoll 40

The Frankish church held four synods simultaneously throughout the Frankish Empire on the octave of Pentecost in 829. These were held in Lyon, Mainz, Paris and Toulouse. They were followed by an imperial diet in Worms in August.

According to Gerhard Schmitz, the synods of 829 mark a break in the history of Frankish legislation. Until then, Louis the Pious's government was characterised by continuity with his father's. Carine van Rhijn, however, emphasises the similarity of the 829 synods to the reform councils of 813.

== Convocation ==
The emperors Louis the Pious and Lothar I convoked the synods in December 828. The text of their convocation, known as the Constitutio de synodis, survives. Four archbishops were summoned to Mainz: Otgar of Mainz, Hadbold of Cologne, Hetto of Trier and Bernoin of Besançon; four to Paris: Ebbo of Reims, Ragenfred of Rouen, Lantramn of Tours and the Sens; five to Lyon: Agobard of Lyon, Bernard of Vienne, Andrew of Tarentaise, Benedict of Aix and Agaricus of Embrun; and four to Toulouse: Notho of Arles, Bartholomew of Narbonne, Adelelm of Bordeaux and Agilulf of Bourges.

The agenda of the synods was to identify what in the empire fell short of God's standards and to correct it. The morals of the clergy and the abuse of authority by officials were especially in focus. The synods were a response to major military failures in 827. Duke Baldric of Friuli had been removed from office for his failure to stop a Bulgarian invasion by Omurtag and Counts Matfrid of Orléans and Hugh of Tours were likewise dismissed after failing to meet the invasion of Abu Marwan.

== Proceedings ==
Of the canons generated by the synods, only those from the meeting in Paris have survived. Events at Mainz are known through a collection of letters from Fulda Abbey, themselves preserved in the 16th-century Magdeburg Centuries. The synod was well attended by bishops from east of the Rhine. The bishops heard the case of the monk Gottschalk of Fulda against his abbot, Hrabanus Maurus, alleging that he had been unlawfully oblated to the monastery. The bishops agreed with the complainant and released Gottschalk from his vows. Nothing is known of what took place in Lyon or Toulouse.

== Diet of Worms ==
The bishops presented a joint report to the emperors at an assembly in Worms in August. This Relatio episcoporum was written by Bishop Jonas of Orléans and thus relies heavily on the canons of the Paris synod. The Relatio is addressed to Louis the Pious alone. The Relatio takes up about 25 pages in modern printed editions, but the canons of Paris were over twice as long. It is divided into chapters (capitulae) and includes one petitio (request) addressed to Louis. The political theology of the Relatio is based on the letter Famuli vestrae pietatis of Pope Gelasius I. It states that the "whole holy church of God is made up of two personae: the sacerdotal [priestly] and the regal, of which the sacerdotal is the weightier". The bishops thus asserted their authority to judge the king in spiritual matters. They also criticized themselves for avaritia (love of money), the root of all kinds of evil.

== Bibliography ==
- Chénon, Émile (1916). "De l'apparition du mot archiepiscopus dans les textes francs". Bulletin de la Société nationale des antiquaires de France: 150–159.
- De Jong, Mayke (1995). In Samuel's Image: Child Oblation in the Early Medieval West. Brill.
- De Jong, Mayke (2009). The Penitential State: Authority and Atonement in the Age of Louis the Pious, 814–840. Cambridge University Press.
- Gillis, Matthew Bryan (2017). Heresy and Dissent in the Carolingian Empire: The Case of Gottschalk of Orbais. Oxford University Press.
- Schmitz, Gerhard (1990). "The Capitulary Legislation of Louis the Pious". In Peter Godman; Roger Collins (eds.). Charlemagne's heir: New Perspectives on the Reign of Louis the Pious. Clarendon Press. pp. 425–436.
- Van Rhijn, Carine (2003). Shepherds of the Lord: Priests and Episcopal Statutes in the Carolingian Period (PhD diss.). University of Utrecht.
