= Austrebert of Vienne =

Archbishop of Vienne, France

Austrebert or Austrebertus was bishop of Vienne in the Dauphiné, France, during the first half of the 8th century. He was in post by 719, as Pope Gregory II sent him a letter dated 31 August of that year, and was still in post on 7 March 742, when he received a letter from Pope Zachary. Austrebert was forced to flee Vienne shortly after this date by the raids of the Saracens and died "very far from Vienne".

He was preceded in the bishopric by Saint Bobolinus and succeeded by Saint Wilcharius.

He is locally venerated as a saint. His feast day is celebrated on 5 June.
