= Zacharias of Vienne =

French Catholic bishop and martyr

Saint Zacharias or Zachary

Martyr and Bishop of Vienne
- Died: 106
- Venerated in: Roman Catholic Church; Eastern Orthodox Church
- Feast: 26 May

Zacharias of Vienne, also sometimes Zachary or Zachariah, was traditionally the second Bishop of Vienne (Latin: Vienna) in what is now Isère, France, until he was supposedly martyred in 106 AD during the reign of the Emperor Trajan. He was one of the first Christian evangelists in France. He is venerated locally and is one of the patron saints of the city of Vienne. His feast day is celebrated on 26 May.

== Historicity ==
There is a scarcity of historical evidence regarding the early bishops of the Roman Catholic Archdiocese of Vienne. For example, Saint Verus has been documented as the bishop of Vienne in the year 314, but it remains unclear whether he may have had the same name as an earlier Verus who is listed as the fourth bishop in the line of succession of bishops of Vienne.

== Life ==
The tradition is that Zacharias lived in Vienne at the end of the first century, where the people elected him to be their second bishop. Since Christianity was forbidden in the Roman Empire, he was martyred there in 106 by the Prefect Pompey on the orders of the Emperor Trajan.

== Veneration ==
Having a local veneration, Zacharias is one of the patron saints of the city of Vienne. His cult was confirmed by the Roman Catholic Church and his feast day is celebrated on 26 May.

== Sources ==
- Zeno.org: Zacharias (in German)
- Johannes Hofmann: Zacharias von Vienne. In: Biographisch-Bibliographisches Kirchenlexikon (BBKL), Band 14, col. 307. Bautz, Herzberg 1998 ISBN 3-88309-073-5
