= Saint-Martin-l'Ars =

- Commune
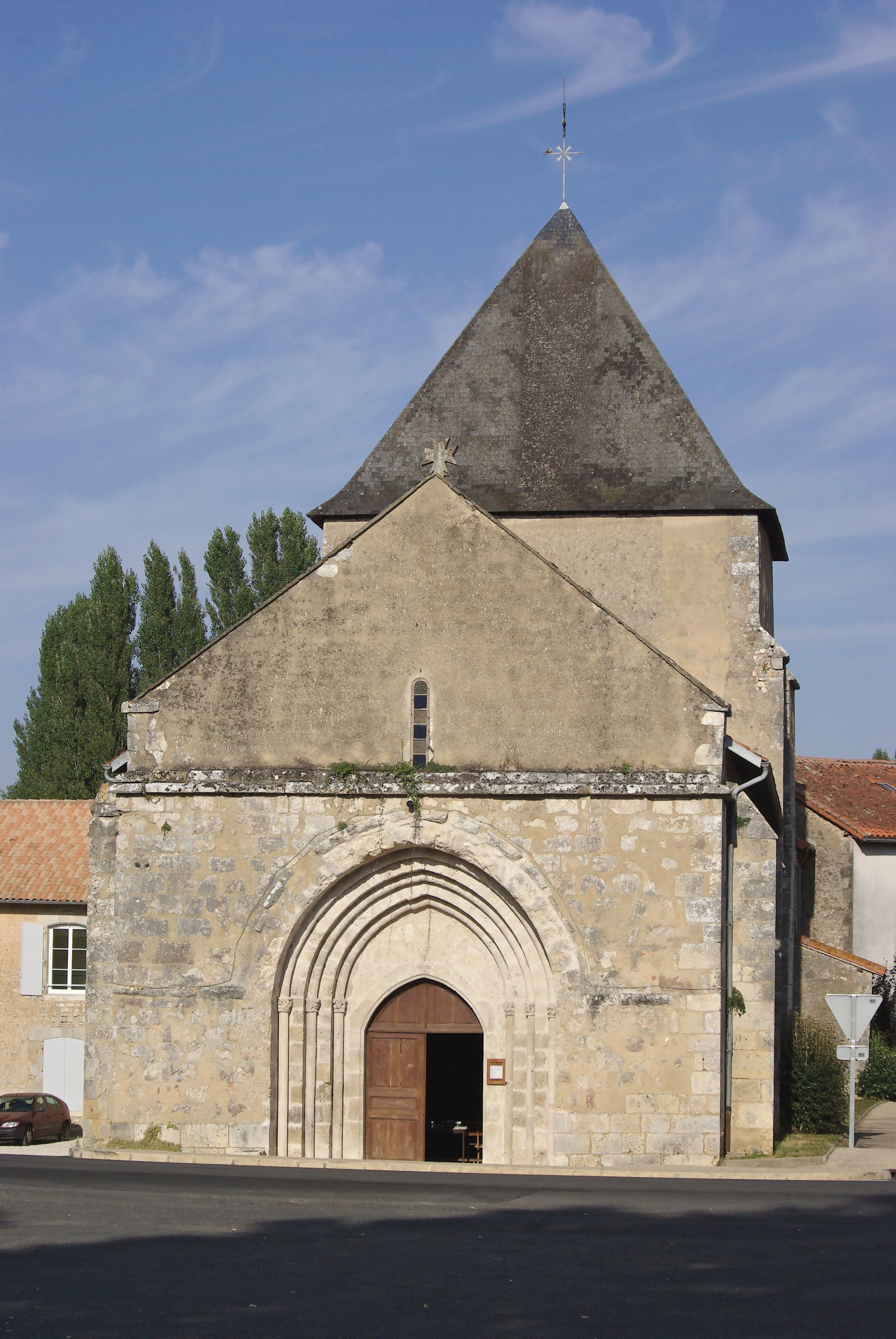
- The church of Saint-Martin
- Location of Saint-Martin-l'Ars
- Location within France Location within Nouvelle-Aquitaine
- Coordinates: 46°13′13″N 0°31′53″E
- Country: France
- Region: Nouvelle-Aquitaine
- Department: Vienne
- Arrondissement: Montmorillon
- Canton: Civray

Government
  - Mayor (2020–2026): Xavier Diot
- Area^{1}: 41.76 km^{2} (16.12 sq mi)
- Elevation: 146 m (479 ft)
- Highest elevation: 169 m (554 ft)
- Lowest elevation: 132 m (433 ft)
- Population (2023): 362
  - Density: 8.67/km^{2} (22.5/sq mi)
- Time zone: UTC+01:00 (CET)
  - Summer (DST): UTC+02:00 (CEST)
- INSEE/Postal code: 86234 /86350
- ^{1} French Land Register data, which excludes lakes, ponds, glaciers > 1 km^{2} (0.386 sq mi or 247 acres) and river estuaries.

Saint-Martin-l'Ars (French pronunciation: [sɛ̃ maʁtɛ̃ laʁ]) is a commune in the Vienne department and Nouvelle-Aquitaine region of western France.

== Geography ==
The Clouère flows north-northwest through the middle of the commune. The Clain flows northwest through the south-western part of the commune and crosses the village.

=== Geology and terrain ===
The commune is part of the region known as the Civraisien, which is a popular tourist destination due to its scenery and historic sites.

=== Hydrography ===
202 ponds have been identified across the municipality (out of 30,000 recorded in the Poitou-Charentes region). They were created by humans, especially to meet the water needs of people (community ponds), livestock or after extraction (clay, marl, millstones). Rich in botanical life they play a major role for amphibians (newts, frogs), reptiles (snakes) and dragonflies. They are a symbolic element of the rural heritage and contribute greatly to the maintenance of biodiversity in both the plains and the woodlands.

=== Climate ===
The climate is oceanic with mild summers.

== Toponymy ==
The village's name comes from Saint Martin of Vienne, bishop of Vienne in the 2nd century, the evangelist of Poitou. The suffix "ars" means "burnt".

== Demographics ==
Historical population
Year	Pop.	±% p.a.
1968	748	—
1975	599	−3.12%
1982	515	−2.14%
1990	417	−2.60%
1999	389	−0.77%
2007	409	+0.63%
2012	384	−1.25%
2017	386	+0.10%
2023	362	−1.06%
Source: INSEE

== History ==
During World War II, the battle line crossed the commune, from 22 June 1940 to 1 March 1943, leaving the settlement in the free zone and a small part of the territory of the municipality in the occupied zone. On 14 July 1941, the population showed their strength of will by celebrating the National Day, which was banned in 1940, around a bonfire and singing the Marseillaise.

In 1945, to celebrate the liberation and return of the Republic, a lime tree was planted as a "tree of liberty".

== Abbey of Notre-Dame de la Réau ==
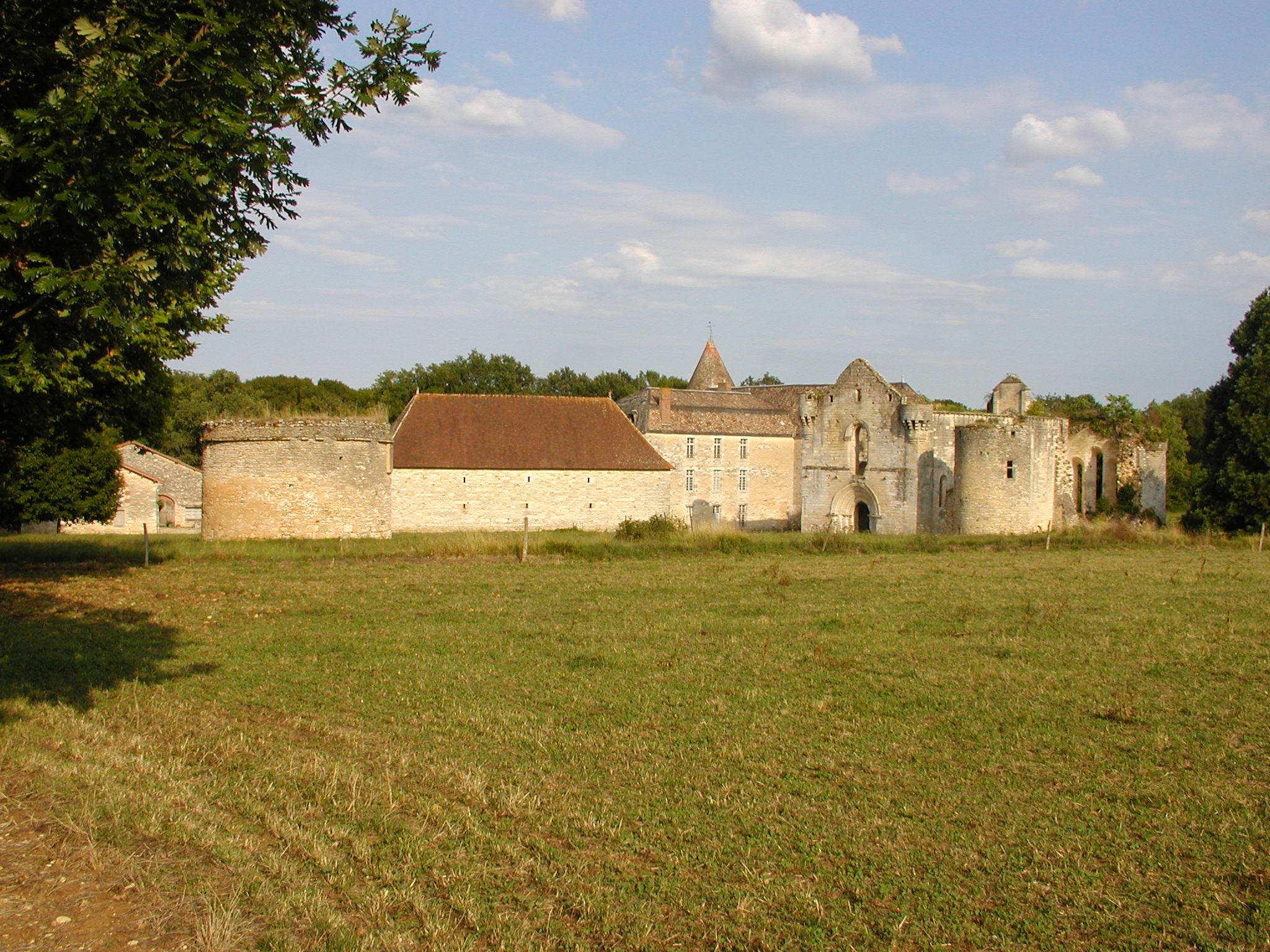
Abbey of Notre-Dame de la Réau

The Abbey of Notre-Dame de la Réau, located on the left bank of the Clain in a secluded corner on the borders of Poitou and the Lower Marche, was founded in the 12th century by canons following the rule of St. Augustine.

It was a very important house, the influence of which, as a result of its many subsidiaries, extended far beyond the region as far as Anjou and Brittany. It was dissolved during the French Revolution.

Having reviewed the history and archaeological survey in 1937, François Eygun wrote in the Poitevin Press in 1970 that this was "one of the most prestigious monuments of the Haut-Poitou".

== See also ==
- Communes of the Vienne department
