= Eoaldus of Vienne =

Archbishop of Vienne, France

Saint Eoaldus or Eoldus (French: Éoalde; died around 716) was bishop of Vienne in the very late 7th century and the early 8th century, and is considered a pre-congregational saint in the Catholic church.

Eoaldus is mentioned in the will of the abbot Ephibius in 696, which left lands to the church in Vienne, and in a confirmation of Childebert III in 697.

He was a relation of the Frankish royal family. He was responsible for beginning the construction of a new cathedral in Vienne (replaced in the 11th century) and for its dedication to Saint Maurice and the Theban Legion.

His feast day is celebrated on 7 July.
