= Warmund (archbishop of Vienne) =

Archbishop of Vienne from 1076 until his death in 1083

Warmund was the archbishop of Vienne from 1076 until his death in 1083. As a monk of the abbey of Romans, he was elected to succeed Abbot Léger before the latter's death in 1070. He was later elected to succeed Léger as archbishop. He held the abbacy and archbishopric concurrently until his death. He is accused of dissipating the diocese's property. Upon his death, Bishop Gontard of Valence administered the diocese as vicar. His successor, Guy of Burgundy, was only elected in 1088.
