= Greek East and Latin West =

Division of the Greco-Roman world and medieval Christendom

The terms "Greek East" and "Latin West" originally distinguished the Greco-Roman world between the Greek-dominated Eastern Mediterranean and the Latin-dominated Western Mediterranean. These diverging identities effectively bisected the Roman Empire into cultural and linguistic halves—the Eastern Empire (or Byzantine) and the Western Empire—and later defined the dynamic of medieval Christianity in relation to the East–West Schism, which, after 1054 AD, affected Christendom throughout much of Europe, North Africa, and West Asia.

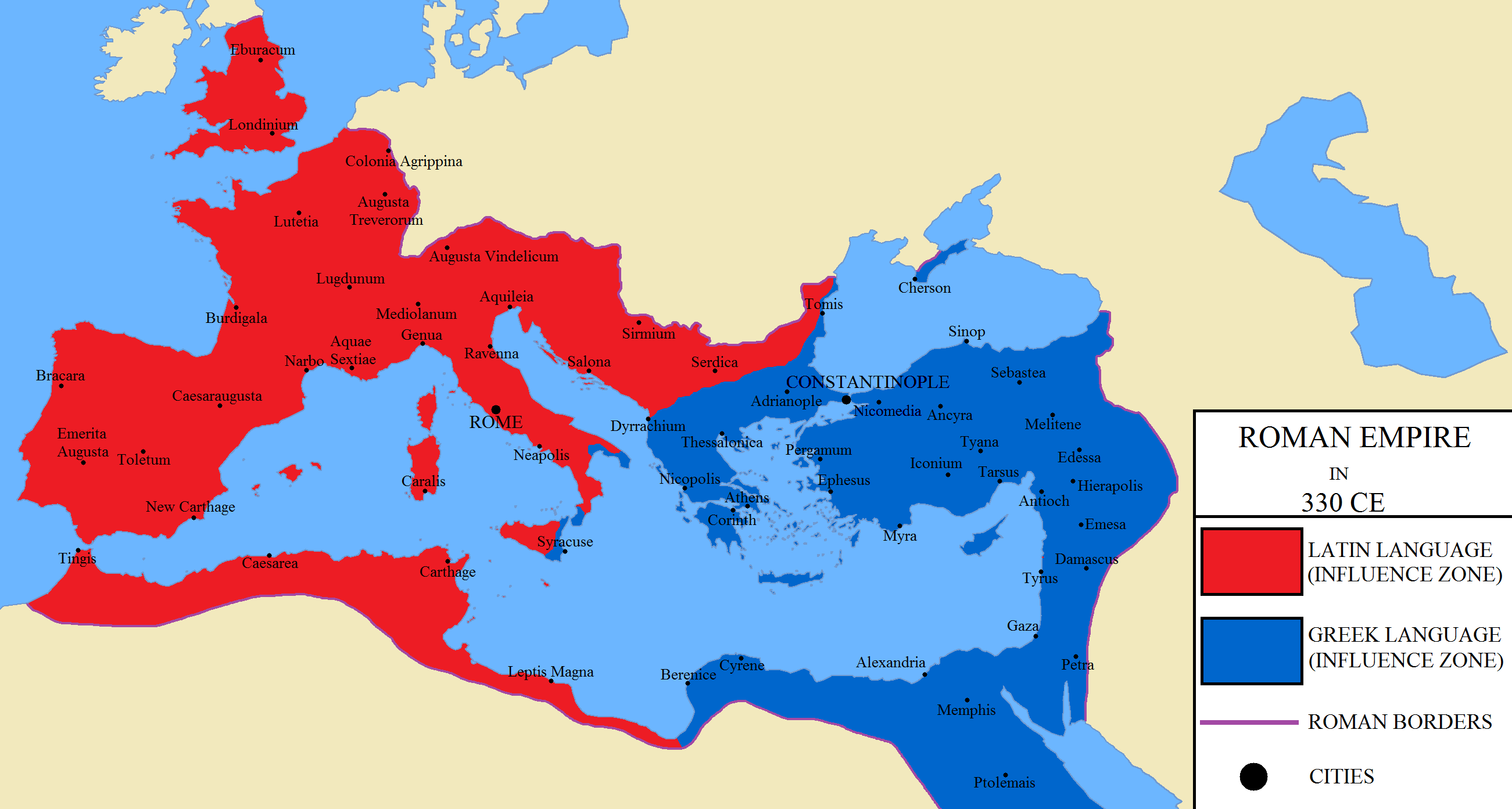
Map of the Roman Empire in AD 330, with Latin-dominated regions (the Western Mediterranean and adjacent territory) shown in red and Greek-dominated regions (the Eastern Mediterranean) shown in blue.

As a result of centuries-long Hellenization, especially during the Hellenistic period, the Greek language was widespread across the Eastern Mediterranean as a lingua franca; whereas Latin had enjoyed official status and privilege since the beginnings of the Roman state, although the effect of Romanization was considerably less prominent in the region. Latin's usage ultimately declined vis-à-vis Greek, with which it had co-existed and gradually equalized. Having been accelerated by a variety of administrative changes between the 3rd and 7th centuries, the Greek–Latin divide was cemented due to the Western Empire's collapse in AD 476, as well as due to the Eastern Empire's failed attempts to restore unity. By the Early Middle Ages, the Christian world would experience a total break in communion between Rome and Constantinople, on the basis of this divide, before witnessing the Eastern Empire's collapse in AD 1453.

== Ancient period: Greco-Roman world ==
In the classical context, "Greek East" refers to the provinces and client states of the Roman Empire in which the lingua franca was primarily Greek. This region included the whole Greek peninsula with some other northern parts in the Balkans, the provinces around the Black Sea, those of the Bosphorus, all of Asia Minor (in the loosest possible sense, to include Cappadocia and extending to Armenia Minor), Magna Graecia (southern part of the Italian peninsula and Sicily), and the other West Asian and North African provinces along the eastern rim of the Mediterranean Sea (Syria, Palaestina, Egypt, and Cyrenaica). These Roman provinces had been Greek colonies or Greek-ruled states during the Hellenistic period, i.e. until the Roman conquests.

At the start of late antiquity, beginning with the reorganization of the empire's provincial divisions during the reign of Diocletian (ruled 284–305), the concept of the Greek East developed to stand in contradistinction to the Latin West. Thereafter, Greek East refers to the Greek-speaking above-mentioned provinces (after 395 AD, mostly in the Greek-speaking Eastern Roman Empire) in contradistinction to the provinces in Western Europe, Italia (excluding the Catepanate of Italy, where they still spoke Greek) and the coastal Maghreb of Mediterranean North Africa (after 395 in the Latin-speaking Western Roman Empire).

=== Latin and Greek among Roman emperors ===
Roman emperors who spoke Latin tended to learn Greek but not vice versa. For example, Marcus Aurelius mastered Greek to such an extent that he wrote the Meditations (circa 170) in Greek. Similarly, Julian would write in Greek.

== Medieval period: Christian world ==
"Greek East" and "Latin West" are terms used also to divide Chalcedonian Christianity into the Greek-speaking Eastern Orthodox peoples of the Eastern Mediterranean Basin, centered on the Byzantine Empire, and the Latin-speaking Roman Catholic peoples of Western Europe and the Maghreb. Here, Latin West applies to regions that were formerly part of the Western Roman Empire, specifically Italia, Gallia (Gaul), Hispania, Mauretania, Dalmatia, and Britannia. It also later-applied to areas that had never been part of the Empire but which later came under the culture sphere of the Latin West, such as Magna Germania, Hibernia (Ireland), and Caledonia (Scotland). In this sense, the term "Latin" came to refer to the liturgical and scholarly language of the Western Roman Empire, as many of these regions did not, in fact, speak Latin.

Modern scholars agree that by the 12th century, theological debate (or disputatio) between Christians of the Greek East and Latin West was focused on three Christian doctrines: 'the so-called filioque controversy regarding the procession of the Holy Spirit, leavened or unleavened bread in the Eucharist, and the primacy of the pope.' However, it is not known when or how this began.

British philosopher Philip Sherrard (1959) claimed that the cause of Christendom's split into a Greek East and a Latin West was differing conceptions of sacerdotium and regnum, leading the Orthodox Patriarchate in Constantinople to never lay claim to secular power; rather, to submit to the Byzantine emperor and later the Ottoman sultan (supposedly the reason for the 'Eastern submission to autocracy'), while the Catholic Papacy persistently laid claim to have authority over the secular princes of the West (allegedly 'the roots of modern democracy'). E. Evans (1960) panned Sherrard's book, writing: '...it must be said that unless the obscurity of the writer's language has dulled the reader's intelligence, neither the Filioque clause nor the developments of modern international politics are really shown to depend on the western as opposed to the eastern, the Latin as opposed to the Greek, doctrine of God and of creation: the argument, if there is one, is per saltum, and need amount to no more than an a posteriori interpretation of historical facts in the light of preconceived ideas.'

According to English theologian Andrew Louth (2007), the Byzantine/Roman Empire and the early Church constituted a multilingual and 'multi-cultural civilization' until the 7th century. Following a period of transition, which he dated from 681 (Third Council of Constantinople) until 1071 (Battle of Manzikert), Christendom had split into a "Greek East" and "Latin West", which he considered 'two Christian civilizations' (in reference to Huntington's Clash of Civilizations thesis). Louth primarily attributed this purported 'transition from multi-cultural Byzantium to Greek East and Latin West [to] the rise of Islam and the destruction of the stability of the Mediterranean world in the seventh century.' Nevertheless, the transition was a slow and complicated process with many factors rather than a single historic event, which 'set the two halves of Christianity on their gradually diverging tracks', as Byzantine literature professor Alexander Alexakis (2010) summarised Louth's analysis. These included observations that the Byzantine Church-State dualism remained intact after the Western Roman Empire's collapse, while bishops and eventually the Pope in the West sometimes wielded secular power. The Carolingian monarchs' renovatio also promoted theological thought at a time when the pope was embroiled in worldly affairs (8th–9th century), that the Byzantine Iconoclasm controversy caused 'the first rift between Rome and Constantinople', and that the simultaneous missionary efforts to convert the Slavs led to a 'second point of contention between Rome and Constantinople,' especially in Bulgaria (9th–10th century). Louth agreed with 'the prevailing (and more plausible) theory that assigns no particular importance to the events of 1054' (the East–West Schism) 'as far as the people of that era were concerned', and that the schism only became significant during the preliminaries to the 1245 and 1274 Councils of Lyon.

The term "Greek" varies in its application. In the most narrow sense, (after the rise of the Roman Empire) it is uniquely applied to the Eastern Roman (Byzantine) Empire. Depending on the author it may also be applied to:

- Areas within which the Greek language was the common scholarly and religious language during classical Roman times and the early Middle Ages (including Syria, Egypt, and Palestine)
- Areas that have historically been in communion with the (formerly Byzantine) Eastern Orthodox Church (including Russia and much of Eastern Europe and largely-excluding Eastern Christian communities using such languages such Syriac, Coptic, Geʽez, and Armenian which opposed the influence of Constantinople having formed what are now called the Church of the East and Oriental Orthodox Churches. Modern Romanians speak a Romance language, and they follow the (formerly Byzantine) Eastern Church.
- Areas that were heavily culturally influenced by the Eastern Roman/Byzantine Empire, directly or indirectly, during the Middle Ages, including Eastern Europe, North Africa, and West Asia (Islamic Empires).
  - Note: among Muslim historians, "Greek" and "Roman" are often categories specifically associated with Christians. Although the Sultanate of Rome and, later, the Ottoman Empire would adopt Roman titles and describe themselves as Rome's leaders, this was considered a geographic designation (much in the same way that the Ghaznavids or Delhi Sultans would be known as rulers of "Hindustan.")

Because the Latin language survived as a scholarly and liturgical language ( despite the fragmentation and religious changes in Western Europe and Northwestern Africa, the term "Latin" has survived much longer as a unifying term in the West. Conversely, use of the Greek language diminished in Western Asia and the Orthodox Slavic territories never fully embraced the language (despite their long religious affiliation with the Eastern Romans/Byzantines).

== See also ==
- Ancient Greece
- Ancient Rome
- Greco-Roman world
  - Jireček Line
  - Tetrarchy
- Legacy of the Roman Empire
  - Roman identity
  - Christianization of the Roman Empire
    - Western Christianity
    - Eastern Christianity
  - "Last Roman Emperor"
- Succession of the Roman Empire
  - New Rome
  - Problem of two emperors
- Succession of the Byzantine Empire
  - "Third Rome"

== Bibliography ==
- Brubaker, Jeff (2018). ""You are the Heretics!" Dialogue and Disputation between the Greek East and the Latin West after 1204". Medieval Encounters. 24 (5–6): 613–630. doi:10.1163/15700674-12340033. S2CID 166795372.
- Louth, Andrew (2007). Greek East and Latin West: The Church AD 691–1071. Crestwood, New York: St Vladimir's Seminary Press. p. 382. ISBN 9780881413205.
