= Council of Valence =

The Council of Valence may refer to several events held at Valence.

- The First Council of Valence held in 374; attended by Florentius of Vienne.
- The Second Council of Valence held in 528.
- The Third Council of Valence held in 855; attended by Evantius of Vienne.
- The Fourth Council of Valence held in 855; attended by Rotland of Arles.
- The Fifth Council of Valence held in 890.
- The Sixth Council of Valence held in 1100, which reinstated Hugh of Flavigny.
- The Seventh Council of Valence held in 1209.
- The Council of Valence held in 1248.

== See also ==
- List of Frankish synods
