= Domninus of Vienne =

French bishop and saint

Saint Domninus of Vienne (French: Domnin, Domnus, Donnin; d. 536) was a bishop of Vienne in France, venerated as a saint.

== Life ==
Domninus was born in the Dauphiné. He succeeded Julian as bishop in 533. He was known not only for his learning but also for his holiness, and was particularly distinguished for his efforts to release prisoners. He was succeeded after his short episcopate by Saint Pantagathus.

== Veneration ==
A church was built over his grave. His feast day is 2 November.

== Sources ==
- Nominis: Saint Domnus de Vienne (in French)
- Katolsk.no: Domninus av Vienne (in Norwegian)
