= Theobald of Vienne =

Christian archbishop and saint

Saint Theobald of Vienne

Archbishop of Vienne, Venerable
- Born: c. 927
- Residence: Vienne, Provence
- Died: c. 1001; Vienne, Provence
- Honored in: Roman Catholic Church, Eastern Orthodox Church
- Canonized: 9 December 1903 by Pope Pius X
- Major shrine: Vienne Cathedral
- Feast: 21 May
- Attributes: Mitre, Staff, Book, Church Model
- Patronage: Vienne, France

Saint Theobald of Vienne (c. 927 – c. 1001, also known as Teobaldo, Thibaud or Thibault) was Archbishop of Vienne from 970 until his death.

== Life ==
Theobald was born around 927 in eastern France. He was ordained a priest and was made archbishop of Vienne in 957.

A supporter of monastic revival, he was deemed a protector of the Church in lieu of royal interference. He was the uncle of Theobald of Provins. Saint Theobald of Vienne's grave is in Saint Maurice Cathedral in Vienne and is said to be the site of miracles, and was once a pilgrimage site.

He is venerated as a saint in the Eastern Orthodox Church and Roman Catholic church, with a feast day on 21 May. The cult of veneration for Theobald was approved by Pope Pius X on 9 December 1903.
