= Paschasius =

Paschasius is a masculine given name. It may refer to:

- Paschasius, villain in the legend of Saint Lucy (late 3rd century)
- Paschasius of Vienne (fl. 4th century), bishop of Vienne
- Paschasius (d. 437), advisor of the Vandal king and martyr alongside Arcadius and companions
- Paschasius of Rome (d. 512), Roman deacon and writer
- Paschasius (fl. 533), Roman praefectus annonae
- Paschasius of Dumium (fl. c. 555), Galician monk and translator
- Paschasius Radbertus (d. 865), Frankish monk and scholar
- Paschasius (bishop of Nyitra) (fl. 1280–1297), Hungarian prelate
