= Raginfred of Vienne =

Archbishop of Vienne

Raginfred (French: Rainfroi; died 30 April 906 or 907) was an archbishop of Vienne in France at the turn of the 9th-10th centuries.

== Life ==
There are no sources that throw any light on the origins of Raginfred but as Charvet (1761) suggested, he must have belonged to an illustrious family to be able to gain the archiepiscopal see of Vienne.

Raginfred was consecrated as archbishop on 28 January 899 by Arnaud, archbishop of Embrun in the presence of many prelates, including the bishops of Maurienne, Grenoble, Belley, Digne, Toulon, and Valence, and counts of the region.

He received the title of "Head of the Notaries of the Sacred Palace" (Latin: Sacri palatii nostri notaiorum summus) and obtained the functions of archchancellor of King Louis the Blind and in that capacity accompanied him in 900 to Italy.

He received several diplomas (in the sense of grants or charters) from the king between 902 and 905, mentioned with other documents in the Regeste dauphinois.

Raginfred last appears in documents on 26 October 905. The year of his death is not known exactly. According to the Catalogue of Bishops, he died on "30 April in the ninth year of his episcopate", which may refer to either 906 or 907.

His body was buried in the abbey church of St. Peter's in Vienne.
