= Vespasiano (given name) =

Vespasiano is an Italian masculine given name which may refer to:

- Vespasiano Anfiareo (1490–1564), Italian writer and calligrapher
- Vespasiano Bignami (1841–1929), Italian painter, art critic and caricaturist
- Vespasiano da Bisticci (1421–1498), Florentine humanist and librarian
- Vespasiano Colonna (c. 1485–1528), Italian nobleman and condottiero (mercenary leader)
- Vespasiano Genuino (1552–1637), Italian sculptor
- Vespasiano I Gonzaga (1531–1591), condottiero and founder of Sabbioneta, Lombardy
- Vespasiano Vincenzo Gonzaga (1621–1687), Italian noble and Viceroy of Valencia
- Vespasiano Strada (1582–1622), Italian painter and engraver

== See also ==
- Vespasian (name)
