= Saint Peter's church, Vienne (Isère) =

Church located in Vienne, France

Coordinates: 45.5230°N 4.8707°E

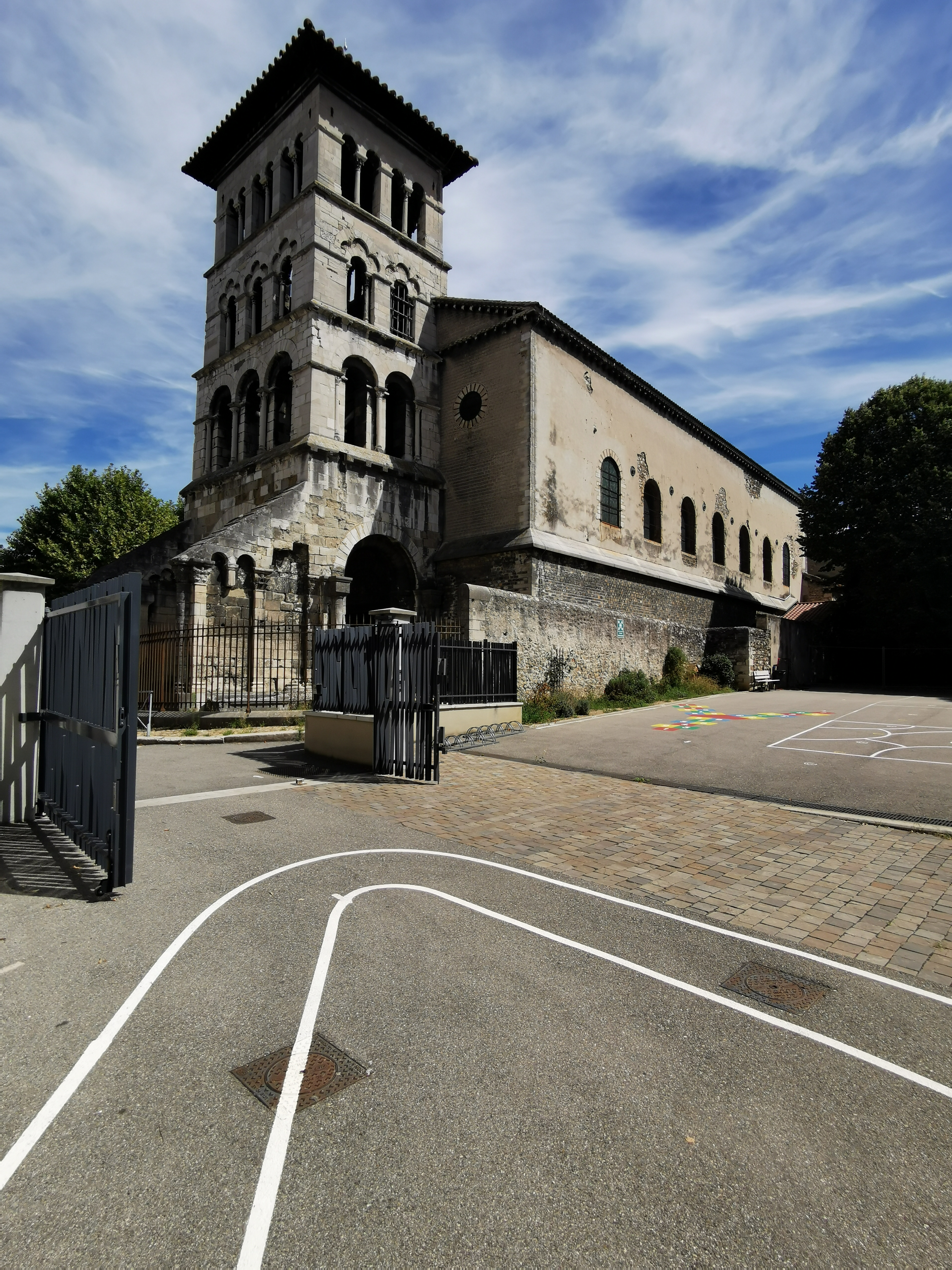

Religion
- Affiliation: Roman Catholic
- Diocese: Archdiocese of Lyon

Location
- Location: Isère, Rhône-Alpes, France
- Interactive map of Saint Peter's church, Vienne

Architecture
- Type: Basilica
- Style: Preromanesque
- Completed: Second half of the 5th century

Saint Peter's church (Saint-Pierre-le-Bas) in Vienne is one of the oldest surviving churches in France, situated in the Rhône-Alpes region. The church was added to the 1862 version of the list of France's Monuments historiques, created in 1819.

== History ==
Saint Peter's church was built at the end of the fifth century within the walls of the (Gallo-) Roman city, situated at a cemetery which replaced a former residential area. It was dedicated to saint Peter and Paul and used as a funerary Basilica. The church housed, over time, the remains of most of the bishops of Vienne, starting with Mamertus (died c. 475). Most of the early bishops of the city buried here are considered saints.

== Abbaye de Saint Pierre ==
In the 6th century a community of monks settled there, of which Leonianus was the first abbot. During the Middle Ages this abbey was the most influential of all of Vienne's monasteries. The church houses an important variety of relics, one of which is the water dish of the last supper. During the late Middle Ages and the early modern period the competition of the mendicant orders and then the Wars of Religion permanently weakened the abbey. The monks became canons and between 1780 and 1791 the former abbey was in union with the Abbey of Saint-Chef.

Initially transformed into a museum in 1809, building was restored during the 1860s. In 1872 the building was converted into a lapidary museum. The presentation of the collections has remained almost unchanged to the present day.

== Appearance ==
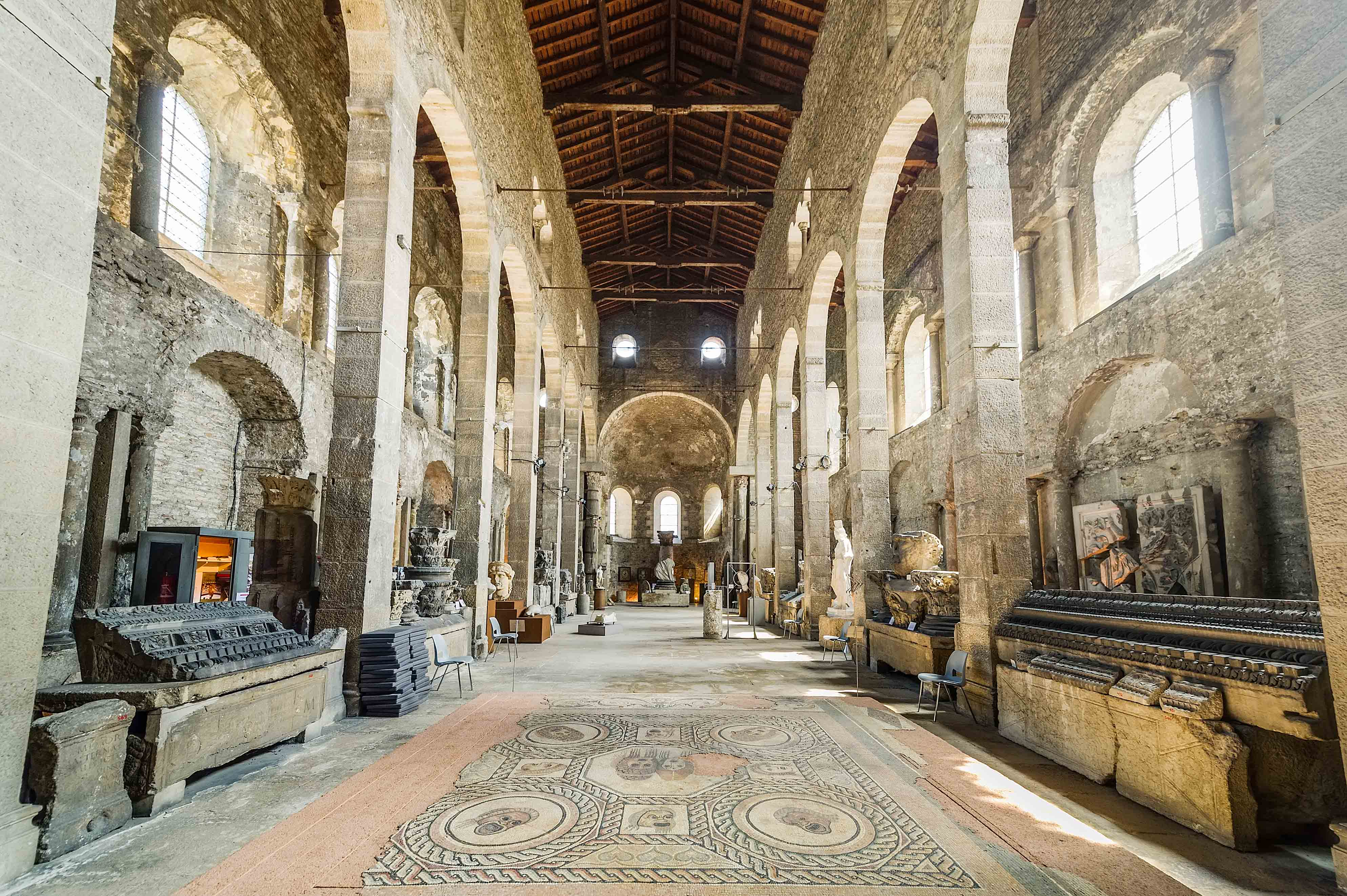
Interior of the nave today

The apse and the decor of the nave wall arches were likely built at the end of the 5th century and, as such are among the oldest remains. During the Carolingian era changes were made concerning the windows in the upper part of the nave.

The first important transformations took place at the end of the 11th century and the 12th century: the nave was divided into three parts by large arches. The bell tower porch is added to the West; the Notre-Dame Chapel, in the form of a Greek cross, is barrel-vaulted and outfitted with a dome; the South Portal is decorated with sculptures.

The remains of the 12th century murals can still be seen. In the 15th century several chapels were furnished but have disappeared since then. Few changes took place between the 15th century and 1780, when the whole of the building was covered in neo-classical stucco décor. The stucco was removed during the restoration in the 1860s.

Many fragments of the stone fence between the sanctuary for the clergy and the nave have been reused during the building of the bell tower in the 12th century, high up the front of the ancient façade. A monolithic altar from the 10th or 11th century is preserved in one of the museums of Vienne.

== Relics ==
Among the many preserved relics are those of the following saints:

- Saint Ado of Vienne
- Saint Avitus of Vienne
- Saint Crescens
- Saint Desiderius
- Saint Mamertus
