= Willicaire of Vienne =

8th century archbishop

Willicaire (Wilicarius), was archbishop of Vienne, in Dauphine, France in the eighth century. He is considered a saint of the Catholic Church locally.

== Archbishop of Vienne ==
Willicaire (sometimes Wilicaire, or Vulchaire) was archbishop of Vienna around the years 740.

He received from Pope Gregory III (731-741), the Pallium.

Louis Duchesne reports that according to the writings of Adon de Vienne (799-875), he "transported the relics of Saints Ferreol and Julien to Vienne as the previous basilica housing them having been burnt down by the Muslims" 1, around 731–734.

Wilicaire succeeded Austrebert as Bishop of Vienne. Following the invasion of the Saracens, he had the bones of Blessed Ferreol transferred with the head of the martyr Julien intra muros, and with them he buried martyrs of t the invasion.

St Wilicarius (Wilicaire) left his see in c.752 when it fell under Frankish persecution. He took refuge in Rome and then finally retired to the monastery of St Maurice where he died in 765.

He is revered as a saint, with a feast held on 13 June.

== Retirement ==
"Wounded by the procedures of Charles Martel, retired to the monastery of Agaune", he seems to resign his office at the beginning of the 740s to retire to the monastery of Saint-Maurice d'Agaune, in Valais.

Ulysse Chevalier, in the Regeste Dauphinois (1912), gives c. 552.

== Life in Saint-Maurice d'Agaune ==
The historian Chevalier says that "he becomes abbot, then bishop of Sion" .

It was mentioned In 765, that Bishop Wilcarius, who leads the community. The list of abbots produced by Leon Dupont Lachenal mentions him as abbot from 760 to 782, "Vulchaire, former Archbishop of Vienne and Bishop of Mentana (Nomentum) near Rome, Abbot of St-Maurice and Bishop of Sion".

During the Council of Attigny, convened around 762/765 by king Pepin le Bref, he was present and signed as archbishop of the abbey of Saint-Mauriceâ.Louis Duchesne sayys that he was mentioned in Agaune, in 771.

He should not be confused with Abbot Willicaire d'Agaune, who became archbishop of Sens in 769.

His death is placed in the year 782.
