= Council of Toulouse =

Council of the Roman Catholic Church

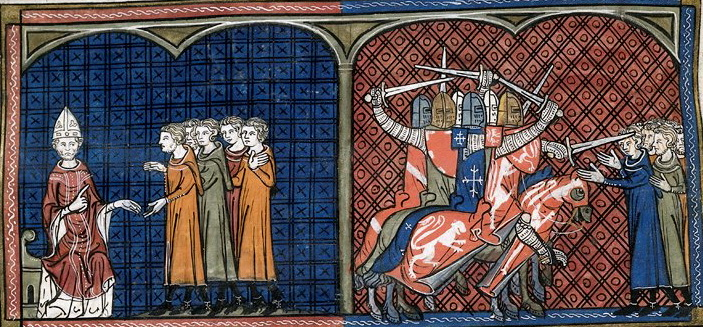
Pope Innocent III excommunicating the Albigensians (left), Massacre against the Albigensians by the crusaders.

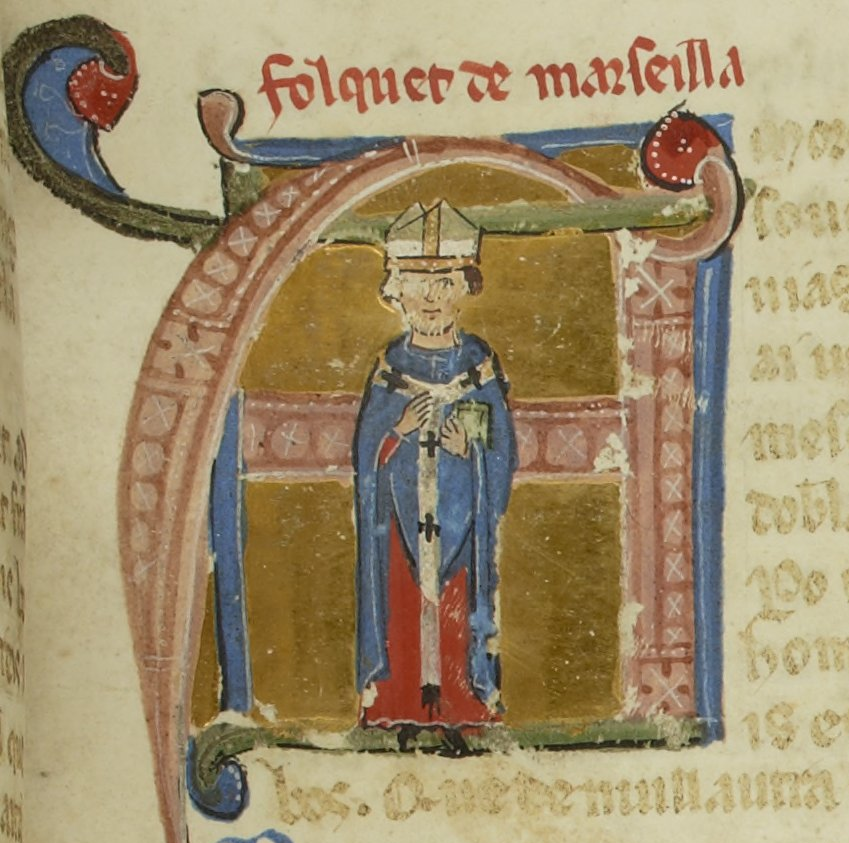
Folquet depicted holding a bible in BnF ms. 854 fol. 61.

The Council of Toulouse (1229) was a local Council of the Roman Catholic Church called by Folquet de Marselha, the Bishop of Toulouse, in 1229 AD. The council forbade lay people to read vernacular translations of the Bible.

== Background ==
The Council was called by the local bishop to address the perceived threat from the rapid growth of the Albigensian movement in 13th century southern France. The council resolved that a search in each parish was to be made for heretics (Albigensian and Cathar) and that if found their houses should be destroyed and that non-Latin translations of the Bible be destroyed and likewise for other unauthorised copies.

The Council pronounced:

"We prohibit also that the laity should be permitted to have the books of the Old and the New Testament; unless anyone from the motives of devotion should wish to have the Psalter or the Breviary for divine offices or the hours of the blessed Virgin; but we most strictly forbid their having any translation of these books."

== Legacy ==
Folquet de Marselha, Bishop of Toulouse died two years later in 1231, but in 1234 another council was held at Tarragona to regulate the procedure of the Inquisition, which was already in Toulouse in 1233 and to also ratify the findings of the Toulouse Council.

Canon two of this Tarragona council restated: “No one may possess the books of the Old and New Testaments, and if anyone possesses them he must turn them over to the local bishop within eight days, so that they may be burned”.
