= Dionysius of Vienne =

Saint Dionysius

Bishop of Vienne
- Died: 193
- Venerated in: Roman Catholic Church; Eastern Orthodox Church
- Canonized: Pre-congregation
- Feast: 8 May

Dionysius was Bishop of Vienne. He was among the ten missionaries sent by Pope St. Sixtus I with St. Peregrinus to Gaul. Dionysius later succeeded St. Justus as Bishop of Vienne, in Dauphiné, France.
