= Justus of Vienne =

Catholic bishop

Justus or Just was the fifth bishop of Vienne and lived in the 2nd century. Justus was also known from some spurious letters attributed to Pope Pius I.
