= Zoen Tencarari =

Italian canon lawyer, papal vice-legate and bishop

Zoen Tencarari was an Italian canon lawyer, papal vice-legate, and bishop of Avignon from 1240 to about 1261. He taught at the University of Bologna, where in 1256, he founded a college. He glossed the Compilatio quinta, and brought Henry of Segusio to the see of Sisteron.

He was a strong opponent of the Albigensians. He presided at the Council of Albi of 1254.

He had work done to improve the residence of the bishops at Noves.

== Notes ==
- Léon-Honoré Labande (1908), Avignon au 13eme siecle : l'eveque Zoen Tencarari et les Avignonnais
