= Florentius of Vienne =

Bishop of Vienne

Florentius is a saint of the Roman Catholic Church and a bishop of Vienne from the late 4th century, dated by his attendance at the Council of Valence in 374.

Florentius' feast day is locally celebrated on 3 January.

Florent or Florentinus is mentioned in the list of bishops of Vienne produced by archbishop Ado of Vienne (799-875) in his Chronicle, according to which however he lived in the previous century during the reigns of the emperors Volusianus (251-253) and Gallienus (253–260) as the 8th bishop of Vienne, and was martyred:

Florentinus, too, bishop of Vienna, distinguished himself by his way of life and his teaching; he remained in place until the reigns of Gallienus and Volusianus, and, in exile, accomplished his martyrdom.
