= Viver i Serrateix =

- Municipality
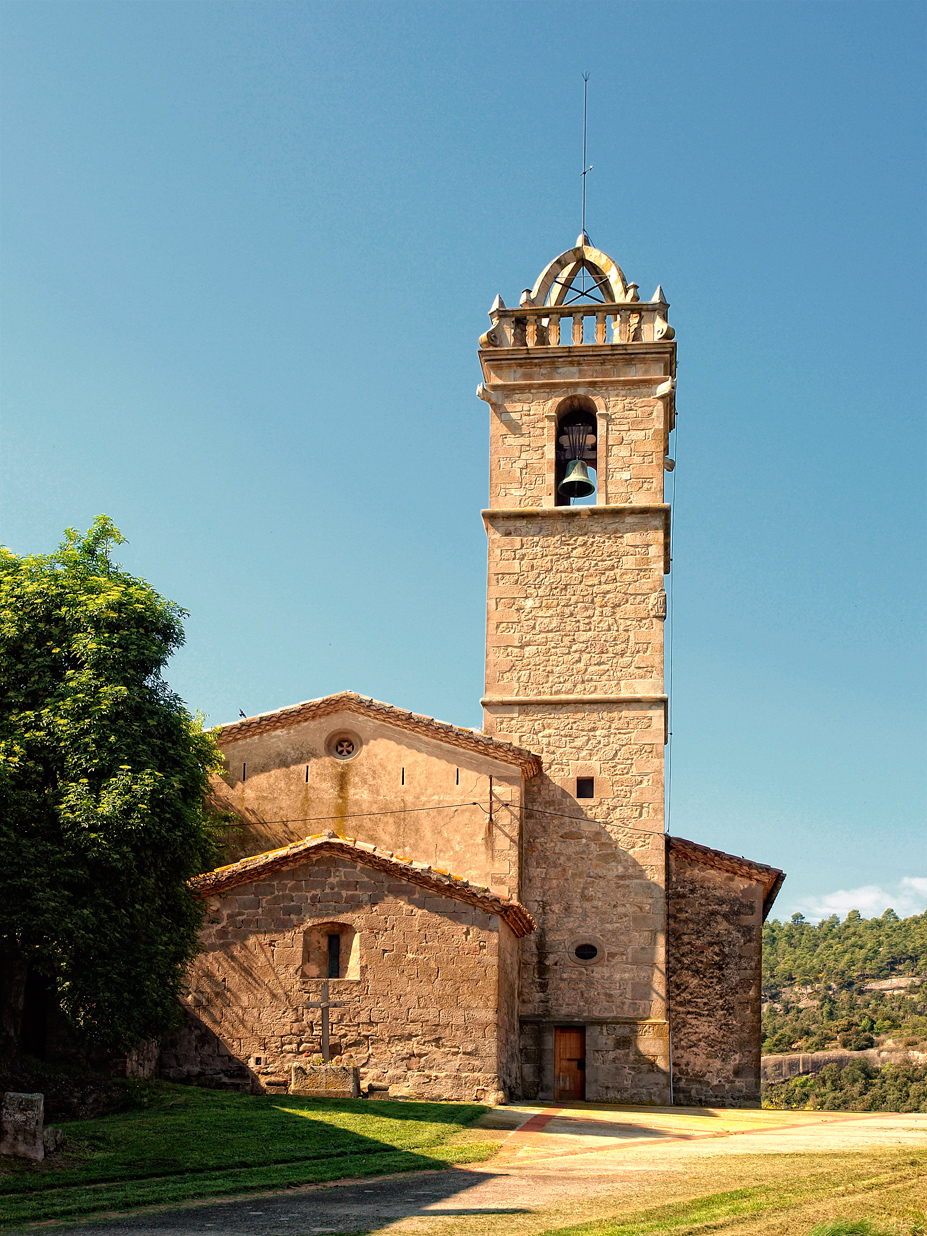
- St. Michael's church, Viver

- Coat of arms

- Map showing location within Berguedà

- Location in Catalonia Viver i Serrateix (Spain)
- Coordinates: 41°57′00″N 1°46′56″E
- Country: Spain
- Community: Catalonia
- Province: Barcelona
- Comarca: Berguedà

Government
  - Mayor: Isabel Serra Montañà (2015) (CiU)

Area
  - Total: 66.8 km^{2} (25.8 sq mi)
- Elevation: 729 m (2,392 ft)

Population (2025-01-01)
  - Total: 178
  - Density: 2.66/km^{2} (6.90/sq mi)
- Demonym(s): Viverenc, viverenca, serrateixenc, serrateixenca
- Website: viveriserrateix.cat

Viver i Serrateix (Catalan pronunciation: [biˈβej sərəˈteʃ]) is a municipality in the comarca of Berguedà, Catalonia. It comprises the towns of Viver (Catalan: [biˈβe]) and Serrateix (Catalan: [sərəˈteʃ]), as per the name.

== History ==
Santa Maria de Serrateix was established in 940. Viver and Serrateix was formerly controlled by the Barons of Viver, who had their castle and seat in the town. The barons retained possession of the municipality's lands until the 17th century, when they sold it to the Rajadell family.

The municipality was created when the two towns were united in the 19th century. Soon thereafter, the towns of Mondarn and Pujol de Planes were also added to the united municipality.

== Culture ==
The current parochial church of the municipality is what was formerly the Monastery of Santa Maria de Serrateix. It is Romanesque in style, and contains one of its three original apses. The adjoining cloister is in the neoclassical style, and was constructed in the 18th century.

At the center of the town of Viver is the Church of Sant Miquel, consecrated in 1187. The present building, however, dates from the 17th century, and is principally in the Renaissance style, with late Gothic influences. Its belltower was built in 1798.

The former Church of Sant Pere is currently in use as the town hall.

== Economy ==
The principal occupation of the municipality's inhabitants is animal husbandry, and especially sheep and goats. Cereal cultivation is also widespread, especially of wheat, rye, and barley.
