= George of Vienne =

Archbishop of Vienne

Saint George of Vienne
- Died: 7th Century AD
- Honored in: Eastern Orthodox Church
- Feast: 2 November

Saint George of Vienne (French: Georges de Vienne) was bishop of Vienne in France in the 7th century. He may previously have been bishop of Agde. His year of death is uncertain: both c. 670 and 699 have been suggested.

He was canonised in 1251. His feast day is celebrated on 2 November.
