= Martin of Vienne =

French Catholic bishop and saint

Saint Martin of Vienne was the legendary third bishop of Vienne, in France, believed to have lived in the 2nd (or 3rd) century. He is venerated as a saint by the Catholic Church and the Eastern Orthodox Church, with a feast day celebrated locally in Vienne on 1 July.

Although he is mentioned in the 8th century by Archbishop Ado in his Chronicles, it has since been questioned whether he ever existed.

A district and a bridge in the old town of Vienne are named after him, as is the town of Saint-Martin-l'Ars, in the department of Vienne.
