= Jerome of Vienne =

Bishop of Vienne, France

Hieronymus (or Jerome), born about 350-360 was bishop of Vienne, from May to July 421.

== Life ==
Born into a patrician family from the west of Gaul, Hieronymus was a centurion in the Roman army in the Battle of Adrianople against the Ostrogoths in 378. Following this Roman defeat, he seems to have ceased his military career and turned to the life of hermit but there is no certainty for the period from 378 to 421. In 421, after the death of the bishop Simplicius of Vienne, he was elected to succeed him and became the fourth bishop of Vienne in France. He fell ill shortly after becoming bishop and died in July 421, only two months after his election.

The succession of Bishops in Vienne during the 5th century is obscure, and some sources do not even mention him. Hieronymus is the only bishop of Vienne until the 8th century that has not been made a saint.
