= Namatius (bishop of Vienne) =

Namatius (died 558/60) was the rector of Provence under the Merovingians and later bishop of Vienne from c. 552 until his death in office. He is probably identical to the person with the same name recorded among the attendants at the Council of Orange in 529.

Namatius' wife, Euphrasia, became a nun after his death. She was noted for her generosity to the poor.

== Sources ==
- Klingshirn, William E. (1994). Caesarius of Arles: the Making of a Christian Community in Late Antique Gaul. Cambridge University Press.
- Brennan, Brian (1985). "Episcopae: Bishops' Wives Viewed in Sixth-Century Gaul". Church History. 54 (3): 311–21. doi:10.2307/3165657. JSTOR 3165657. S2CID 161325550.
