= Vespasien Gribaldi =

Archbishop of Vienne from 1569 to 1575

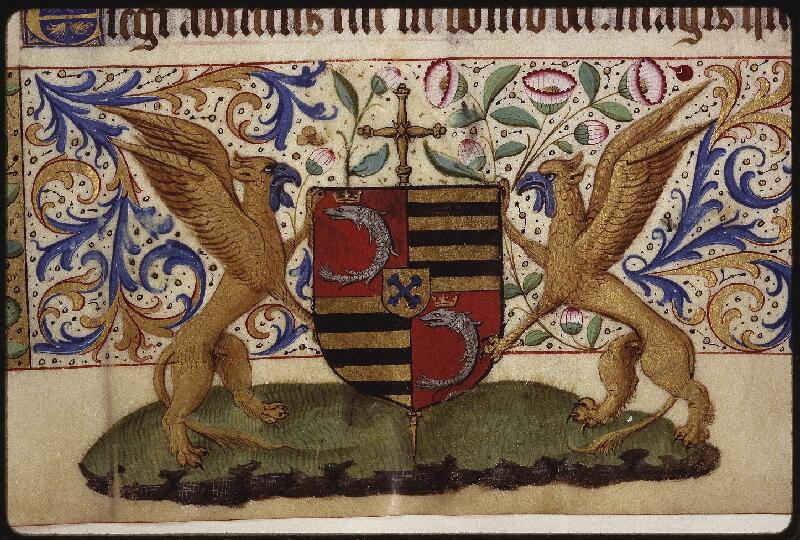
- Coat of arms of Vespasien Gribaldi
- Archdiocese: Roman Catholic Archdiocese of Vienne
- Appointed: 24 January 1569
- In office: 24 January 1569 – 1575

Orders
- Ordination: 25 April 1569

Personal details
- Born: c. 1531 Chieri
- Died: February 21, 1623 (aged 92)
- Denomination: Catholic

Vespasien Gribaldi (c. 1531 – 21 February 1623) was the archbishop of Vienne from 1569 to 1575.

== Early life ==
It is unknown when exactly Gribaldi was born, however it was likely around 1531. He was born in the town of Chieri.

== Time as Archbishop ==
Gribaldi was appointed as Archbishop of Vienne on 24 January 1569, and would be ordained by Pope Pius V three months later on 25 April. He resigned from the position five years later in 1575.

== Later life ==
Not much is known about Gribaldi's life after he resigned from his position of Archbishop in 1575, however it is known that he remained involved with the church. He died on 21 February 1623, at the age of 92.
