= Santa Maria, Serrateix =

Coordinates: 41°56′47″N 1°46′36″E

Santa Maria de Serrateix
- Monestir de Santa Maria (Catalan)
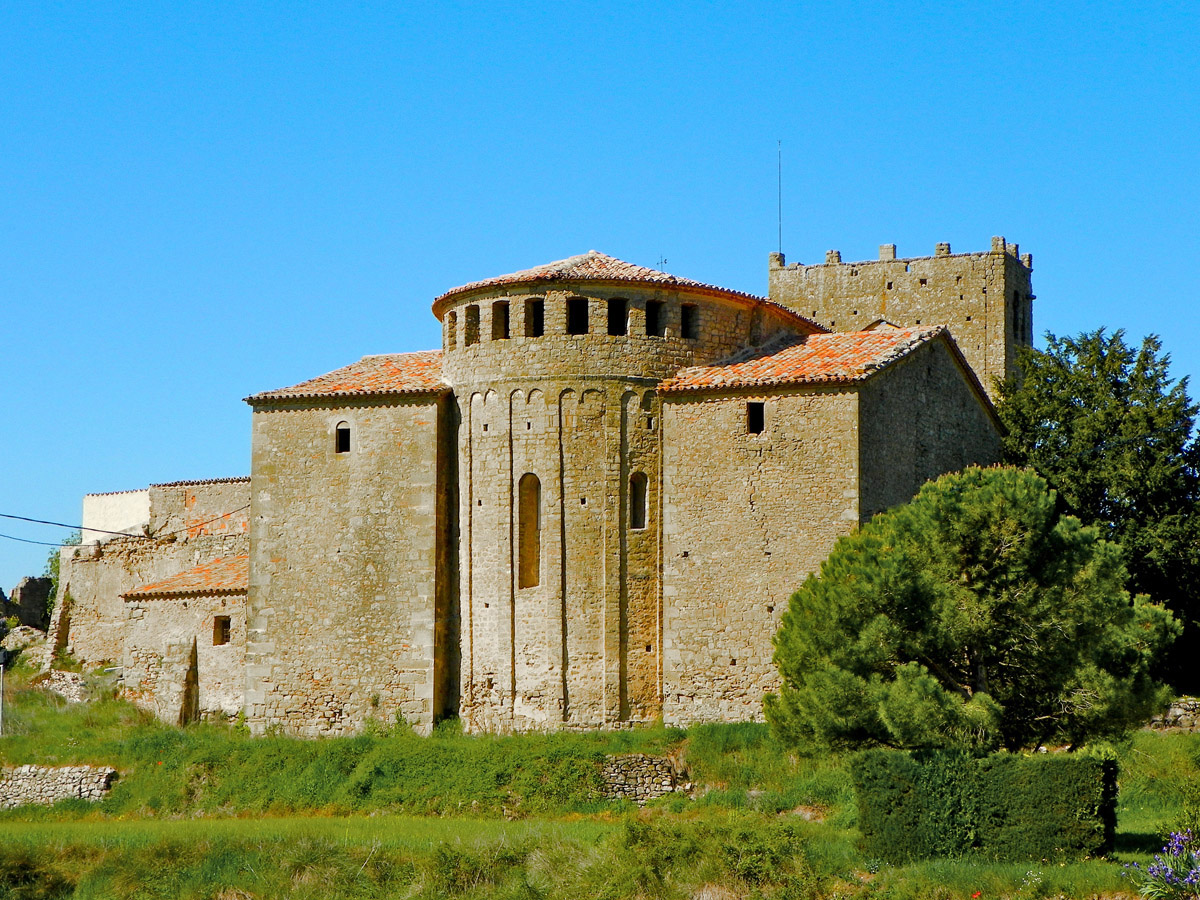
- Santa Maria de Serrateix

- Location within Catalonia
- Location: Viver i Serrateix, Catalonia, Spain

Site notes
- Architectural style: Neoclassical

Spanish Cultural Heritage
- Official name: Monasterio de Santa María
- Type: Non-movable
- Criteria: Monument
- Designated: June 1, 1999
- Reference no.: RI-51-0010218

Santa Maria de Serrateix is the Romanesque church of a former Benedictine abbey located on the BV-4235 road in Serrateix in the comarca of Berguedà, Catalonia.

== History ==
The monastery dates to c. 940 when a group of monks settled in the area. From 977, it came under the protection of the Counts of Cerdanya and Besalú while Froila became the abbot (977-993). Housing 13 monks, it later received donations from Oliba Cabreta (whose sarcophagus lies here) and his brother Miró. A new church built in 1077 was consecrated in 1126. In the fourteenth century, while only six monks were living there, the bell tower was destroyed but was rebuilt under the abbot Berenguer de Lluçà in 1373. The monastery later came under the authority of the Bishop of Urgell.

The interior of the Romanesque church was completely remodelled in the Neoclassical style between 1798 and 1827. The cloister, also Neoclassical, was completed in 1793 by Josep Torrevedella of Casserres. The buildings suffered considerable damage during the Spanish Civil War that destroyed several monastic dependencies. The tomb of Abbot Berenguer de Torigues was declared a Bien de Interés Cultural monument in 1982, now preserved in the Museu Diocesà i Comarcal de Solsona. Santa Maria de Serrateix became a Bien de Interés Cultural site in its own right on 1 June 1999.
