= José Vespasien =

French basketball player

Personal information
- Born: April 1, 1976 (age 50) Villeurbanne, France
- Listed height: 2.02 m (6 ft 8 in)
- Position: Power forward

Career history
- 2002–2003: Dijon

José Vespasien (born April 1, 1976 in Villeurbanne, France) is a French basketball player who played 26 games for the French Pro-A league club Dijon during the 2002–2003 season.
