= Desiderius of Vienne =

Bishop of Vienne

Desiderius of Fontenelle
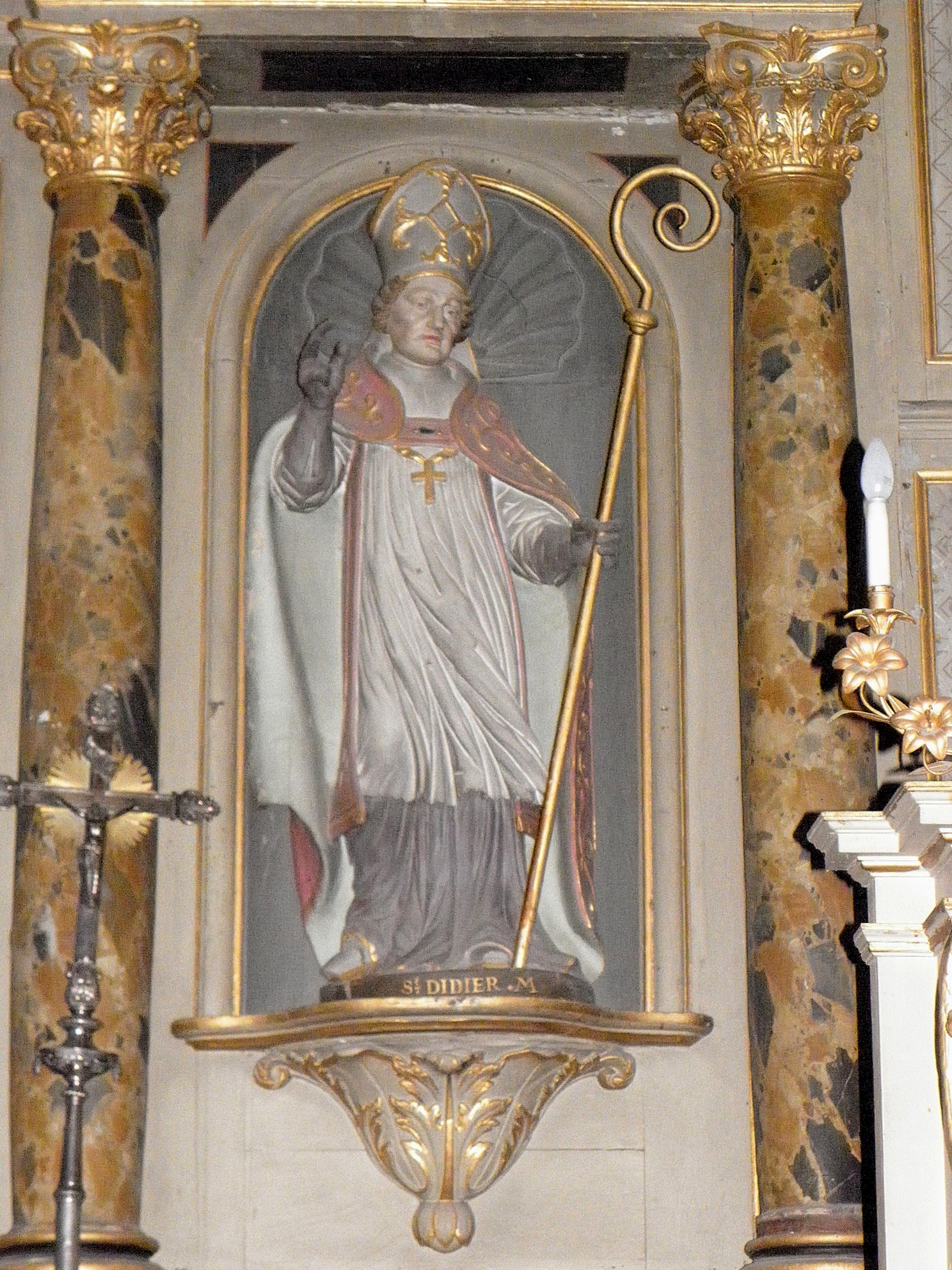

Archbishop of Vienne
- Born: Autun, Gaul
- Died: c. 607
- Venerated in: Roman Catholic Church; Eastern Orthodox Church
- Feast: February 11 and May 23 (Roman Martyrology and East)

Desiderius of Vienne (died 607) was a martyred archbishop of Vienne and a chronicler.

== Life ==
Nothing is known about his early years. In 603, in a conflict with Brunhilda of Austrasia, the legitimacy of whose children he had attacked, he was deposed after she combined forces with Aridius, bishop of Lyon. He was stoned to death, some years later, at the order of King Theuderic II of Burgundy.

He was rebuked by Gregory the Great for his interest in the pagan classics, in a letter provoked by the schooling he was providing for his clergy.

== Veneration ==
He is venerated as a saint in the Catholic Church, with his feast days on May 26. In the Eastern Orthodox Church, his feast is celebrated on May 23. A hagiographical work was written about him by the Visigothic king Sisebuto, during the 7th century. A later life was written by Ado of Vienne.
