= Simplicius of Vienne =

Bishop of Vienne, France

Saint Simplicius of Vienne (French: Simplice de Vienne), otherwise Simplides (French: Simplide), was a bishop of Vienne in the Dauphiné, France, from around the end of the fourth century and the beginning of the fifth century. He is venerated as a saint of the Catholic Church.

Simplicius apparently attended the Council of Turin which probably took place in either 398 or 400. Gregory of Tours cites a lost letter of Paulinus of Nola (died 431) as having praised Simplicius, considering him "one of the most worthy bishops of his time".

His feast day is celebrated on 11 February.
