= Claudius of Vienne =

Bishop of Vienne, France

Saint Claudius of Vienne (French: Claude de Vienne) was a bishop of Vienne in the Dauphiné, France, in the first half of the fifth century. He is considered a saint of the Roman Catholic Church.

He attended the Council of Orange in 441 and the Council of Vaison in 442.

Salvianus dedicated his work, now lost, on Ecclesiastes to Claudius.

His feast day is celebrated on 1 June. He is further celebrated on 1 July on the collective feast of all the bishop saints of Vienne with Saint Martin.
