= Jean de Nant =

Personal details
- Died: 7th of October 1426

Bishop of Vienne
- In office 1405–1423
- Preceded by: Thiébaud de Rougemont
- Succeeded by: Jean de Norry

Bishop of Paris
- In office 1423–1426
- Preceded by: Jean de La Rochetaillée
- Succeeded by: Jacques du Chastelier

Jean de Nant (died 7th of October 1426) was Bishop of Vienne from 1405 to 1423 and Bishop of Paris from 1423 until his death.

== Life ==
Jean was born of the "illustrious" burgundian Nanton family. He was archdeacon of Rouen before being elected archbishop of Vienne in 1405.

The previous years had seen conflicts between his predecessor, Thiébaud de Rougemont, who had been granted temporal authority on the city by Charles VI, the local nobility and the populace. As soon as he took the post, Jean dispatched an envoy to Grenoble to negotiate with royal officials. He also pardoned those that had been excomunicated by Thiébaud.

In 1409, Jean participated in the Council of Pisa as representative of Vienne. On his return he found that the civic officials had usurped his political power. The population sided with them. This led to the episcopal palace being put under siege in 1414. After the end of the conflcts, Jean attended the Council of Constance.

In 1423, Pope Martin V transferred Jean to the bishopric of Paris. Here he swore an oath to Henry V of England.

In 1425 Jean and the inquisitor of the faith started a trial against members of the clergy and layman accused of witchraft. After a dispute arose between the two, the pope referred the case to the bishops of Thérouanne and Noyon.

Jean died on the 7th of October 1426.

Catholic Church titles
Preceded by Thiébaud de Rougemont	Bishop of Vienne; 1405 - 1423	Succeeded by Jean de Norry
Preceded by Jean de La Rochetaillée	Bishop of Paris; 1423 - 1426	Succeeded by Jacques du Chastelier
