= Vienne Cathedral =

- Cathédrale Saint-Maurice de Vienne
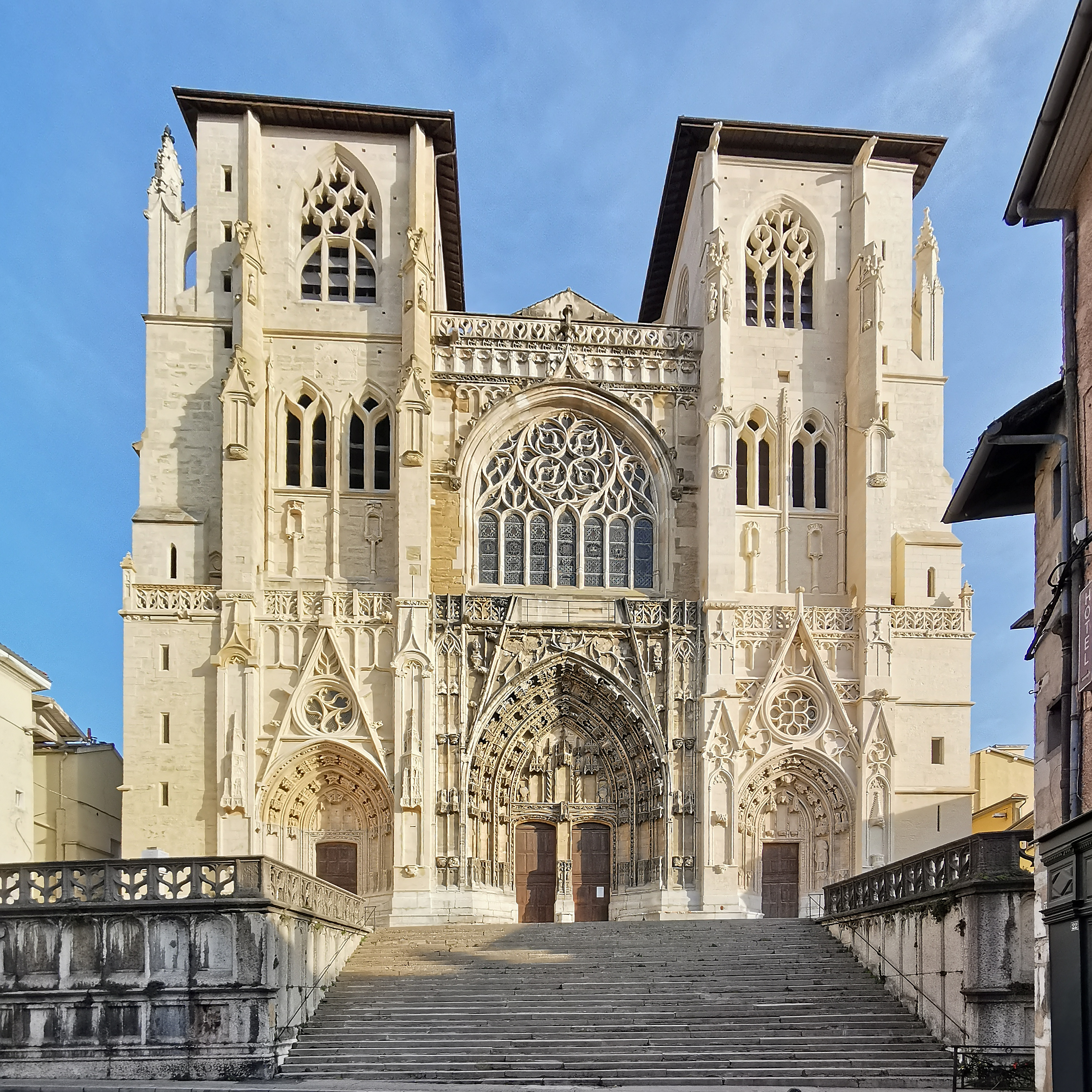
- Saint Maurice, facade
- Vienne Cathedral
- 45°31′27″N 4°52′23″E
- Location: Vienne, Isère
- Country: France
- Denomination: Roman Catholic Church
- Website: cathedraledevienne.com

History
- Status: Co-cathedral (since 1801)

Architecture
- Functional status: Active
- Heritage designation: Monument historique
- Architectural type: church
- Style: French Gothic
- Groundbreaking: c. 1130
- Completed: 1529

Administration
- Archdiocese: Roman Catholic Diocese of Grenoble-Vienne

Clergy
- Bishop: Guy de Kerimel

Monument historique
- Official name: Cathédrale Saint-Maurice de Vienne
- Type: Église
- Designated: 1840
- Reference no.: PA00117325

Vienne Cathedral (French: Cathédrale Saint-Maurice de Vienne) is a medieval Roman Catholic church in the city of Vienne, France. Dedicated to Saint Maurice, it was the episcopal see of the primate of the ancient Septem Provinciae and of the Archdiocese of Vienne until its abolition confirmed by the Concordat of 1801. It today serves as co-cathedral of the Diocese of Grenoble-Vienne. The present-day building, erected from 1130 onwards, was classified a French national heritage site (monument historique) in the list of historic monuments of 1840.

== Construction history ==
Mentioned as the burial place of the Burgundian king Boso of Provence in 887, no traces are left from the former church buildings at the site. Construction works at Vienne Cathedral are documented under the tenure of Archbishop Léger from 1030 to 1070; on 9 February 1119, Archbishop Guy of Burgundy was crowned Pope here (as Callixtus II).

The construction of the preserved church was begun in a Late Romanesque style about 1130. Built over a long period, Gothic modifications and extensions were carried out until its consecration by Pope Innocent IV on 20 April 1251. From 16 October 1311, Pope Clement V convened the Council of Vienne, where the clergy resolved upon the dissolution of the Knights Templar. The facade was added in the 16th century, with the capstone ceremony held in 1529.

The present-day building is a basilica, with three aisles and an apse, but no ambulatory or transepts, 315 feet in length, 118 feet wide and 89 feet in height. The most striking portion is the west front, which rises majestically from a terrace overhanging the Rhône. However, the sculptural decoration was badly damaged by plundering Huguenot forces under Baron François de Beaumont in 1562, during the French Wars of Religion.

In the wake of the French Revolution, the Vienne archdiocese was dissolved and the former cathedral became a plain parish church, while the surrounding premises temporarily served as barns or barracks and eventually were demolished. The episcopal territory was transferred mostly to the Diocese of Grenoble, while the title was added first to that of the Archbishops of Lyon, known between 1822 and 2006 as the Archbishops of Lyon-Vienne, and then from 2006 to that of the Bishops of Grenoble, now known as the Bishops of Grenoble-Vienne.

== Sources ==
- Vienne Cathedral at Structurae

Media related to Vienne Cathedral at Wikimedia Commons
