= Council of Tarragona =

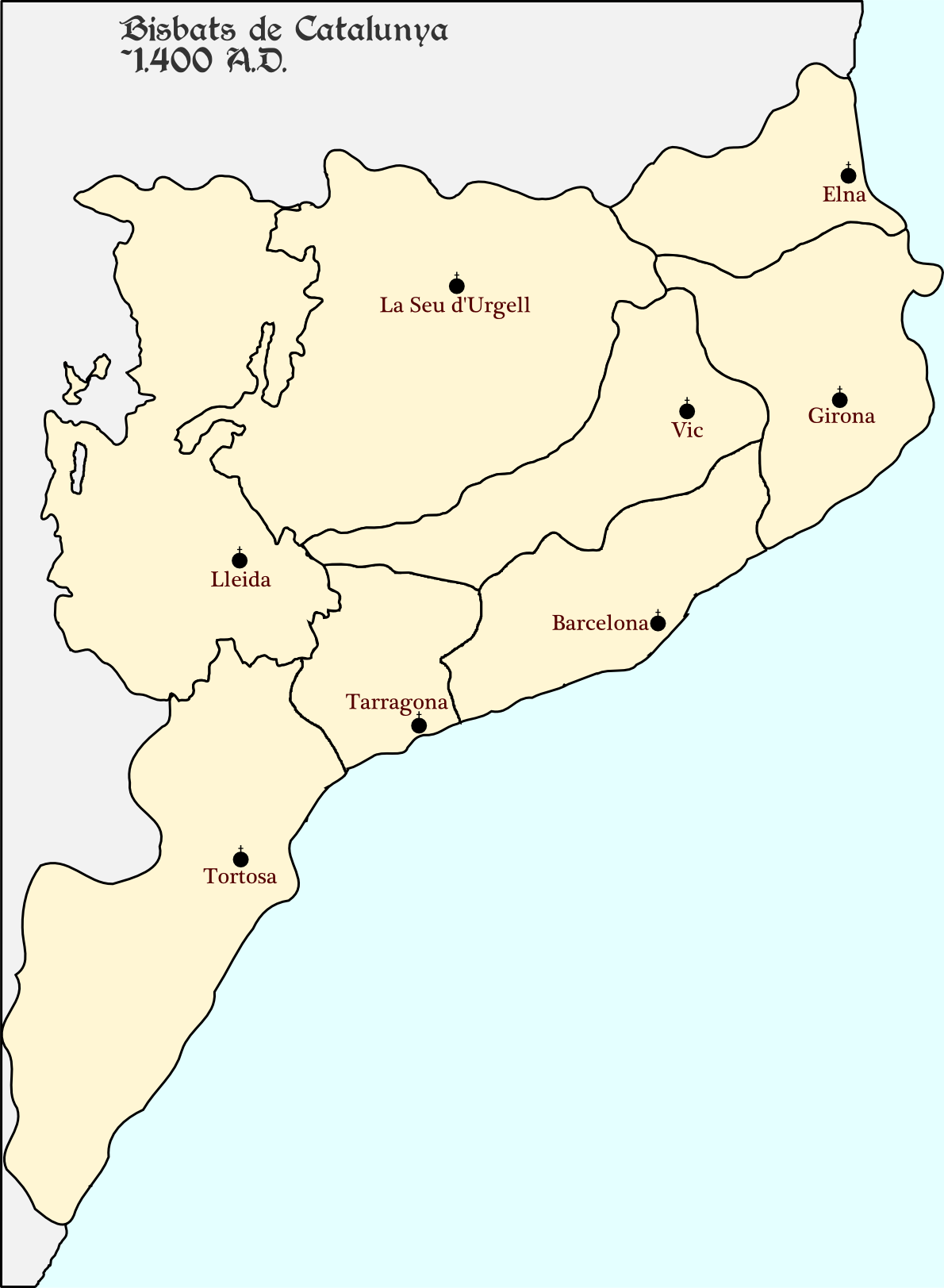
Extent of Catalan dioceses circa 1400 AD

The Councils of Tarragona were several provincial Councils of the Roman Catholic Church held in the city of Tarragona, in Catalonia, Spain.

- The First Council of Tarragona was held by Archbishop John of Tarragona, on 6 November 516. This council assembled all the bishops of his province, thus becoming the first provincial council of Tarragona. There were ten bishops were present. In 517 he assembled another provincial council in Girona.
- Subsequent councils were held in 1242 and 1312.
