= Council of Lyon =

The Council of Lyon may refer to a number of synods or councils of the Roman Catholic Church, held in Lyon, France or in nearby Anse.

Previous to 1313, a certain Abbé Martin counted twenty-eight synods or councils held at Lyons or at Anse.

Some of these synods include:

- Synod of Lyon (before 523), at which eleven of the members of the Synod of Epaone (517) were present
- Synod of Lyon (567), in the presence of Pope John III and during which bishops Salonius of Embrun and Sagittarius of Gap were condemned
- Synod of Lyon (829), one of four Frankish synods held simultaneously
- First Council of Lyon (1245; Pope Innocent IV; regarding the Crusades)
- Second Council of Lyon (1274; Pope Gregory X; regarding union with the Eastern Orthodox and other matters)
