= Ulysse Chevalier =

French bibliographer and historian (1841–1923)

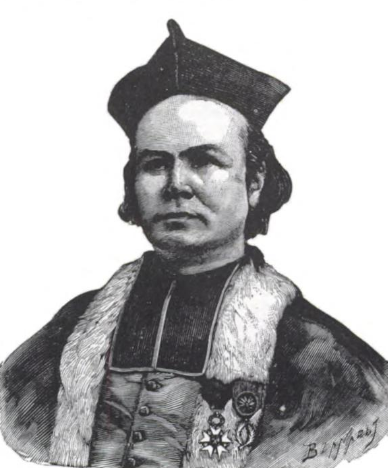
- Ulysse Chevalier ca. 1909
- Born: Cyr Joseph Ulysse Chevalier; 24 February 1841; Rambouillet, France
- Died: 27 October 1923 (aged 82); Romans-sur-Isère, France
- Occupations: Catholic priest, historian, bibliographer

Academic background
- Education: Major Seminary of Romans-sur-Isère

Academic work
- Institutions: Major Seminary of Romans-sur-Isère, Catholic University of Lyon, Académie des Inscriptions et Belles-Lettres
- Main interests: Middle Ages, church history, relics
- Notable works: Répertoire des sources historiques du Moyen Âge

Cyr Joseph Ulysse Chevalier (24 February 1841 – 27 October 1923) was a French Catholic priest, bibliographer, and historian who specialized in the European Middle Ages. He is principally remembered for his Répertoire des sources historiques du Moyen Âge ("Repertory of historical sources on the Middle Ages") and for his critical work on the authenticity of the Shroud of Turin and the Holy House of Loreto.

== Life and works ==
Chevalier was born in 1841 Rambouillet in the Île-de-France region, where his father was stationed as a military physician. In 1852 the family returned to its hometown in Romans-sur-Isère in southeastern France, where Chevalier pursued ecclesiastical studies and was ordained as a Catholic priest in 1867. Under the guidance of Léopold Victor Delisle, to whom he had been recommended, Chevalier launched a scholarly career focused primarily on the history of the Dauphiné.

Chevalier's historical works include studies of the cartularies of the church and of the town of Die (1868), of the abbey of Saint-André-le-Bas in Vienne (1869), of Bonnevaux Abbey (1889), and of the abbey of Saint-Chaffre at Le Monastier-sur-Gazeille (1884). Chevalier also compiled inventories of the archives of the dauphins of Viennois, and a Bibliothèque liturgique in six volumes (1893–1897), the third and fourth volumes of which constitute the Repertorium hymnologicum, containing more than 20,000 articles.

Chevalier's principal scholarly contribution is the Répertoire des sources historiques du Moyen Âge. The first part, Bio-bibliographie (1875–1886), contains the names of all the historical personages alive between the years 1 and 1500 who are mentioned in printed books, together with precise references. The second part, Topo-bibliographie (1894–1903), contains not only the names of places mentioned in books on the history of the Middle Ages, but, in a general way, everything not included in the Bio-bibliographie.

=== Shroud of Turin ===
Chevalier was noted for his independent and critical attitude towards the study of relics. Between 1899 and 1903 he published several studies arguing that the Shroud of Turin could not be the actual burial cloth of Jesus of Nazareth, but dated instead from the 14th century. Chevalier brought to light a memorandum from 1389 in which the Bishop of Troyes declared that the Shroud was a clever forgery and that the artist responsible had confessed to it years before.

Chevalier's work on the Shroud of Turin generated controversy within the Catholic Church during his lifetime. More recently, defenders of the Shroud's authenticity like the paleographer Emmanuel Poulle have accused Chevalier of manipulating the historical documents to make his case. Meanwhile historians skeptical of the Shroud such as Andrea Nicolotti of University of Turin have defended the rigour of Chevalier's work. Chevalier's conclusion that the Shroud of Turin was fabricated shortly before it was first exhibited in 1355 at the collegiate church of Lirey, in northeastern France, is consistent with the results of the 1988 carbon dating results, which found that the linen cloth of the Shroud had been made between the years 1260 and 1390.

=== Holy House of Loreto ===
In 1906 Chevalier published the book Notre Dame de Lorette. Étude critique sur l’authenticité de la Santa Casa ("Our Lady of Loreto. Critical Study of the authenticity of the Holy House"). There Chevalier studied the history behind the pious legend according to which the house of Mary the mother of Jesus had been transported by angels from Nazareth to Tersatto (in modern Croatia) and then to Loreto in Italy, where it forms the centerpiece of the Basilica della Santa Casa. Chevalier found that no authentic documents mention that miraculous translation until 1472, 180 years after it was alleged to have taken place, and that there are no records of any comparable edifice having been venerated in Nazareth as the home of Mary.

== Influence and recognition ==
In 1881, Chevalier became professor of archaeology at the seminary of Romans-sur-Isère in 1881. In 1887, he was appointed professor of church history at the Catholic Institute of Lyon, a post he held until 1906. He was elected to the Académie des Inscriptions et Belles-Lettres in 1912, and in 1922 he was appointed by the French government as officer of the Legion of Honour. He also received honorary doctorates from the universities of Louvain, Oxford, and Leipzig.

Within the Catholic Church, Chevalier was appointed honorary canon of the cathedrals of Valence, Lyon, Marseille, Grenoble, and Bayeux. His work on relics was notably promoted by the English Jesuit Herbert Thurston.
