= Bernard of Vienne =

Bernard of Vienne, Bernard of Romans
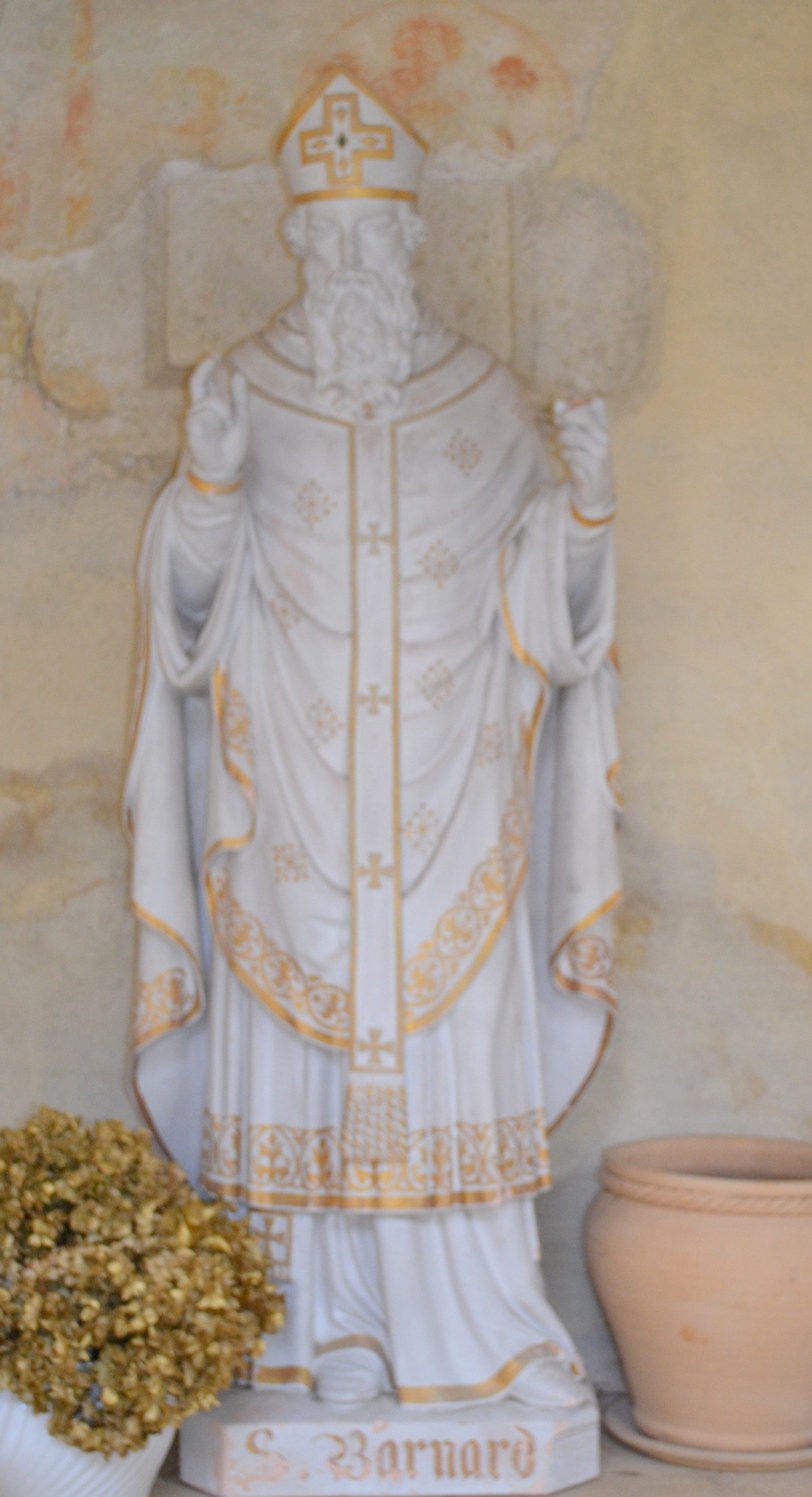
- Statue of Saint Bernard at Ambronay
- Born: 778; Lyon, Francia
- Died: 23 January 842 (aged 63–64); Vienne, Francia
- Venerated in: Roman Catholic Church, Eastern Orthodox Church
- Canonized: 1907 (cultus confirmed)
- Feast: January 23
- Patronage: Agricultural workers

Ordination history
History
Episcopal consecration
- Consecrated by: Leidrad
- Date: 810

Bernard of Vienne, also known as Bernard of Romans (French: Barnard de Romans; 778 – 23 January 842) was archbishop of Vienne from 810 until his death. He is venerated as a saint by the Catholic Church.

== Biography ==
Before his monastic career, Bernard was a soldier under Charlemagne. The death of his mother and father after seven years of military service had a deep impact on Bernard and caused him to spend all his wealth on charitable purposes, dividing it into three parts: for the church, for the poor, for his children. He bought the monastery in Ambronay, of which he became abbot. In 810, after resistance, he became archbishop of Vienne.

Bernard, like many other clerics, supported the unity of the Frankish Empire. He took a position on the side of Lothair I against his father Louis the Pious, for which he was deposed in the Synod of Thionville, although this was never carried out.

Towards the end of his life, he retired to a spot on the banks of the river Isère, where the town of Romans is today.
