= Archdiocese of Vienne =

Former French archdiocese

Coordinates: 45.52°N 4.87°E

The Archbishopric of Vienne, named after its episcopal seat in Vienne in the Isère département of Southern France, was a metropolitan Roman Catholic archdiocese. It is now part of the Archdiocese of Lyon.

== History ==
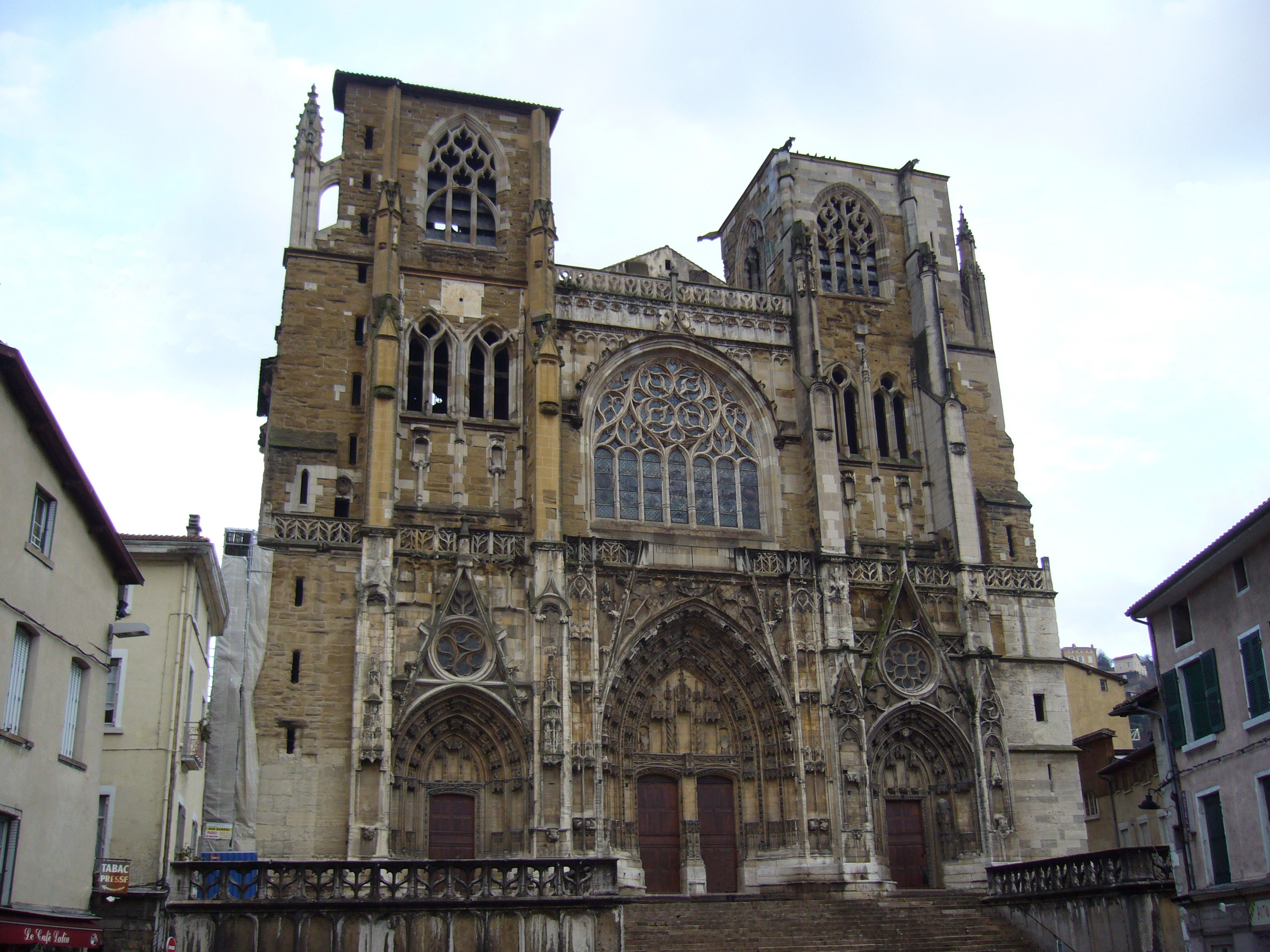
Vienne Cathedral

The legend according to which Crescens, the first Bishop of Vienne, is identical with the Crescens of Saint Paul's Second Letter to Timothy, iv, 20 certainly postdates the letter of Pope Zosimus to the Church of Arles (417) and the letter of the bishops of Gaul in 451; because, although both these documents allude to the claims to glory which Arles owes to St. Trophimus, neither of them mentions Crescens. Archbishop Ado of Vienne (860–875) set afoot this legend of the Apostolic origin of the See of Vienne and put down St. Zachary, St. Martin and St. Verus, later successors of Crescens, as belonging to the Apostolic period. This legend was confirmed by the Recueil des privilèges de l'Eglise de Viene, which, however, was not compiled under the supervision of the future Pope Callistus II, as M. Gundlach maintained, but a little earlier, about 1060, as Louis Duchesne proved. This collection contains the pretended letters of a series of popes, from Pius I to Paschal II, and sustains the claims of the Church of Vienne. Le Livre épiscopal de l'archevêque Léger (1030–1070) included both the inventions of Ado and the forged letters of the Recueil.

It is historically certain that Verus, present at the Council of Arles (314), was the fourth Bishop of Vienne. In the beginning, the twelve cities of the two Roman Vienne provinces were under the ecclesiastical jurisdiction of the Archbishop of Vienne, but when Arles was made an archbishopric, at the end of the fourth century, the see of Vienne grew less important. The disputes that later arose between it and the metropolitan of Arles concerning their respective antiquity are well known in ecclesiastical history.

In 450, Pope Leo I gave the Archbishop of Vienne the right to ordain the Bishops of Tarantaise, Valence, Geneva and Grenoble. Many vicissitudes followed, and the territorial limit of the powers of Metropolitan of Vienne followed the wavering frontier of the Kingdom of Burgundy and in 779, was considerably restricted by the organization of a new ecclesiastical province comprising Tarantaise, Aosta (in Italy) and Sitten (or Sion in French; in Switzerland).

In 1120 Calixtus II, who had been Bishop of Vienne, decided that the Archbishop of Vienne should have for suffragans the Bishop of Grenoble, Bishop of Valence, Bishop of Die, Bishop of Viviers, Bishop of Geneva, and Bishop of Maurienne; that the Archbishop of Tarantaise should obey him, notwithstanding the fact that this archbishop himself had suffragans, that he should exercise the primacy over the province of Bourges, province of Narbonne, province of Bordeaux, province of Aix, province of Auch and province of Embrun, and that, as the metropolitans of both provinces already bore the title of primate, the Archbishop of Vienne should be known as the "Primate of Primates".

In 1023, the Archbishops of Vienne became secular lords paramount. They had the title of Count, making them prince-archbishops, and when in 1033 the Kingdom of Burgundy-Arles was reunited to the Holy Roman Empire, they retained their independence. They obtained from the empire the title of Archchancellors of the Kingdom of Arles (1157).

Besides the four Bishops of Vienne heretofore mentioned, others are honoured as saints. According to the chronology created by M. Duchesne, they are: St. Justus, St. Dionysius, St. Paracodes, St. Florentius (about 374), St. Lupicinus, St. Simplicius (about 400), St. Paschasius, St. Nectarius, St. Nicetas (about 449), St. Mamertus (died 475 or 476), who instituted the rogation days, whose brother Claudianus Mamertus was known as a theologian and poet, and during whose episcopate St. Leonianus held for forty years the post of grand penitentiary at Vienne; St. Avitus (494 – 5 February, 518), St. Julianus (about 520–533), Pantagathus (about 538), Namatius (died 559), St. Evantius (died 584–586), St. Verus (586), St. Desiderius (Didier) 596–611, St. Domnolus (about 614), St. Ætherius, St. Hecdicus, St. Chaoaldus (about 654–664), St. Bobolinus, St. Georgius, St. Deodatus, St. Blidrannus (about 680), St. Eoldus, St. Eobolinus, St. Barnardus (810–841), noted for his conspiracies in favour of the sons of Louis the Pious, St. Ado (860–875), author of a universal history and two martyrologies, St. Thibaud (end of the tenth century).

Among its later bishops were Guy of Burgundy (1084–1119), who became Pope Callixtus II; Christophe de Beaumont, who occupied the see of Vienne for seven months of the year 1745 and afterwards became Archbishop of Paris; Jean Georges Le Franc de Pompignan (1774–1790), brother of the poet and a great enemy of the "philosophers", and also d'Aviau (1790–1801), illustrious because of his strong opposition to the civil constitution of the clergy and the first of the émigré bishops to re-enter France (May, 1797), returning under an assumed name and at the peril of his life.

Michael Servetus was living in Vienne, whither he had been attracted by Archbishop Pierre Palmier, when Calvin denounced him to the Inquisition for his books. During the proceedings ordered by ecclesiastical authority of Vienne, Servetus fled to Switzerland (1553).

In 1605, the Jesuits founded a college at Vienne, and here Massillon taught at the close of the 17th century. The churches of Saint-Pierre and Saint-André le Haut are ancient Benedictine foundations. The famous council of Vienne was held at Vienne in 1311 (see also Templars).

After the Napoleonic Concordat of 1801, the archepiscopal title of Vienne passed to the see of Lyon, whose Metropolitan was henceforth called "Archbishop of Lyons and Vienne", although Vienne belongs to the Diocese of Grenoble.

== Ordinaries ==
=== Bishops ===
- (Casturus or Castulus - legendary bishop celebrated with a feast day on October 14 since the 13th century [MS CP 601])
- Zacharias (died 106)
- Crescens or Crescentius (c. 160) (this bishop is often identified with Crescens, the supposed disciple of Saint Paul, but without evidence)
- Martin
- Verus
- Justus
- Denis (Dionysius)
- Paracodes (c. 235)
- Paschasius (died 310/12)
- Verus I (c. 314)
- Nectarius (c. 356)
- Florentius I (c. 372)
- Lupicinus
- Simplicius (c. 400–420)
- Jerome (Hieronymus) (c. 421)
- Claudius (c. 440)
- Nicetius (c. 449)
- Florentius II
- Mamertus (died 475/76)
- Hesychius I (c. 475–490)
- Avitus (494–518)
- Julian (c. 520–530)
- Domninus (died 536)
- Pantagathus (c. 538)
- Hesychius II (c. 545–565)
- Namatius (died 559)
- Philip (c. 567–580)
- Evantius (c. 580–586)
- Verus II (586–c.590)
- Desiderius (c. 590–607)
- Domnolus (c. 614–620)
- Etherius
- Clarentius fl. 624
- Sindulf (Syndulph)
- Landalenus (c. 625–650)
- Edictus
- Caldeoldus (654 — 664)
- Bobolinus I (Dodolin)
- Deodatus
- Blidramnus (c. 675–680)
- Agratus (Agroecius) (fl. 691)
- George (c. 699)
- Eoaldus or Edaldus (c. 700–715)
- Bobolinus II (fl. 718)
- Austrebert (719–742)

=== Archbishops ===
- Wilichar (742–752)
- Proculus
- Bertericus (767–790)
- Ursio (c. 790–796)
- Wulfar (797–810)
- Bernard (810–842)
- Agilmar (841–859)
- Ado (859–875)
- Otramnus (878–885)
- Bernoinus (886–899)
- Raginfred (899–907)
- Alexander I (908–926)
- Sobon (927–c. 950)
- Theobald (957–1001)
- Blessed Burchard (c. 1010–c. 1030)
- Léger (1030–1070)
- Armand (1070–1076)
- Warmund (1077–1081)
- Gontard (1082–1084)
- Guido of Burgundy (1088–1119)
- Peter I (1121–1125)
- Stephen I (c. 1125–c. 1145)
- Humbert I (1146–1147)
- Hugo (c. 1148–1153)
- Stephen II (c. 1155–1163)
- Guillaume de Clermont (1163–1166?)
- Robert de La Tour du Pin (c. 1170–1195)
- Aynard de Moirans (1195–c. 1205)
- Humbert II (1206–1215)
- Bournon (1216–1218)
- Jean de Bernin (1218–1266)
- Guy d'Auvergne de Clermont (c. 1268–1278) (House of Auvergne)
- Guillaume de Livron (or de Valence) (1283–c. 1305)
- Briand de Lavieu (Lagnieu) (1306–1317)
- Simon d'Archiac (1319–1320), Cardinal
- Guillaume de Laudun (1321–1327) (then Archbishop of Toulouse)
- Bertrand de La Chapelle (1327–1352)
- Pierre Bertrand (1352–1362)
- Pierre de Gratia (1362–1363) (also Archbishop of Naples)
- Louis de Villars (1363–1377)
- Humbert de Montchal (1377–1395)
- Thibaud de Rougemont 1395–1405 (also Archbishop of Besançon)
- Jean de Nant 1405–1423 (also Bishop of Paris)
- Jean de Norry 1423–1438 (also Archbishop of Besançon)
- Geoffroy Vassal 1440–1444 (then Archbishop of Lyon)
- Jean Gérard de Poitiers 1448–c. 1452 (also Bishop of Valence)
- Jean du Chastel 1452–1453 (also Bishop of Nîmes)
- Antoine de Poisieu (Poisieux) 1453–1473, died 1495
- Guy de Poisieu (Poisieux) 1473–1480
- Astorge Aimery 1480–1482
- Ângelo Catho de Supino 1482–1495
- Antoine de Clermont 1496–1506, died 1509
- Federico di Sanseverino 1506–1515, Cardinal
- Alessandro di Sanseverino 1515–1527
- Scaramuccia Trivulzio March to August 1527
- Pierre Palmier (Paumier) 1528–1554
- Charles de Marillac 1557–1560 (also Bishop of Vannes)
- Jean de La Brosse 1561–1567 oder 1569
- Vespasien Gribaldi 1569–1575
- Pierre de Villars I 1576–1587
- Pierre de Villars II 1587–1598
- Jérôme de Villars 1598–1626
- Pierre de Villars III 1626–1662
- Henri de Villars 1662–1693
- Armand de Montmorin de Saint-Hérem 1694–1713
- François de Bertons de Crillon 1714–1720
- Henri Oswald de La Tour d'Auvergne 1721–1745
- Christophe de Beaumont du Repaire 1745–1746 (also Archbishop of Paris)
- Jean d'Yse de Saléon 1747–1751 (also Bishop of Rodez)
- Guillaume d'Hugues 1751–1774
- Jacques de Condorcet ? 1754–
- Jean Georges Lefranc de Pompignan 1774–1789
- Charles François d'Aviau du Bois-de-Sanzay 1790–1801

== See also ==
- Catholic Church in France
- Council of Vienne
- List of Catholic dioceses in France
- Philippe du Contant de la Molette
- Severus of Vienne

== Bibliography ==
=== Reference Sources ===
- Gams, Pius Bonifatius (1873). Series episcoporum Ecclesiae catholicae: quotquot innotuerunt a beato Petro apostolo. Ratisbon: Typis et Sumptibus Georgii Josephi Manz. pp. 548–549. (Use with caution; obsolete)
- Eubel, Conradus, ed. (1913). Hierarchia catholica, Tomus 1 (second ed.). Münster: Libreria Regensbergiana. p. 301. (in Latin)
- Eubel, Conradus, ed. (1914). Hierarchia catholica, Tomus 2 (second ed.). Münster: Libreria Regensbergiana. p. 175.
- Eubel, Conradus, ed. (1923). Hierarchia catholica, Tomus 3 (second ed.). Münster: Libreria Regensbergiana.
- Gauchat, Patritius (Patrice) (1935). Hierarchia catholica IV (1592-1667). Münster: Libraria Regensbergiana. p. 219.
- Ritzler, Remigius; Sefrin, Pirminus (1952). Hierarchia catholica medii et recentis aevi V (1667-1730). Patavii: Messagero di S. Antonio.

=== Studies ===
- Jean, Armand (1891). Les évêques et les archevêques de France depuis 1682 jusqu'à 1801 (in French). Paris: A. Picard.
- Pisani, Paul (1907). Répertoire biographique de l'épiscopat constitutionnel (1791-1802) (in French). Paris: A. Picard et fils.
- Eubel, Conradus, ed. (1913). Hierarchia catholica, Tomus 1 (second ed.). Munster: Libreria Regensbergiana. p. 527. (in Latin)
- André Pelletier (2001). "Chapitre XII: Vienne chretienne". Vienna, Vienne (in French). Presses Universitaires Lyon. pp. 163–. ISBN 978-2-7297-0677-7.
