= Ado of Vienne =

Frankish churchman and writer

Ado (died 16 December 874) was a Frankish churchman and writer. He served as the archbishop of Vienne from 850 until his death and is venerated as a saint. His writings include hagiography and historiography.

== Life ==
Ado belonged to a prominent noble family. He was sent while still a child for his education, first to Sigulf, abbot of Ferrières, and then to Marcward, abbot of Prüm. After the death of Marcward in 853, Ado went to Rome where he stayed for nearly five years, and then to Ravenna, after which Remy, archbishop of Lyon, gave him the parish of Saint-Romain near Vienne. The following year he was elected archbishop of Vienne and dedicated in August or September 860, despite opposition from Girard, Count of Paris, and his wife Bertha.

Ado participated in the Council of Tousy, near Toul in Lorraine, on 22 October 860, and held a council at Vienne in 870. After his death on 16 December 876, his body was buried in the Church of the Apostles in Vienne, now called St. Peter's Church, the usual place of burial of the archbishops of Vienne. His feast day is celebrated on 16 December.

The Royal Library of Copenhagen preserves an unedited martyrology which dates back to the 11th century and comes from the Abbey of Santa Maria, Serrateix, with information on Ado of Vienne, the Rule of Saint Benedict and other abbots and monks of that time.

== Works ==
Several of his letters are extant and reveal their writer as an energetic man of wide sympathies and considerable influence. Ado's principal works are a martyrology, and a chronicle, Chronicon sive Breviarium chronicorum de sex mundi aetatibus de Adamo usque ad annum 869.

Ado's chronicle is based on that of Bede, with which he combines extracts from the ordinary sources, forming the whole into a consecutive narrative founded on the conception of the unity of the Roman Empire, which he traces in the succession of the emperors, Charlemagne and his heirs following immediately after Constantine VI and Irene. "It is," says Wilhelm Wattenbach, "history from the point of view of authority and preconceived opinion, which exclude any independent judgment of events."

Ado wrote also a book on the miracles of Saint Bernard, archbishop of Vienne (9th century), published in the Bollandist Acta Sanctorum; a life or martyrium of Saint Desiderius, bishop of Vienne (d. 608); and a life of Saint Theuderius of Vienne, otherwise known as Theudericus of the Dauphinê, abbot of Saint-Chef near Vienne (563).
