= Johann Burchard (disambiguation) =

Johann Burchard (c.1450–1506) was an Alsatian-born priest and chronicler

Johann Burchard may also refer to:

- Johann Burchard Freystein (1671–1718), German lawyer and hymn writer
- Johann Heinrich Burchard (1852–1912), Hamburg lawyer and politician

== See also ==
- Johann Burckhardt (disambiguation), several people
