= Animal sanctuary =

Place where animals are free and protected

The Save the Chimps sanctuary

An animal sanctuary is a facility where animals are brought to live and to be protected for the rest of their lives. Some sanctuaries focus on a particular genus, species or geographic region, while others may cater to farmed animals or wildlife more generally.

Unlike zoos, sanctuaries do not breed animals, exhibit them for human entertainment, offer wild animals a chance to interact with visitors, or use animals commercially. Unlike animal shelters, sanctuaries typically do not seek to find new human homes for animals; they provide a safe haven for each animal until their natural death. In some cases, an establishment may have characteristics of both a sanctuary and a shelter, however, assisting in rehoming when needed. Animals are not bought, sold, or traded, nor are they used for testing or experimentation, although sanctuaries may be used to research animal behavior in a non-invasive way. Additionally, no parts of nor secretions from the animals, such as eggs, wool, milk, fur, feathers, fangs, claws, hooves, horns, antlers, or tusks, are commodified. The resident animals are given the opportunity to behave as naturally as possible in a protective environment.

== Overview ==
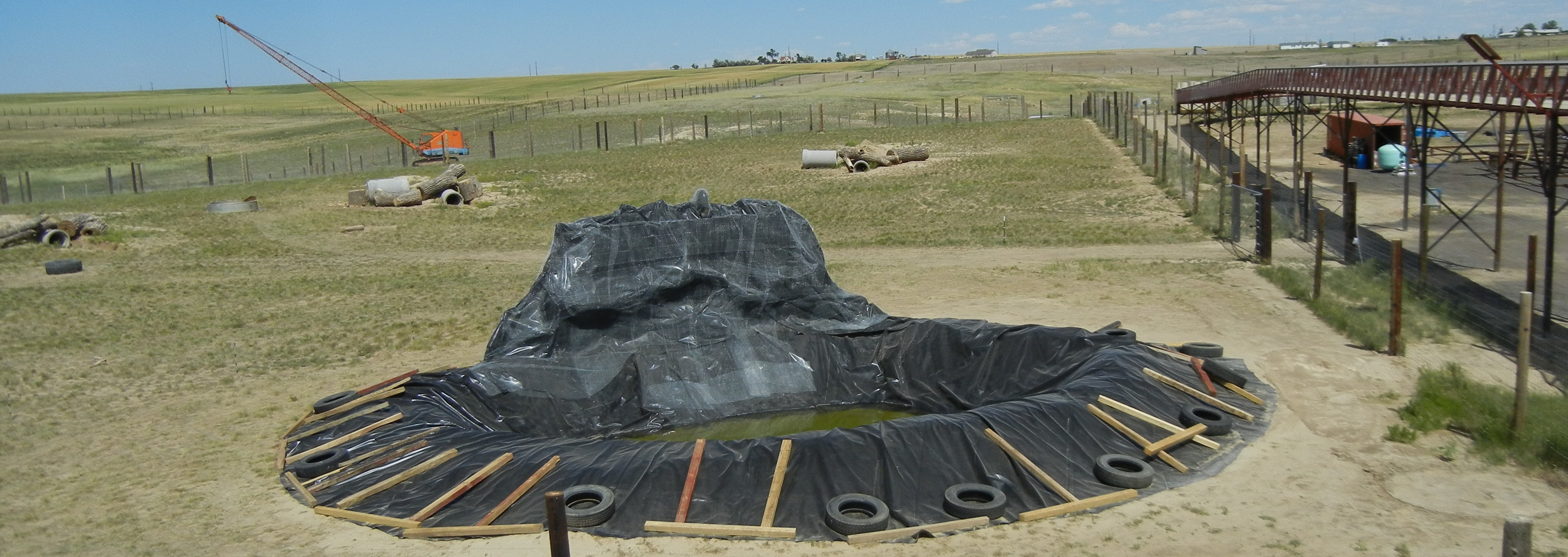
Water feature under construction in 2012 at The Wild Animal Sanctuary

What distinguishes a sanctuary from other institutions is the philosophy that the residents come first. In a sanctuary, every action is scrutinized for any trace of human benefit at the expense of non-human residents. Sanctuaries act on behalf of the animals, and the caregivers work under the notion that all animals in the sanctuary, human and non-human, are of equal importance. Some sanctuaries provide care for multiple species, while others focus on a single species.

A legitimate sanctuary avoids activities that place animals in an unduly stressful situations. Thus, they do not sell daily access to the animals, in the manner of zoos. Most sanctuaries are also not government-funded and are usually nonprofit. Public help is accepted by sanctuaries in the form of volunteering, monetary contributions, donations of food and materials, spreading the word, and in some cases, adoption.

One of the most important missions of sanctuaries, beyond caring for the animals, is educating the public. The ultimate goal of many sanctuaries is to change the way that humans think of, and treat, non-human animals. Some sanctuaries extend their principle of non-violence to include non-resident animals by enforcing vegetarian or vegan policies on staff and visitors.

== Types ==
The coati enclosure at Noah's Ark Animal Sanctuary

There are several types of animal sanctuaries:

1. companion animal sanctuaries
2. wildlife sanctuaries
3. exotic animal sanctuaries
4. farm animal sanctuaries
5. equine sanctuaries
6. cetacean sanctuaries

Some sanctuaries might fall into two or more categories; The Noah's Ark Animal Sanctuary, for example, has a mix of wildlife, exotic animals, and farm animals.

=== Companion animal sanctuaries ===
The Torre Argentina Cat Sanctuary in Rome

A companion animal sanctuary is a large-scale no-kill shelter that offers lifelong care to animal species domesticated for companionship, such as dogs, cats, domestic rabbits, fancy mice, fancy rats, and canaries. Unlike traditional shelters, companion animal sanctuaries often house animals who are feral, have special needs, or are otherwise unlikely to be adopted. Some companion animal sanctuaries care exclusively for feral animals. Sanctuaries that house both ferals and abandoned animals may keep them together if they are the same species, but may keep ferals segregated from other domestic animals if they believe it is in the animals' best interest.

The earliest known companion animal sanctuary was founded in 1984 as the Best Friends Animal Sanctuary in Kanab, Utah. The sanctuary was started with a $5,000 down payment for over 2,000 acres of land in Kanab Canyon by Francis Battista and fellow members of the Process Church of the Final Judgement, who arrived with nearly 200 homeless animals from their former home in Prescott, Arizona.

==== Community-based model ====
The community-based model encourages people to see cats who were born outdoors as traumatized domesticated animals living without safety, care, or protection. Proponents of the community-based model reject the term "feral", instead opting for terms such as "community cats", "outdoor cats", "homeless cats", or "unsocialized cats", believing that a trauma-informed approach could improve the lives of millions of homeless cats and reshape animal welfare policy.

=== Wildlife sanctuaries ===
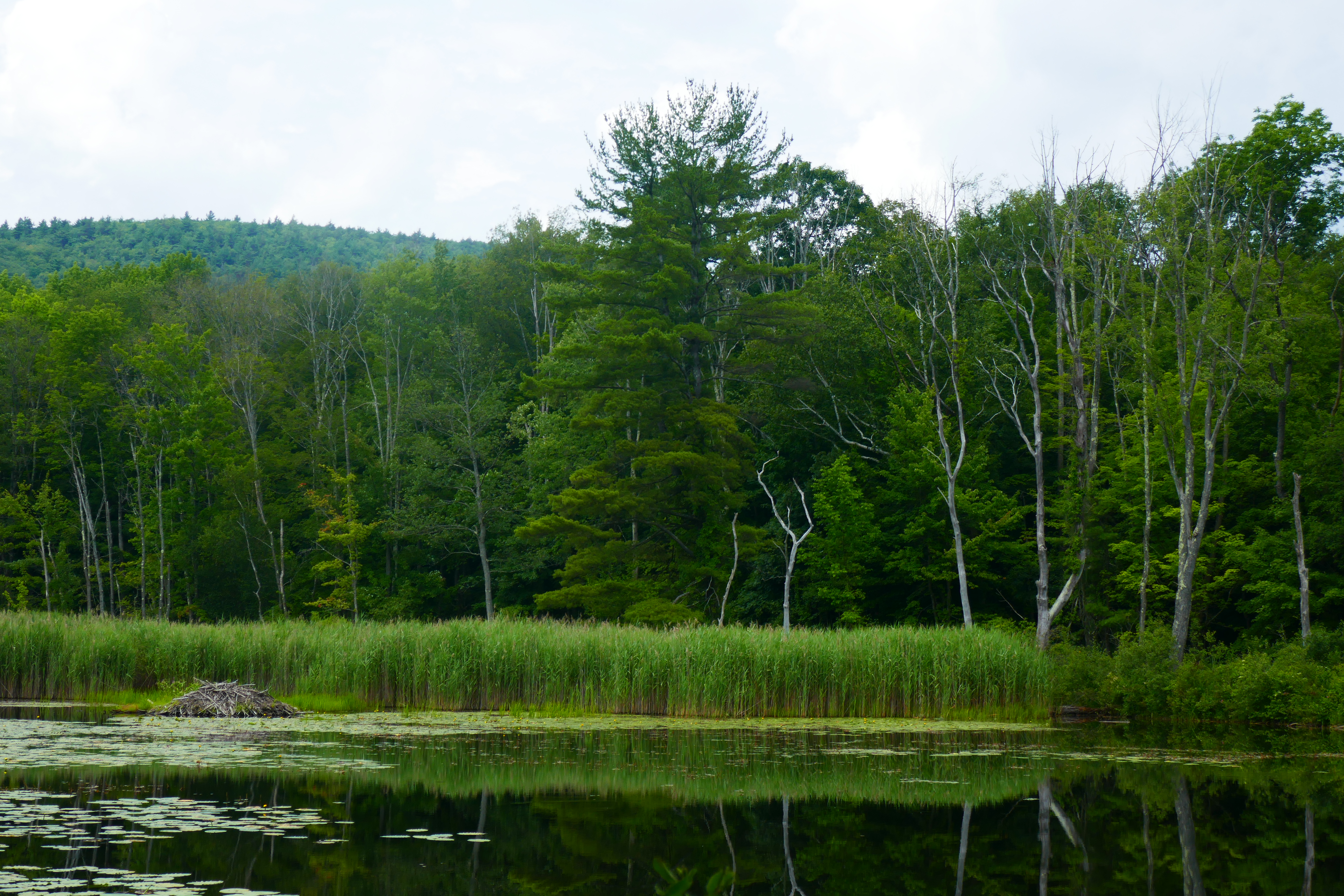
A beaver lodge in a pond at the Pleasant Valley Wildlife Sanctuary in Lenox, Massachusetts

A wildlife sanctuary is a nature reserve that offers protection to native animals who are no longer able to survive in the wild due to being sick, injured, orphaned, or aculturated to human caregivers. Wildlife sanctuaries are in some cases able to return animals to their natural habitats after nursing them back to health. Sanctuaries that care for more than one species may allow interspecies interaction but keep predators segregated from prey.

While cultural practices that roughly equate to the establishment and maintenance of reserved areas for native animals date back to antiquity, the earliest known wildlife sanctuary was founded in 1927 as the Lone Pine Koala Sanctuary in Queensland, Australia as Claude Reid, the founder of the sanctuary, realized that koalas were being culled for their fur and recognized that the species was at risk of extinction. She had named it after a nearby tree, and established it with two pairs of koalas which she named Jack and Jill, and Cutie and Cuddles, respectively. As there were no national or international standards for how a wildlife sanctuary should operate, Lone Pine Koala Sanctuary lacked some chararacteristics of a modern wildlife sanctuary (such as prohibiting direct contact between visitors and wildlife). As of 2024, the sanctuary no longer allows direct contact between visitors and koalas.

=== Equine sanctuaries ===
The Moon Mountain Sanctuary in Queensland, Australia

Equine sanctuaries care for donkeys, horses, mules, and hinnies who have been abused, abandoned, seized by law enforcement, or rescued from slaughter or unnecessary euthanasia.

The earliest known equine sanctuary was founded in 1888 as "Ryerss Infirmary for Dumb Animals" (now known as "Ryerss Farm for Aged Equines)", a sanctuary for retired elderly horses who had been used for transport, moving vehicles, and completing farm chores. The sanctuary was started with $30,000 Ann Waln-Ryerss bequeathed upon her death. The sanctuary has expanded its care to donkeys and mules.

Sanctuaries for feral equines trace their roots to 1978, when Diane Nelson founded The Wild Horse Sanctuary in Shingletown, California after rescuing a group of feral horses who were scheduled for euthanasia following a government roundup and population reduction program and providing them with over 5,000 acres of land.

==== Retirement model ====
The retirement model focuses on providing lifelong care as a humane alternative to euthanizing elderly horses.

==== Conservation model ====
The conservation model focuses on preserving rare bloodlines and maintaining the natural behavior of equine herds. This is achieved through providing feral equines with an environment that mimics the environment they were born in and minimizing human intervention as much as possible. The conservation model avoids of spay-and-neuter, instead opting for temporary, reversible methods of population control such as contraceptives fired from a dart gun.

=== Exotic animal sanctuaries ===
The Monkey Sanctuary in Looe, England

An exotic animal sanctuary provides a safe home for non-native species, including surrendered exotic pets (e.g. snakes, turtles, lizards, tortoises, toads, parrots, parakeets, finches), animals who were rescued from roadside zoos, circuses, the illegal wildlife trade, and unnecessary euthanasia. Unlike zoos, these sanctuaries prioritize animal welfare over public display. Additionally, these sanctuaries educate the public on the harm caused by roadside zoos and the wildlife trade, as well as educating them on the proper care requirements for exotic pets. Sanctuaries are the only facilities that accept hybrids between domestic and wild species, such as wolfdogs and bengal cats. Hybrids between wild species that only occur in roadside zoos, such as ligers and tigons, are also found here, as accredited zoos do not accept them.

The earliest known exotic animal sanctuary was founded in 1979 as The Wild Animal Sanctuary. Pat Craig, the founder of the sanctuary, had visited a friend who working as a zoo groundskeeper in North Carolina and learned that surplus tigers and lions who wouldn't fit in the exhibits were kept in small cages at the back of the zoo where they couldn't be seen by visitors. When Craig returned to Colorado, he called the Denver Zoo to see if they could care for them, but was told that they too had a surplus of tigers. He called the state and federal government to report the incident, which he learned wasn't a violation of the law. After building cages and obtaining the right certifications, Craig was approved to legally house exotic animals on his family’s 15-acre farm east of Boulder.

=== Farm animal sanctuaries ===
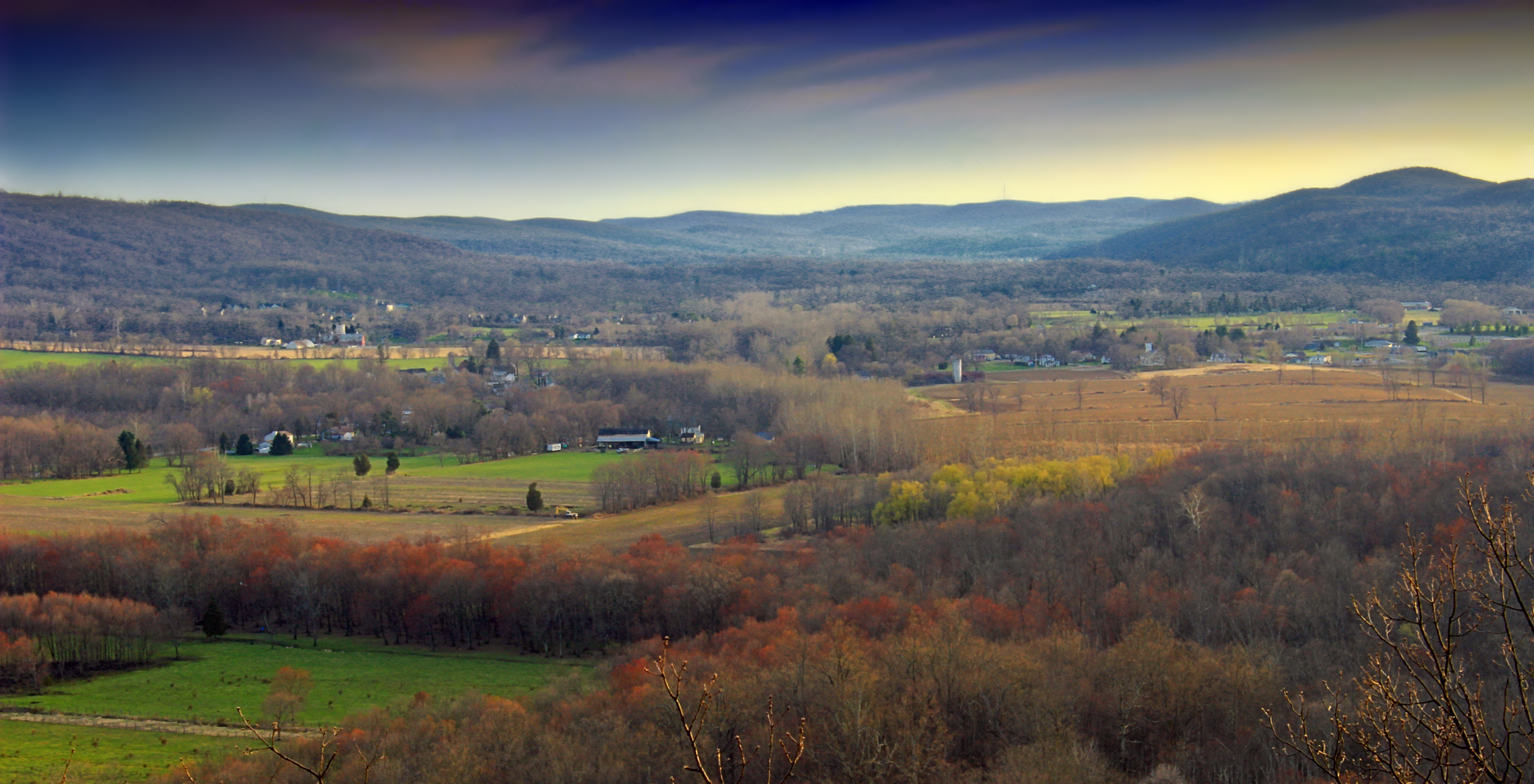
The Old Farm Sanctuary in New Jersey

Farm animal sanctuaries (FAS) provide care, shelter and advocacy of animal species domesticated for food and clothing, such as chickens, cows, goats, pigs, ducks, geese, and sheep.Another term is "farmed animal sanctuary", which refers to a vegan farm sanctuary that only rescues animals from commercial settings, and may take in wild animals who are legally classified as "livestock" in addition to traditional farm animals. The farm sanctuary layout tends to resemble traditional farms, however, functions differently.

FAS as a movement began with Gene Baur, the co-founder of Farm Sanctuary, the first official farm sanctuary that opened in 1986. The daily tasks of a FAS involve the primary guardians, volunteers and at time visitors. Livestock guardian dogs may also be trained to protect residents from predators. Each day is structured by routines such as feeding, care and health procedures, as well as cleaning and maintenance.

Points of conflict for sanctuaries include human intervention in matters of sterilizing animals and species segregation. Effective altruists have critiqued FAS's ability to reduce animal suffering as demonstrated in the "arithmetic of compassion", a utilitarian measure of advocacy that applies mathematical formulas to reduce suffering in light of individual lives. Jon Bockman of Animal Charity Evaluators, states, "expending too many resources on direct rescue results in less money directed toward education and a lower overall impact in helping animals, and all advocates should give consideration to this concern when deciding how best to help animals".

Many sanctuaries struggle due to lack of capacity and the large numbers for animals abandoned by humans who purchased them as companions.

==== FAS models ====
Sue Donaldson and Will Kymlicka have outlined two different types of FAS models. FAS can be distinguished by ascribing to either refuge and advocacy model or intentional community model.

==== Refuge- and advocacy-based models ====
Refuge- and advocacy-based models are the most standard. These sanctuaries are found in traditional agricultural communities in part because of the physical and legal infrastructure. Six characteristics of this model include: duty of care, support for species-typical flourishing, recognition of individuality, non-exploitation, non-perpetuation, and awareness and advocacy. The latter characteristic has launched a series of questions into the effectiveness of the educational component of sanctuaries.

==== Intentional community model ====
The intentional community model addresses the shortcomings of the standard sanctuary model by focusing on movement building that includes a spectrum of speciesist issues such as developing farm animal veterinary care that exist outside of standard practices that have aimed at meeting animal agricultural interests. The six characteristics of the intentional community model include: belonging, absence of fixed hierarchical relationships, self-determination, citizenship, dependent agency, and scaffolded choices and reconfigured spaces. These characteristics redress some of the critiques of the refuge and advocacy model by grounding sanctuary practices in animal agency and expanding the geographical boundaries of where animals can live. Expanding the geographies in which farmed animals are found serve as a corrective to forming human-farmed animal friendships.

An example of the intentional sanctuary model can be found in the Microsanctuary Movement started by Rosemary and Justin Van Kleeck. The Microsanctuary Movement encourages city-dwellers to rescue farmed animals to expand what species are considered to be companion animals.

Similarly, Darren Chang, co-founder of the Riverdale Farm Sanctuary Project has launched a campaign to transform Riverdale Farms, an urban farm in Toronto into a FAS advocating for: 1) Animal Rescue, Refuge, and Advocacy, 2) Compassion and Nonviolence, 3) Ecological and Food Justice and Compassionate Interspecies Community.

Expanding beyond the traditional role of a safe haven for farmed animals, sanctuaries can also be understood as playing political roles in transforming the political and spatial lives of animal residents and their broader species communities leaning into pioneering a less-speciesist future.

=== Cetacean sanctuaries ===
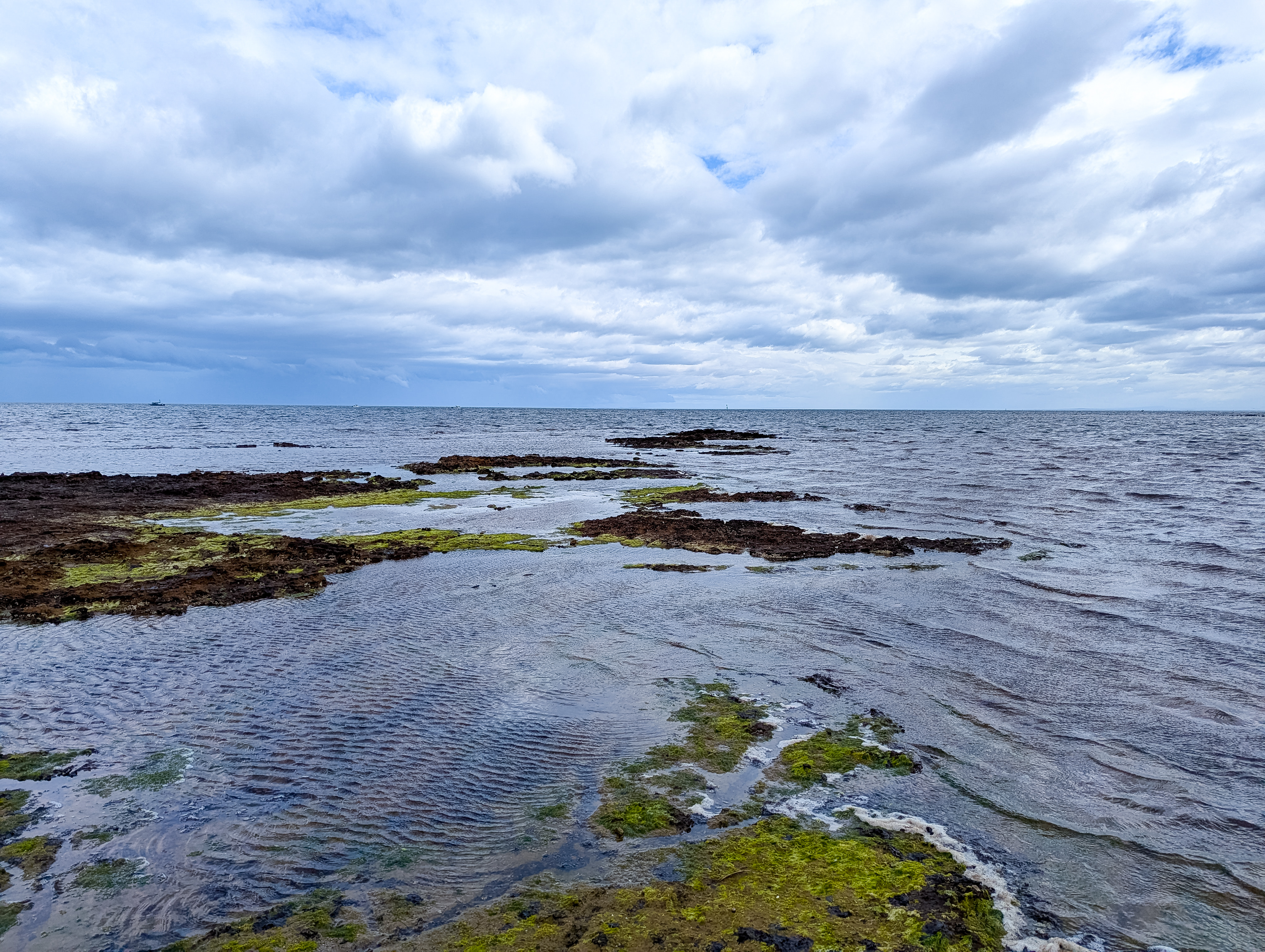
The Ricketts Point Marine Sanctuary in Parks Victoria

Cetacean sanctuaries, or marine life sanctuaries, are designed for autonomy and well-being, enabling as natural a life as possible in ocean water. Lifetime of care is provided for these whales, dolphins, or porpoises. Like other wild animals who have spent much or all of their lives in zoos, cetaceans who have lived in marine parks for most or all of their lives are potentially poor candidates for reintroduction and, therefore, sanctuaries are an alternative to living on display or in entertainment facilities. Sanctuary site selection, as far as size, water quality, protection from hazards and weather events, and more, introduce unique considerations for finding a location.

The need for cetacean sanctuaries is quickly emerging due to shifting regulations and changes in public attitudes toward cetaceans in captivity. With an estimated 3,600 cetaceans in captivity globally, the need for spacious natural ocean environments that provide feeding and care is increasing, as globally marine parks and aquariums move away from whales and dolphins in their facilities. A primary criticism of commercial facilities is that animals are expected to perform unnatural behaviors for audiences in spaces that are small and cannot adequately approximate a natural setting.

The first cetacean sanctuary for belugas opened in August 2020 by SEA LIFE Trust, as two belugas "Little Grey" and "Little White" were transported 6,000 miles from an aquarium in China to the first open-water whale sanctuary for belugas in Iceland. The Whale Sanctuary Project is creating a coastal sanctuary for beluga whales and orcas in Port Hilford, Nova Scotia and plans to welcome their first residents in late 2023, assuming the project gets the required federal and provincial permits. The National Aquarium in Baltimore, Maryland, is seeking a Caribbean location to create a warm water seaside dolphin sanctuary to become the permanent home for the dolphins currently at their facility. And the Archipelagos Institute of Marine Conservation is planning to create the Aegean Marine Life Sanctuary for previously captive dolphins on the island of Lipsi, south of Samos in the eastern Aegean Sea.

Like other animal sanctuaries, cetacean sanctuaries adhere to a set of principles that put the animals first above the needs of the public, researchers, donors or other stakeholders. In cetacean sanctuaries, each animal's physical and mental well-being is the priority and the mission is to provide an environment where the cetacean residents can thrive.

== Services provided ==
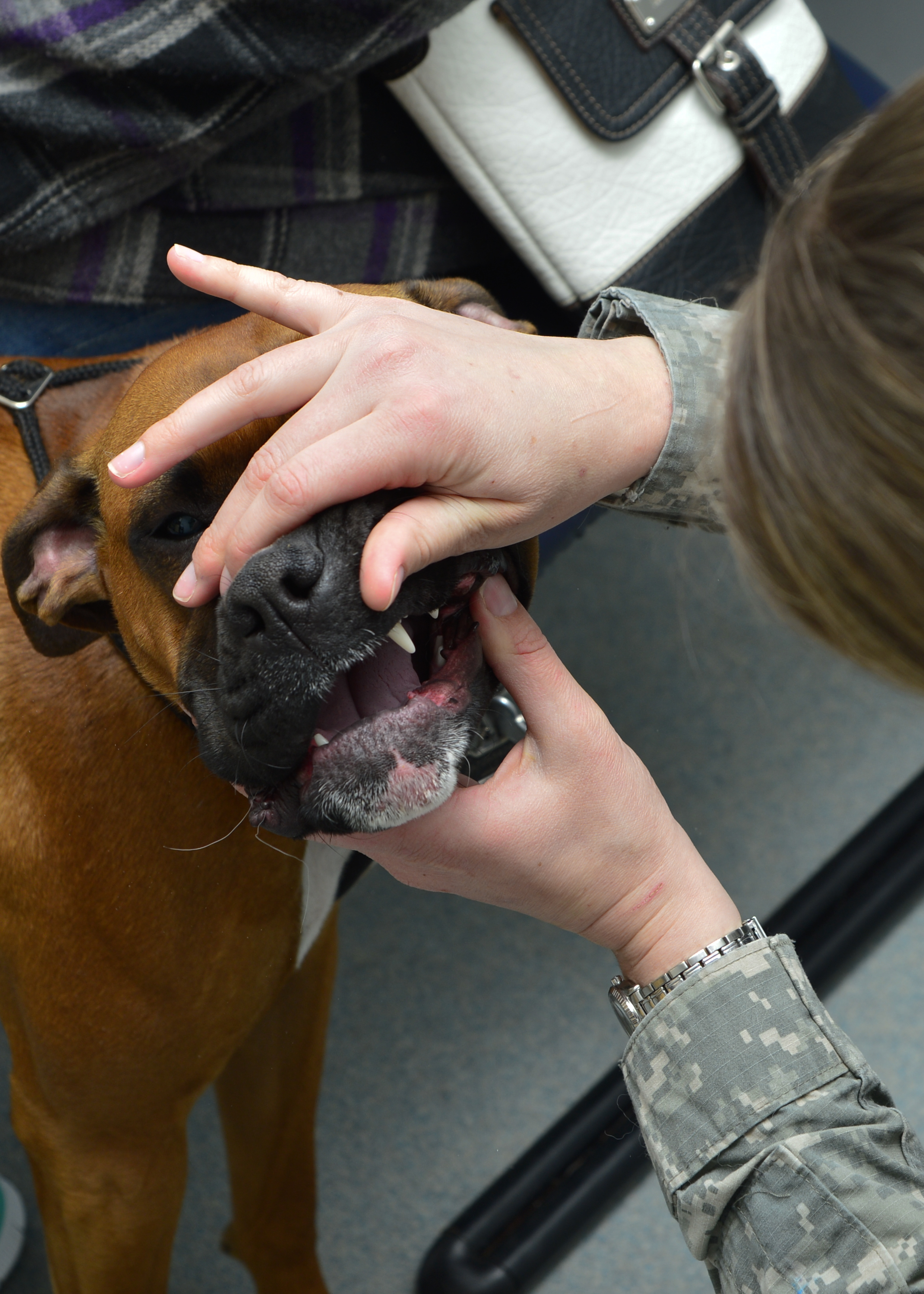
A veterinarian examines her patient's teeth to check hygiene status.

Animal sanctuary services include spaying and neutering, hygiene, and physical well-being. These services are mainly performed by licensed veterinarians. Other positions that can be held by people at sanctuaries include specialized animal trainers, groomers, and volunteers. When it comes to new residents, they are typically not used to living with a large population of their kind and can be easily overwhelmed or agitated. Because of this, they can be held for a certain amount of time before being admitted to the general public. In this time, veterinarians study the new animal's behavioral and dietary habits and try for a smooth transition into the sanctuary's environment. Also, some species of animals, dogs for example, are social creatures. In isolation they get lonely and become depressed. Animal sanctuaries often accommodate these types of animals by putting them in living quarters where they're in groups or pairs that they fit well with. Enrichment activities are also available for the residents.

== Accreditation ==
The primary US-based organization that provides accreditation and support for animal sanctuaries is the Global Federation of Animal Sanctuaries. An earlier organization, American Sanctuary Association, ceased operations. In the United States, sanctuaries must also be licensed by the United States Department of Agriculture (USDA) and regularly inspected by the Animal and Plant Health Inspection Service (APHIS) for compliance with the Animal Welfare Act..

== See also ==
- List of animal sanctuaries
- Nature park
- Nature reserve
- Wildlife sanctuary
- Biosphere reserve
- SaveAFox Rescue
