= Florentius of Strasbourg =

Bishop of Strasbourg

Saint Florentius of Strasbourg was the 13th Bishop of Strasbourg 678-693 or +660. His feast day is celebrated 3 April or 7 November (810, Niederhaslach).

== See also ==
- Catholic Church in France
- Collegiate church Saint Florentius
