= Johann Burchard =

German priest

Johann Burchard, also spelled Johannes Burchart or Burkhart (c.1450–1506) was an Alsatian-born priest and chronicler during the Italian Renaissance. He spent his entire career at the papal courts of Sixtus IV, Innocent VIII, Alexander VI, Pius III, and Julius II, serving as papal Master of Ceremonies, a position from which he was able to observe most of the important events of the period.

== Early life ==
As his surname suggests Burkhardt was a German born at Niederhaslach in Alsace, (today the Bas-Rhin in France). Of humble origins, he was educated by the collegial chapter of St. Florent in Niederhaslach. He took the degree Doctor of Canon Law (Decretorum Doctor, as he proclaims in his preface to his Ordo Missae), and then, on 4 June 1477, was able to purchase the bourgeois citizenship of Strasbourg. He eventually became secretary to Jean Wegeraufft, the Vicar General of the Bishop of Strasbourg, Ruppert von Simmern. Suspected of trafficking in dispensations from publishing marriage banns, theft of a sword and of a florin, he left his position with the Vicar about 1467. He went to Rome, where he was awarded the expectation of a benefice in Strasbourg, but it was contested in Strasbourg; Burchard won his case before the Roman Rota (court of appeal), but the authorities in Strasbourg refused to recognize the ruling, citing Burchard's previous misdeeds. In Rome, Burchard twice admitted his misdeeds to the authorities, but his standing seems not to have suffered. Burchard was ordained a priest in 1476.

== Roman career ==
Burchard arrived in Rome in November 1481. He first practiced as a lawyer in the Roman Curia. He became a Protonotary Apostolic in February 1481/82, and was appointed Master of Ceremonies to Pope Sixtus IV on 29 November 1483, having bought the office for 450 ducats, with the assistance of Agostino Patrizi, whose colleague he became. He held it until his death on 16 May 1506, successively acting as Ceremoniere to Innocent VIII (1484–1492), Alexander VI (1492–1503), Pius III (1503) and during the early years of Julius II.

On the day of his election, 29 August 1484, Pope Innocent was conducted to his new apartments in the Vatican Palace by the Master of Ceremonies. Burchard took the opportunity, a completely appropriate one, to ask the new Pope for the office of Papal Chamberlain. The Pope replied that he would think about it. Burchard did not pursue the matter, and nothing was done.

In 1490 Burchard was given a leave of absence to return to Strasbourg by Pope Innocent VIII, to begin on 29 June. His diary does not resume until 8 August 1491.

In Rome, Burchard joined the Confraternity of Santa Maria dell'Anima and quickly rose to become its provost. It was while he held the office of Praefectus fabricae that the decision was taken to rebuild the church of Santa Maria dell'Anima as part of the celebration of the Jubilee of 1500. The cornerstone was laid by Matthias Lang, the German ambassador and future cardinal, on 11 April 1500. The church was built in the style of a Hallenkirche that was typical for Northern Europe. Andrea Sansovino was retained as architect by the confraternity. The facade was completed by Giuliano da Sangallo.

Burchard accumulated an array of ecclesiastical benefices in Alsace, including that of the Provost of St. Marien (Basel) (in German) (1475), and Provost of Strasbourg. He was a Canon of the Collegiate Church of S. Thomas in Strasbourg, by papal provision, granted on 31 October 1479. He was also Provost of Basel (1484), and then Dean of Basel (1501).

Among the significant events organised by Burchard as Ceremoniere were: the visit of Don Federigo de Aragon to Rome (December 1493 to January 1494); the coronation of Alfonso II of Naples (May 1494); the reception of Charles VIII of France in Rome (November 1494 to February 1495); the Papal Embassy to the Emperor Maximilian in Milan (July–November 1496); the Proclamation of the Jubilee (Christmas 1499); the visit of Alexander VI to Piombino (January–March 1502); and obsequies of Pope Alexander VI (August 1503). Burchard was also present at the laying of the foundation stone of the new Basilica of St. Peter on 18 April 1506.

Burchard was promoted Bishop of the diocese of Orte and Cività Castellana on 3 October 1503 by Pope Pius III, in acknowledgment of more than twenty years of service as First Master of Ceremonies. He had been promised the bishopric of Nepi and Sutri, as Pius was reminded by Cardinal Ascanio Sforza, but the new pope had already promised that diocese to Antonio de' Alberici. Orte was therefore substituted. Burchard retired in May 1504. Burchard's successor, Paris de Grassis, had already been nominated by the time of the conclave of 1503, in anticipation of Burchard's retirement. In June 1504 Burchard paid a brief visit to his new diocese, and returned again from 4 July until mid-August. He was back in Rome on 15 August for the commemoration of Pope Alexander VI, and then returned again to his diocese, until 8 October 1504.

In 1505 Burchard suffered an attack of "goutte", which kept him confined to his room. Thuasne notices that from this point the entries in his diary are less regular and without the usual historical detail as earlier.

On 21 April 1506, Pope Julius II signed the document appointing Burchard to the office of Abbreviator de Parco Majore in the Papal Curia, for which Burchard had paid 2,400 ducats.

Burchard died on Saturday evening, 16 May 1506. He was buried in the church of Santa Maria del Popolo at the Flaminian Gate.

== Historical importance ==
Burchard's importance derives from his Liber Notarum, a form of official record of the more significant papal ceremonies with which he was involved. The first volume of the first critical edition of this work was published by E. Celani in 1906 as Johannis Burckardi Liber Notarum ab anno MCCCCLXXXIII usque ad annum MDVI. A second volume followed (1911). Celani's edition collated various earlier printed editions of the work, and a collection of uncertain notations, with Burchard's original manuscript, thereby establishing an edition of this account of the papal court at the end of the fifteenth century.

As Ceremoniere, he was responsible for the publication of a revised edition of the Liber Pontificalis in 1485, and, along with Agostino Patrizi, for the publication of a new edition of the Caeremoniale Episcoporum in 1488. Perhaps Burchard's most enduring publication was the Ordo Servandus per Sacerdotem in celebratione Missae, published under orders from Pope Alexander VI. This book went through numerous editions before its substance eventually made its way into the Normae Generales of the Roman Missal.

His diary records an alleged orgy known as the Banquet of Chestnuts, held by Cesare Borgia in the Papal Palace on 30 October 1501. Mandell Creighton accepts the story as basically true, and he cites the corroborative evidence of a dispatch of the Florentine Ambassador, Francesco Pepi. Maria Bellonci also seems to accept the story. However, Picotti believes the diary should be regarded with some caution regarding entries concerning the Borgias, since it is fairly apparent that Burchard disliked the Borgias.

Burchard's immediate successor as First Master of Ceremonies, Paris de Grassis, left a frank comment on Burchard's character at the beginning of his private ceremonial Diary:

Granted however new and untried I may be, like an ass at the lyre, I shall try to do my duty satisfactorily through frequent efforts and entries year by year. And so I ask that at this beginning as I am recording and explaining the actions of so many prelates, ill-wishing detractors not laugh at my writings, especially my colleague Johannes Burchard, who is much more of an associate in my office than my friend in charity, of which there is none in him. For when he realized that I aspired to his job, from that point he tried everything against me that he had the power and the knowledge to do, and more, and strove to get me dismissed.

The Liber Notarum is still maintained by the papal Ceremoniere.

Though he only described musical details when in the context of innovations or mishaps, his account is an important source for details of papal choir singing. Among other details, he noted the use of polyphony in settings of the Passion, a practice apparently introduced from Spain, and the performance of the now-lost motet Gaude Roma vetus, written in honor of Pope Alexander VI to a text by Johannes Tinctoris.

Burchard's residence, built in 1491, survives and can be seen at Via del Sudario 44, in Rome. Burchard was also known as "Argentinus" from the Latin name for Strasbourg, and the tower on his palace gave the name "Torre Argentina" to the district, still retained in the Largo di Torre Argentina and other names.

== In popular culture ==
Johann Burchard was portrayed by Ralph Nossek in the 1981 BBC-RAI production TV series The Borgias, by Simon McBurney in the 2011 Showtime series The Borgias, by Victor Schefé in the 2011 French-German series Borgia, and by Shawn Shillingford in the 2018 CNN series Pope: The Most Powerful Man in History.

== Bibliography ==
- Tobias Daniels, Der päpstliche Zeremonienmeister Johannes Burckard, Jakob Wimpfeling und das Pasquill im deutschen Humanismus, in 'Deutsches Archiv für die Erforschung des Mittelalters' 69,1 (2013), pp. 127–140.
- E. Celani, Rerum Italiarum Scriptores, Vol. XXXII, parte 1a, I, Città di Castello 1907-1913.
- Burchard, Joannes (1883). Louis Thuasne (ed.). Diarum sine rerum urbanarum commentarii (in French and Latin). Vol. Tome premier (1483-1492). Paris: Ernest Leroux.
- Burchard, Joannes (1884). Louis Thuasne (ed.). Diarum sine rerum urbanarum commentarii (in Latin). Vol. Tome second (1492-1499). Paris: E. Leroux.
- Burchard, Joannes (1885). Louis Thuasne (ed.). Diarum sine rerum urbanarum commentarii (in Latin). Vol. Tome troisième (1500-1506). Paris: E. Leroux. [Thuasne's biography of Burchard at pp. i-xlvii].
- Gulik, Guilelmus (1923). Eubel, Conradus (ed.). Hierarchia catholica, Tomus 3 (second ed.). Münster: Libreria Regensbergiana.
- D. Gnoli, La Torre Argentina in Nuova Archeologia, 43 (1908, III), pp. 596–605.
- J. Lesellier, Les méfaits du cérémonier Jean Burckard in Mélanges d'archeologie et d'histoire, 44 (1927), pp. 11–34.
- L. Oliger, Der päpstliche Zeremonienmeister Johannes Burckard von Straßburg, in Archiv für elsäβiche Kirchengeschichte, 9 (1934), pp. 199–232.
