= Noah's Ark Animal Sanctuary =

Animal rescue centre

- Founded: 1990
- Founders: Jama Hedgecoth
- Tax ID no.: 58-1909303
- Purpose: Animal rescue, Wildlife rehabilitation
- Location: Locust Grove, Georgia, United States
- Coordinates: 33°18′22″N 84°07′39″W
- Revenue: $1,201,891 (2024)
- Website: noahs-ark.org

Noah's Ark Animal Sanctuary is a 501(c)(3) nonprofit American domestic, wildlife, and exotic animal rescue and rehabilitation center. It is located on 121 acres in Locust Grove, Georgia and houses over 170 animals. Many of the center's animals were rescued from unlicensed owners, donated by circuses and zoos, or surrendered by individuals who were either unable to provide the proper care or did not want them.

== History ==
Founded by Jama and Charles Hedgecoth in 1978, the center was originally located on a small farm in Ellenwood. In 1990, Noah's Ark moved to a 122-acre property in Locust Grove, Georgia in part through the financial help of an anonymous benefactor. In 1992, they expanded the center to include the Noah's Ark Children Care Home for foster children. This portion of Noah's Ark is no longer in operation.

== Animals ==
In total, Noah's Ark is home to 38 animal enclosures, each of which house a variety of animals that accumulate to over 100 different species. Inhabitants include animals such as Bengal tigers, American black bears, porcupines, Sulcata tortoises, silver foxes.

A majority of the enclosures are located to the east of the sanctuary entrance and are easily walkable along the paved trails. While visiting Noah's Ark, the experience is typically self-guided so visitors can explore at their own pace, but guided tours are available as well. Most of the animal enclosures are marked with name tags and contain information pertaining to that specific animal.

== BLT ==
In 2001, the center acquired a trio of captive young animals (a bear cub, a lion cub, and a tiger cub) after they were confiscated from a convicted drug dealer during a raid at an Atlanta home. The three cubs were brought to Noah's Ark by the Georgia Department of Natural Resources with many health problems. When the animals were separated for treatment, the caretakers noticed a change in their behavior. The bonded cubs, collectively known as BLT (Bear-Lion-Tiger), had been housed together in a special exhibit called "The Clubhouse" following their recovery.

=== Baloo ===
Baloo was a male American black bear weighing in over 800 pounds (363 kilograms). Upon his arrival to Noah's ark, Baloo had to undergo surgery to remove the harness that he had long outgrown. The harness had become so severely ingrown to the extent that his growing body began to form around it, causing much pain.

Baloo enjoyed being in the creek that runs along his enclosure or relaxing on the porch connected to the clubhouse. He also enjoyed the occasional Tootsie Pop or Oreo as those are his favorite treats.

The last surviving BLT member, Baloo died May 6, 2025. His remains were returned to Noah's Ark, where he will be reunited with the other members of the BLT trio in a memorial at the sanctuary.

=== Leo ===
Leo was a male African lion that weighed in at 430 pounds (195 kilograms). Leo also suffered physically from their treatment prior to arriving at Noah's Ark. He was kept in a cage too small to accommodate his growing frame and as a result, he sustained an abrasion to the nose, leaving behind a slight scar in his later years.

In late summer of 2016, caretakers noticed a change in Leo's behavior. During surgery some time later, it was found that Leo's liver had become compromised with a large amount of inoperable tumors. As a result of this discovery on August 11, Leo was put to sleep at the age of fifteen. He was laid to rest in the trio's enclosure where a statue stands in his memory.

=== Shere Khan ===
Shere Khan was a male Bengal tiger that weighed in at 360 pounds (163 kilograms). Like his brothers, Shere Khan arrived at Noah's Ark extremely malnourished and in need of specialized care. He healed quickly and soon grew into his role as the trio's most playful and mischievous sibling.

In late 2018, Shere Khan fell ill and in early December it was reported that he was in critical condition. On December 18, he died at 17 and a half years of age as a result of failing body functions. Shere Khan was laid to rest next to his brother, Leo.

== Facilities ==
The sanctuary contains a welcome center, a gift shop, a playground, a picnic area, and a memorial garden.

== Gallery ==
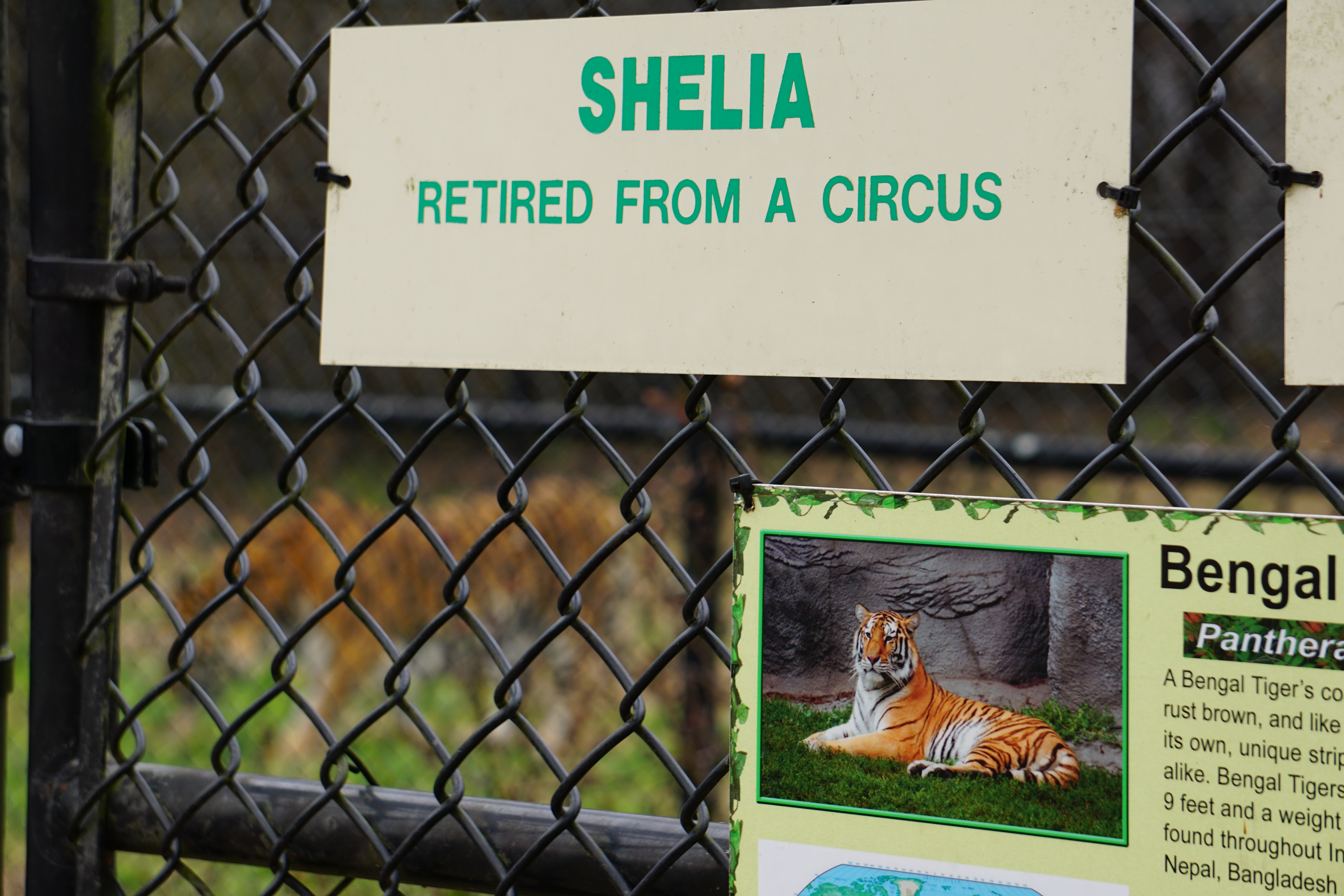
Bengal tiger

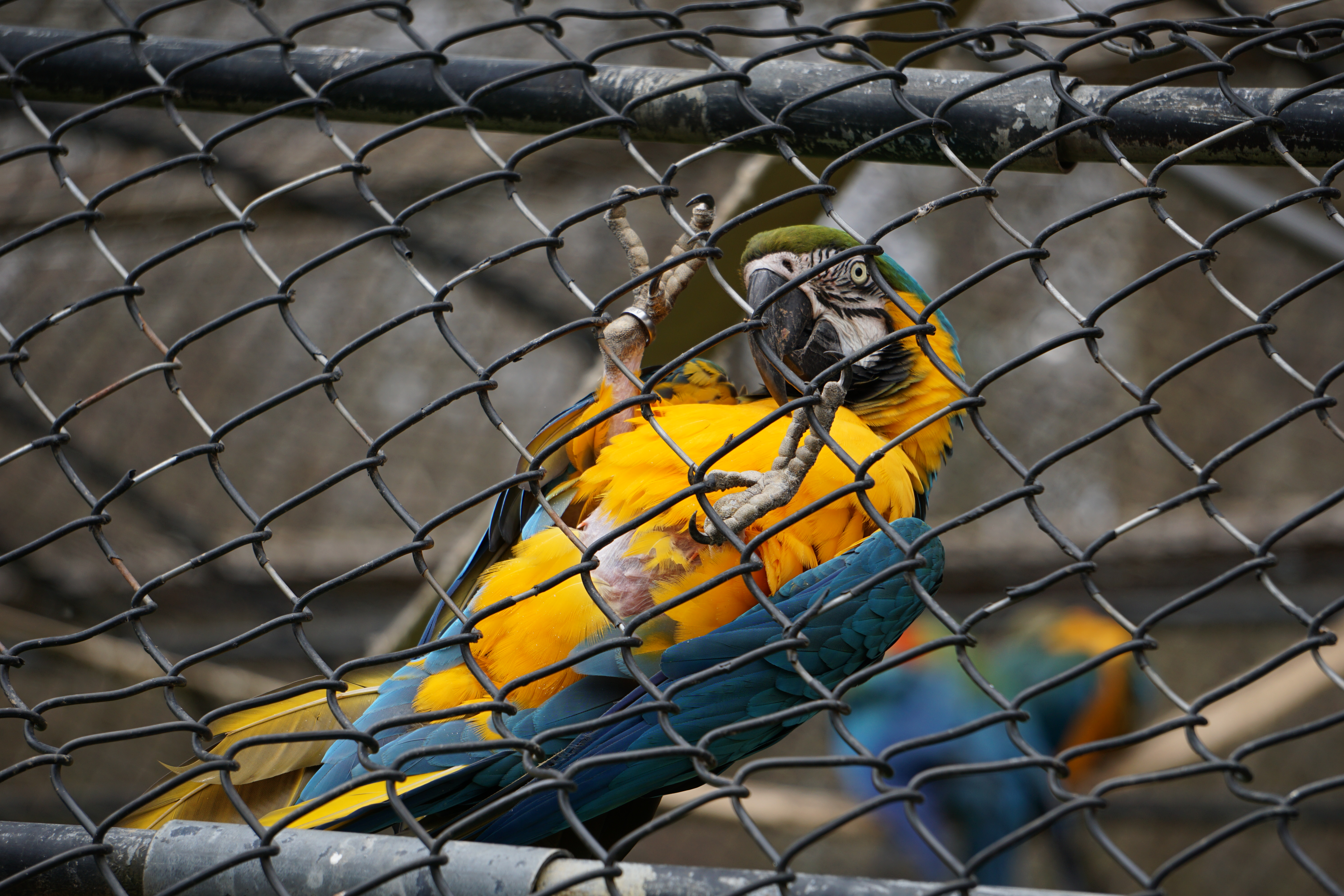
blue-and-gold macaw

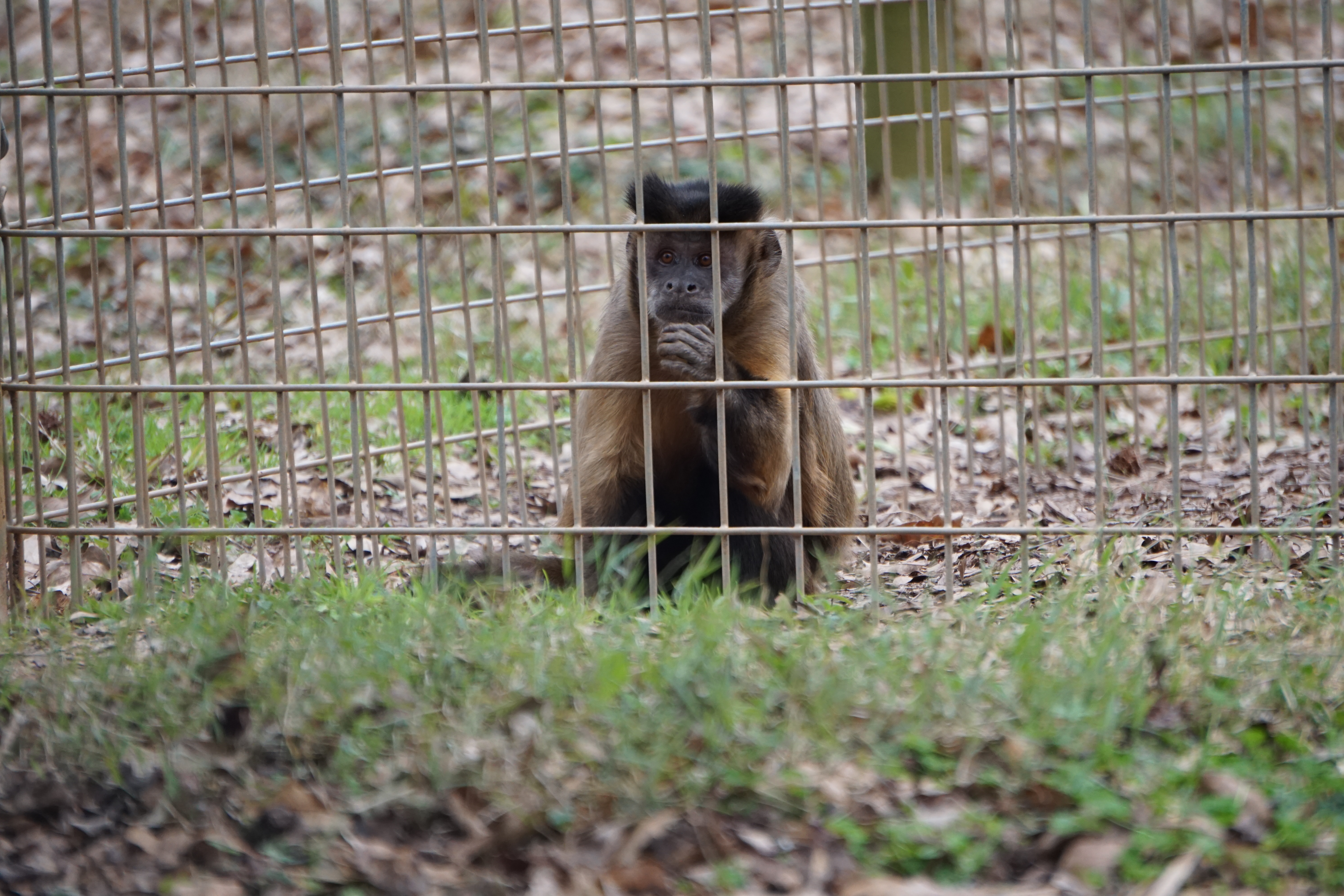
capuchin monkey

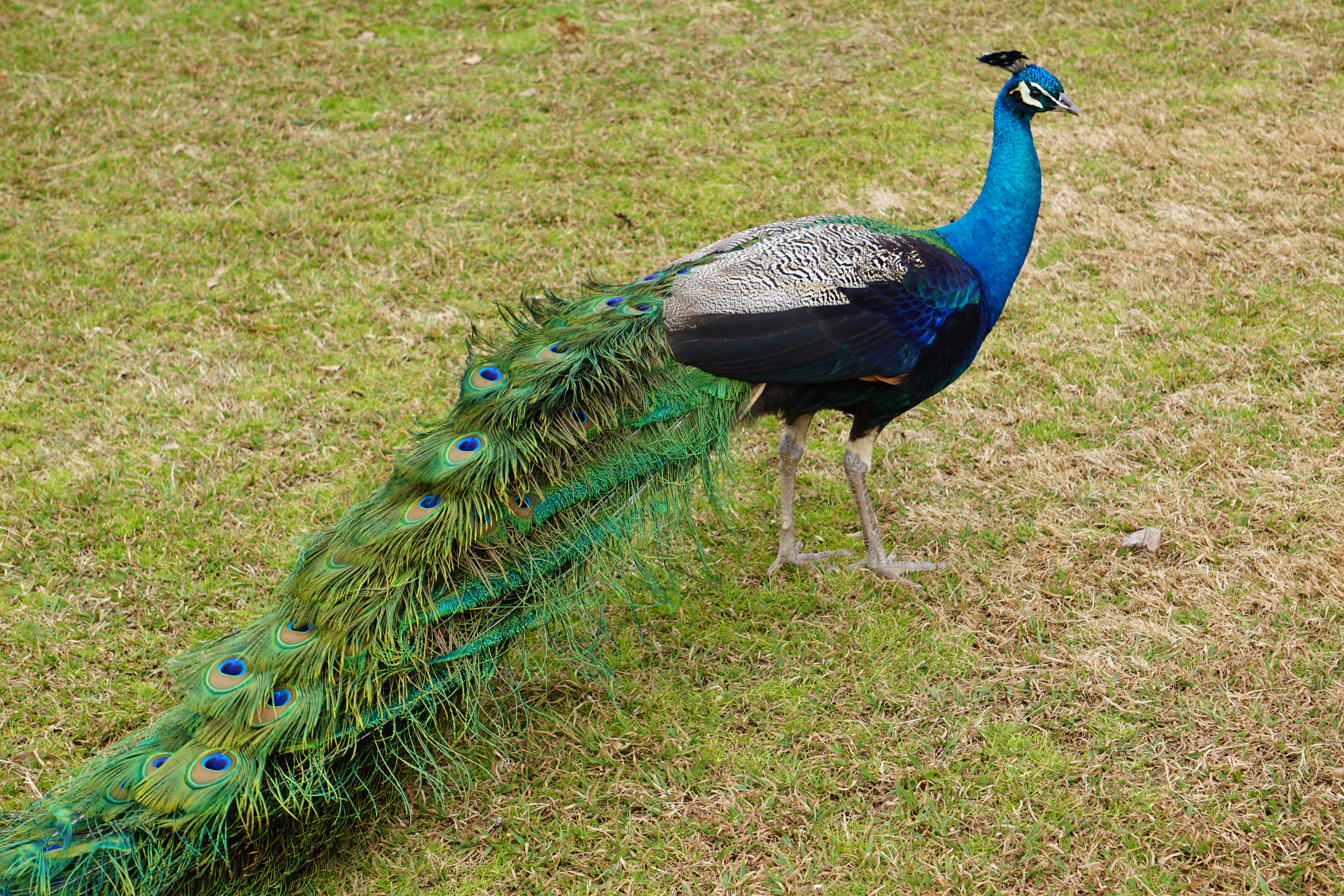
peacock

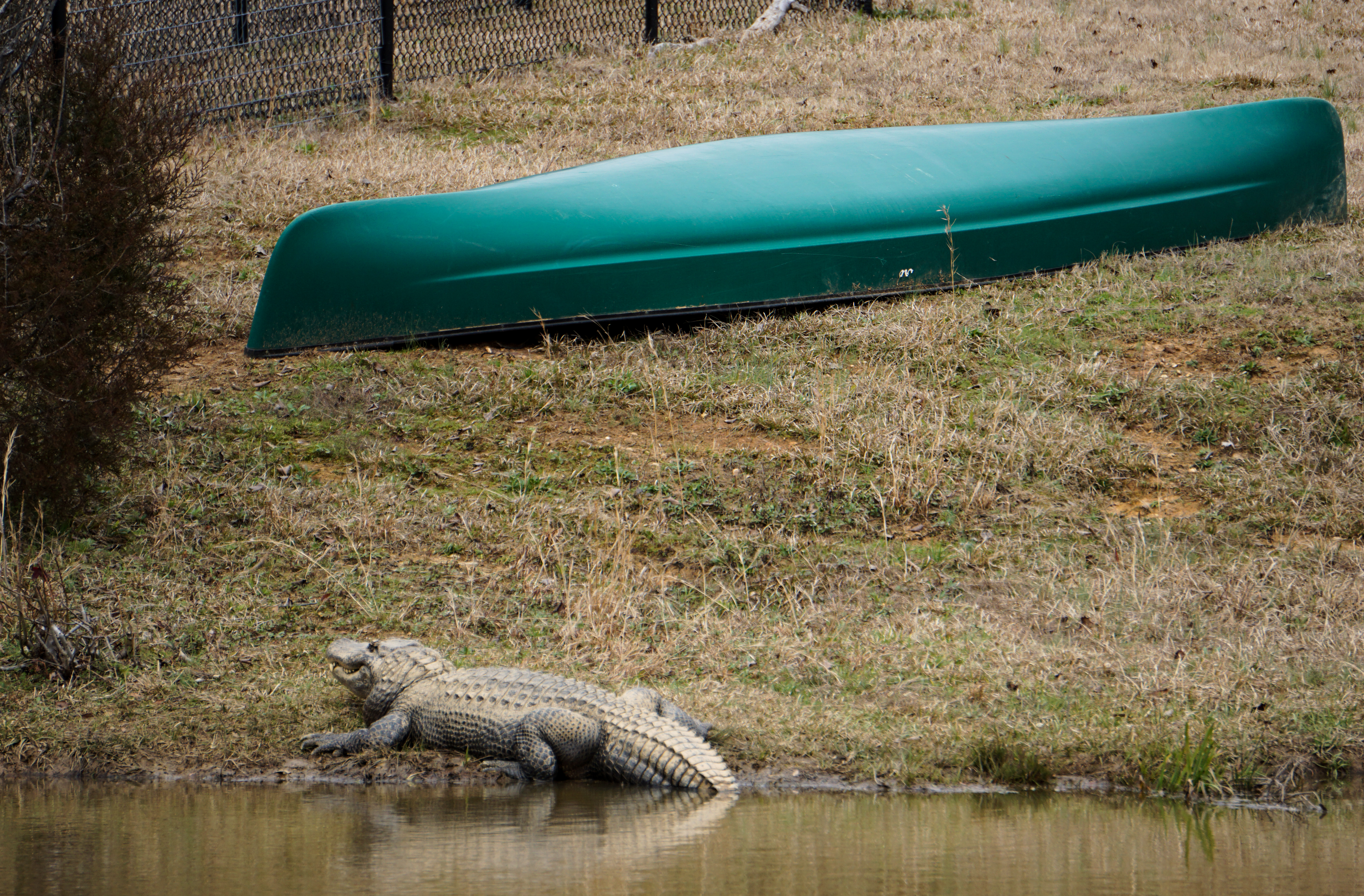
American alligator
