= Largo di Torre Argentina =

Ancient religious monument in Rome, Italy

Area Sacra di Largo Argentina
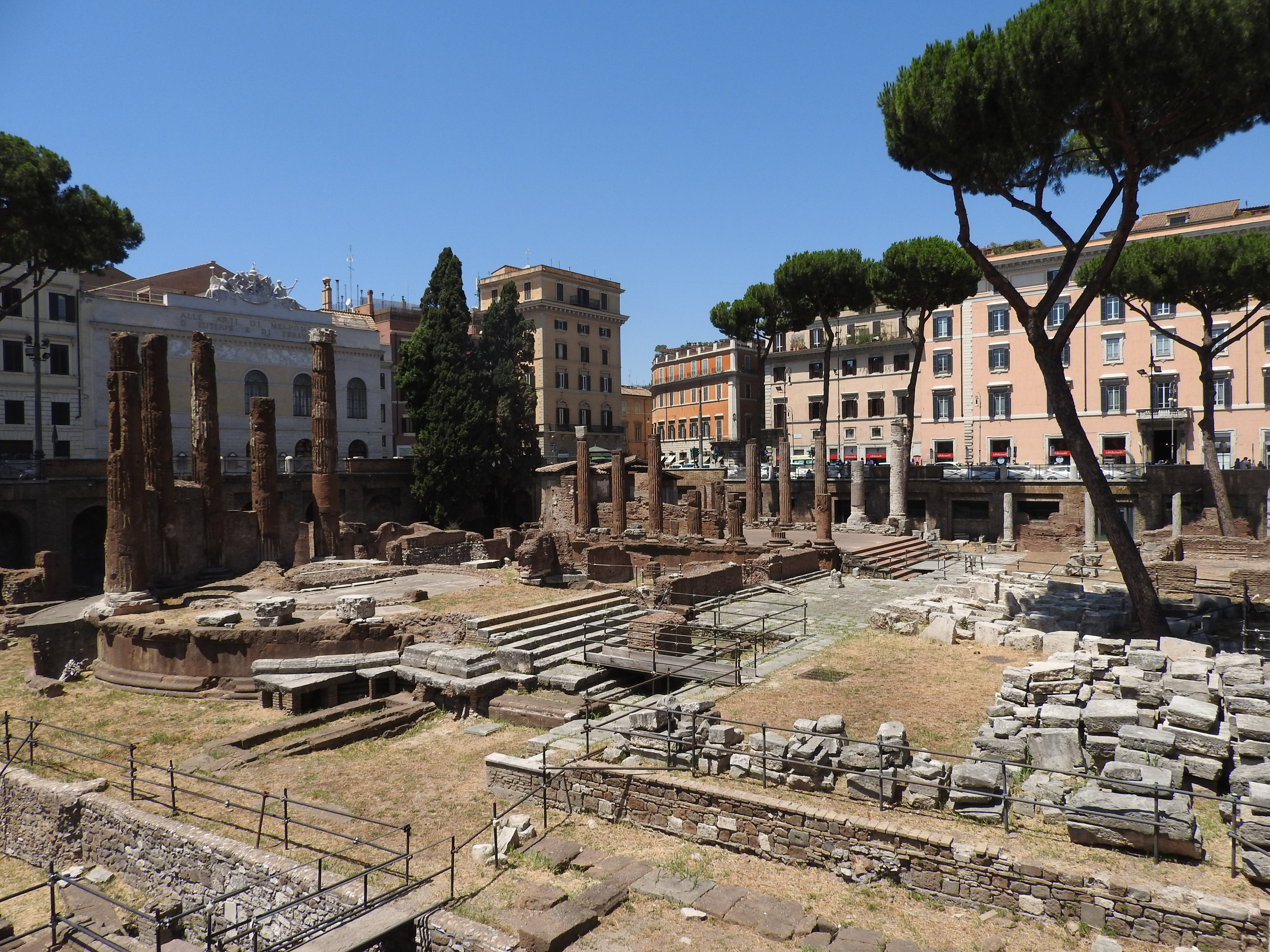
- Largo di Torre Argentina, Temple A (to Juturna) in the distance, Temple B in the center. In the distant left, the Teatro Argentina

- Shown within Augustan Rome
- 41°53′43″N 12°28′37″E
- Type: sanctuary
- Periods: Roman Republic, Roman Empire
- Cultures: Ancient Rome
- Location: Comune di Roma, Lazio, Italy
- Region: Lazio

History
- Built: 4th century BC – 1st century AD

Site notes
- Excavation dates: yes
- Public access: yes
- Website: AREA SACRA DI LARGO ARGENTINA

Largo di Torre Argentina (lit. 'Silver Tower Square', Italian: [ˈlarɡo di ˈtorre ardʒenˈtiːna]) is a large open space in Rome, Italy, with four Roman Republican temples and the remains of Pompey's Theatre. It is in the ancient Campus Martius. This was one of the places that the ancient "Argentario"—the silver/money men, the bankers—used to conduct their trade.

The name of the square comes from the Torre Argentina (Silver Tower), which takes its name from the city of Strasbourg whose Latin name was Argentoratum—Silver [city]. In 1503, the Papal Master of Ceremonies Johannes Burckardt, who came from Strasbourg and was known as "Argentinus", built in via del Sudario a palace (now at number 44), called Casa del Burcardo, to which the tower is annexed.

Julius Caesar was assassinated in the Curia of Pompey, and the spot where he is believed to have been assassinated is in the square.

After Italian unification, it was decided to reconstruct part of Rome (1909), demolishing the zone of Torre Argentina. However, during the demolition work in 1927, the colossal head and arms of a marble statue were discovered. The archaeological investigation brought to light the presence of a holy area, dating to the Republican era, with four temples and part of Pompey's Theatre.

In 2019, Rome's mayor Virginia Raggi announced that walkways would be installed in the site allowing the general public to tour the ruins for the first time.

== Roman temples ==
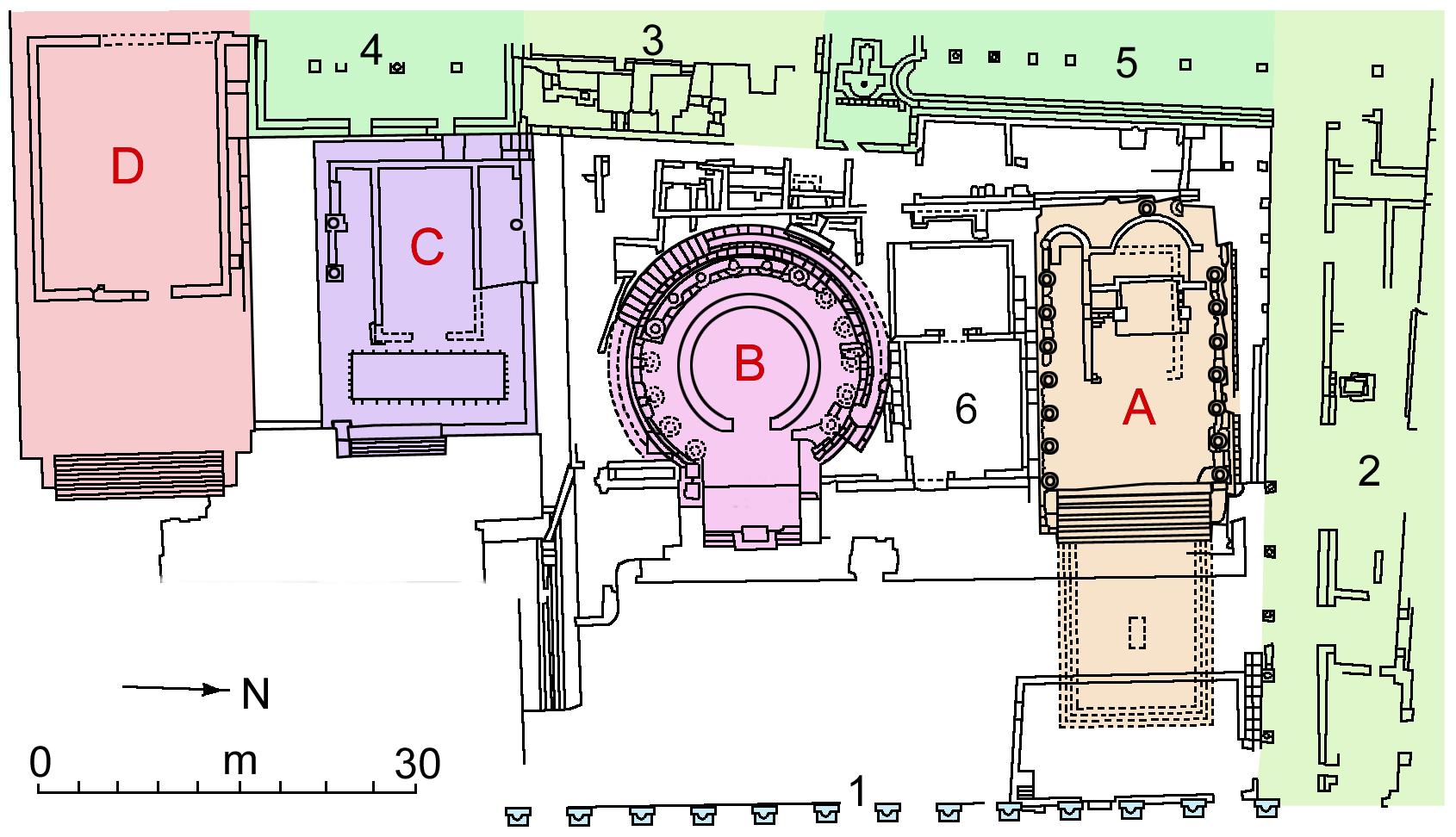
Map of the archaeological area

The four temples, originally designated by the letters A, B, C, and D, front onto a paved street, which was reconstructed in the imperial era, after the fire of AD 80. The area was delineated to the North by the Hecatostylum (one-hundred columns porch) and the Baths of Agrippa, and to the South by the buildings related to the Circus Flaminius, to the East by the great porched square of Porticus Minucia Frumentaria, and to the West by the Theatre of Pompey.

Temple A was built in the 3rd century BC, and is probably the Temple of Juturna built by Gaius Lutatius Catulus after his victory against the Carthaginians in 241 BC. The long area behind Temple A was used as a latrina or public toilet, and had no dividers or cubicles. In the early 900s, the temple was rebuilt as a church and was called San Nicola de Calcarario, of which the apses and frescoes are still present.

Temple B, a circular temple (tholos) with six columns remaining, was built by Quintus Lutatius Catulus in 101 BC in fulfillment of his vow at the Battle of Vercellae. The temple (aedes) was devoted to Fortuna Huiusce Diei, "the Fortune of This Day." The colossal statue found during excavations and now kept in the Centrale Montemartini of the Capitoline Museums was the statue of the goddess herself. Only the head, the arms, and the legs were made of marble: the other parts, covered by the dress, were of other materials, probably a wooden frame. This is known as an acrolithic statue.

Temple C is the most ancient of the four, with terracotta decoration dating back to the 290s/280s BC, and was probably devoted to Feronia, the ancient Italic goddess of fertility. After the fire of AD 80, this temple was restored, and the white and black mosaic of the inner temple cella dates back to this restoration.

Temple D is the largest of the four, dates back to the 2nd century BC with Late Republican restorations, and was devoted to Lares Permarini (Lares who protect sailors), but only a small part of it has been excavated (a street covers the most of it). It was vowed by the praetor, Lucius Aemilius Regillus, while engaged in a naval battle with the fleet of Antiochus the Great in 190 BC, and dedicated by M. Aemilius Lepidus, when censor, on 22 December, 179. On the doors of the temple was a dedicatory inscription in Saturnian metre. It is recorded as standing in porticu Minucia and therefore its exact site depends on that of the porticus.

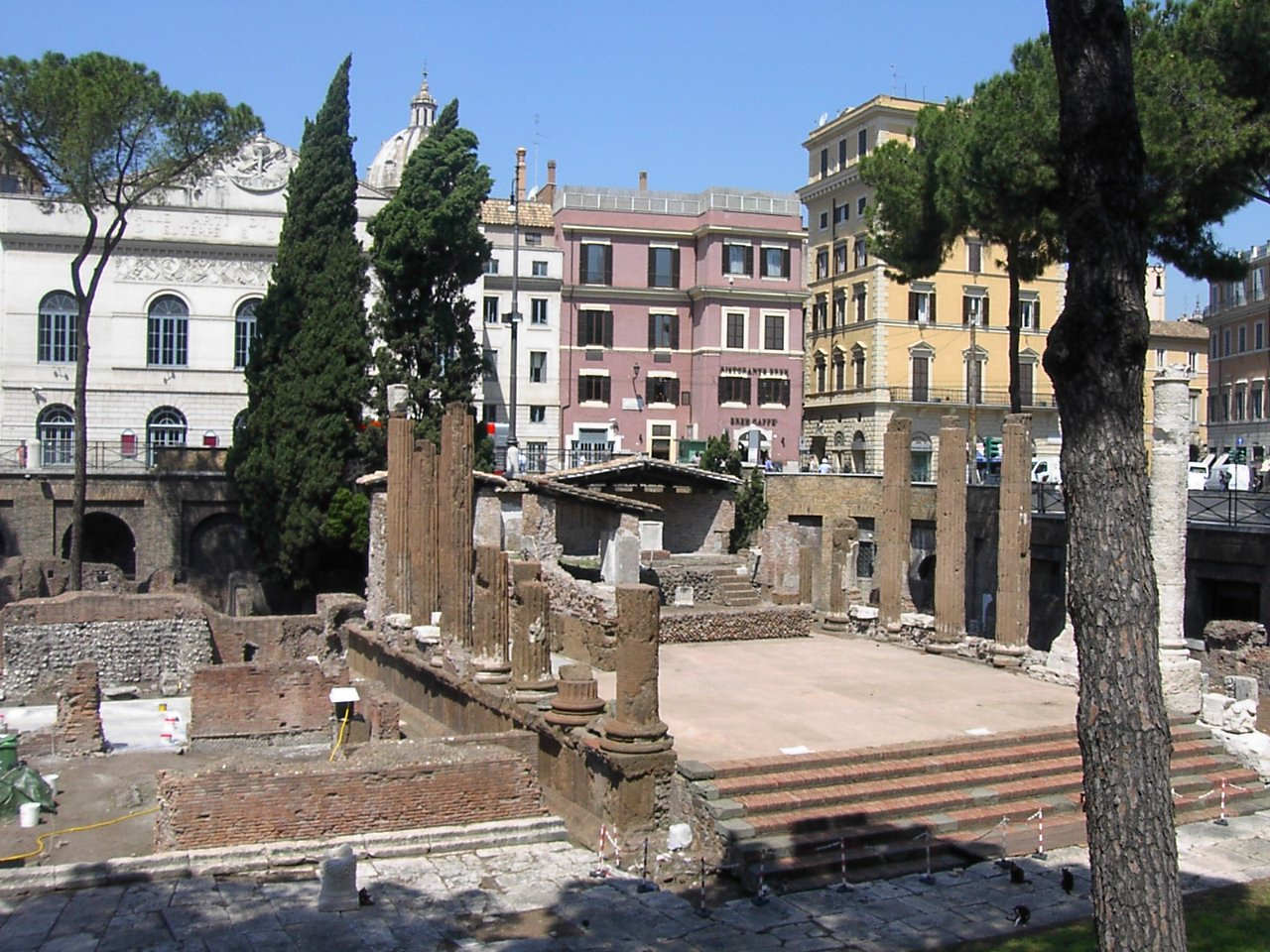
Temple A

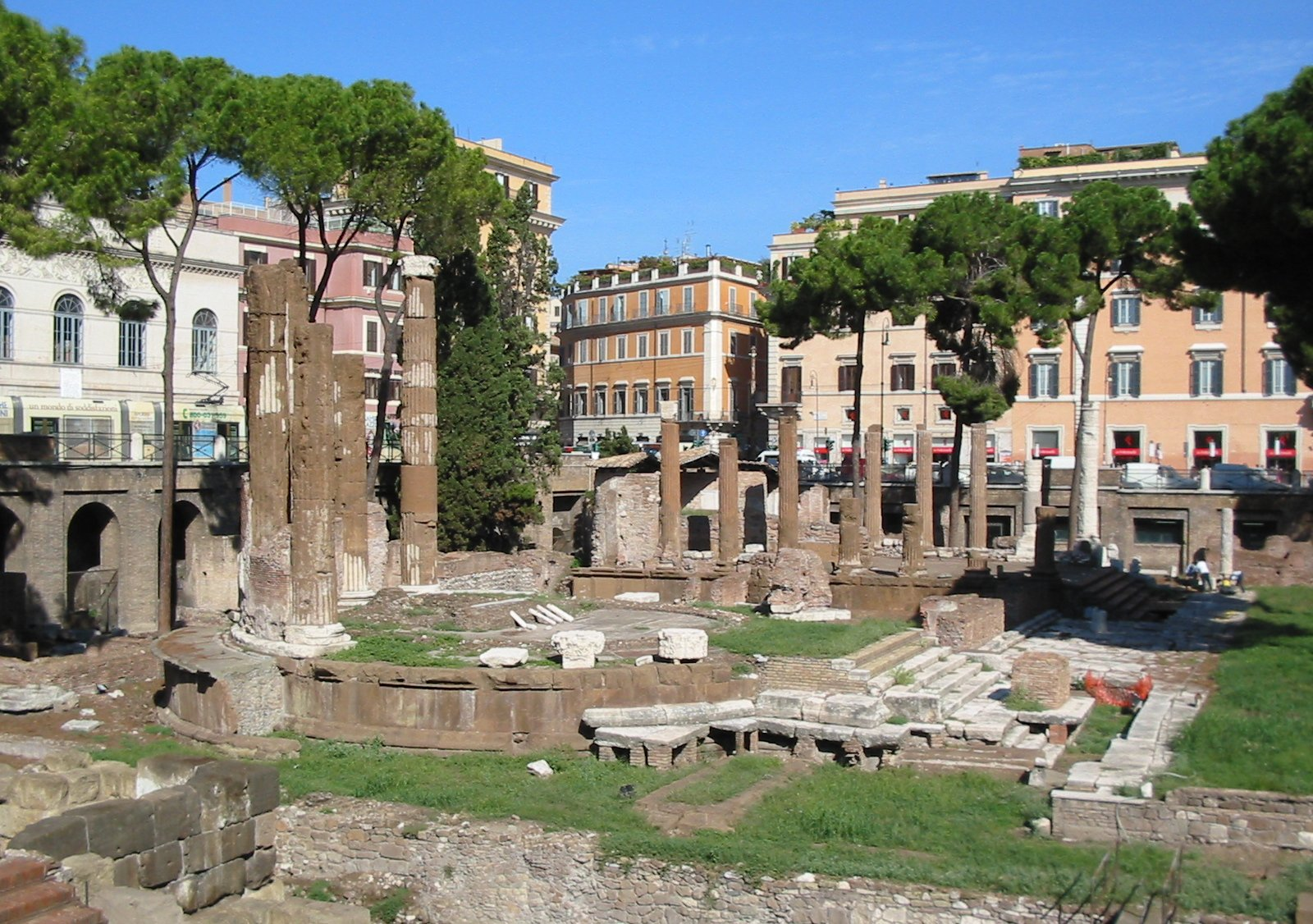
Temple B

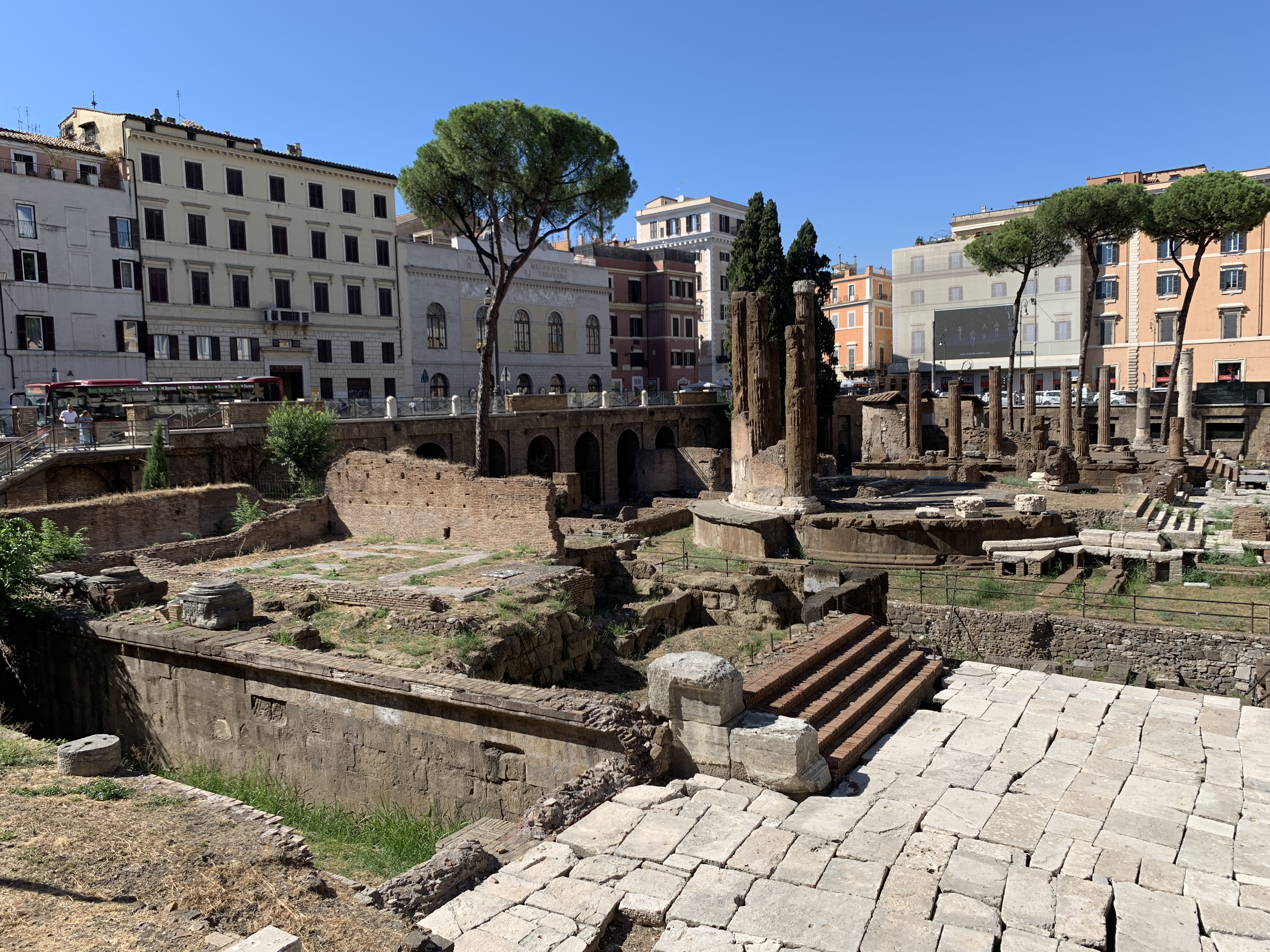
Temple C

== 18th century opera house ==
The Teatro Argentina is an 18th-century opera house and theatre located in the square. The premieres of many notable operas took place there. They include Gioachino Rossini's The Barber of Seville in 1816 and Giuseppe Verdi's I due Foscari in 1844 and La battaglia di Legnano in 1849.

== Cat shelter ==
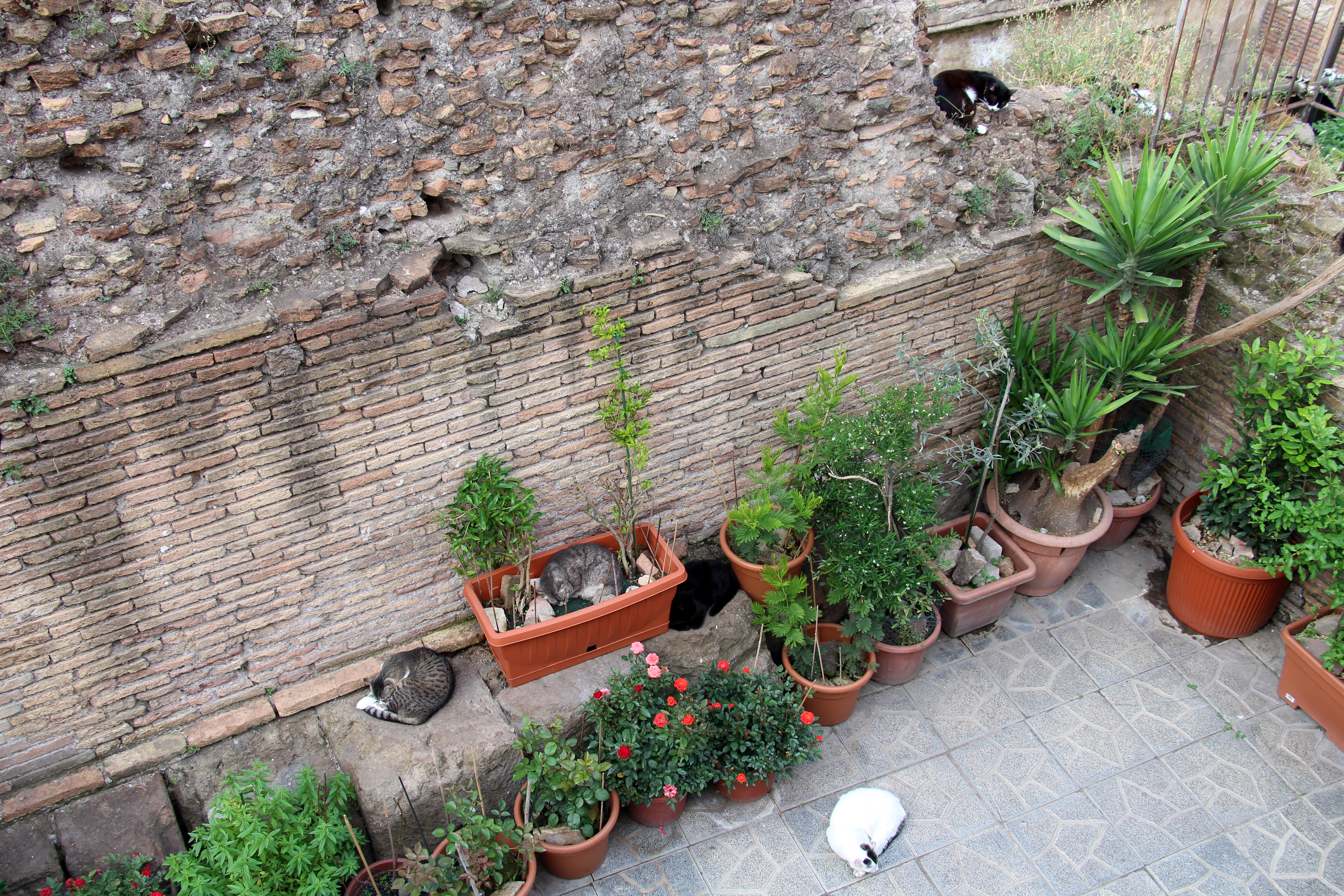
Largo di Torre Argentina cats

The Torre Argentina Cat Sanctuary is located in Temple D of the Largo di Torre Argentina. The cat shelter was founded in 1993 and offers sterilization and adoption programs that house an estimated 350 cats. The shelter operates as a no-kill shelter under Law no. 281, enacted by the Italian Parliament in 1991. These laws introduced: (i) the cats’ rights to live free and safe, (ii) institutionalization of cat caretakers. The shelter remains active, despite archaeologists' protests to dismantle the shelter in favor of protecting the excavation.

== See also ==
- List of Ancient Roman temples

Preceded by House of the Vestals	Landmarks of Rome; Largo di Torre Argentina	Succeeded by Lupercal
