= Johann Burckhardt =

Johann Burckhardt may refer to:

- Johann Karl Burckhardt (1773–1825), German astronomer and mathematician
- Johann Ludwig Burckhardt (1784–1817), Swiss traveler, geographer, and orientalist
- Johann Gottlieb Burckhardt (1836–1907), Swiss psychiatrist
- Johann Jakob Burckhardt (1903–2006), Swiss mathematician and crystallographer

== See also ==
- Johann Burchard (c. 1450–1506), Renaissance priest and chronicler
