= Niederhaslach Church =

Coordinates: 48°32′35″N 7°20′29″E

- Église paroissiale Saint-Jean Baptiste; Collégiale Saint-Florent
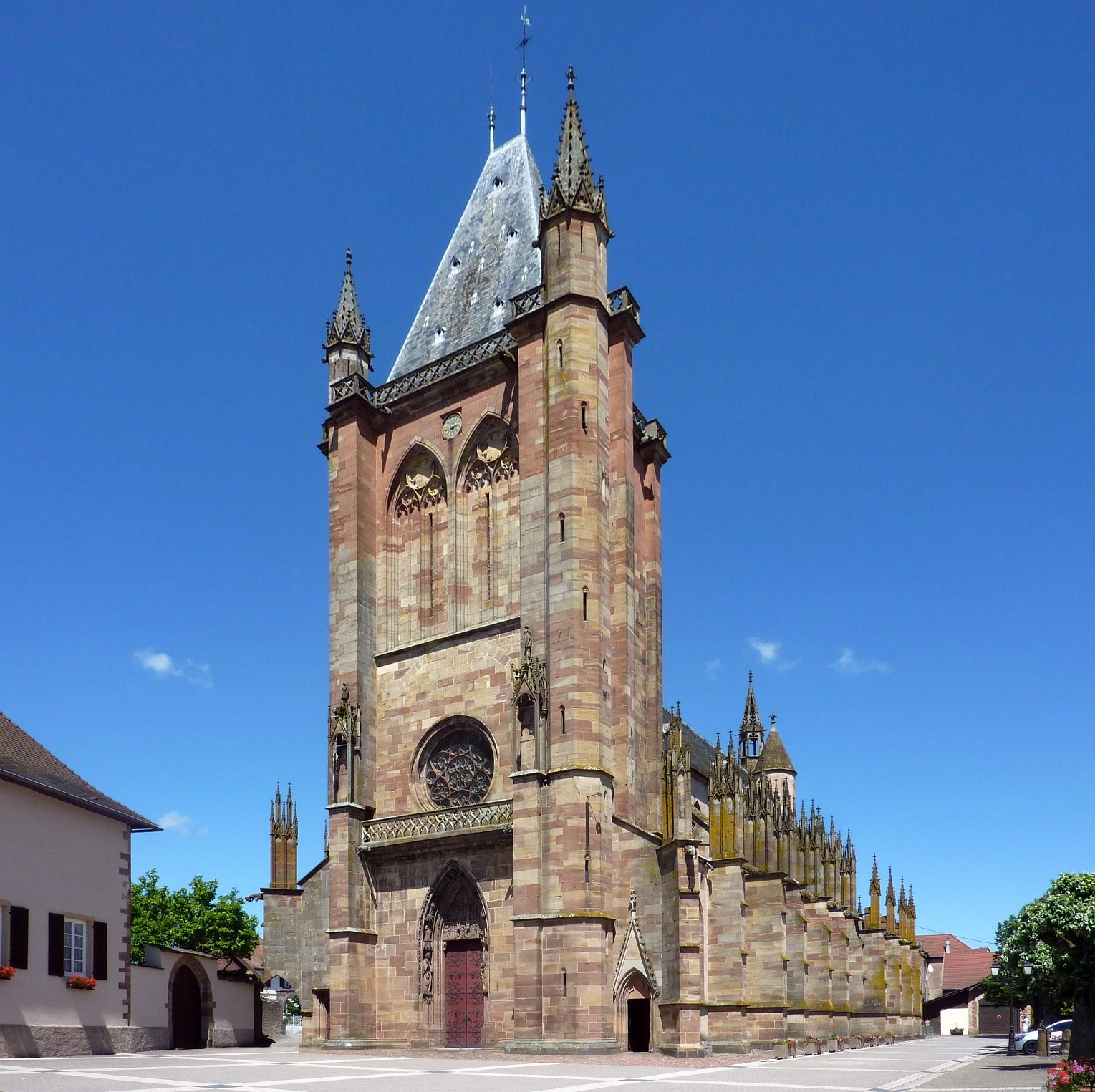
- Niederhaslach Church
- Location: Niederhaslach
- Country: France
- Denomination: Roman Catholic Church

History
- Founded: 1274

Architecture
- Heritage designation: Monument historique
- Designated: 1846
- Architect: Gerlach von Steinbach
- Style: Gothic architecture
- Groundbreaking: 1274
- Completed: 1385

Specifications
- Length: 51.1 m (168 ft)
- Height: 42 m (138 ft)

Administration
- Archdiocese: Strasbourg

The Roman Catholic Parish church Saint John the Baptist (French: Église paroissiale Saint-Jean Baptiste), formerly Collegiate church Saint Florentius (Collégiale Saint-Florent) is the main church of the small city of Niederhaslach in Alsace. The building is widely considered one of the finest and most ornate examples of Gothic architecture and Gothic art in the Bas-Rhin departement of France.

== History ==
The church, which was originally dedicated to Florentius of Strasbourg, bishop of Strasbourg from 618 to 624, was built from 1274 on as a replacement for a building from the 7th century that had been the shrine since 810 (by order of bishop Ratho) of relics of the Saint. The new church was under construction until 1385: a fire on 4 June 1287 that destroyed everything but the choir as well as the accidental death of the architect Gerlach von Steinbach (the son of Erwin von Steinbach) in 1330 had slowed down its completion. The church was plundered during the German Peasants' War in 1525 and on 6 June 1633, it was burned by Swedish mercenaries during the Thirty Years' War. The building was neglected during the following two centuries and even served as a slaughterhouse in 1744. The French Revolution, however, spared the church, but dissolved the chapter to which it belonged. The church was thoroughly restored from 1853 to 1887 by architects Émile Boeswillwald and Charles Winkler, and again from 1990 to 2006.

Niederhaslach's church is listed as a Monument historique since 1846 by the French Ministry of Culture.

== Furnishing ==
=== Stained glass windows ===
Niederhaslach's church prides itself with one of the most complete and well preserved/restored collections of medieval stained glass windows in Alsace after Strasbourg Cathedral. The nave and choir display a large number of windows from the 13th and 14th century, remarkable for their shining nuances of blue and red and the number and variety of represented human figures. They represent the life of Jesus and Mary as well as of John the Baptist. The most famous window, being the most original in its design, is the one showing the predication of John the Baptist, the central figure being displayed life-sized. The façade shows a rose window of the year 1325.

=== Sculptures ===
Outside

- Grand portal of 1310 representing the Annunciation, the Coronation of Mary and the Legend of Saint Florentius
- Numerous gargoyles all around the building in the shape of humans and beasts
- Remains of the cemetery: tombstones of clerical people from the 14th to the 18th century
- Bas-relief "Christ on the Mount of Olives" (1492).

Inside

- Representation of the Holy Sepulchre (14th century); tombstone of Gerlach von Steinbach (1330)
- Keystones of the Gothic vault
- Late medieval tomb of bishop Ratho
- Choir stalls (1691)
- Reliquary of Saint Florentius (1714)
- Life-sized group of statues "Crucifixion scene" (1740)

=== Pipe organ ===
On the inside of the façade is a pipe organ from 1903.

== Gallery ==
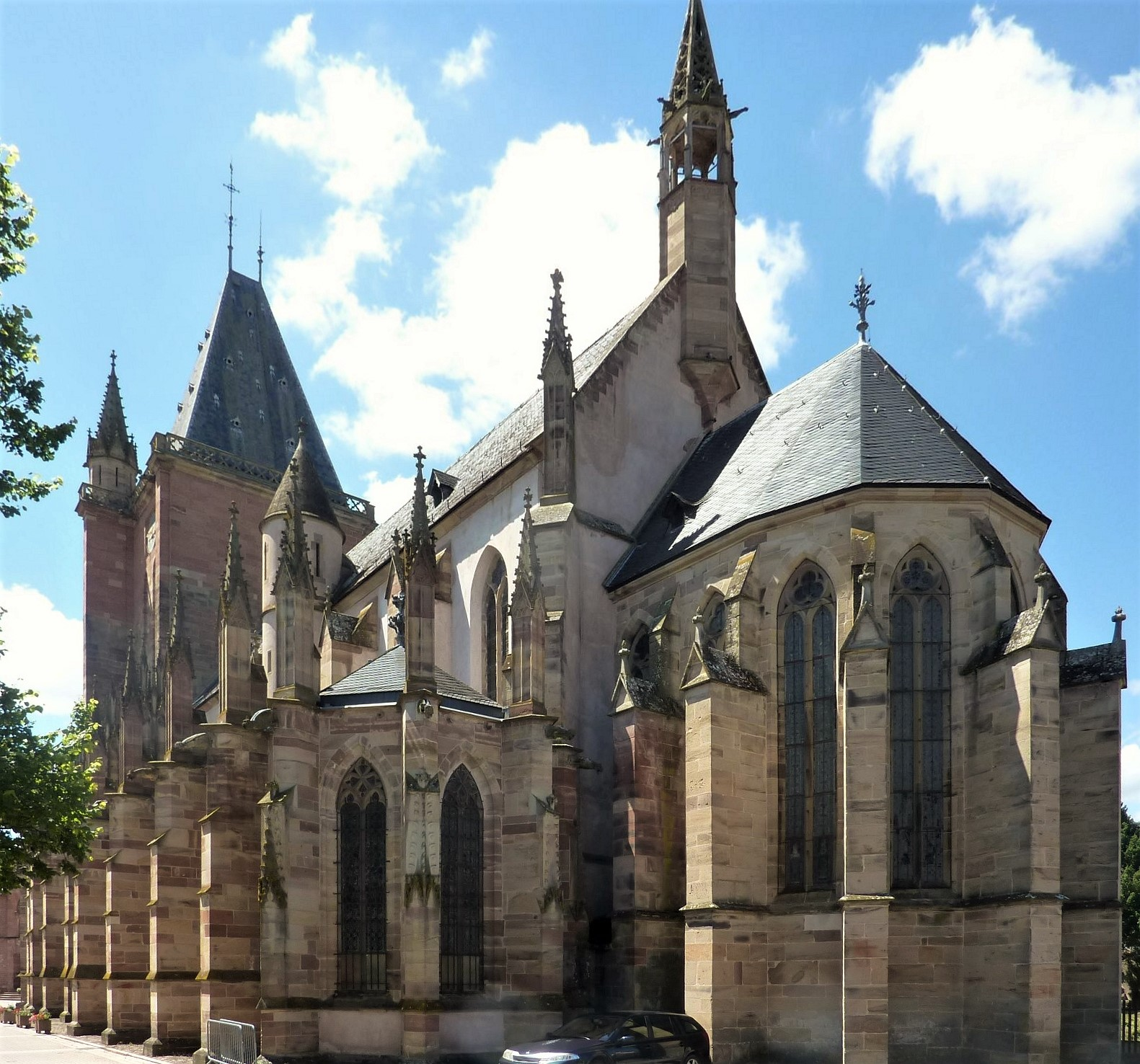
Lateral view

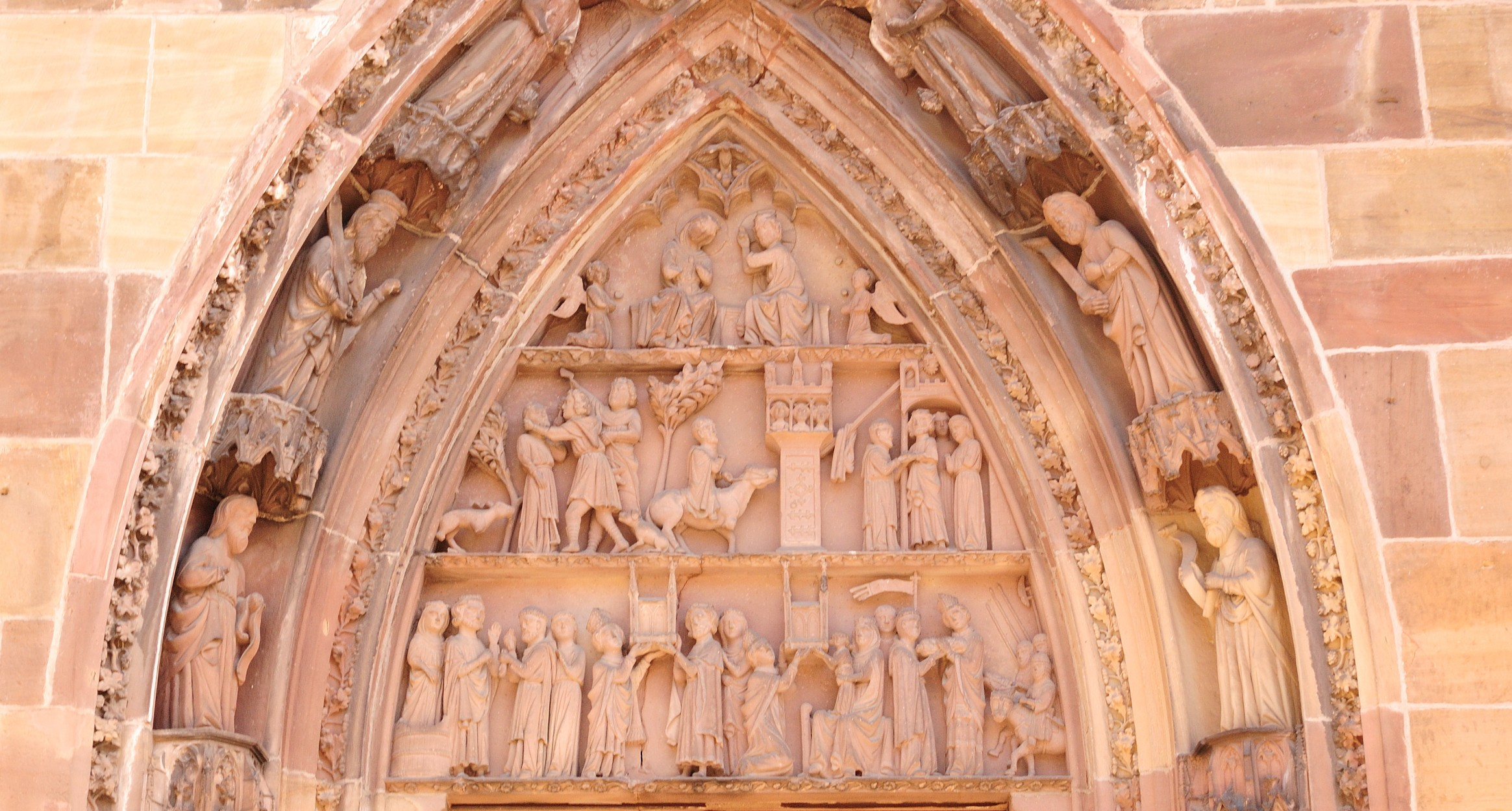
Tympanum of the main portal

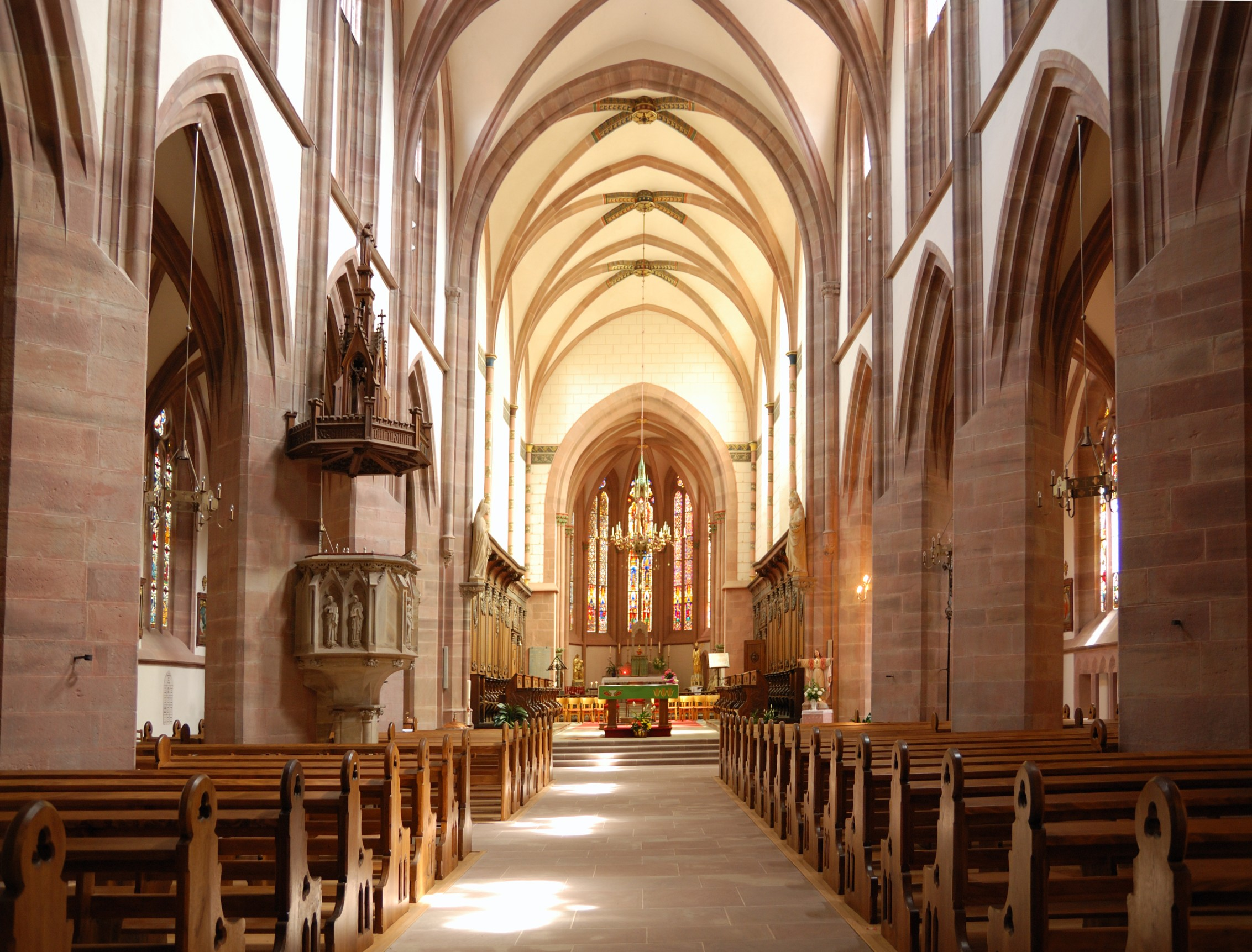
The nave looking towards the choir

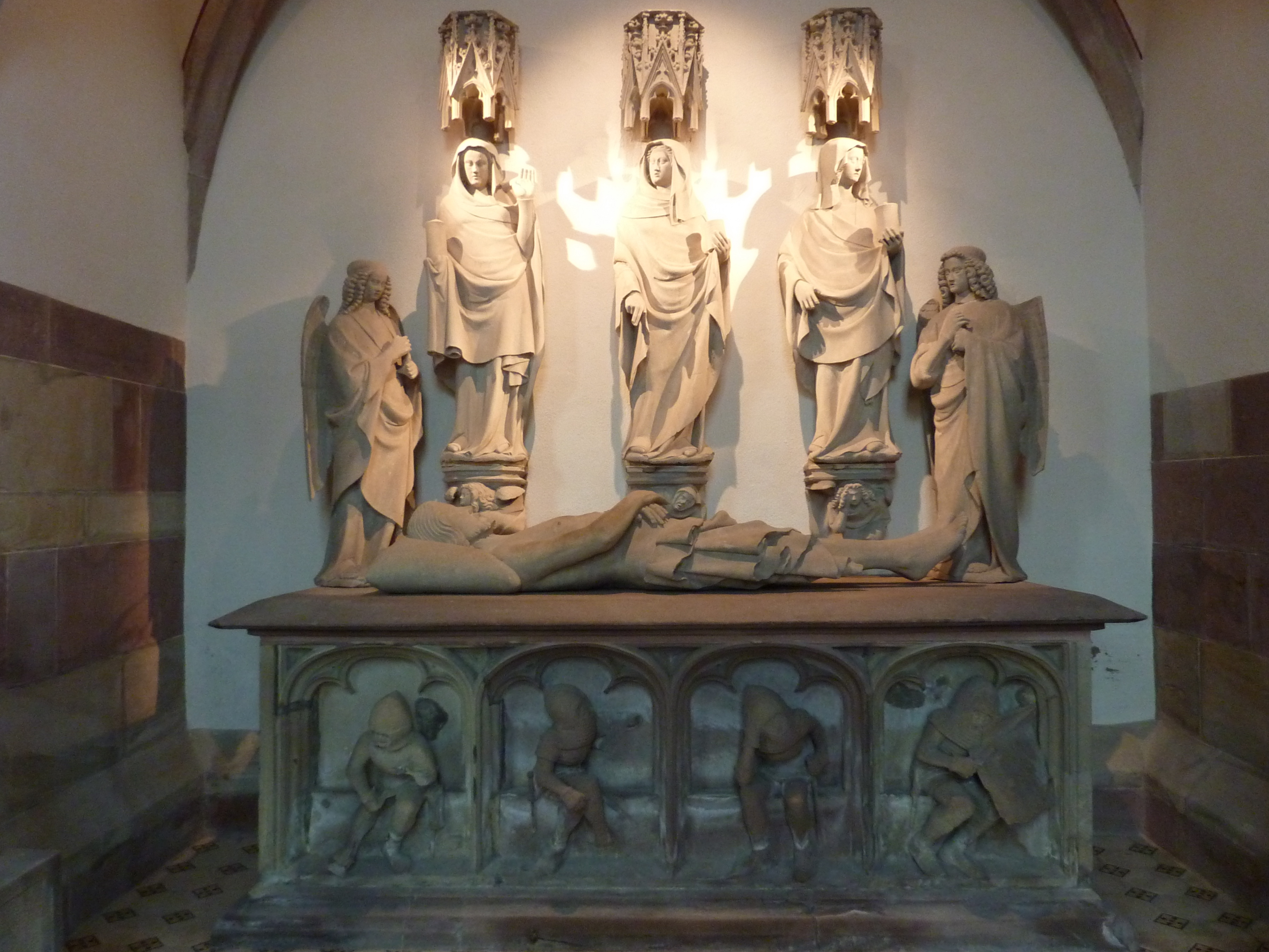
Entombement of Christ

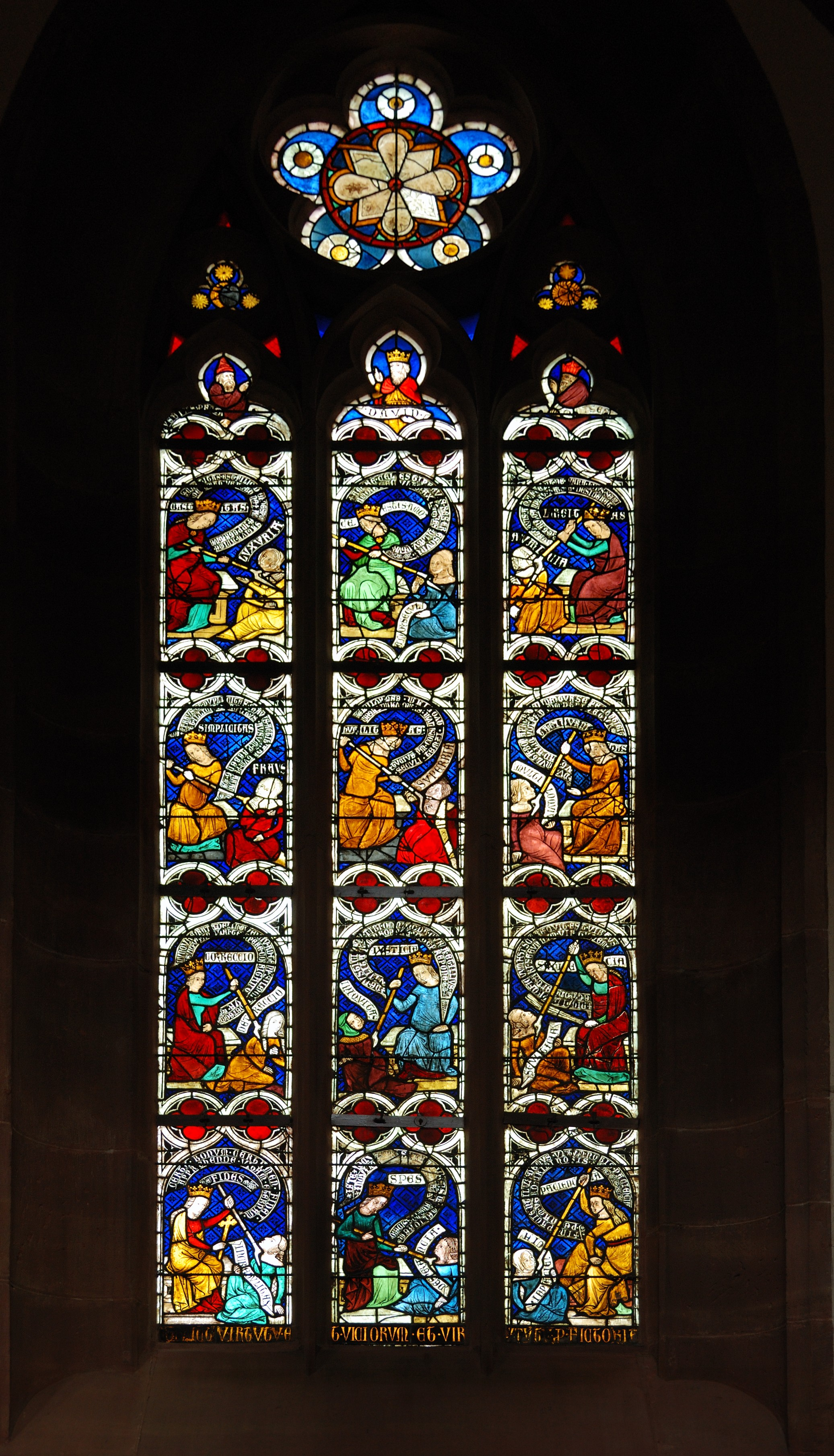
Stained glass window "Virtues fighting vices"

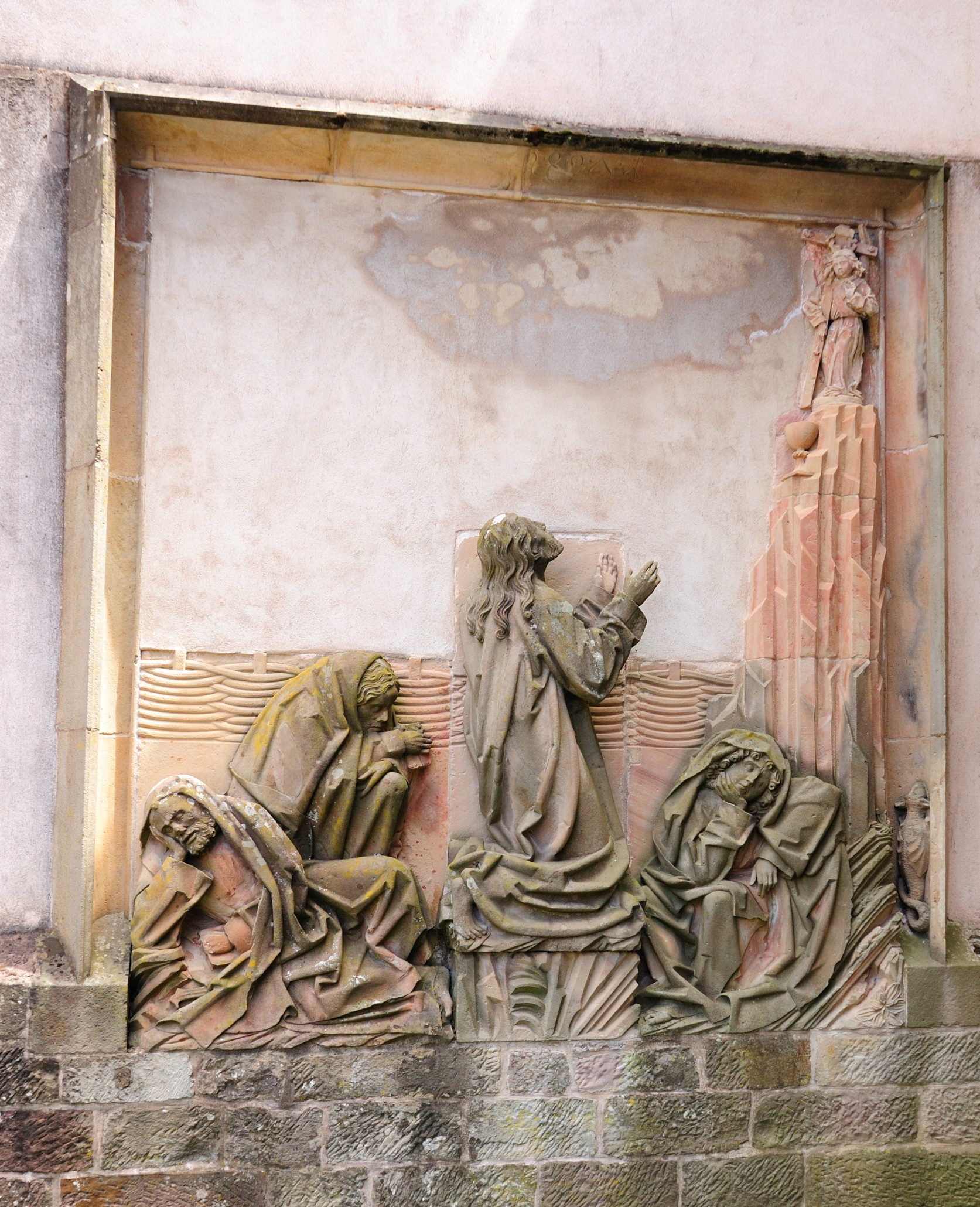
Relief "Christ on the Mount of Olives"

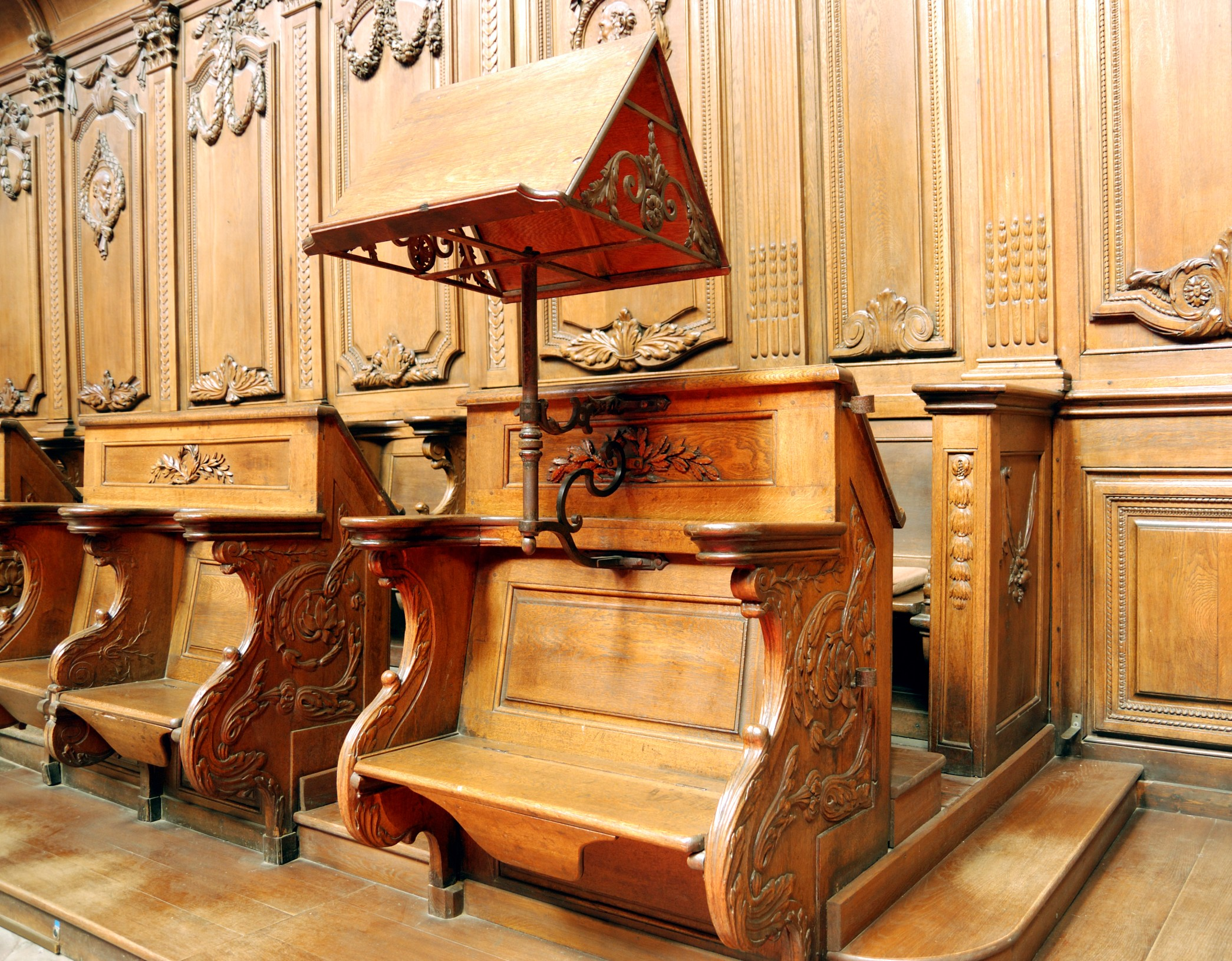
Choir stalls

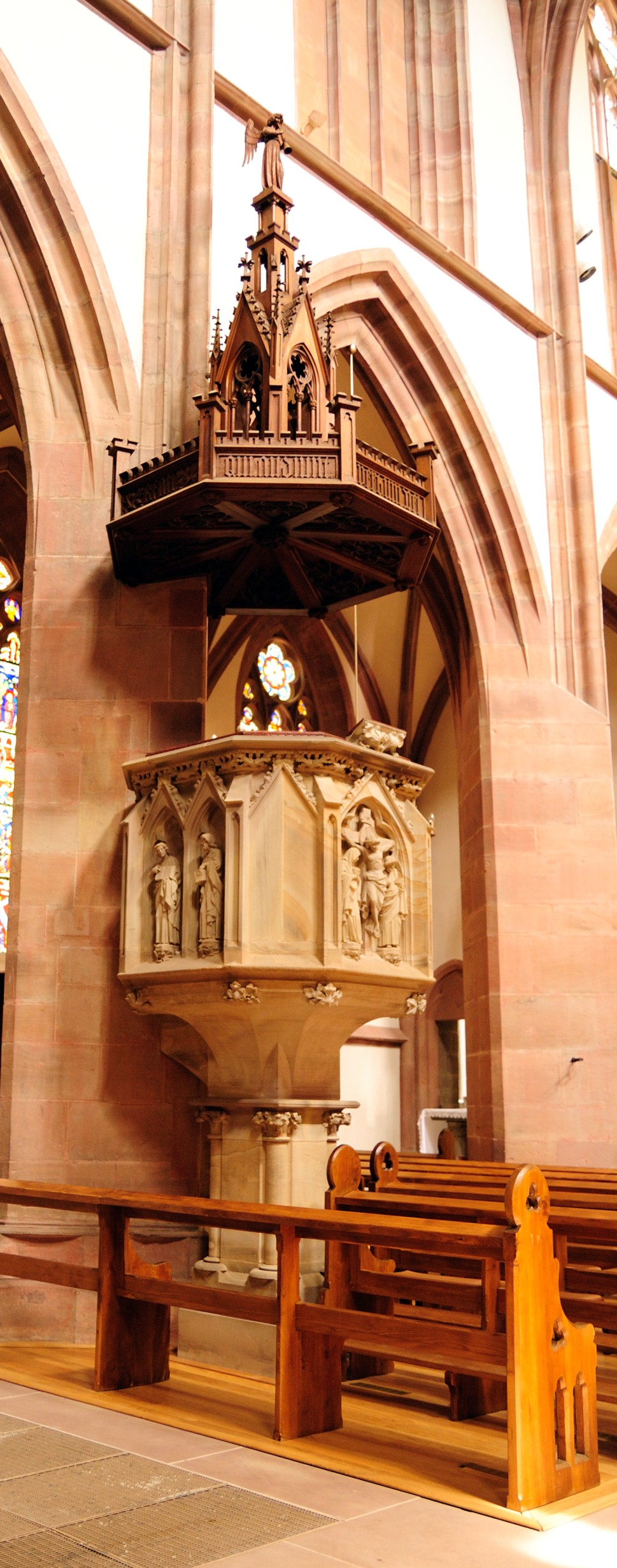
Pulpit

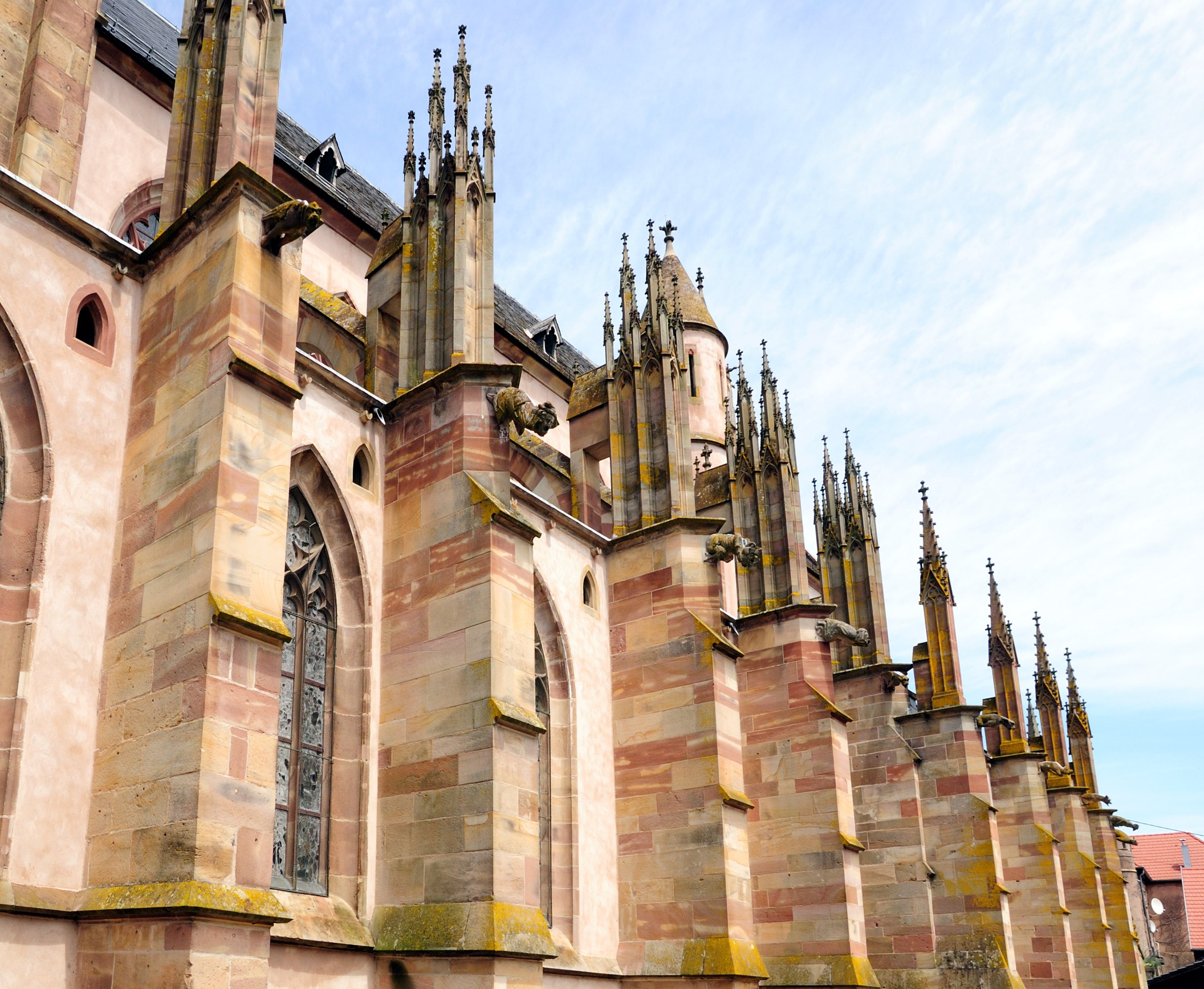
Buttresses

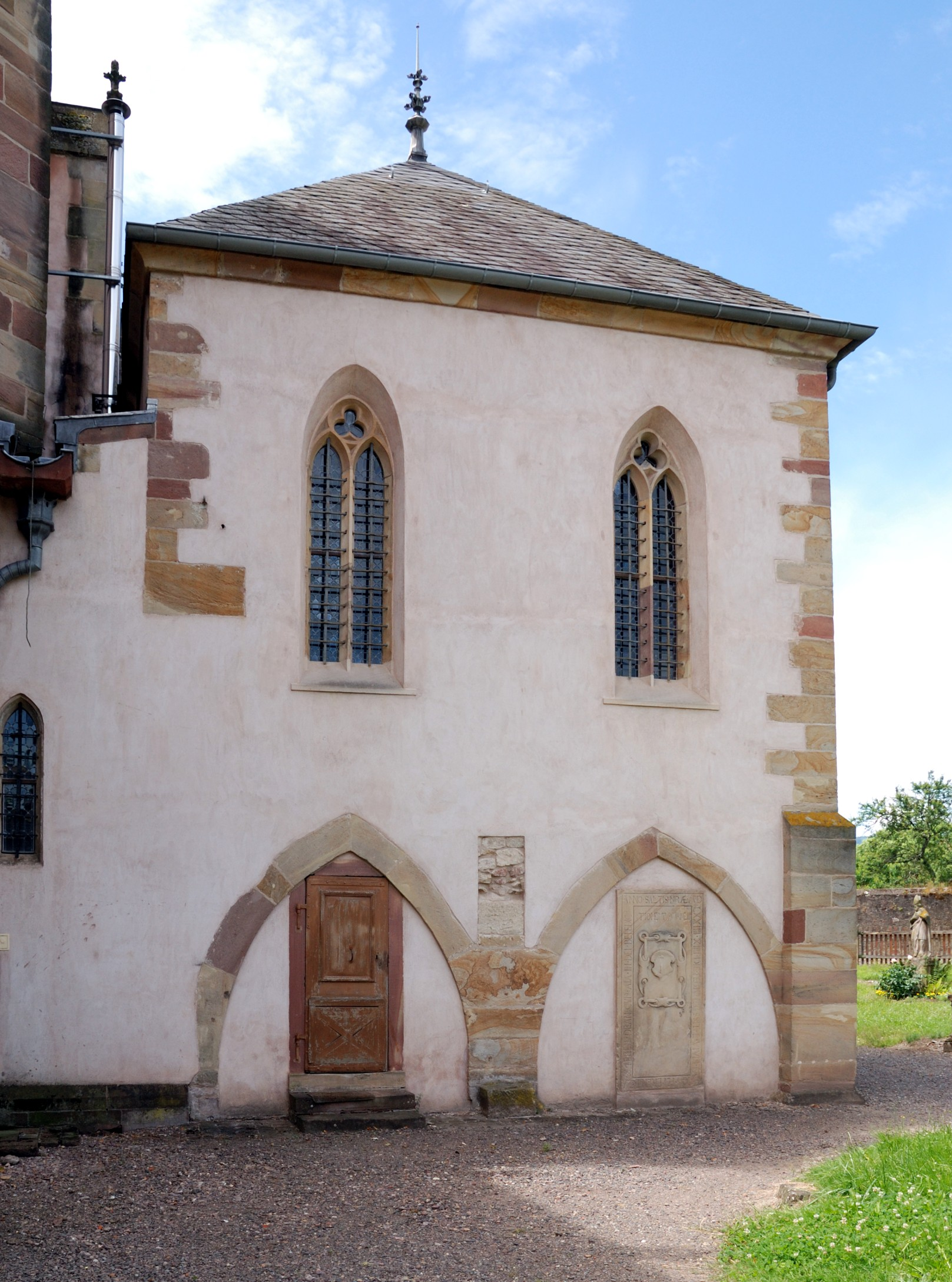
Sacristy (14th century)

== Dimensions ==
The known dimensions are as follows

- Height of spire: 42 metres (138 feet)
- Length of central nave: 26.25 metres (86.1 feet)
- Total length: 51.1 metres (168 feet)
