= Torre Argentina Cat Sanctuary =

Cat shelter in Rome

The Torre Argentina Cat Sanctuary is a cat shelter in Rome, Italy, that makes use of the ancient ruins of Largo di Torre Argentina by providing a home within them for around 150 cats.

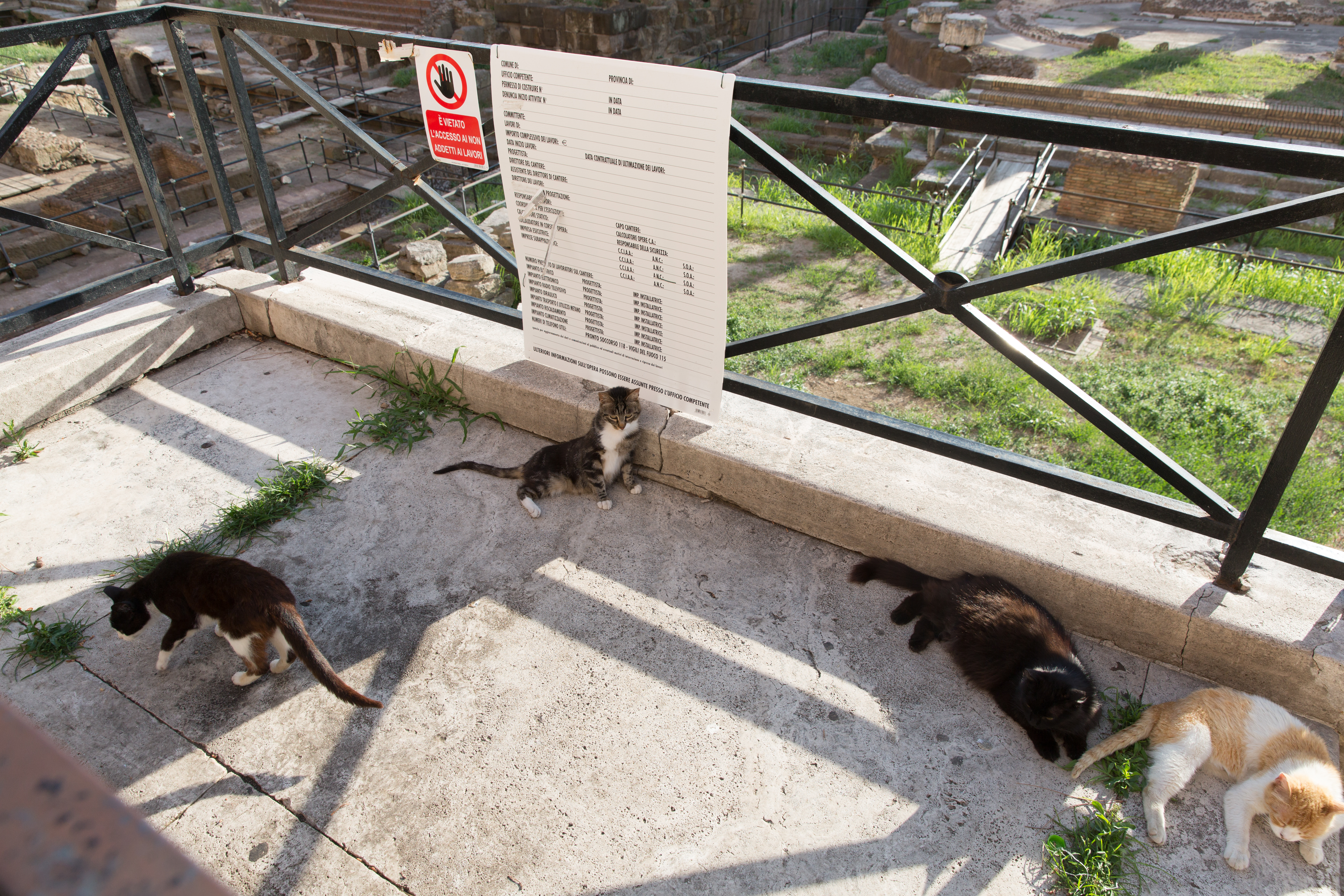
Cats at the sanctuary

After the excavation of the temple ruins in 1929, feral cats were drawn to the area, sheltered by Roman pillars and fed by locals. In the 1950s, an actor named Antonio Crast found the old warehouse where archeologists of the 1920s stored their tools. It was there that he began feeding the feral cats. The warehouse key was passed over the years from one person to another, mostly cat lovers connected with the theater. One of these people was Italian actor Anna Magnani. After Magnani's death, Italian actor Franca Stoppi took over the care of the Torre Argentina colony. The keys to the warehouse were passed down until they landed in the hands of the founders of the sanctuary—one of them being Lia Dequel. Since then the shelter has grown, with volunteers coming every day of the week to feed, care for, and vaccinate the cats.

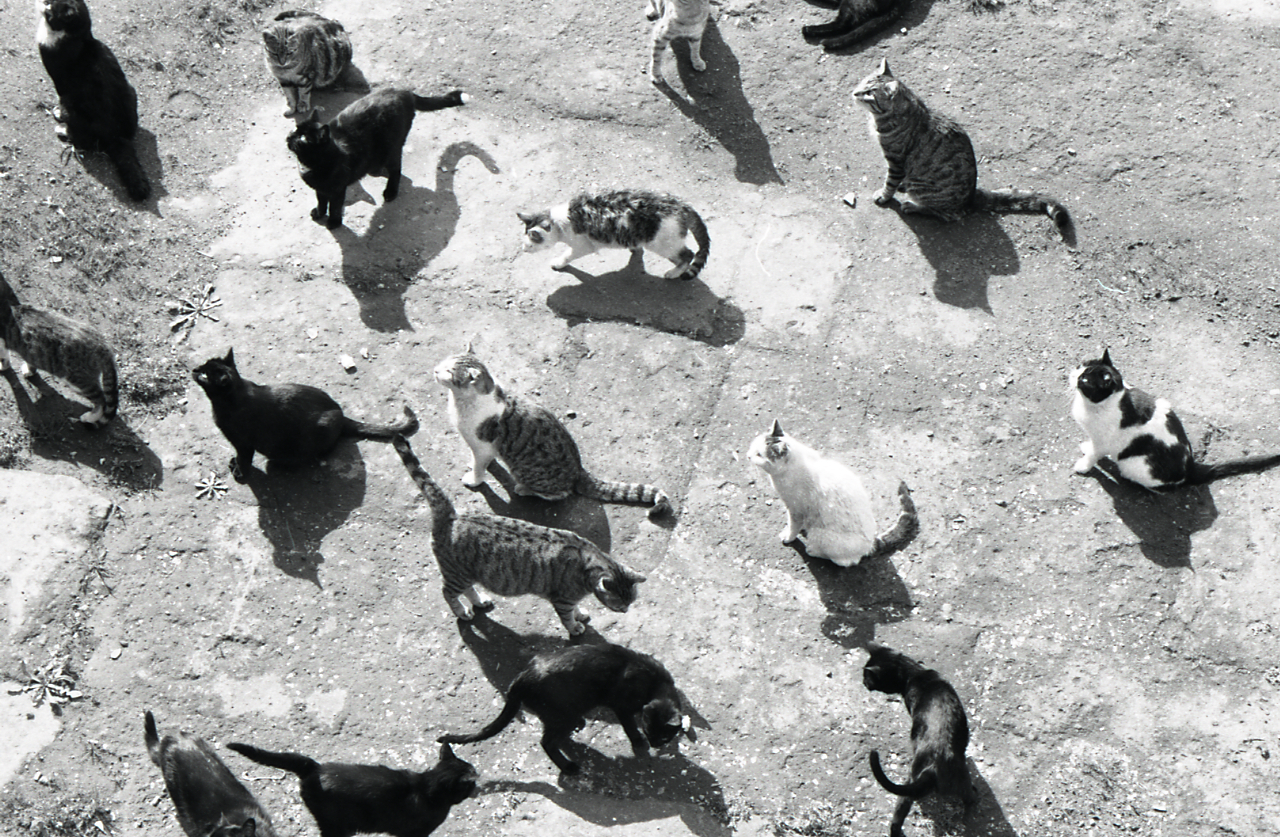
More cats at Torre Argentina

The shelter's main goal is sterilizing the cats. They spay and neuter cats in order to control the feral cat population. Not only do they spay and neuter cats in their own colony, but they also focus efforts on spaying and neutering and vaccinating cats of other colonies. They have, in the last decade, managed to reach out to 27,000 colonies of cats. They also have many cats up for adoption. They hope to find loving homes for many of the felines in the sanctuary. On average, the sanctuary finds loving homes for 125 cats a year. In their headquarters the shelter provides a home for disabled and elderly cats, who are less likely to be adopted. The shelter is open to visitors every day. People can come in to meet the cats, and to browse souvenirs made by the volunteers at the shelter. All proceeds go towards the cats there, and donations, like these, allow the shelter to stay in operation.

In 2012, the shelter faced closure when national archaeological officials demanded that the cat sanctuary be evicted from the ruins. Over 30,000 signatures were collected for petitions in favor of preserving the cat sanctuary and keeping it running. Despite a compromise, the sanctuary still lives with the threat of an eviction—relying on donations more than ever in order to keep their home at Torre Argentina.

In 2019, the podcast This is Love visited Torre Argentina and spoke with co-founder Silvia Viviani for their episode, "Silvia and the Cats."
