= Niederhaslach =

- Commune
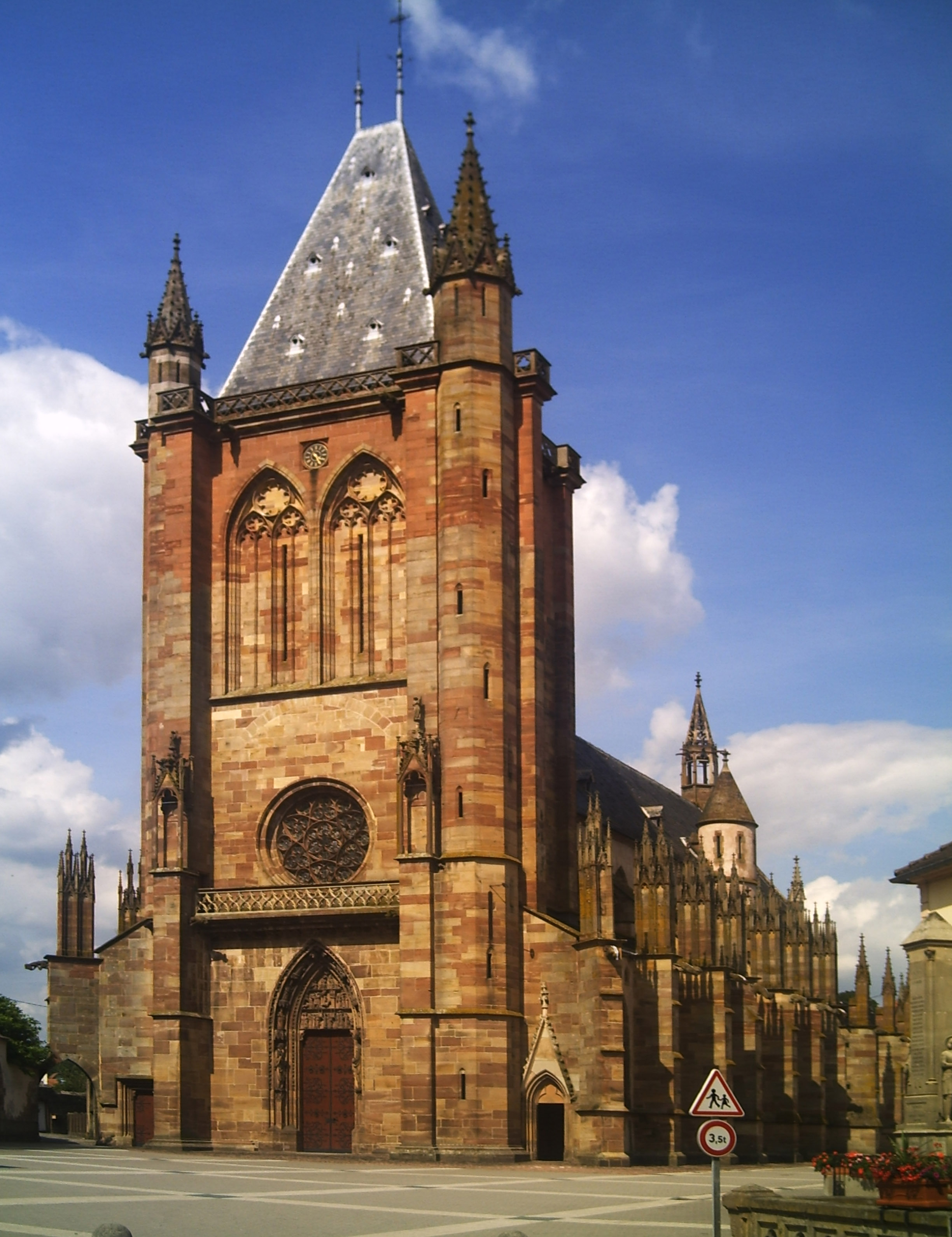
- The church in Niederhaslach

- Coat of arms
- Location of Niederhaslach
- Location within France Location within Grand Est
- Coordinates: 48°32′N 7°20′E
- Country: France
- Region: Grand Est
- Department: Bas-Rhin
- Arrondissement: Molsheim
- Canton: Mutzig
- Area^{1}: 6.6 km^{2} (2.5 sq mi)
- Elevation: 255 m (837 ft)
- Population (2023): 1,383
  - Density: 210/km^{2} (540/sq mi)
- Time zone: UTC+01:00 (CET)
  - Summer (DST): UTC+02:00 (CEST)
- INSEE/Postal code: 67325 /67280
- ^{1} French Land Register data, which excludes lakes, ponds, glaciers > 1 km^{2} (0.386 sq mi or 247 acres) and river estuaries.

Niederhaslach is a commune in the Bas-Rhin department in Grand Est in north-eastern France.

It is noteworthy for its Gothic 13th-15th century Niederhaslach Church.

== See also ==
- Oberhaslach, a neighbouring commune
- Communes of the Bas-Rhin department
