= November 7 in the Roman Martyrology =

<<	November					>>
Su	Mo	Tu	We	Th	Fr	Sa
1	2	3	4	5	6	7
8	9	10	11	12	13	14
15	16	17	18	19	20	21
22	23	24	25	26	27	28
29	30

In the Roman Rite of the Catholic Church, the Roman Martyrology is a directory of liturgical commemorations for each day of the year. There are two editions of the Martyrology currently authorized for use: the 2004 edition (the most recent) and the 1960 revision of the 1956 edition (as permitted under Summorum Pontificum). The following commemorations are listed for November 7 in each respective edition:

== Ordinary form (2004 edition) ==
- St. Prosdocimus, first Bishop of Padua
- St. Athenodorus of Neocaesarea, Bishop, brother of St. Gregory Thaumaturgus
- St. Amaranthus of Albi, Martyr
- Sts. Hiero and companions, Martyrs of Melitine
- St. Herculanus, Bishop of Perugia and Martyr
- St. Baud, Bishop of Tours
- St. Congar of Congresbury, Abbot
- St. Florentius, Bishop of Argentoratum (Strasbourg)
- St. Willibrord, Bishop of Utrecht
- St. Lazarus, Stylite of Mount Galesios
- St. Engelbert, Bishop of Cologne and Martyr
- Bl. Anthony Baldinucci SJ, Priest and Missionary
- Sts. Jacinto Castañeda OP and Vincent Lê Quang Liêm OP, Martyrs of Vietnam
- St. Peter Wu Guosheng, Catechist and Martyr of China
- St. Vincent Grossi, (Note: The 2004 edition lists him as a Blessed. He was canonized in 2015.) Priest, Founder of the Daughters of the Oratory

== Extraordinary form (1960 edition) ==
- St. Prosdocimus, first Bishop of Padua
- St. Herculanus, Bishop of Perugia and Martyr
- St. Engelbert, Bishop of Cologne and Martyr
- St. Amaranthus of Albi, Martyr
- Sts. Hiero, Nicander, Hesychius, and 30 companions, Martyrs of Melitine under Governor Lysias and Emperor Diocletian
- Sts. Auctus, Taurio, and Thessalonica, Martyrs of Amphipolis
- Sts. Melasippus, Antony, and Carina, Martyrs of Ancyra under Julian the Apostate
- St. Achillas, Bishop of Alexandria
- St. Willibrord, Bishop of Utrecht
- St. Rufus, Bishop of Metz and Confessor
- St. Florentius, Bishop of Strasbourg

== See also ==
- November 7 (Eastern Orthodox liturgics)

== Sources ==
=== 2004 edition ===
- Martyrologium Romanum (in Latin) (2nd ed.). Vatican City: Libreria Editrice Vaticana. 2004. pp. 610–612.

=== 1960 edition ===
- Martyrologium Romanum (in Latin) (revised post-typical 4th ed.). Justitias Books. 2017 [1956 with 1960 revisions]. pp. 273–274.
- The Roman Martyrology. Translated by O'Connell, Canon J.B. (revised post-typical 4th ed.). Westminster: Newman Press. 1962. pp. 242–243.
