= November 1 in the Roman Martyrology =

<<	November					>>
Su	Mo	Tu	We	Th	Fr	Sa
						1
2	3	4	5	6	7	8
9	10	11	12	13	14	15
16	17	18	19	20	21	22
23	24	25	26	27	28	29
30

In the Roman Rite of the Catholic Church, the Roman Martyrology is a directory of liturgical commemorations for each day of the year. There are two editions of the Martyrology currently authorized for use: the 2004 edition (the most recent) and the 1960 revision of the 1956 edition (as permitted under Summorum Pontificum). The following commemorations are listed for November 1 in each respective edition:

== Ordinary form (2004 edition) ==
=== General calendar ===
- Solemnity of All Saints

=== Martyrology only ===
- St. Caesarius of Terracina, Martyr
- St. Benignus of Dijon, Priest and Martyr
- St. Austromoine, Bishop
- St. Marcellus, Bishop of Paris
- St. Rómulo of Bourges, Priest and Abbot
- St. Severin of Tivoli, Monk
- St. Magnus, Bishop of Milan
- St. Vigor, Bishop of Bayeux
- St. Licinius, Bishop of Angers
- St. Maturin of Larchant, Priest
- St. Audomar, Bishop of Thérouanne
- Bl. Ranieri Rasini OFM, Religious
- St. Nuno Álvares Pereira (Note: The 2004 edition lists him as a Blessed. He was canonized in 2009.)
- Bls. Peter Paul Navarro SJ, Dionysius Fujishima SJ, and Peter Onizuka Sandayu SJ, Religious, and Clement Kyuemon, Martyrs of Japan
- Sts. Jerome Hermosilla OP and Valentine Berriochoa OP, Bishops, and Peter Almató Ribeira OP, Priest, Martyrs of Vietnam
- Bl. Rupert Mayer SJ, Priest
- Bl. Theodore George Romzha, Bishop and Martyr

== Extraordinary form (1960 edition) ==
=== General calendar ===
- Feast of All Saints

=== Martyrology only ===
- Sts. John, Bishop, and James, Priest, Martyrs of Persia under Shapur II
- Sts. Caesarius, Deacon, and Julian, Priest, Martyrs of Terracina
- St. Benignus of Dijon, Priest and Martyr
- Sts. Caesarius, Dacius, and 5 companions, Martyrs of Damascus
- St. Mary, Martyr under Hadrian
- Sts. Cyrenia and Juliana, Martyrs of Tarsus under Maximian
- St. Austromoine, first Bishop of Clermont
- St. Marcellus, Bishop of Paris
- St. Vigor, Bishop of Bayeux
- St. Licinius, Bishop of Angers
- St. Severin of Tivoli, Monk
- St. Maturin of Larchant, Confessor

== See also ==
- November 1 (Eastern Orthodox liturgics)

== Sources ==
=== 2004 edition ===
- Martyrologium Romanum (in Latin) (2nd ed.). Vatican City: Libreria Editrice Vaticana. 2004. pp. 600–601.

=== 1960 edition ===
- Martyrologium Romanum (in Latin) (revised post-typical 4th ed.). Justitias Books. 2017 [1956 with 1960 revisions]. pp. 268–269.
- The Roman Martyrology. Translated by O'Connell, Canon J.B. (revised post-typical 4th ed.). Westminster: Newman Press. 1962. pp. 238–239.
