= November 3 in the Roman Martyrology =

<<	November					>>
Su	Mo	Tu	We	Th	Fr	Sa
						1
2	3	4	5	6	7	8
9	10	11	12	13	14	15
16	17	18	19	20	21	22
23	24	25	26	27	28	29
30

In the Roman Rite of the Catholic Church, the Roman Martyrology is a directory of liturgical commemorations for each day of the year. There are two editions of the Martyrology currently authorized for use: the 2004 edition (the most recent) and the 1960 revision of the 1956 edition (as permitted under Summorum Pontificum). The following commemorations are listed for November 3 in each respective edition:

== Ordinary form (2004 edition) ==
=== General calendar ===
- Memorial of St. Martin de Porres OP, Religious

=== Martyrology only ===
- Sts. Germanus, Theophilus, and Cyril, Martyrs
- St. Libertine, Bishop of Agrigento and Martyr
- St. Papulus, Martyr
- Sts. Valentine, Priest, and Hilary, Deacon, Martyrs of Viterbo
- St. Gwenhael, Abbot
- St. Sylvia, mother of Pope St. Gregory the Great
- St. Pirmin, Bishop and Abbot of Augia
- St. Joannicius, Hermit
- St. Odrada of Alem, Virgin
- St. Ermengol, Bishop of Urgell
- St. Berardo, Bishop of Marsi
- Bl. Alpaïs of Cudot, Virgin
- St. Ida of Toggenburg, Hermitess
- Bl. Simon Ballachi OP, Religious
- St. Charles Borromeo (Note: The Martyrology also commemorates St. Charles Borromeo on the next day, November 4, his feast day in the General Roman Calendar.), Bishop of Milan
- St. Peter Francis Néron MEP, Priest and Martyr of Vietnam

== Extraordinary form (1960 edition) ==
- St. Charles Borromeo, Cardinal, Bishop of Milan, and Confessor
- St. Quartus, New Testament disciple
- Sts. Valentine, Priest, and Hilary, Deacon, Martyrs of Viterbo under Maximian
- Sts. Germanus, Theophilus, Caesarius, and Vitalis, Martyrs under Decius
- Martyrs of Saragossa under Dacian
- St. Winifred, Virgin and Martyr
- St. Malachy, Bishop of Connor
- St. Hubert, Bishop of Tongeren (now Liège)
- St. Domninus, Bishop of Vienne
- St. Pirmin, Bishop of Meaux
- St. Ermengol, Bishop of Urgell
- St. Sylvia, mother of Pope St. Gregory the Great

== See also ==
- November 3 (Eastern Orthodox liturgics)

== Sources ==
=== 2004 edition ===
- Martyrologium Romanum (in Latin) (2nd ed.). Vatican City: Libreria Editrice Vaticana. 2004. pp. 603–605.

=== 1960 edition ===
- Martyrologium Romanum (in Latin) (revised post-typical 4th ed.). Justitias Books. 2017 [1956 with 1960 revisions]. pp. 270–271.
- The Roman Martyrology. Translated by O'Connell, Canon J.B. (revised post-typical 4th ed.). Westminster: Newman Press. 1962. p. 240.
