= November 9 in the Roman Martyrology =

<<	November					>>
Su	Mo	Tu	We	Th	Fr	Sa
						1
2	3	4	5	6	7	8
9	10	11	12	13	14	15
16	17	18	19	20	21	22
23	24	25	26	27	28	29
30

In the Roman Rite of the Catholic Church, the Roman Martyrology is a directory of liturgical commemorations for each day of the year. There are two editions of the Martyrology currently authorized for use: the 2004 edition (the most recent) and the 1960 revision of the 1956 edition (as permitted under Summorum Pontificum). The following commemorations are listed for November 9 in each respective edition:

== Ordinary form (2004 edition) ==
=== General calendar ===
- Feast of the Dedication of the Lateran Basilica

=== Martyrology only ===
- St. Ursin, first Bishop of Bourges
- St. Agrippinus, Bishop of Naples
- St. Vanne, Bishop of Verdun
- Sts. Eustolia and Sopatra of Constantinople, Virgins
- St. George, Bishop of Lodève
- Bl. Joan of Signa, Virgin
- Bl. Gabriel Ferretti OFM, Priest
- Bl. Ludovico Morbioli
- Bl. Gratia of Kotor, Religious
- Bl. George Napper, Priest and Martyr
- St. Elizabeth (of the Most Holy Trinity) Catez OCD, (Note: The 2004 edition lists her as a Blessed. She was canonized in 2016.) Virgin
- Bl. Henryk Hlebowicz, Priest and Martyr
- Bl. Luigi Beltrame Quattrocchi

== Extraordinary form (1960 edition) ==
=== General calendar ===
- Feast of the Dedication of the Basilica of the Savior
- Commemoration of St. Theodore, Martyr of Amasea under Maximian

=== Martyrology only ===
- St. Orestes, Martyr of Tyana under Diocletian
- St. Alexander, Martyr of Thessalonica under Maximian
- St. Ursin, Confessor and first Bishop of Bourges
- St. Agrippinus, Bishop of Naples
- Sts. Eustolia and Sopatra of Constantinople, Virgins
- The Miraculous Image of the Savior at Beirut (Note: The full Martyrology entry reads: "At Beyrouth in Syria, the commemoration of the Image of the Saviour, which when crucified by the Jews poured forth blood so plenteously that the churches of the East and West drew copiously from it.")

== See also ==
- November 9 (Eastern Orthodox liturgics)

== Sources ==
=== 2004 edition ===
- Martyrologium Romanum (in Latin) (2nd ed.). Vatican City: Libreria Editrice Vaticana. 2004. pp. 613–614.

=== 1960 edition ===
- Martyrologium Romanum (in Latin) (revised post-typical 4th ed.). Justitias Books. 2017 [1956 with 1960 revisions]. p. 275.
- The Roman Martyrology. Translated by O'Connell, Canon J.B. (revised post-typical 4th ed.). Westminster: Newman Press. 1962. pp. 244–245.
