= November 4 in the Roman Martyrology =

<<	November					>>
Su	Mo	Tu	We	Th	Fr	Sa
						1
2	3	4	5	6	7	8
9	10	11	12	13	14	15
16	17	18	19	20	21	22
23	24	25	26	27	28	29
30

In the Roman Rite of the Catholic Church, the Roman Martyrology is a directory of liturgical commemorations for each day of the year. There are two editions of the Martyrology currently authorized for use: the 2004 edition (the most recent) and the 1960 revision of the 1956 edition (as permitted under Summorum Pontificum). The following commemorations are listed for November 4 in each respective edition:

== Ordinary form (2004 edition) ==
=== General calendar ===
- Memorial of St. Charles Borromeo, Bishop of Milan

=== Martyrology only ===
- Sts. Vitalis and Agricola, Martyrs of Bologna
- Sts. Nicander, Bishop, and Hermas, Priest, Martyrs of Myra
- St. Pierius of Alexandria, Priest
- St. Amantius, Bishop of Rodez
- St. Perpetuus, Bishop of Maastricht
- St. Modesta, Abbess of Oeren
- St. Emeric, son of St. Stephen of Hungary
- Bl. Helen Enselmini OSC, Virgin
- St. Felix of Valois, Hermit
- Bl. Françoise d'Amboise OCarm, Religious

== Extraordinary form (1960 edition) ==
=== General calendar ===
- Feast of St. Charles Borromeo, Cardinal, Bishop of Milan, and Confessor
- Commemoration of Sts. Vitalis and Agricola, Martyrs of Bologna

=== Martyrology only ===
- St. Felix of Valois (Note: His feast is celebrated on November 20 in the General Roman Calendar of the Extraordinary Form.), Confessor
- Sts. Philologus and Patrobus, disciples of St. Paul
- St. Proculus, Bishop of Autun and Martyr
- Sts. Nicander, Bishop, and Hermas, Priest, Martyrs of Myra under the governor Libanius
- St. Clair, Priest and Martyr of Vexin
- St. Porphyrius, Martyr of Ephesus under Aurelian
- St. Amantius, Bishop of Rodez
- St. Pierius of Alexandria, Priest
- St. Joannicius, Abbot
- St. Emeric, Confessor, son of St. Stephen of Hungary

== See also ==
- November 4 (Eastern Orthodox liturgics)

== Sources ==
=== 2004 edition ===
- Martyrologium Romanum (in Latin) (2nd ed.). Vatican City: Libreria Editrice Vaticana. 2004. pp. 605–607.

=== 1960 edition ===
- Martyrologium Romanum (in Latin) (revised post-typical 4th ed.). Justitias Books. 2017 [1956 with 1960 revisions]. pp. 271–272.
- The Roman Martyrology. Translated by O'Connell, Canon J.B. (revised post-typical 4th ed.). Westminster: Newman Press. 1962. pp. 240–241.
