= November 10 in the Roman Martyrology =

<<	November					>>
Su	Mo	Tu	We	Th	Fr	Sa
						1
2	3	4	5	6	7	8
9	10	11	12	13	14	15
16	17	18	19	20	21	22
23	24	25	26	27	28	29
30

In the Roman Rite of the Catholic Church, the Roman Martyrology is a directory of liturgical commemorations for each day of the year. There are two editions of the Martyrology currently authorized for use: the 2004 edition (the most recent) and the 1960 revision of the 1956 edition (as permitted under Summorum Pontificum). The following commemorations are listed for November 10 in each respective edition:

== Ordinary form (2004 edition) ==
=== General calendar ===
- Memorial of Pope St. Leo I (the Great), Doctor of the Church

=== Martyrology only ===
- Sts. Demetrius, Bishop of Antioch (died in exile under Shapur I)
- St. Orestes, Martyr of Tyana
- St. Probus, Bishop of Ravenna
- Sts. Nerses, Bishop, and Joseph, his disciple, Martyrs of Persia under Shapur II
- St. Justus, Bishop and Missionary
- St. Baudolino, Hermit of Villa del Foro
- St. Andrew Avellino CR, Priest
- Bl. Acisclo Piña Piazuelo OH, Religious and Martyr

== Extraordinary form (1960 edition) ==
=== General calendar ===
- St. Andrew Avellino CR, Confessor
- Commemoration of Sts. Trypho, Respicius, and Nympha, Martyrs

=== Martyrology only ===
- Pope St. Leo I (the Great), (Note: His feast is celebrated on April 11 in the General Roman Calendar of the Extraordinary Form.) Confessor and Doctor of the Church
- Sts. Tryphenna and Tryphosa, disciples of Sts. Paul and Thecla
- Sts. Demetrius, Bishop, Anian, Deacon, Eustosius, and 20 companions, Martyrs of Antioch
- Sts. Tiberius, Modestus, and Florence, Martyrs of Agde under Diocletian
- St. Probus, Bishop of Ravenna
- St. Monitor, Bishop of Orléans and Confessor
- St. Justus, Bishop and Missionary
- St. Leo of Melun, Confessor
- St. Theoktiste of Paros, Virgin

== See also ==
- November 10 (Eastern Orthodox liturgics)

== Sources ==
=== 2004 edition ===
- Martyrologium Romanum (in Latin) (2nd ed.). Vatican City: Libreria Editrice Vaticana. 2004. pp. 615–616.

=== 1960 edition ===
- Martyrologium Romanum (in Latin) (revised post-typical 4th ed.). Justitias Books. 2017 [1956 with 1960 revisions]. p. 276.
- The Roman Martyrology. Translated by O'Connell, Canon J.B. (revised post-typical 4th ed.). Westminster: Newman Press. 1962. p. 245.
