= November 6 in the Roman Martyrology =

Date in Roman Martyrology

<<	November					>>
Su	Mo	Tu	We	Th	Fr	Sa
						1
2	3	4	5	6	7	8
9	10	11	12	13	14	15
16	17	18	19	20	21	22
23	24	25	26	27	28	29
30

In the Roman Rite of the Catholic Church, the Roman Martyrology is a directory of liturgical commemorations for each day of the year. There are two editions of the Martyrology currently authorized for use: the 2004 edition (the most recent) and the 1960 revision of the 1956 edition (as permitted under Summorum Pontificum). The following commemorations are listed for November 6 in each respective edition:

== Ordinary form (2004 edition) ==
- St. Felix, Martyr of Thinisa
- St. Paul, Bishop of Constantinople and Martyr
- St. Melaine, Bishop of Rennes
- St. Illtud, Abbot of Llanilltud Fawr
- St. Leonard of Limoges, Hermit
- Sts. Callinicus, Himerius, Theodore, Stephen, Peter, Paul, Theodore, John, John, and companions, (Note: This list includes two persons named Theodore and two persons named John.) Martyrs of Jerusalem
- St. Severus, Bishop of Barcelona and Martyr
- St. Protasius, Bishop of Lausanne
- St. Winnoc, Abbot of Wormhout
- St. Stephen, Bishop of Apt
- St. Theobald of Dorat, Priest
- Bl. Christina of Stommeln, Virgin

== Extraordinary form (1960 edition) ==
- St. Severus, Bishop of Barcelona and Martyr
- St. Felix, Martyr of Thinisa
- 10 Martyrs of Theopolis under the Saracens
- St. Atticus, Martyr of Phrygia
- Burial of St. Winnoc, Abbot, at Bergues
- St. Felix of Fondi, Monk
- St. Leonard of Limoges, Confessor

== See also ==
- November 6 (Eastern Orthodox liturgics)

== Sources ==
=== 2004 edition ===
- Martyrologium Romanum (in Latin) (2nd ed.). Vatican City: Libreria Editrice Vaticana. 2004. pp. 609–610.

=== 1960 edition ===
- Martyrologium Romanum (in Latin) (revised post-typical 4th ed.). Justitias Books. 2017 [1956 with 1960 revisions]. p. 273.
- The Roman Martyrology. Translated by O'Connell, Canon J.B. (revised post-typical 4th ed.). Westminster: Newman Press. 1962. p. 242.
