= November 2 in the Roman Martyrology =

<<	November					>>
Su	Mo	Tu	We	Th	Fr	Sa
1	2	3	4	5	6	7
8	9	10	11	12	13	14
15	16	17	18	19	20	21
22	23	24	25	26	27	28
29	30

In the Roman Rite of the Catholic Church, the Roman Martyrology is a directory of liturgical commemorations for each day of the year. There are two editions of the Martyrology currently authorized for use: the 2004 edition (the most recent) and the 1960 revision of the 1956 edition (as permitted under Summorum Pontificum). The following commemorations are listed for November 2 in each respective edition:

== Ordinary form (2004 edition) ==
=== General calendar ===
- Commemoration of All the Faithful Departed (All Souls' Day)

=== Martyrology only ===
- St. Victorinus of Pettau, Bishop and Martyr under Diocletian
- St. Justus of Trieste, Martyr
- Sts. Carterius, Styriacus, Tobias, Eudoxius, Agapius, and companions, Martyrs of Sebaste under Licinius
- Sts. Acindynus, Pegasius, Aphthonius, Elpidephorus, Anempodistus, and companions, Martyrs of Persia under King Shapur
- St. Domninus, Bishop of Vienne
- St. Marcian of Cyrus, Hermit
- St. Ambrose of Agaune, Abbot
- St. Winifred, Virgin
- St. George of Vienne, Bishop
- St. Malachy, Bishop of Down and Connor
- Bl. Margaret of Lorraine, Religious
- Bl. John Bodey, Martyr
- Bl. Pius of Saint Aloysius CP, Religious

== Extraordinary form (1960 edition) ==
=== General calendar ===
- Commemoration of All the Faithful Departed (All Souls' Day)

=== Martyrology only ===
- St. Victorinus of Pettau, Bishop and Martyr under Diocletian
- St. Justus of Trieste, Martyr
- Sts. Carterius, Styriacus, Tobias, Eudoxius, Agapius, and companions, Martyrs of Sebaste under Licinius
- Sts. Acindynus, Pegasius, Aphthonius, Elpidephorus, Anempodistus, and companions, Martyrs of Persia
- Sts. Publius, Victor, Hermes, and Papias, Martyrs of Africa
- St. Eustochium of Tarsus, Virgin and Martyr under Julian the Apostate
- St. Theodotus of Laodicea, Bishop
- St. George of Vienne, Bishop
- St. Ambrose of Agaune, Abbot
- St. Marcian of Cyrus, Confessor

== See also ==
- November 2 (Eastern Orthodox liturgics)

== Sources ==
=== 2004 edition ===
- Martyrologium Romanum (in Latin) (2nd ed.). Vatican City: Libreria Editrice Vaticana. 2004. pp. 602–603.

=== 1960 edition ===
- Martyrologium Romanum (in Latin) (revised post-typical 4th ed.). Justitias Books. 2017 [1956 with 1960 revisions]. pp. 269–270.
- The Roman Martyrology. Translated by O'Connell, Canon J.B. (revised post-typical 4th ed.). Westminster: Newman Press. 1962. p. 239.
