= November 12 in the Roman Martyrology =

| << | November | | | | | >> |
| Su | Mo | Tu | We | Th | Fr | Sa |
| | | | | | | 1 |
| 2 | 3 | 4 | 5 | 6 | 7 | 8 |
| 9 | 10 | 11 | 12 | 13 | 14 | 15 |
| 16 | 17 | 18 | 19 | 20 | 21 | 22 |
| 23 | 24 | 25 | 26 | 27 | 28 | 29 |
| 30 |

In the Roman Rite of the Catholic Church, the Roman Martyrology is a directory of liturgical commemorations for each day of the year. There are two editions of the Martyrology currently authorized for use: the 2004 edition (the most recent) and the 1960 revision of the 1956 edition (as permitted under Summorum Pontificum). The following commemorations are listed for November 12 in each respective edition:

== Ordinary form (2004 edition) ==
=== General calendar ===
- Memorial of St. Josaphat Kuncewicz, Bishop of Polotsk and Martyr of Vitebsk

=== Martyrology only ===
- St. Nilus of Ankara, Abbot
- St. Machar, Bishop of Mull, disciple of St. Columba
- St. Hesychius, Bishop of Vienne, father of Sts. Apollinaris (October 5) and Avitus (February 5)
- St. Emilian of Cogolla, Priest
- St. Cunibert, Bishop of Cologne
- St. Lebuinus of Deventer, Priest
- Sts. Benedict, John, Matthew, Isaac, and Christian, Hermits and Martyrs of Kazimierz (Note: This could be Kaźmierz or Kazimierz Biskupi; the exact location is unknown.)
- Bl. John Cini (John of Peace) TOR, Hermit of Pisa
- St. Didacus of Alcalá OFM, Religious
- St. Margarito Flores, Priest and Martyr of Mexico
- Bl. Joseph Medes Ferrís, Martyr of Valencia

== Extraordinary form (1960 edition) ==
=== General calendar ===
- Feast of St. Martin I, (Note: The 1960 edition also commemorates Pope St. Martin I on September 16. In the 2004 edition, his memorial is on April 13.) Pope and Martyr

=== Martyrology only ===
- St. Josaphat OSBM, (Note: His feast is celebrated two days later, on November 14, in the General Roman Calendar of the Extraordinary Form.) Bishop of Polotsk and Martyr of Vitebsk
- St. Didacus of Alcalá OFM, (Note: His feast is celebrated the next day, November 13, in the General Roman Calendar of the Extraordinary Form.) Confessor
- Sts. Aurelius and Publius, Bishops and Martyrs of Asia
- St. Livinus, Bishop and Martyr of Essche
- Sts. Benedict, John, Matthew, Isaac, and Christian, Hermits and Martyrs of Kazimierz
- St. Paternus, Monk and Martyr of Sergines
- St. Rufus, first Bishop of Avignon
- St. Cunibert, Bishop of Cologne
- St. Emilian, Priest of Tarazona
- St. Nilus of Constantinople, Abbot

== See also ==
- November 12 (Eastern Orthodox liturgics)

== Sources ==
=== 2004 edition ===
- Martyrologium Romanum (in Latin) (2nd ed.). Vatican City: Libreria Editrice Vaticana. 2004. pp. 618–619.

=== 1960 edition ===
- Martyrologium Romanum (in Latin) (revised post-typical 4th ed.). Justitias Books. 2017 [1956 with 1960 revisions]. p. 278.
- The Roman Martyrology. Translated by O'Connell, Canon J.B. (revised post-typical 4th ed.). Westminster: Newman Press. 1962. pp. 246–247.
