= November 8 in the Roman Martyrology =

<<	November					>>
Su	Mo	Tu	We	Th	Fr	Sa
1	2	3	4	5	6	7
8	9	10	11	12	13	14
15	16	17	18	19	20	21
22	23	24	25	26	27	28
29	30

In the Roman Rite of the Catholic Church, the Roman Martyrology is a directory of liturgical commemorations for each day of the year. There are two editions of the Martyrology currently authorized for use: the 2004 edition (the most recent) and the 1960 revision of the 1956 edition (as permitted under Summorum Pontificum). The following commemorations are listed for November 8 in each respective edition:

== Ordinary form (2004 edition) ==
- Sts. Symphorian, Claudius, Nicostratus, Castorius, and Simplicius of Sirmium, Martyrs under Diocletian
- St. Clair of Tours, Priest, disciple of St. Martin of Tours
- St. Deusdedit I, Pope
- St. Willehad, first Bishop of Bremen
- St. Godfrey, Bishop of Amiens
- Bl. John Duns Scotus OFM, Priest
- Bl. Maria Crucified (Elizabeth Maria) Satellico OSC, Abbess
- Sts. Joseph Nguyễn Đình Nghi, Paul Nguyễn Ngân, Martin Tạ Đức Thịnh, Priests, and Martin Thọ and John Baptist Cỏn, Martyrs of Vietnam under Thiệu Trị

== Extraordinary form (1960 edition) ==
=== General calendar ===
- Commemoration of the Four Crowned Martyrs
  - Sts. Claudius, Nicostratus, Symphorian, Castorius, and Simplicius, Martyrs of Rome under Diocletian
  - Sts. Severus, Severian, Carpophorus, and Victorinus, Martyrs of Rome

=== Martyrology only ===
- St. Deusdedit I, Pope
- St. Willehad, first Bishop of Bremen, disciple of St. Boniface
- St. Godfrey, Bishop of Amiens
- St. Maur, Bishop of Verdun and Confessor
- St. Clair of Tours, Priest

== See also ==
- November 8 (Eastern Orthodox liturgics)

== Sources ==
=== 2004 edition ===
- Martyrologium Romanum (in Latin) (2nd ed.). Vatican City: Libreria Editrice Vaticana. 2004. pp. 612–613.

=== 1960 edition ===
- Martyrologium Romanum (in Latin) (revised post-typical 4th ed.). Justitias Books. 2017 [1956 with 1960 revisions]. pp. 274–275.
- The Roman Martyrology. Translated by O'Connell, Canon J.B. (revised post-typical 4th ed.). Westminster: Newman Press. 1962. pp. 243–244.
