= November 5 in the Roman Martyrology =

<<	November					>>
Su	Mo	Tu	We	Th	Fr	Sa
						1
2	3	4	5	6	7	8
9	10	11	12	13	14	15
16	17	18	19	20	21	22
23	24	25	26	27	28	29
30

In the Roman Rite of the Catholic Church, the Roman Martyrology is a directory of liturgical commemorations for each day of the year. There are two editions of the Martyrology currently authorized for use: the 2004 edition (the most recent) and the 1960 revision of the 1956 edition (as permitted under Summorum Pontificum). The following commemorations are listed for November 5 in each respective edition:

== Ordinary form (2004 edition) ==
- St. Domninus, Martyr of Caesarea under Diocletian
- Sts. Theotimos, Philotheos, Timothy, and Auxentius, Martyrs of Caesarea
- St. Mark, Bishop of Aeca
- St. Fibicius, Bishop of Trier
- St. Guethnoc, brother of Sts. Winwaloe (March 3) and Jacut (February 8)
- St. Bertilla, Abbess of Chelles
- St. Gerald, Bishop of Béziers
- Bl. Gomidas Keumurjian (also known as Cosmas da Carboniam), Priest and Martyr of Constantinople
- St. Dominic Mậu OP, Priest and Martyr of Vietnam
- St. Guido Maria Conforti, (Note: The 2004 edition lists him as a Blessed. He was canonized in 2011.) Bishop of Parma, Founder of the Xaverian Missionaries
- Bl. Juan Antonio Burró Más OH, Religious and Martyr of Spain
- Bl. María del Carmen Viel Ferrando, Virgin and Martyr of Valencia
- Bl. Bernhard Lichtenberg, Priest and Martyr (killed en route to Dachau)
- Bl. Hryhoriy Lakota, Auxiliary Bishop of Przemyśl and Martyr at Abez

== Extraordinary form (1960 edition) ==
- Sts. Zechariah and Elizabeth, parents of St. John the Baptist
- Sts. Felix, Priest, and Eusebius, Monk, Martyrs of Terracina (Note: These martyrs are associated with other martyrs of Terracina, Sts. Caesarius and Julian, commemorated on November 1. The Martyrology recounts that Eusebius was arrested after having buried Caesarius and Julian, and he, together with Felix, was imprisoned and beheaded.)
- Sts. Galation and Episteme (married couple), Martyrs of Emesa
- Sts. Domninus, Theotimos, Philotheos, Silvanus, and companions, Martyrs under Maximin
- St. Magnus, Bishop of Milan and Confessor
- St. Dominator, Bishop of Brescia
- St. Fibicius, Bishop of Trier
- St. Lié of Orléans, Priest and Confessor

== See also ==
- November 5 (Eastern Orthodox liturgics)

== Sources ==
=== 2004 edition ===
- Martyrologium Romanum (in Latin) (2nd ed.). Vatican City: Libreria Editrice Vaticana. 2004. pp. 607–608.

=== 1960 edition ===
- Martyrologium Romanum (in Latin) (revised post-typical 4th ed.). Justitias Books. 2017 [1956 with 1960 revisions]. p. 272.
- The Roman Martyrology. Translated by O'Connell, Canon J.B. (revised post-typical 4th ed.). Westminster: Newman Press. 1962. pp. 241–242.
