= November 11 in the Roman Martyrology =

<<	November					>>
Su	Mo	Tu	We	Th	Fr	Sa
1	2	3	4	5	6	7
8	9	10	11	12	13	14
15	16	17	18	19	20	21
22	23	24	25	26	27	28
29	30

In the Roman Rite of the Catholic Church, the Roman Martyrology is a directory of liturgical commemorations for each day of the year. There are two editions of the Martyrology currently authorized for use: the 2004 edition (the most recent) and the 1960 revision of the 1956 edition (as permitted under Summorum Pontificum). The following commemorations are listed for November 11 in each respective edition:

== Ordinary form (2004 edition) ==
=== General calendar ===
- Memorial of St. Martin, Bishop of Tours

=== Martyrology only ===
- St. Menas, Martyr of Egypt
- St. Veranus, Bishop of Vence
- St. Menas, Hermit of Samnium
- St. John the Merciful, Bishop of Alexandria
- St. Bertuin, Bishop and Abbot of Malonne
- St. Theodore, Abbot of Stoudios
- St. Bartholomew, Abbot of Grottaferrata
- St. Marina of Omura, Virgin and Martyr of Nagasaki
- Bl. Alicia Kotowska CR, Virgin and Martyr of Piaśnica
- Bl. Vincent Eugene Bossilkov CP, Bishop of Nicopolis and Martyr of Sofia

== Extraordinary form (1960 edition) ==
=== General calendar ===
- Feast of St. Martin, Bishop of Tours and Confessor
- Commemoration of St. Menas, Martyr of Cotyaeum under Diocletian

=== Martyrology only ===
- Sts. Valentine, Felician, and Victorinus, Martyrs of Ravenna under Diocletian
- St. Athenodorus, Martyr of Mesopotamia under Diocletian and Governor Eleusius
- St. Veranus of Lyon, Bishop
- St. Theodore, Abbot of Stoudios
- St. Bartholomew, Abbot of Grottaferrata
- St. Menas, Hermit of Samnium

== See also ==
- November 11 (Eastern Orthodox liturgics)

== Sources ==
=== 2004 edition ===
- Martyrologium Romanum (in Latin) (2nd ed.). Vatican City: Libreria Editrice Vaticana. 2004. pp. 616–617.

=== 1960 edition ===
- Martyrologium Romanum (in Latin) (revised post-typical 4th ed.). Justitias Books. 2017 [1956 with 1960 revisions]. p. 277.
- The Roman Martyrology. Translated by O'Connell, Canon J.B. (revised post-typical 4th ed.). Westminster: Newman Press. 1962. p. 246.
