= Tryphaena (disambiguation) =

Tryphaena or Tryphena may refer to:

== Tryphaena ==
- Tryphaena (ca 141 BC – 111 BC), Ptolemaic princess, wife of Antiochus VIII Grypus, queen of Syria
- Saint Tryphaena of Cyzicus (fl. 1st century AD), Roman Christian martyr
- Crepereia Tryphaena, Roman woman discovered with grave goods in 1889
- Tryphaena Cleopatraina may refer to:
  - Cleopatra V Tryphaena
  - Cleopatra VI Tryphaena
- Antonia Tryphaena (10 BC – 55), Queen of Thrace, likely the basis of Tryphena in Romans and in The Acts of Thecla and Paul
- Tryphaena, a character in the Satyricon of Petronius

== Tryphena ==
- Tryphena and Tryphosa, women mentioned in Romans 16
- Tryphena Anderson (born 1933), Jamaican-British nurse, the first black health visitor in the United Kingdom
- Tryphena Sparks (1851–1890), a cousin and possible lover of Thomas Hardy
- Tryphena, New Zealand, a town in New Zealand
