= November 1 (Eastern Orthodox liturgics) =

Day in the Eastern Orthodox liturgical calendar

Eastern Orthodox liturgical calendar
October 31	November 1	November 2
November 1 O.S. ≍ November 14 N.S. November 1 N.S ≍ October 19 O.S.

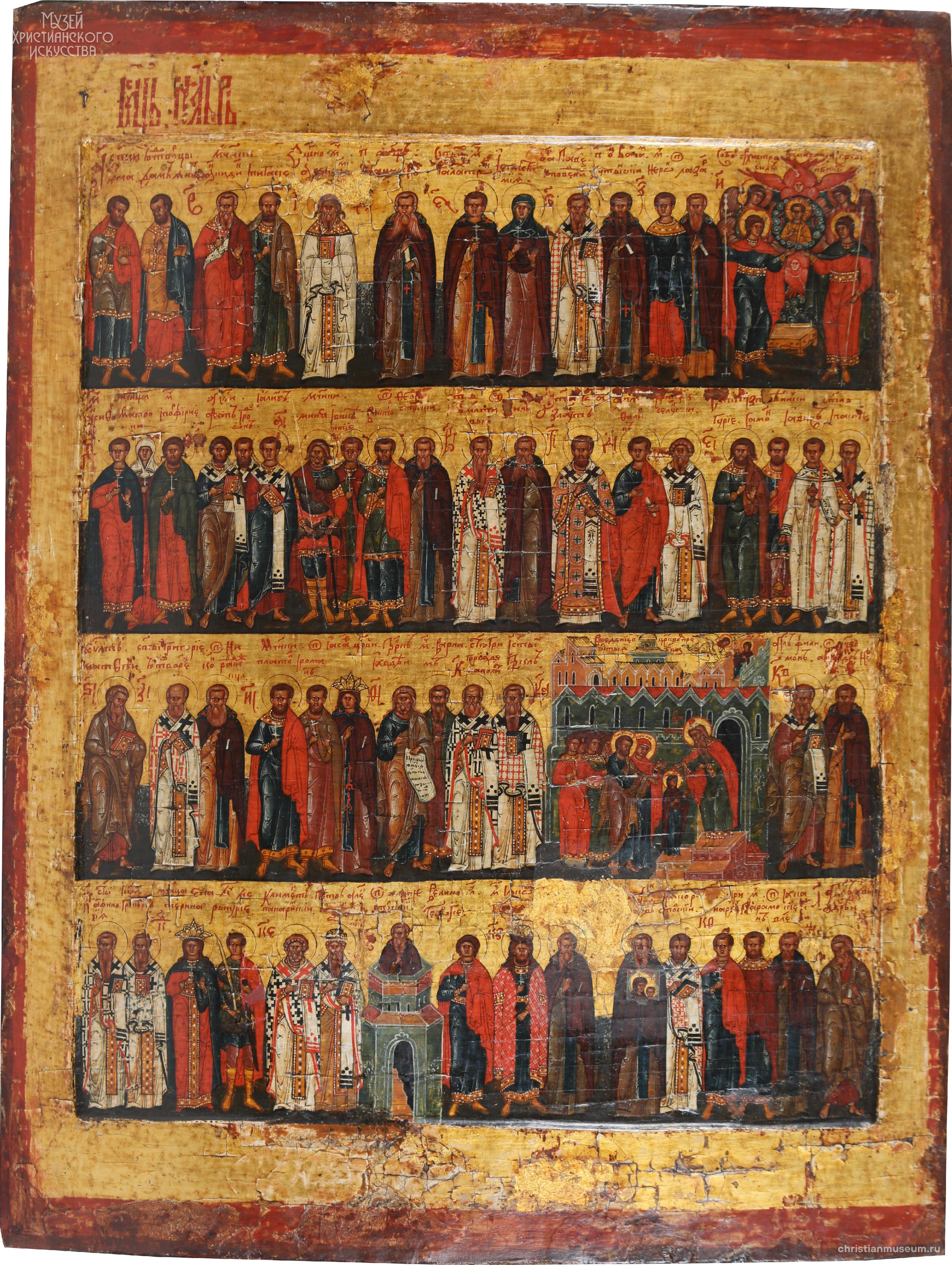
Menaion calendar icon: November. One day = one saint

November 1 in Eastern Orthodox liturgical calendars is a feast day and a day of commemoration of saints and martyrs. Although some Orthodox churches use the Revised Julian Calendar and others use the traditional Julian calendar, the fixed commemorations for their respective November 1 are broadly the same, no matter which calendar is used. (Note: Despite the dates being the same, the days to which they refer typically differ by 13 days. The notation Old Style or O.S. is sometimes used to indicate a date in the traditional Julian Calendar (the "Old Calendar"). The notation New Style or N.S. indicates a date in the Revised Julian calendar (the "New Calendar").)

== Saints ==
- Holy Wonderworkers and Unmercenaries Cosmas and Damian of Mesopotamia and their mother Venerable Theodota of Mesopotamia (c. 287) (Note: The Unmercenary Saints Cosmas and Damian of Asia Minor should not be confused with the Unmercenary Saints Cosmas and Damian of Rome (July 1), or the Unmercenary Saints Cosmas and Damian of Arabia (October 17).)
- Martyrs Cyrenia (Kyriaina) and Juliana in Cilicia (305)
- Hieromartyrs John the Bishop and James the Presbyter of Persia (345)
- Martyrs Caesarius, Dacius, Sabbas, Sabinian, Agrippa, Adrian, and Thomas at Damascus (7th century) (Note: "At Damascus, the martyrdom of the Saints Caesarius, Dacius and five others.")
- Saint Theolepte, martyr. (Note: Mentioned in Parisian Codex 259, sheet 2a.)
- Martyrs Cyprian and Juliana (Note: "At Tarsus, the Saints Cyrenia and Juliana, under the emperor Maximian.")

== Pre-Schism Western saints ==
- Martyr Mary the Slave Girl (c. 117–138) (Note: "The same day, St. Mary, handmaid. Accused of professing the Christian religion, in the time of the emperor Adrian, she was subjected to cruel scourging, to torture on the rack, and the lacerating of her body with iron hooks, and thus completed her martyrdom.")
- Saint Austromoine (Austremonius, Stremoine), first Bishop of Clermont-Ferrand and "Apostle of Auvergne" (c. 250)
- Saint Benignus of Dijon, Priest and Apostle, of Burgundy (c. 272) (Note: "At Dijon, St. Benignus, a priest, who was sent to France by blessed Polycarp to preach the Gospel. After he had been subjected to many most grievous torments, by the judge Terentius, under the emperor Marcus Aurelius, he was finally condemned to have his neck struck with an iron bar and his body pierced with a lance.")
- Martyrs Caesarius, a Deacon of Africa, together with Julian, a local presbyter, martyred at Terracina in Italy (c. 284–305) (Note: "At Terracina, in Campania, the birthday of St. Caesarius, deacon, who was for many days detained in prison, afterwards put into a sack with St. Julian, priest, and then precipitated into the sea.")
- Saint Maturinus (Mathurin), confessor, French exorcist and missionary, apostle and patron of Gâtinais (c. 300)
- Saint Marcellus, 9th Bishop of Paris (c. 430)
- Saint Amabilis of Riom (475)
- Saint Cledwyn (Clydwyn), patron saint of Llangedwyn in Clwyd in Wales (5th century)
- Saint Pabiali of Wales, patron-saint of Partypallai in Wales (5th/6th century) (Note: See also: Peibio Clafrog.)
- Saint Dingad of Llandingat (5th century)
- Saint Magnus of Milan (530)
- Saint Vigor, disciple of St Vedast, became Bishop of Bayeux, resolutely opposed paganism (c. 537)
- Martyr Hermeningild the Goth, Prince of Spain (586)
- Saint Gwythian (Gothian, Gocianus) of Cornwall (6th century)
- Saint Cadfan, Abbot of Tywyn and Bardsey (6th century)
- Saint Caillin, a disciple of St Aidan of Ferns in Ireland (6th century)
- Saint Ceitho, one of five brothers, all saints in Wales (6th century)
- Saint Licinius of Angers (Lesin, Lezin), chosen Bishop of Angers in 586 and consecrated by St Gregory of Tours (c. 616) (see also: February 13)
- Saint Caesarius, Bishop of Clermont in France (c. 627)
- Saint Floribert (Florbert), Abbot of monasteries in Ghent, Mont-Blandin and Saint-Bavon in Belgium (c. 660)
- Saint Genesius of Lyon (c. 679)
- Saint Severinus, a monk who lived as a hermit in Tivoli in Italy (c. 699) (Note: His relics are in the church of St Laurence in Tivoli.)
- Saint Germanus of Montfort, born in Montfort in France, became a monk at the monastery of Savigny, reposed as a hermit (c. 906–1000)

== Post-Schism Orthodox saints ==
- Venerable James of Mount Athos and his two disciples James the Deacon and Dionysius the Monk (1520)
- Venerable Saint David of Euboea (1589) (see also: August 7)
- New Virgin-Martyr Helen of Sinope (18th century)

=== New martyrs and confessors ===
- Martyrs David Megas Komnenos, last Emperor of Trebizond, with his sons Basil, George, and Manouel (Manuel), and his nephew Alexios (1463)
- Hieromartyrs Alexander (Smirnov), and Theodore (Remezov), Priests (1918)
- New Hieromartyr Sergius (Zverev), Archbishop of Elets and Melitopol (1937) (Note: See also: (in Russian) Сергий (Зверев). Википедии. (Russian Wikipedia).)
- New Hieromartyr Alexander Shalay, Priest (1937)
- New Hieromartyr Demetrius (Ovechkin), Priest of Perm (1937)
- Virgin-martyr Elizabeth Samovskoy (1937)
- Martyr Peter Ignatov (1941)

== Other commemorations ==
- Translation of the relics of Boniface, enlightener of Germany (755)
- Repose of Elder Hilarion of Valaam and Sarov (1841) (Note: "A close disciple of Elder Naz-arius and his beloved cell-attendant during Naz-arius' stay as a recluse in the wilderness of Valaam, Fr. Hilarion accompanied him also to Sarov Monastery, where he was to defend St. Seraphim's orphans to such an extent that he was even banished for several years from Sarov. St. Seraphim had all the nuns of his Diveyevo Convent tonsured only by Fr. Hilarion, who was also to lay the beginning of St. Seraphim's glorification, finding his own final resting place near those of St. Seraphim and his beloved Abbot Nazarius. Elder Hilarion was a writer and left a brief "Ladder of Divine Ascent" which was published together with the Counsels of Abbot Nazarius. Since the latter did not know how to write, Fr. Hilarion took down Nazarius' teachings. The engraving on the left is taken from the Sarov Patericon which, although regrettably brief, nevertheless shows clearly that the Paisian influence upon Russia did not fall on barren ground. There were deep spiritual currents that consciously preserved me national holiness of St. Tikhon of Zadonsk and the Elders of the Roslavl and Sarov forests and welcomed the Athonite spirit which came from Moldavia.")

== Icon gallery ==
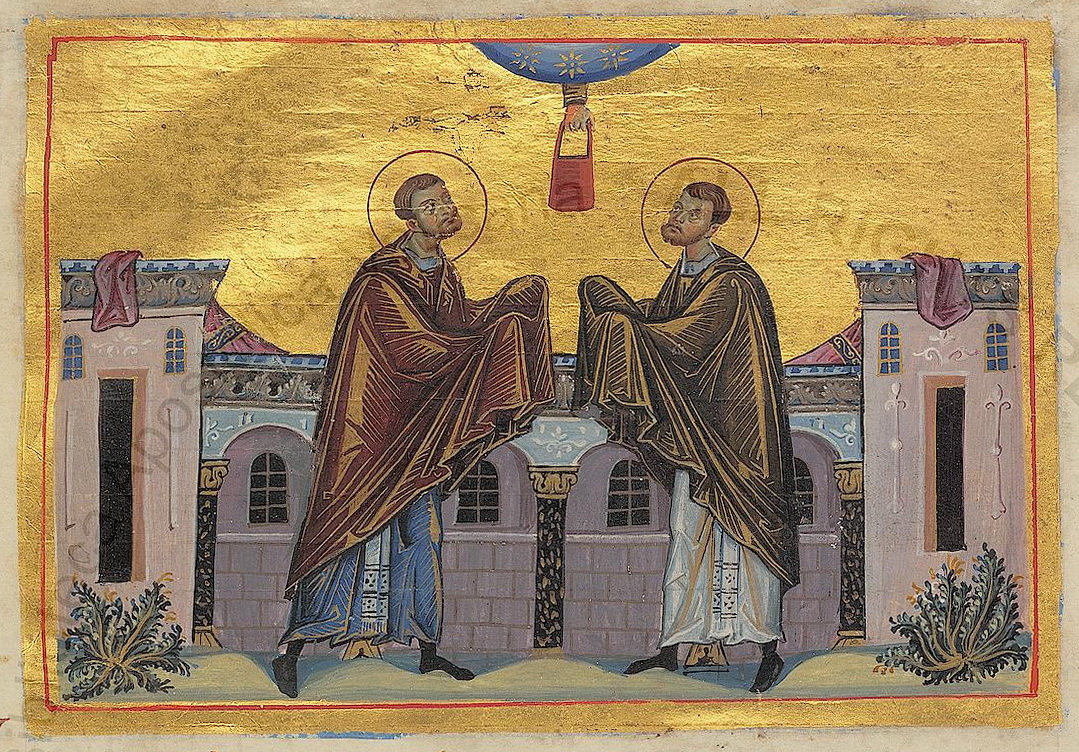
Sts. Cosmas and Damian.
(Menologion of Basil II, 10th century).

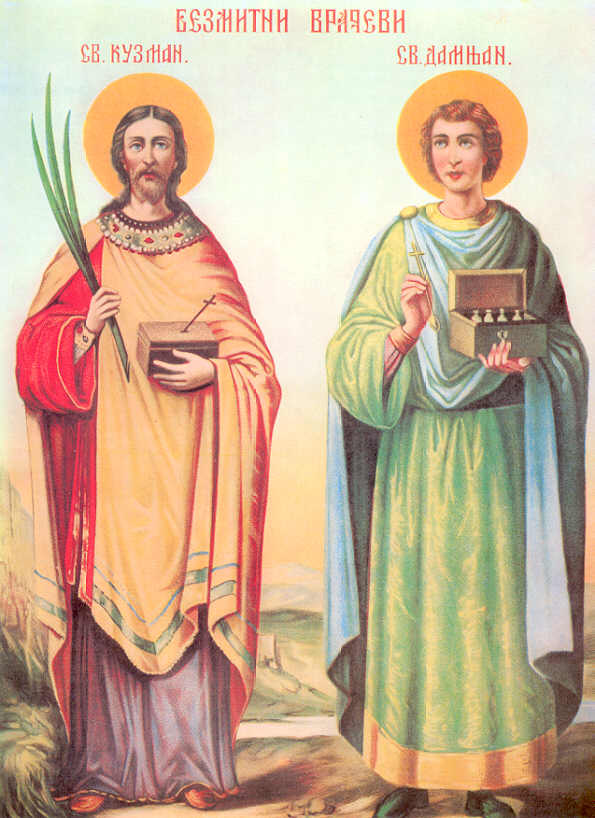
Sts. Cosmas and Damian.

Martyrs Cyrenia and Juliana, in Cilicia.
(Menologion of Basil II, 10th century).

Hieromartyrs John the Bishop and James the Presbyter of Persia.
(Menologion of Basil II, 10th century).

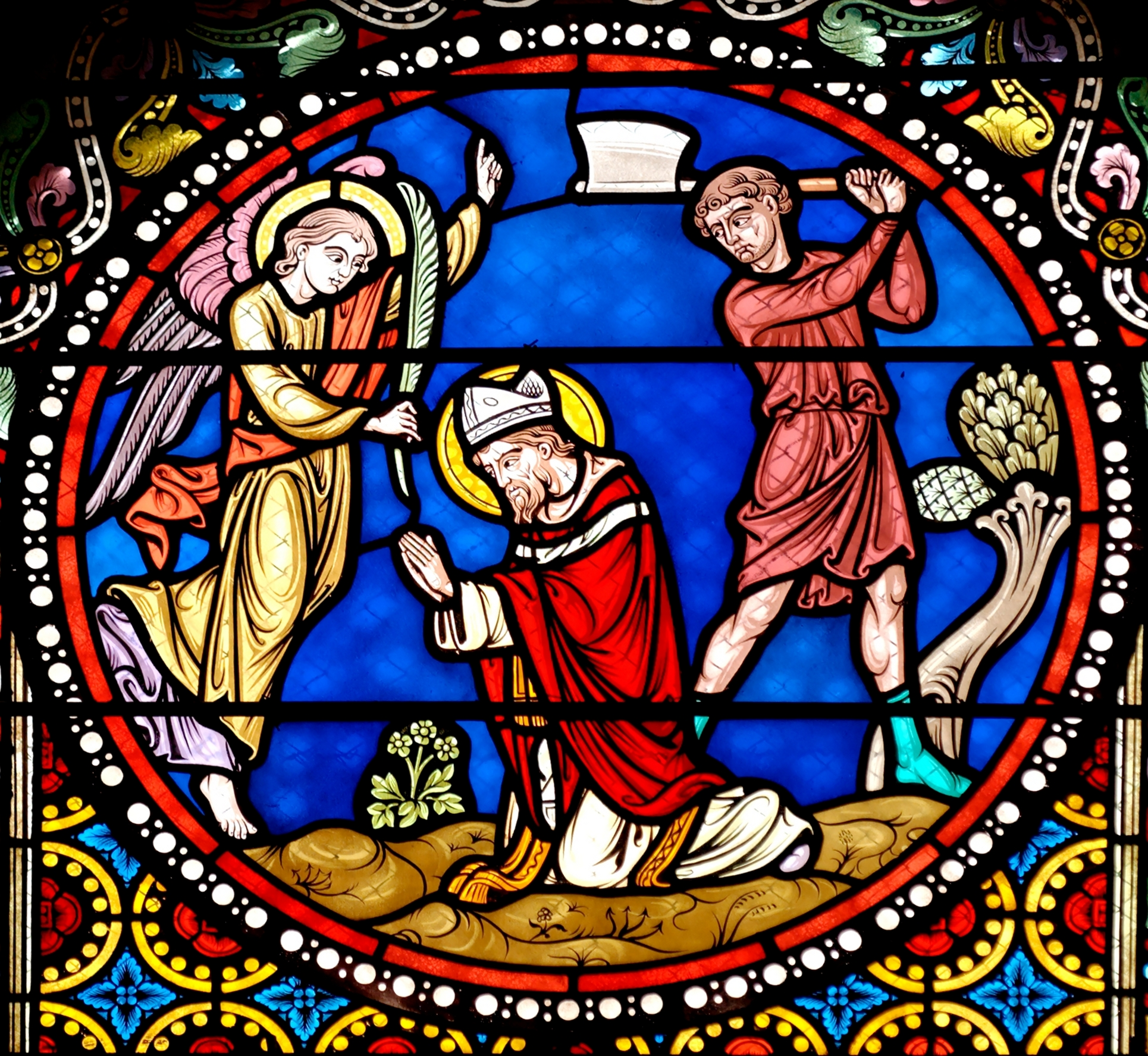
Martyrdom of St. Austremonius (stained glass window from the church Saint-Austremonius of Issoire, Auvergne, France).

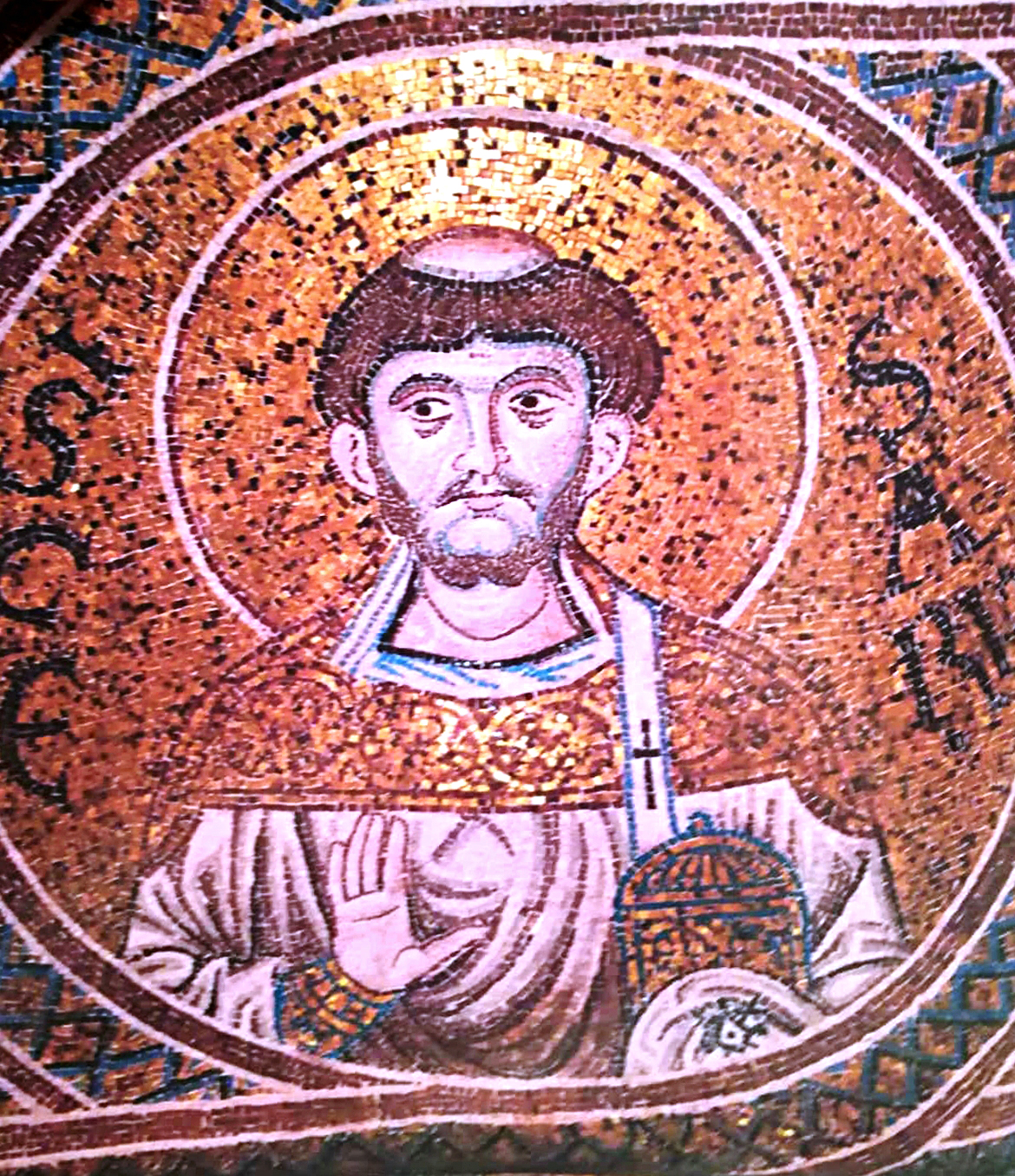
Martyr Caesarius, a Deacon of Africa, at Terracina.

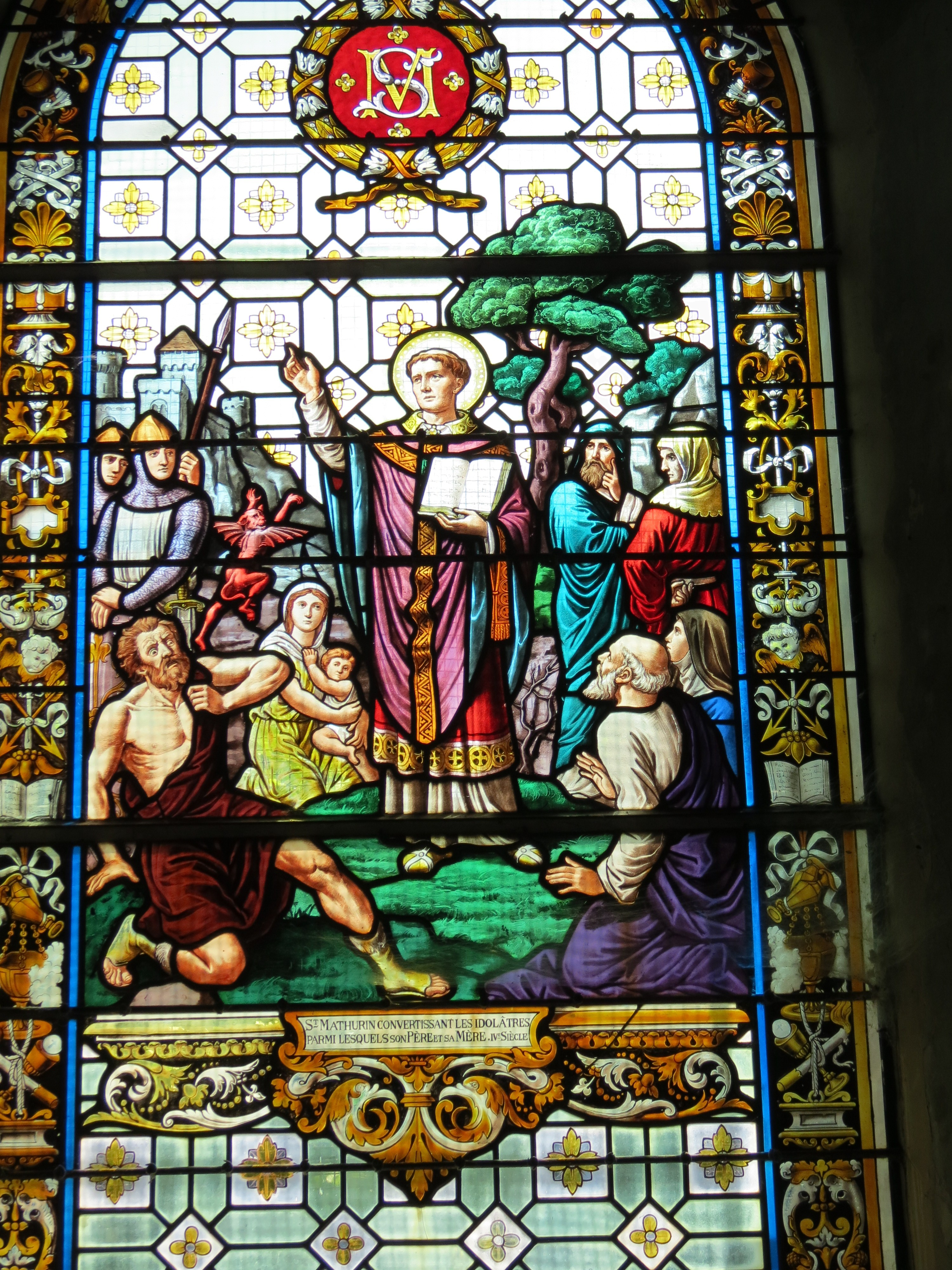
Stained glass window of Saint-Mathurin converting idolaters, including his father and mother.

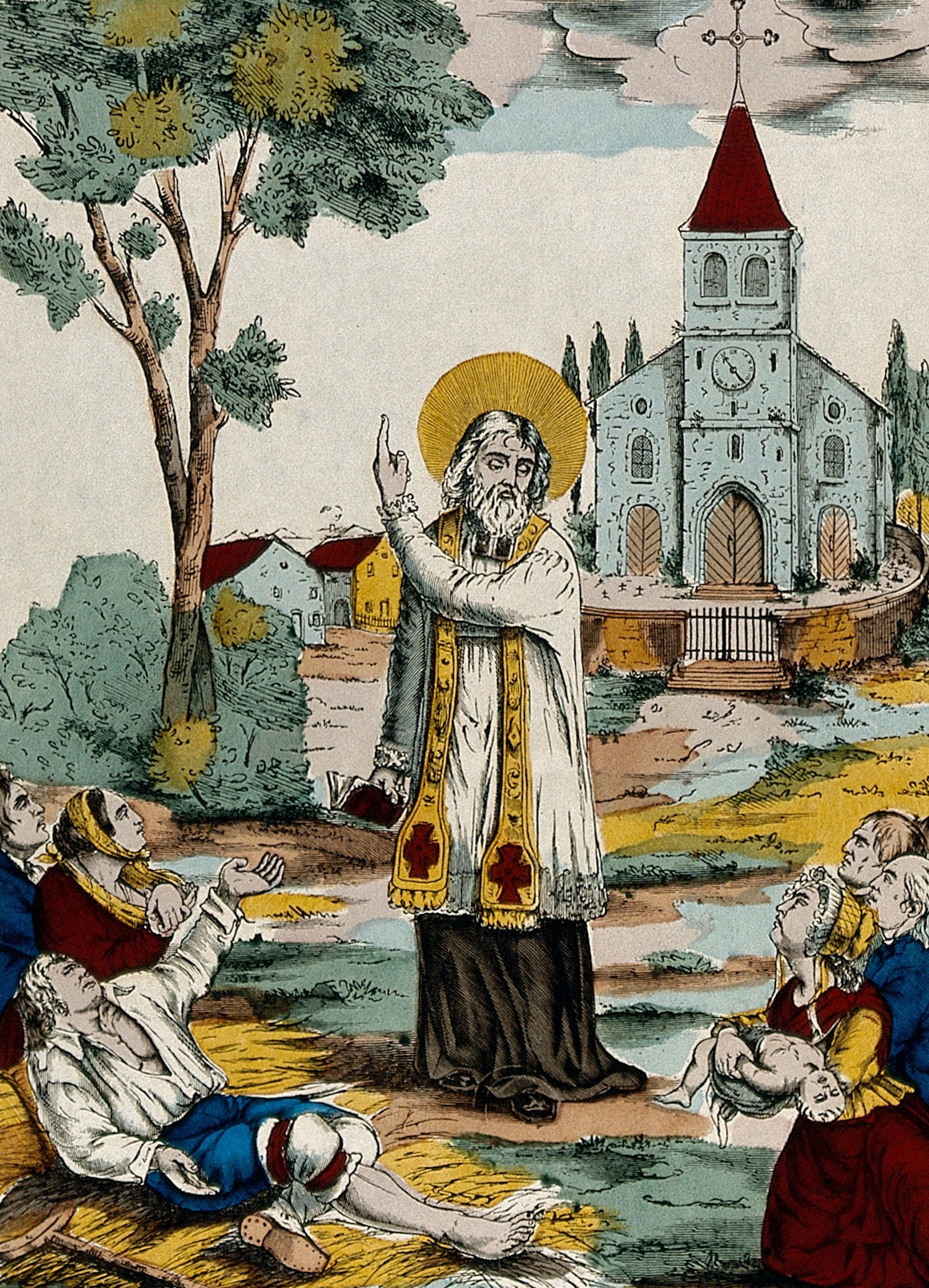
St. Amabilis of Riom.

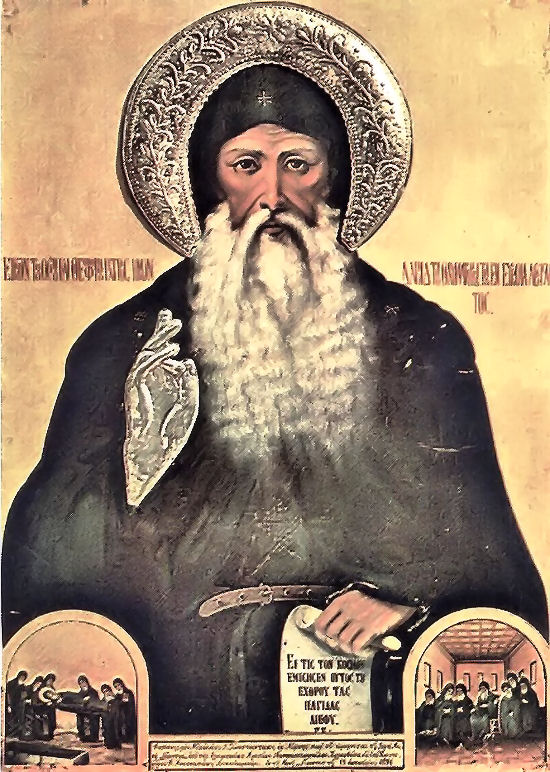
Venerable Saint David of Euboea.

Hieromartyr Sergius (Zverev), Archbishop of Elets and Melitopol.

== Sources ==
- November 1/14. Orthodox Calendar (PRAVOSLAVIE.RU).
- November 14 / November 1. HOLY TRINITY RUSSIAN ORTHODOX CHURCH (A parish of the Patriarchate of Moscow).
- November 1. OCA - The Lives of the Saints.
- November 1. Latin Saints of the Orthodox Patriarchate of Rome.
- The Roman Martyrology. Transl. by the Archbishop of Baltimore. Last Edition, According to the Copy Printed at Rome in 1914. Revised Edition, with the Imprimatur of His Eminence Cardinal Gibbons. Baltimore: John Murphy Company, 1916. pp. 337–338.
- Rev. Richard Stanton. A Menology of England and Wales, or, Brief Memorials of the Ancient British and English Saints Arranged According to the Calendar, Together with the Martyrs of the 16th and 17th Centuries. London: Burns & Oates, 1892. p. 521.

Greek Sources

- Great Synaxaristes: (in Greek) 1 ΝΟΕΜΒΡΙΟΥ. ΜΕΓΑΣ ΣΥΝΑΞΑΡΙΣΤΗΣ.
- (in Greek) Συναξαριστής. 1 Νοεμβρίου. ECCLESIA.GR. (H ΕΚΚΛΗΣΙΑ ΤΗΣ ΕΛΛΑΔΟΣ).

Russian Sources

- (in Russian) 14 ноября (1 ноября). Православная Энциклопедия под редакцией Патриарха Московского и всея Руси Кирилла (электронная версия). (Orthodox Encyclopedia - Pravenc.ru).
- (in Russian) 1 ноября по старому стилю / 14 ноября по новому стилю. Русская Православная Церковь - Православный церковный календарь на 2018 год.
- (in Russian) 1 ноября (ст.ст.) 14 ноября 2013 (нов. ст.). Русская Православная Церковь Отдел внешних церковных связей. (DECR).
