= Annuario Pontificio =

Catholic Holy See annual directory

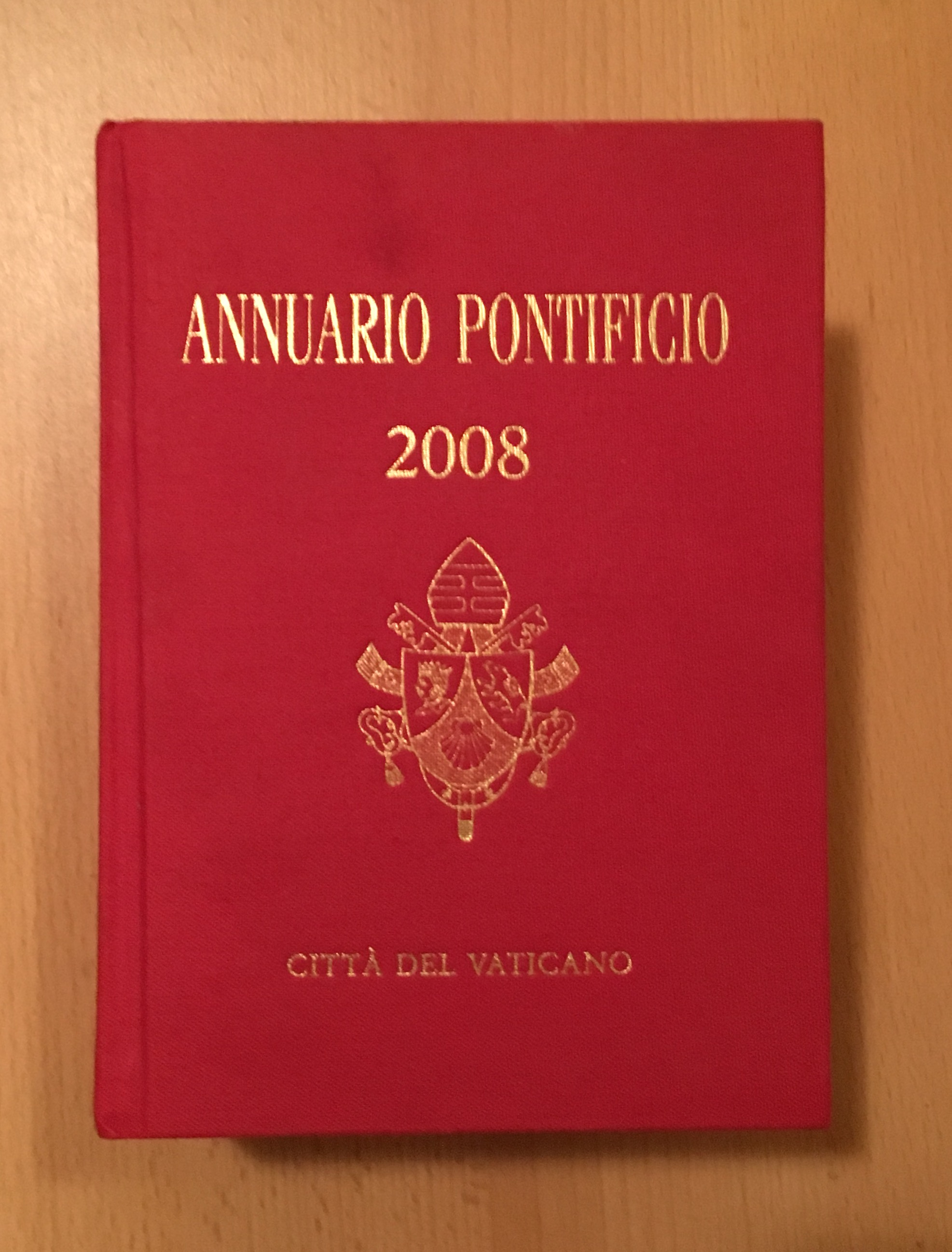
- Annuario Pontificio 2008 edition.
- Author: Libreria Editrice Vaticana, Secretary of State
- Language: Italian
- Genre: Reference yearbook
- Publisher: Holy See
- Publication date: Annual publication (1912–)
- Publication place: Vatican City
- Media type: Hardcover
- OCLC: 781198958

The Annuario Pontificio (Italian for Pontifical Yearbook) is the annual directory of the Holy See of the Catholic Church. It lists the popes in chronological order and all officials of the Holy See's departments. It also provides names and contact information for all cardinals and bishops, the dioceses (with statistics about each), the departments of the Roman Curia, the Holy See's diplomatic missions abroad, the embassies accredited to the Holy See, the headquarters of religious institutes (again with statistics on each), certain academic institutions, and other similar information. The index includes, along with all the names in the body of the book, those of all priests who have been granted the title of "Monsignor". The publication also contains definitions of over 5,000 words and phrases.

The red-covered yearbook, compiled by the Central Office of Church Statistics and published by Libreria Editrice Vaticana, is mostly in Italian. The 2026 edition had more than 2,400 pages and cost €78.

According to the Pontifical Yearbook of 2026, the number of Catholics in the world increased to 1.422 billion at the end of 2024.

== History ==
A yearbook of the Catholic Church was published, with some interruptions, from 1716 to 1859 by the Cracas printing firm in Rome, under the title Information for the Year ... (Italian: Notizie per l'Anno ...) From 1851, a department of the Holy See began producing a different publication called Hierarchy of the Holy Roman Catholic Apostolic Church Worldwide (Italian: Gerarchia della Santa Chiesa Cattolica Apostolica Romana in Tutto L'Orbe), which took the title Annuario Pontificio in 1860. This publication ran from 1860 to 1871. This was the first yearbook published by the Holy See itself, but its compilation was entrusted to the newspaper Giornale di Roma. The Monaldi Brothers (Italian: Fratelli Monaldi) began in 1872 to produce their own yearbook entitled The Catholic Hierarchy and the Papal Household for the Year ... (Italian: La Gerarchia Cattolica e la Famiglia Pontificia per l'Anno ...).

The Vatican Press took over the Gerarchia Cattolica in 1885, thus making it a semi-official publication. It bore the indication "official publication" from 1899 to 1904, but this ceased when, giving the word "official" a more restricted sense, the Acta Sanctae Sedis, forerunner of the Acta Apostolicae Sedis, was declared the only "official" publication of the Holy See. In 1912, it resumed the title Annuario Pontificio. From 1912 to 1924, it included not only lists of names, but also brief illustrative notes on departments of the Roman Curia and on certain posts within the papal court, a practice to which it returned in 1940.

For some years, beginning in 1898, the Maison de la Bonne Presse publishing house of Paris produced a similar yearbook in French called Annuaire Pontifical Catholique, not compiled by the Holy See. This contained much additional information, such as detailed historical articles on the Swiss Guards and the Papal Palace at the Vatican.

The publication went online in December 2025.

== List of popes ==
The Annuario Pontificio provides the Catholic Church's list of popes. As historical questions are reinterpreted by each successive pope, they are recognized in the Annuario Pontificio. For example, the 1942 Annuario Pontificio recognized the decisions of the Council of Pisa (1409), listing three popes for the period: Gregory XII (1406–1409), Alexander V (1409–1410), and John XXIII (1410–1415). The Western Schism was reinterpreted when Pope John XXIII (1958–1963) chose to reuse the ordinal XXIII, citing "twenty-two Johns of indisputable legitimacy." This was reflected in the 1963 Annuario Pontificio, which treated Alexander V and the first John XXIII as antipopes.

== Statistical data ==
Many churches try to obtain accurate ecclesiastical statistics by actively counting their congregants. The Annuario Pontificio superseded the French Annuaire pontifical catholique in providing global statistics on the Roman Catholic Church and arranges such data by diocese; the Statistical Yearbook of the Church arranges the same data by country and continent.

According to the Annuario Pontificio 2012 the statistical data given in the yearbook regarding archdioceses and dioceses are furnished by the diocesan curias concerned and reflect the diocesan situation on 31 December of the year prior to the date on the yearbook, unless there is another indication. The data recorded are shown in the following order next to these abbreviations:

- Su – area in square kilometers of the diocesan territory
- pp – population of the diocese
- ct – number of Catholics
- pr – parishes and quasi-parishes
- ch – churches or mission stations
- sd – secular priests resident in the diocese
- dn – diocesan priests ordained during the year
- sr – religious priests resident in the diocese
- rn – religious priests ordained during the year
- dp – permanent deacons
- sm – seminarians taking courses of philosophy and theology
- rm – members of men's religious institutes
- rf – members of women's religious institutes
- ie – educational institutes
- ib – charitable institutes
- ba – baptisms

== Release details ==
- Annuario Pontificio per l'anno. Città del Vaticano: Libreria Editrice Vaticana. 2021. ISBN 9788826605999.

== See also ==
- Catholic Church by country
- History of the papacy
- Vatican Publishing House
