= Tryphena and Tryphosa =

Women mentioned in the New Testament

Tryphena (Note: Additional spellings include Tryphenna (based on the Latin spelling) and Tryphaena (based on the Greek spelling).) and Tryphosa are Christian women briefly mentioned by name in the Bible in Romans 16:12, in which St. Paul writes: "Greet those workers in the Lord, Tryphaena and Tryphosa."

The Roman Martyrology (up through 1960) commemorated them on November 10, saying: "At Iconium in Lycaonia [was the heavenly birth of] the holy women Tryphenna and Tryphosa, who made much progress in Christian perfection through the preaching of blessed Paul and the example of Thecla."

== See also ==
- Tryphena, as a general name
