= Daughters of the Oratory =

The Daughters of the Oratory (Italian: Figlie dell'Oratorio; Latin: Institutum Filiarum Oratorii; abbreviation: F.d.O.) is a religious institute of pontifical right whose members profess public vows of chastity, poverty, and obedience and follow the evangelical way of life in common.

Their mission is primarily for instruction and Christian education of children and youth. Their rule is based on that of Philip Neri.

This religious institute was founded in Pizzighettone, Italy, in 1885, by Vincenzo Grossi, with the help of Ledovina Maria Scaglioni.

The institute received pontifical status in 1915, and in 2023, the sisters have houses in Argentina, Ecuador and Italy. The Generalate of the Congregation can be found in Rome, Italy.

On 31 December 2005 there are 236 sisters in 29 communities.
