= Menas of Samnium =

Italian Roman Catholic saint

Saint Menas of Samnium

Hermit
- Died: 6th century Samnium, Italy
- Venerated in: Catholic Church
- Feast: November 11

Menas of Samnium (Latin: Sanctus Menna Samnii) is a 6th-century hermit venerated as a saint in the Catholic Church. The primary source for details of his life is an account written by Pope Gregory the Great and also published in the sixth century.

== Veneration ==
The Catholic Church commemorates SAINT Menas on November 11 with an entry in the Roman Martyrology. The 2004 edition of the Martyrology reads: "In the province of Samnium, the commemoration of Saint Menas, hermit, whose virtues Pope Saint Gregory the Great commemorates." His entry in the 1956 edition of the Martyrology (representing the Tridentine tradition) is nearly identical.

== Pope Gregory's account ==
Pope Gregory the Great gives the following account of Menas's life in his Dialogues, published c. 593:

Recently, there was a man named Menas, who lived the life of a holy solitary in the province of Samnium. He was known to many of our people, for he died only about ten years ago. I am not going to name any particular person as the source of my story, because the witnesses for it are nearly as numerous as the people familiar with the province.

This holy solitary had nothing from which to supply his needs except a few beehives. When a Lombard tried to rob him even of these, the holy man gave him a sharp rebuke. Instantly, the barbarian fell to the ground at the saint's feet, violently tormented by the evil spirit. With this miracle the name of Menas became as renowned among the barbarians as it was among the people of Samnium. Thereafter, no one would enter his dwelling except with deep humility.

Often, bears would come out of the neighboring forest to eat up his beehives. Whenever the holy man saw them coming, he would beat them off with a wooden cane he used to carry with him. And these ferocious beasts would grunt and growl as they fled in terror from the blows of the small rod, though ordinarily even swords do not frighten them.

It was his determination not to have anything or look for anything in this world. His zeal urged him to stir up the hearts of all his kind visitors with a longing for eternal life. If as times he noticed faults in some of them, he would not fail to rebuke them. But when he used harsh words, he always strove to speak from a heart burning with the fire of charity.

His neighbors and some friends, who lived a considerable distance away, had made it a practice to send him offerings on certain days of the week to enable him to exercise hospitality toward his visitors. At one time, a landowner by the name of Carterius, overcome by passion, seduced a woman who had vowed her life to God, and then persuaded her to enter an illicit marriage with him. When the man of God heard of this, he gave him a well-deserved reprimand through friends he could trust. Because of a guilty conscience, Carterius did not dare visit the man of God, fearing the rebukes the saint usually gave wrong-doers. Therefore, he arranged to have his usual gifts sent along with the offerings made by the rest. In this way he thought Menas would receive his donation without knowing it. When all the offerings were placed before the holy man, he sat down and without a word began to examine them individually, arranging them all neatly in one place, except the gifts of Carterius. These he pushed aside with disdain, recognizing them through the power of the spirit. "Go," he said, "and tell Carterius: 'You have robbed God of His offering, and you send gifts to me? I will not accept your gifts because you have robbed God of His!'" The hearts of those present were filled with profound dread because of the deep insight with which the saint judged men in their absence.
— Pope St. Gregory the Great, Dialogues, 3.26
