= Pierius =

Pierius was a Christian priest and probably head of the Catechetical School of Alexandria, conjointly with Achillas. He flourished while Theonas was bishop of Alexandria, and died at Rome after 309. The Roman Martyrology commemorates him on 4 November.

His skill as an exegetical writer and as a preacher gained for him the appellation, "Origen the Younger". Philip of Side, Photius, and others assert that he was a martyr. However, since Jerome assures us that he survived the Diocletianic Persecution and spent the rest of his life at Rome, the term "martyr" can only mean that he underwent sufferings, not death, for his faith.

== Works ==
He wrote a work (biblion) comprising twelve treatises or sermons (logoi), in some of which he repeats the dogmatic points attributed by some authors to Origen, such as the subordination of the Holy Ghost to the Father and the Son, and the pre-existence of human souls. His known sermons are: one on the Gospel of St. Luke (eis to kata Loukan); an Easter sermon on Osee (Hosea) (eis to pascha kai ton Osee); a sermon on the Mother of God (peri tes theotokou); a few other Easter sermons; and a eulogy on St. Pamphilus, who had been one of his disciples (eis ton bion tou hagiou Pamphilou).

Only fragments of his writings are extant. They were edited by Martin Joseph Routh, and in Patrologia Graeca; Carl de Boor added some fragments.
