= Amabilis of Riom =

Gallo-Roman saint

Saint Amabilis
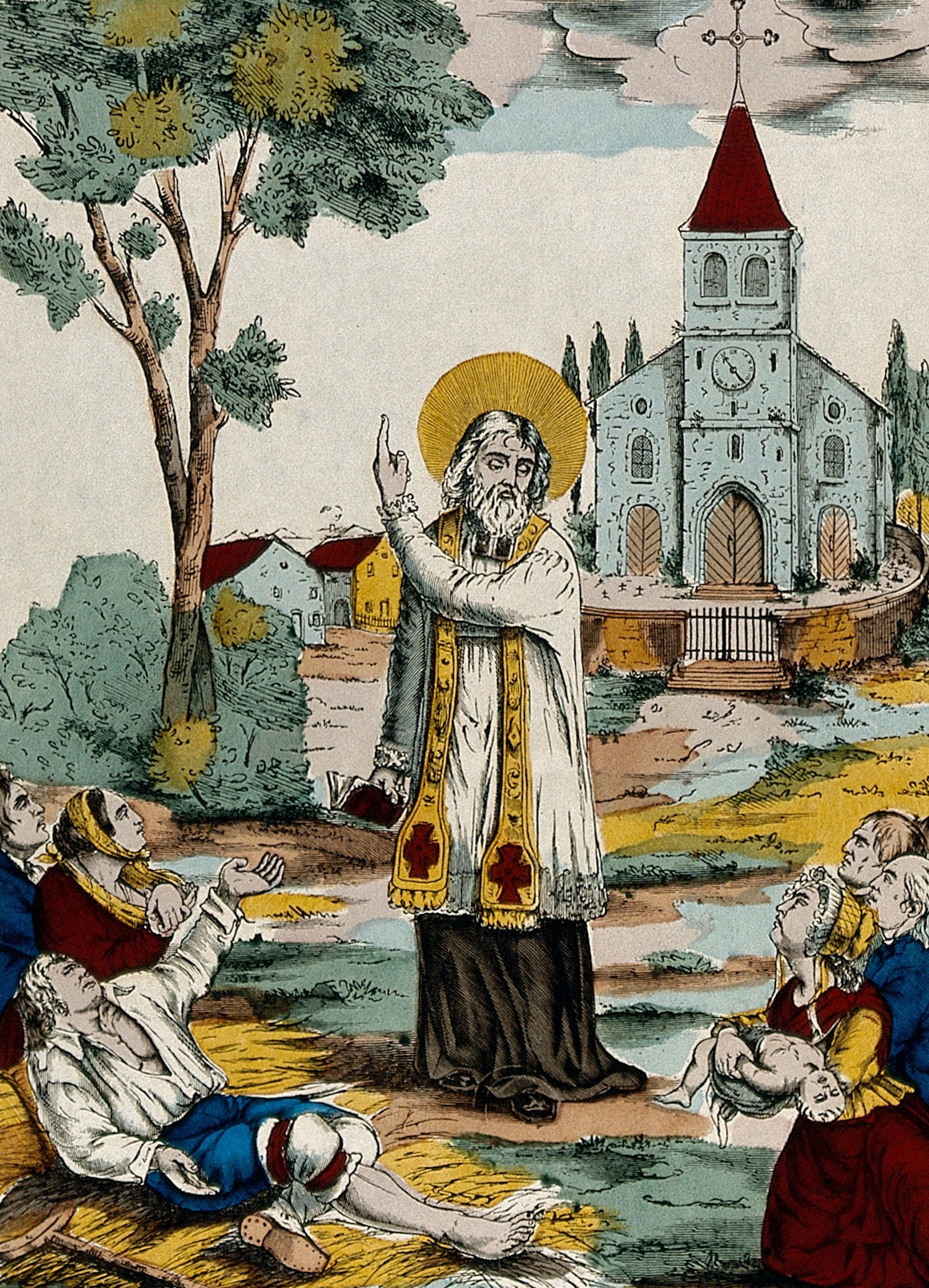
- Died: 475 AD
- Venerated in: Roman Catholic Church
- Feast: 1 November; 18 October
- Attributes: bishop listening to an angel playing music
- Patronage: invoked against fire, snakes and snake bites; also invoked against demonic possession, mental illness, poison, wild beasts; Auvergne; Riom

Amabilis of Riom (or Amabilis of Auvergne) (French: Saint Amable, Italian: Sant'Amabile) was a Gallo-Roman saint. Sidonius Apollinaris brought Amabilis to serve at Clermont.

He served as a cantor in the church of Saint Mary at Clermont and as a precentor at the cathedral of Clermont and then as a parish priest in Riom. He acquired a reputation for holiness in his lifetime.

Amabilis is not to be confused with a female saint (also known as Saint Mable) with this name who died in 634 AD; she was the daughter of an Anglo-Saxon king and became a nun at Saint-Amand monastery, Rouen. Her feast day is 11 July.

== Veneration ==
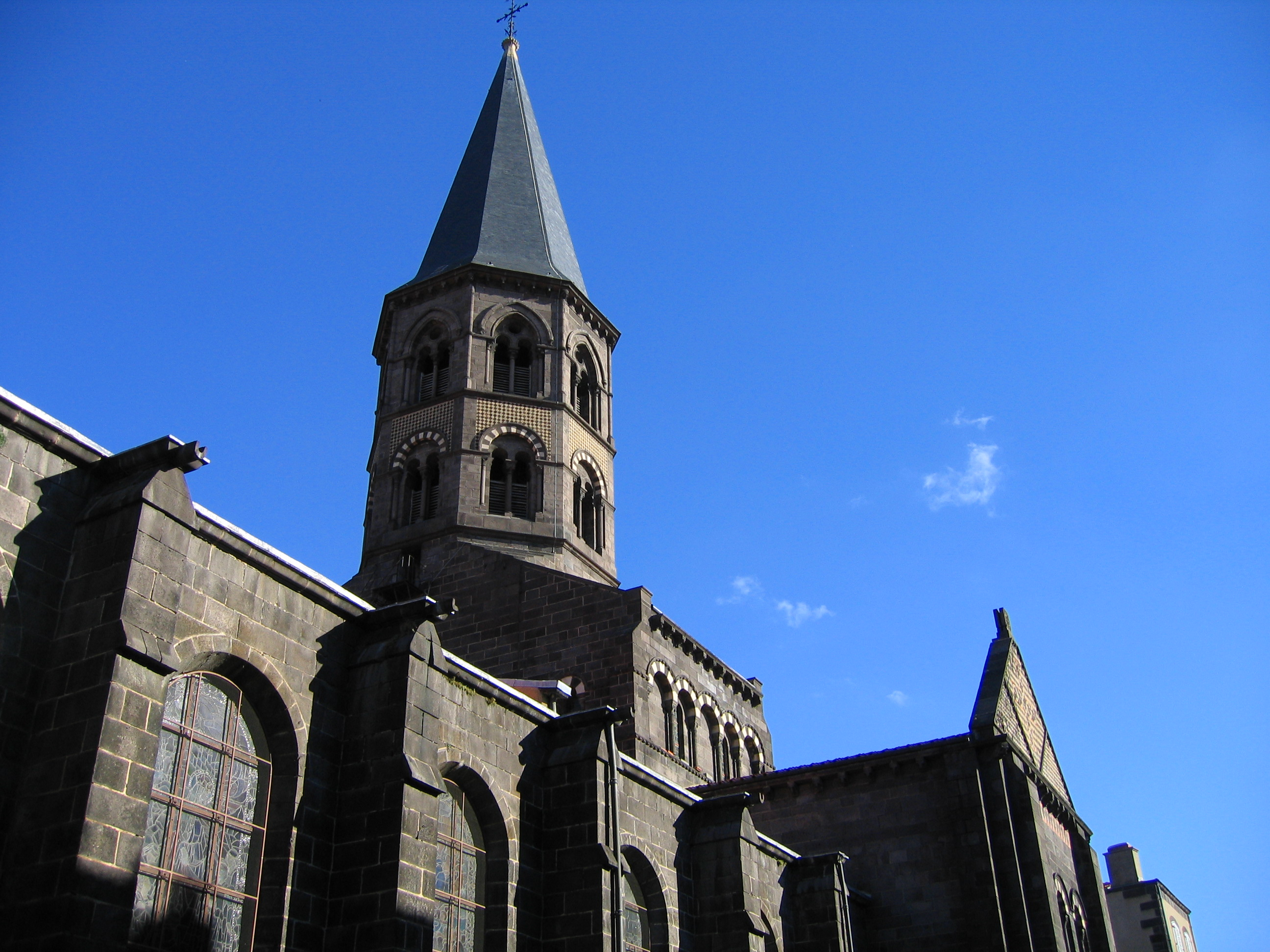
La basilique Saint Amable, Riom.

Riom grew up around the collegiate church of Saint Amable, which was the object of pilgrimages.
