= Tryphena Anderson =

Jamaican-British nurse

Tryphena Anderson (1933-2016) was a Jamaican-British nurse, the first black health visitor in the United Kingdom.

== Life ==
Tryphena Anderson was born in Jamaica, where she attended a Church of England school. In December 1952, a week after leaving school, she sailed for England, arriving in Liverpool on the RMS Franconia from New York.

Anderson recalled teachers having low expectations of her at school. As a black person in 1950s Britain, Anderson felt labelled as a "darkie" rather than truly accepted as a "person". She felt acute isolation:

I wish I could be back home so bad it hurts, tears came into your eyes, because you missed the sort of freedom and companionship that you used to have, you know, with your own kind. One day I was on a bus, and I was upstairs and I was at the corner of Parliament Street, and I saw a black man. Although I was used to the very small community, I just felt, if only this bus would stop, I would get off it and just run and hug him, and find out, you know, where he came from. Because you feel lost, you know.

Anderson nevertheless trained successfully as a nurse at Nottingham General Hospital and did psychiatric nursing at the Coppice Hospital. She did further postgraduate training in the early 1960s. In 1966 she qualified as a midwife, and in that year also became Britain's first black health visitor.

From 1988 until 2002 she owned and ran a nursing home.
