= Vincenzo Grossi =

Italian Roman Catholic saint (1845–1917)

Saint Vincenzo Grossi

Priest
- Born: 9 March 1845; Pizzighettone, Cremona, Italy
- Died: 7 November 1917 (aged 72); Vicobellignano, Cremona, Kingdom of Italy
- Venerated in: Roman Catholic Church
- Beatified: 1 November 1975, Saint Peter's Square, Vatican City by Pope Paul VI
- Canonized: 18 October 2015, Saint Peter's Square, Vatican City by Pope Francis
- Feast: 7 November
- Attributes: Cassock
- Patronage: Daughters of the Oratory

Vincenzo Grossi (9 March 1845 – 7 November 1917) was an Italian Roman Catholic priest and the founder of the Daughters of the Oratory.

Pope Paul VI beatified Grossi on 1 November 1975 and a second miracle that Pope Francis approved in 2015 paved the path for his eventual canonization. He was canonized as a saint of the Roman Catholic Church on 18 October 2015.

== Life ==
Vincenzo Grossi was born on 9 March 1845 in Cremona as the last of seven brothers to Baldassare Grossi and Maddalena Capellini; he was baptized on the same day. As a child, he learned how to pray from his mother and learned about the seriousness of work from his father.

After the reception of his First Communion, he announced to his family his desire to join the priesthood. When he wanted to enter the seminary to become a priest, his father wanted him to stay with the family, but ultimately relented to his son's wishes. Despite this, he was forced to postpone his plans due to family reasons, so worked in his father's mill for a brief period of time. He entered the seminary on November 4, 1864 and commenced his studies for the priesthood in Cremona. Grossi was ordained as a priest on 22 May 1869. He was stationed as a parish priest in Regona and Vicobellignano in 1873 and 1883 respectively, where he dedicated himself to the poor.

He founded the Daughters of the Oratory in 1885 and ensured that the order was guided by the rules of Saint Philip Neri. Grossi focused on youth outreach and he would help young people realize their vocations. The Oratory devoted itself to the youth, in particular. He chose a life of poverty, and became well known for his work with children as well as for his preaching abilities.

He died on 7 November 1917 at the age of 72, uttering the words: "the way is open, we must go".

== Canonization ==
Grossi's spiritual writings were approved by theologians on 23 December 1952. The canonization process commenced on 2 April 1954 under Pope Pius XII which bestowed upon him the title of Servant of God. The cause opened in Lodi and the local process commenced. The process was validated on 9 November 1959.

Pope Paul VI recognized his life of heroic virtue and proclaimed him to be Venerable on 10 May 1973. A miracle attributed to his intercession was investigated and was validated. Paul VI approved the miracle and celebrated the beatification on 1 November 1975.

A second miracle attributed to his intercession was investigated and was validated on 15 October 2011. The medical board based in Rome approved the miracle after discussion regarding the healing on 20 November 2014 and passed it on to the theologians who also made known their approval of the healing as a miracle. On 5 May 2015, Pope Francis approved the miracle as being directly attributed to Grossi's intercession which allowed for him to be canonized. A date was set for his canonization in a consistory on 27 June 2015 and Grossi was canonized as a saint on 18 October 2015.
