= Sylvia of Aquitaine =

Fourth-century pilgrim

Sylvia of Aquitaine was a fourth century nun from Aquitaine who was believed, based on an account attributed to her, to have gone on a pilgrimage sometime between 379 and 388 A.D. This account, however, is now attributed to another nun named Egeria.

She was the sister of Rufinus, the chief minister of the Byzantine Empire under Theodosius and Arcadius. Palladius' Lausiac History tells she journeyed in the age of 60, and prided in her ascetic habits.

Her feast day is celebrated on November 5. She should not be confused with Saint Silvia, the mother of Pope Gregory the Great.
