= Pizzighettone =

Pizzighettone Pisighitòn (Lombard)
- Comune
- Comune di Pizzighettone
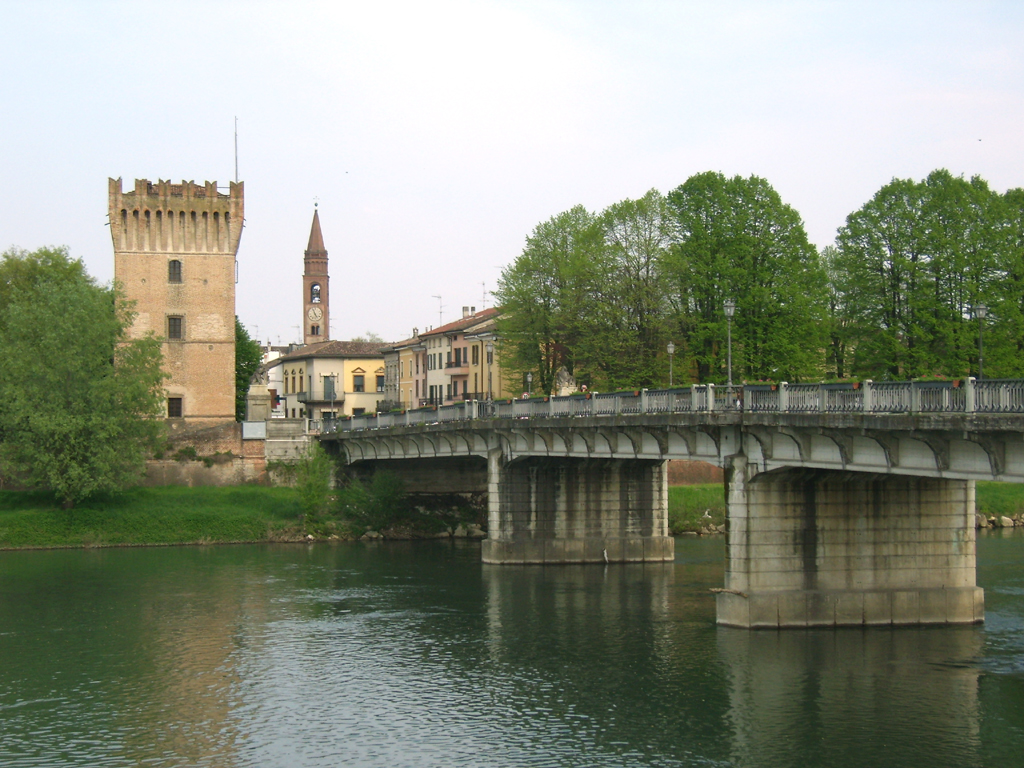

- Coat of arms

- Location within Italy Location within Lombardy
- Coordinates: 45°11′N 9°47′E
- Country: Italy
- Region: Lombardy
- Province: Cremona (CR)
- Frazioni: Ferie, Regona, Roggione

Government
  - Mayor: Luigi Edoardo Bernocchi

Area
  - Total: 32 km^{2} (12 sq mi)

Population (1 January 2009)
  - Total: 6,777
  - Density: 210/km^{2} (550/sq mi)
- Demonym: Pizzighettonesi
- Time zone: UTC+1 (CET)
  - Summer (DST): UTC+2 (CEST)
- Postal code: 26026
- Dialing code: 0372
- Patron saint: Saint Bassianus
- Saint day: 19 January
- Website: Official website

Pizzighettone (Pizzighettonese: Pisighitòn) is a comune of the Province of Cremona in the Italian region Lombardy. The main population centre is located on the river Adda and is divided into two parts: Pizzighettone on the east bank and Gera on the west.

Francis I of France was imprisoned in the tower of Pizzighettone following the Battle of Pavia in 1525. It was the site of the Insubrian town of Acerrae, and was home to the football team AS Pizzighettone, until the summer 2012 when it moved to city of Crema and changed its name to U.S. Pergolettese 1932.

Saint Vincenzo Grossi was born in Pizzighettone.
