= Orestes of Cappadocia =

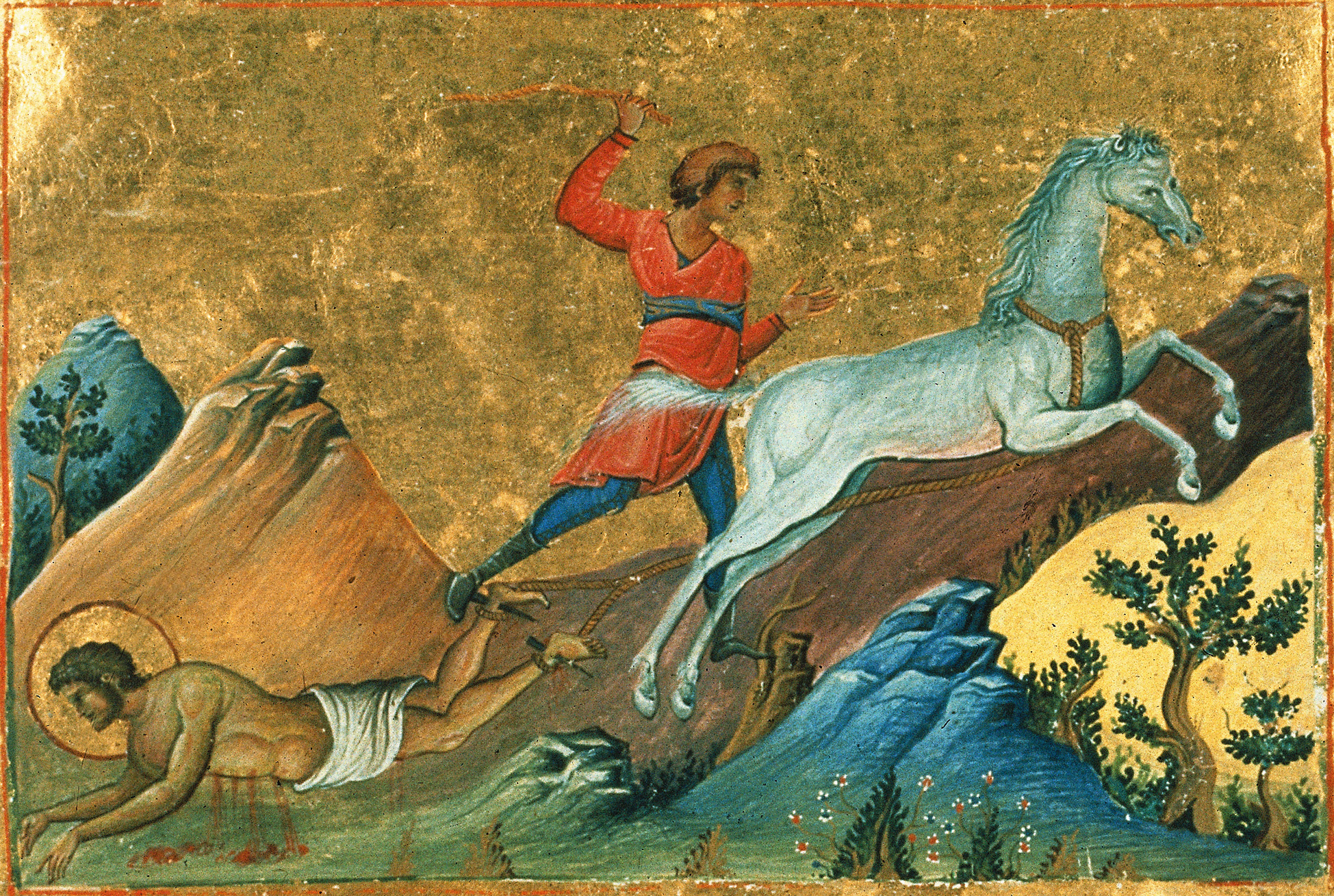
Orestes of Cappadocia from the Menologion of Basil II (c. 1000 AD)

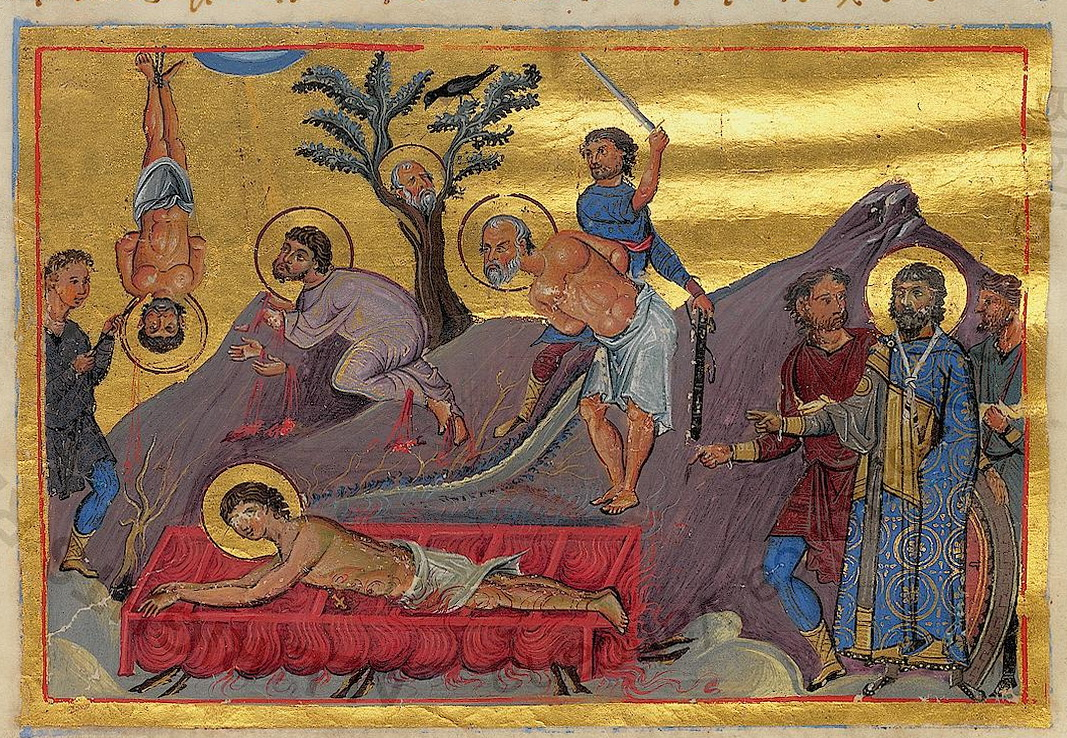
The Holy Martyrs Eustratius, Auxentius, Eugene, Mardarius and Orestes

Orestes of Cappadocia (Greek: Ορέστης ό Καππαδόκης) was a soldier who is venerated as a martyr by the Eastern Orthodox Church, along with Eustratius, Auxentius, Eugene, and Mardarius. Tradition states that he was martyred during the reign of Diocletian.
