= Licinius of Angers =

Licinius of Angers (also known as Saint Lezin, or Lésin) (c.540–c.610) was a Frankish nobleman and bishop of Angers, celebrated as Catholic saint on 13 February.

Lucinius was born about 540 and sent to the court of King Chlothar I when about 20. Chlothar's son King Chilperic I made him governor of Angers. Upon the death of Bishop Audouin in about 600, he was also made bishop of Angers by King Chlothar II.

He founded a monastery and a Church both dedicated to St John the Baptist, and was buried there. His age at death was said to be 64 and the date 618 by one source, but others state earlier.
