= Summorum Pontificum =

Apostolic letter of Pope Benedict XVI on Tridentine Mass

Summorum Pontificum Latin for 'Of the Supreme Pontiffs' Apostolic constitution of Pope Benedict XVI
- Signature date: 7 July 2007
- Subject: Tridentine Mass
- Text: In Latin; In English

Summorum Pontificum (English: 'Of the Supreme Pontiffs') is an Apostolic Letter of Pope Benedict XVI decreed on 7 July 2007.

This letter specifies the circumstances in which Catholic priests of the Latin Church could celebrate Mass according to the "Missal promulgated by Pope Saint John XXIII in 1962" (the last edition of the Roman Missal, in the form known as the Tridentine Mass) and administer most of the sacraments in the form used before the liturgical reforms that followed the Second Vatican Council.

It granted greater freedom for priests to use the Tridentine liturgy in its 1962 form, stating that all priests of the Latin Church may freely celebrate Mass with the 1962 Missal privately. It also provided that "in parishes where a group of the faithful attached to the previous liturgical tradition stably exists, the parish priest should willingly accede to their requests to celebrate Holy Mass according to the rite of the 1962 Roman Missal" and should "ensure that the good of these members of the faithful is harmonised with the ordinary pastoral care of the parish, under the governance of the bishop". It also granted use of the preconciliar Rituale Romanum and the Pontificale Romanum, for the celebration of all the seven sacraments, as well as allowing the Breviarium Romanum as revised under Pope Saint Pius X to clergymen ordained (deacons, priests, bishops).

On 16 July 2021, Pope Francis abrogated Summorum Pontificum with the motu proprio Traditionis custodes which imposed new restrictions for celebration of the Mass according to the 1962 Roman Missal.

== Background ==
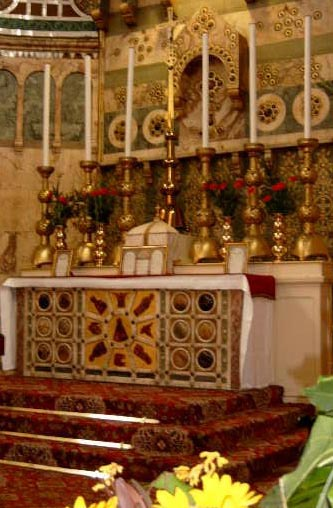
A pre-1969 Roman Rite altar with reredos. A main altar was usually preceded by three steps, below which were said the prayers at the foot of the altar. Side altars usually had only one step.

The Roman Rite of the Catholic Mass has undergone, especially in the early centuries, various developments. In response to Sacrosanctum Concilium, the 1963 document of the Second Vatican Council, the rite was systematically revised, leading to the publication in 1970 of Pope Paul VI's revision of the Roman Missal, which some Traditionalist Catholics claimed constituted a rupture with what went before. (Note: In the letter that accompanied Summorum Pontificum, Pope Benedict XVI would ultimately address this concern by insisting that "[t]here is no contradiction between the two editions of the Roman Missal. In the history of the liturgy there is growth and progress, but no rupture.")

Such concerns led French Archbishop Marcel Lefebvre to found a seminary and society of priests – the Society of St. Pius X (SSPX) – dedicated to the exclusive celebration of sacraments according to the traditional Roman Rite, in 1970. Canonically suspended by the Holy See in 1976, Lefebvre continued negotiations with Pope Paul VI and Pope John Paul II over the following decade. While these negotiations did not produce a regularization of the SSPX, they did induce John Paul II to issue a decree in 1984, Quattuor Abhinc Annos, providing a limited permission, or indult, to celebrate the traditional Roman Rite. (Note: This indult would be affirmed four years by John Paul II in his motu proprio Ecclesia Dei, which addressed the resistance of many bishops to the indult: "Respect must everywhere be shown for the feelings of all those who are attached to the Latin liturgical tradition, by a wide and generous application" of the indult.) However, many traditionalists, frustrated with the unwillingness of most bishops to implement the indult in their dioceses, demanded what they called a universal indult whereby all priests would be allowed to use the former rite even publicly without seeking any specific authorisation.

The SSPX, whose founder Lefebvre was excommunicated in 1988 following the Ecône Consecrations, thereafter made permission to use the Tridentine Mass as a preliminary condition for engaging in any doctrinal dialogue with the Holy See.

== Contents of the motu proprio ==
=== Name ===
As is customary for papal documents, the motu proprio (which has no title) is referred to by its incipit, the opening words of the (Latin) original text: Summorum Pontificum. "Supreme Pontiff" is a title of the popes, and the opening sentence states that it has always been a concern "of the Supreme Pontiffs" that the Church should offer fitting worship to God.

=== Summary of Summorum Pontificum ===
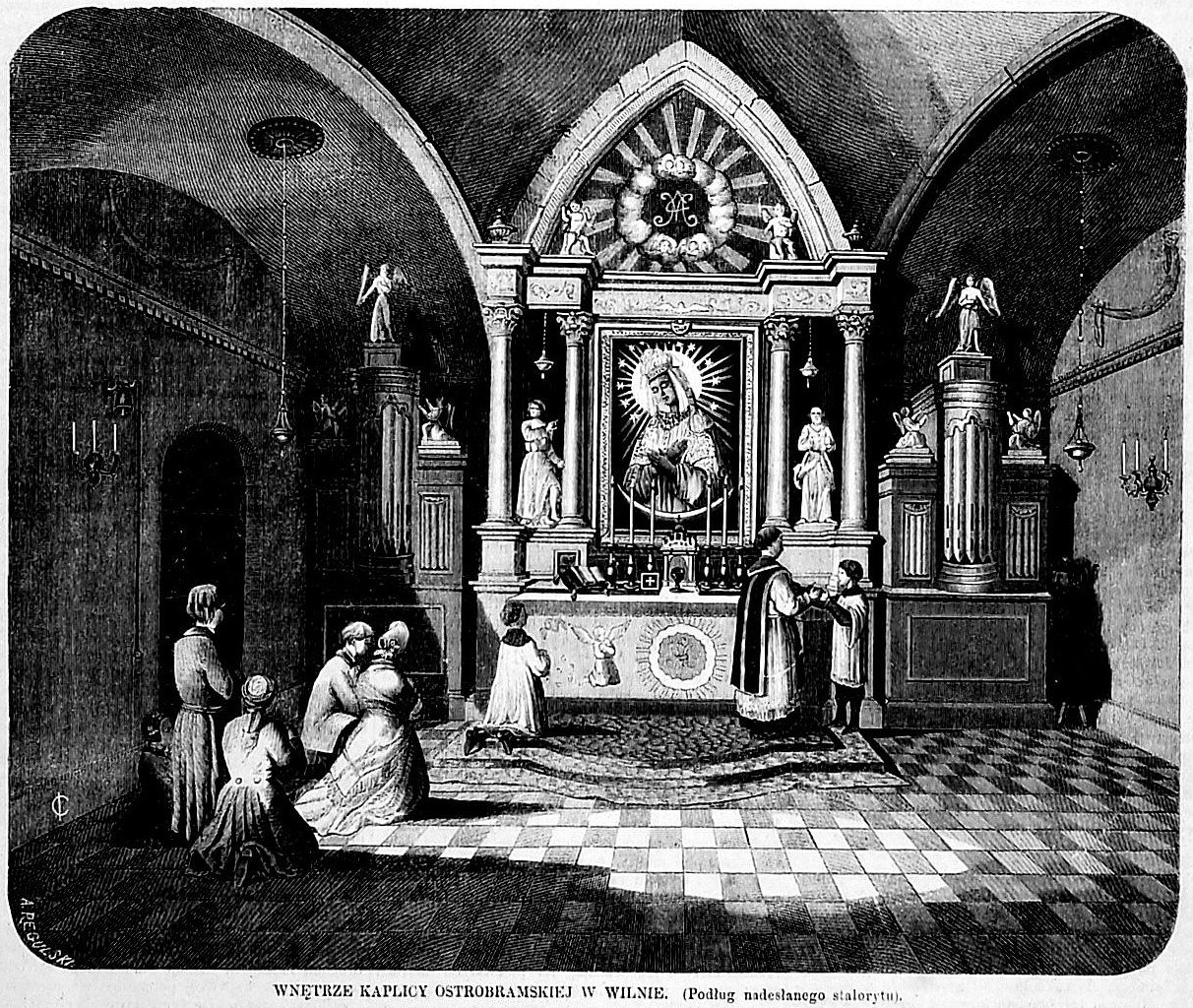
Low Mass celebrated at the Chapel of the Dawn Gate in Wilno (Vilnius). Interior in 1864.

Pope Benedict XVI released the document after "much reflection, numerous consultations, and prayer". In article 1 of the document, he spoke of "the typical edition of the Roman Missal, which was promulgated by Blessed John XXIII in 1962", as "never abrogated". In the letter he specified this as "never juridically abrogated". In article 2 he stated that, "in Masses celebrated without a congregation, any Catholic priest of the Latin rite, whether secular or regular, may use either the Roman Missal published in 1962 by Blessed Pope John XXIII or the Roman Missal promulgated in 1970 by Pope Paul VI, and may do so on any day, with the exception of the Easter Triduum". For such a celebration with either Missal, the priest needs no permission from the Apostolic See or from his own Ordinary. In article 4, he said that these Masses celebrated without a congregation "may be attended also by members of the lay faithful who spontaneously request to do so, with respect for the requirements of law".

The document superseded the letter Quattuor Abhinc Annos of 1984 and the motu proprio Ecclesia Dei of 1988, which had allowed individual bishops, under certain conditions, to establish places where Mass could be said using the 1962 Missal. It granted greater freedom for priests to use the Tridentine liturgy in its 1962 form, stating that all priests of the Latin Church may freely celebrate Mass with the 1962 Missal privately. It also provided that "in parishes where a group of the faithful attached to the previous liturgical tradition stably exists, the parish priest should willingly accede to their requests to celebrate Holy Mass according to the rite of the 1962 Roman Missal" and should "ensure that the good of these members of the faithful is harmonised with the ordinary pastoral care of the parish, under the governance of the bishop" (Article 5).

Regarding public Masses, the Pope asked parish priests and rectors of churches to permit, at the request of a group of the faithful attached to the previous liturgical tradition stably existing in the parish, celebration of a Tridentine Mass on weekdays, but also one such Mass on Sundays and feasts, by a priest who is qualified and who is not excluded by law, and to grant permission also if requested "in special circumstances such as marriages, funerals or occasional celebrations, e.g. pilgrimages".

Apart from celebration of Mass, Pope Benedict authorised parish priests to grant, "after careful consideration" and "if advantageous for the good of souls", permission to use the older ritual in the administration of Baptism, Marriage, Penance, and Anointing of the Sick. He also allowed bishops, on the same condition, to use the earlier Pontifical in administering Confirmation, and permitted clergy to use the 1962 edition of the Roman Breviary. Bishops could establish "personal parishes" or appoint chaplains for administering the sacraments according to the old form.

The Pontifical Commission Ecclesia Dei, whose role the document confirmed, was given authority to ensure observance of the rules laid down in the document. Stable groups of the kind mentioned in article 5 whose parish priest does not grant them their request should inform the diocesan bishop, who is asked to satisfy their desire. If he does not wish to do so, they should inform the Pontifical Commission, to which also a bishop who does not have the means to respond to their wish can have recourse for advice and assistance. The motu proprio allows what some traditionalists would call the novelty of proclaiming the Scripture readings "also" in the vernacular language in Masses with a congregation, and in the accompanying letter the Pope said that "new Saints and some of the new Prefaces can and should be inserted in the old Missal", a matter that he committed for study to the Pontifical Commission Ecclesia Dei.

=== Conditions for use of the 1962 Missal ===
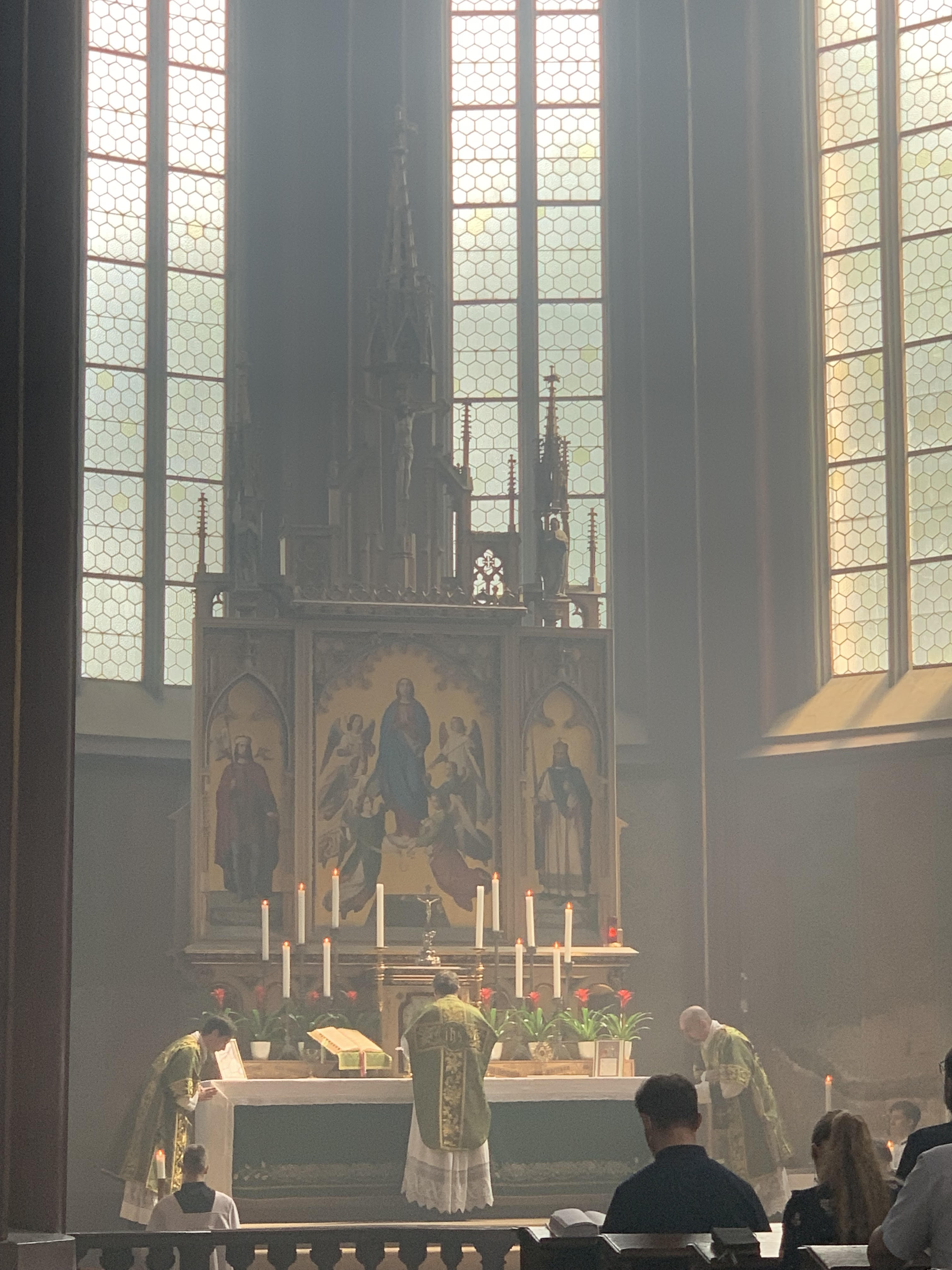
Assisted mass by missal 1962 (Prague)

The conditions for the use of the 1962 Missal previously in force were replaced by the following:

- "In Masses celebrated without a congregation, any Catholic priest of the Latin Church, whether secular or religious, may use either the Roman Missal published in 1962 by Blessed John XXIII, or the Roman Missal promulgated in 1970 by Pope Paul VI, and may do so on any day, with the exception of the Easter Triduum (when Masses without a congregation are not allowed). For such a celebration with either Missal, the priest needs no permission from the Apostolic See or from his own Ordinary. The celebrations of Mass mentioned above ... may be attended also by members of the lay faithful who spontaneously request to do so, with respect for the requirements of law." (Articles 2 and 4)
- "In parishes where a group of the faithful attached to the previous liturgical tradition stably exists, the parish priest should willingly accede to their requests to celebrate Holy Mass according to the rite of the 1962 Roman Missal. He should ensure that the good of these members of the faithful is harmonized with the ordinary pastoral care of the parish, under the governance of the bishop in accordance with Canon 392, avoiding discord and favouring the unity of the whole Church. In churches other than parish or conventual churches, it is for the rector of the church to grant the above permission." (Article 5 §1 and §5)
  "Celebration according to the Missal of Blessed John XXIII can take place on weekdays; on Sundays and feast days, however, such a celebration may also take place." The English translation omits the limitation on Sundays and feast days to a single such Mass. This limitation is expressed in the Latin text, which is what has juridical value. (Article 5 §2)
  "For those faithful or priests who request it, the pastor should allow celebrations in this extraordinary form also in special circumstances such as marriages, funerals or occasional celebrations, e.g. pilgrimages." (Article 5 §3)
  "Priests using the Missal of Blessed John XXIII must be qualified (idonei) and not prevented by law." Excommunication or suspension a divinis would be examples of legal prohibitions against celebrating Mass. (Article 5 §4)
- If communities of Institutes of Consecrated Life and Societies of Apostolic Life, whether of pontifical or diocesan right, wish to celebrate the conventual or community Mass in their own oratories according to the 1962 edition of the Roman Missal, they are permitted to do so. If an individual community or an entire Institute or Society wishes to have such celebrations frequently, habitually or permanently, the matter is to be decided by the Major Superiors according to the norm of law and their particular laws and statutes." (Article 3)

In an interview on Vatican Radio, the then Cardinal President of the Pontifical Commission Ecclesia Dei Darío Castrillón Hoyos commented that "priests can decide, without permission from the Holy See or the bishop, to celebrate the Mass in the ancient rite. And this holds true for all priests. It is the parish priests who must open the doors to those priests that, having the faculty [to do so], go to celebrate. It is not therefore necessary to ask any other permission."

Article 2 of the motu proprio applies, without distinction, to priests of the Latin Rite, all of whom are therefore authorized to use, in Masses celebrated without the people, either the older (1962) or the newer (1970) form of the Roman Rite, even if they are also authorized to use another Latin liturgical rite, such as the Ambrosian Rite. It does not apply to priests of the Eastern Catholic Churches. It concerns only the Roman Rite and does not deal with use of older forms of other Latin liturgical rites, which is a matter for the authorities charged with regulating those rites.

With letter 13/2007 of 20 January 2010 the Pontifical Council Ecclesia Dei responded positively to a question whether a parish priest (pastor) or another priest may on his own initiative publicly celebrate the extraordinary form, along with the customary regular use of the new form, "so that the faithful, both young and old, can familiarize themselves with the old rites and benefit from their perceptible beauty and transcendence". Although the Council accompanied this response with the observation that a stable group of the faithful attached to the older form has a right to assist at Mass in the extraordinary form, a website that published the response interpreted it as not requiring the existence of such a stable group.

== Summary of the accompanying letter ==
In his accompanying letter, Pope Benedict explained that his action was aimed at broadly and generously providing for the rituals which nourished the faithful for centuries and at "coming to an interior reconciliation in the heart of the Church" with Traditionalist Catholics in disagreement with the Holy See, such as the members of the Society of St. Pius X. He stated that, while it had first been thought that interest in the Tridentine Mass would disappear with the older generation that had grown up with it, some young persons too have "felt its attraction and found in it a form of encounter with the mystery of the Eucharist particularly suited to them." In view of fears expressed while the document was in preparation, he took pains to emphasize that his decision in no way detracts from the authority of the Second Vatican Council and that, not only for juridical reasons, but also because the requisite "degree of liturgical formation and some knowledge of the Latin language" are not found very often, "the Missal published by Paul VI and then republished in two subsequent editions by John Paul II, obviously is and continues to be the normal Form – the Forma ordinaria – of the Eucharistic Liturgy."

In his cover letter to the bishops, Pope Benedict declared unfounded two fears that had been expressed with regard to the change that he was making: that the change would detract from the authority of the Second Vatican Council; and that it would lead to disarray or even divisions within parish communities.

He recognised that "there have been exaggerations and at times social aspects unduly linked to the attitude of the faithful attached to the ancient Latin liturgical tradition." To avoid the situation whereby the desire to recover the old form of liturgy "occurred above all because in many places celebrations were not faithful to the prescriptions of the new Missal, but the latter actually was understood as authorising or even requiring creativity, which frequently led to deformations of the liturgy which were hard to bear ... caus[ing] deep pain to individuals totally rooted in the faith of the Church", he recommended faithful observance of the Missal of Paul VI: "The most sure guarantee that the Missal of Paul VI can unite parish communities and be loved by them consists in its being celebrated with great reverence in harmony with the liturgical directives. This will bring out the spiritual richness and the theological depth of this Missal."

=== Interior reconciliation ===
Benedict cited "interior reconciliation in the heart of the Church" as a "positive reason" for the motu proprio.

Benedict, who himself led discussions with the SSPX during his tenure as Prefect of the Congregation for the Doctrine of the Faith, gave as a reason for making the effort represented by his motu proprio the regretted fact that, "over the centuries ... at critical moments when divisions were coming about, not enough was done by the Church's leaders to maintain or regain reconciliation and unity" and "omissions on the part of the Church have had their share of blame for the fact that these divisions were able to harden." However, he pointed out, in the same cover letter, that, "needless to say, in order to experience full communion, the priests of the communities adhering to the former usage cannot, as a matter of principle, exclude celebrating according to the new books. The total exclusion of the new rite would not in fact be consistent with the recognition of its value and holiness."

The Pope clarified that, as a result of his motu proprio, "the last version of the Missale Romanum prior to the Council, which was published with the authority of Pope John XXIII in 1962 and used during the Council will now be able to be used as a Forma extraordinaria of the liturgical celebration", but that "the Missal published by Paul VI and then republished in two subsequent editions by John Paul II obviously is and continues to be the normal Form – the Forma ordinaria – of the Eucharistic Liturgy"; and that: "It is clearly seen that the new Missal will certainly remain the ordinary Form of the Roman Rite, not only on account of the juridical norms, but also because of the actual situation of the communities of the faithful."

After saying in his letter to bishops, with which he accompanied the motu proprio, that "in the movement led by Archbishop Lefebvre, fidelity to the old Missal became an external mark of identity", Pope Benedict added: "The reasons for the break which arose over this, however, were at a deeper level."

=== Appeal of the ancient form ===
Apart from the question of reconciliation with traditionalist groups, the Pope also mentioned that, immediately after the promulgation of the new form of the Mass, it was presumed that "requests for the use of the 1962 Missal would be limited to the older generation which had grown up with it", but recognizes that "in the meantime it has clearly been demonstrated that young persons too have discovered this liturgical form, felt its attraction and found in it a form of encounter with the Mystery of the Most Holy Eucharist, particularly suited to them." Due to this continuing appeal of the ancient form of the Mass across generational groups, it was felt that cases should no longer be decided on a case-by-case basis, and that instead the need had arisen for "clearer juridical regulation which had not been foreseen" in the past.

The Pope stressed: "There is no contradiction between the two editions of the Roman Missal. In the history of the liturgy there is growth and progress, but no rupture. What earlier generations held as sacred, remains sacred and great for us too, and it cannot be all of a sudden entirely forbidden or even considered harmful. It behooves all of us to preserve the riches which have developed in the Church's faith and prayer, and to give them their proper place." He continued by demanding recognition also of the "value and holiness" of celebration according to the new books.

== Reactions ==
=== Reactions by Catholic bishops ===
Most internal official reactions emphasised the wish of unity and reconciliation within the Church:

- The Bishops' Conference of Scotland said in a statement that the document "reflects the pastoral concern" of Benedict XVI "for those who find themselves drawn to that form of the Eucharistic celebration, ... a pastoral concern which the bishops of Scotland share," sharing the Pope's "concern about the unity of the Church."
- An atypical reaction was that of Chilean bishop Juan Ignacio González Errázuriz, who said the document was aimed not so much at "putting an end to the schism of Archbishop Lefebvre and his followers" as at promoting unity among Chinese Catholics. However, even the parts of the Catholic Church in China that were under the control of the Government-created Chinese Patriotic Catholic Association had for years already been using the revised form of the Mass and in the vernacular, not the Tridentine Mass in Latin.
- Italian bishop Luca Brandolini said, "I can't fight back the tears. This is the saddest moment in my life as a man, priest and bishop. It's a day of mourning, not just for me but for the many people who worked for the Second Vatican Council. A reform for which many people worked, with great sacrifice and only inspired by the desire to renew the Church, has now been cancelled."

Others expressed concern that the loosening of the restrictions for celebration of the Mass would cause practical problems for parish priests who might be pressured to offer the Mass according to the 1962 Missal, and that such pressure would "seem like a standard aimed at testing the priests' loyalty to the pope":

- Cardinal Castrillón responded to this concern by pointing out that the motu proprio does not oblige any priest to use the 1962 Missal: all that the parish priest or rector of a church is asked to do is to permit a stable group adhering to the earlier tradition and who have a priest disposed to use that Missal to celebrate Mass in the church.

In response to these concerns, a number of Bishops announced their intentions to issue guidance on how best to implement Summorum Pontificum in their dioceses in line with the motu proprio's rule that "Priests who use the Missal of Saint John XXIII must be qualified to do so".

- One of these was Bishop Donald W. Trautman of the Diocese of Erie, Pennsylvania, who indicated that those priests who celebrate such a Mass would first need to show that they have the requisite knowledge of its rubrics and of Latin.
- Cardinal Cormac Murphy-O'Connor, archbishop of Westminster, said: "On behalf of the bishops of England and Wales, I welcome the Holy Father's call for unity within the Church and especially toward those who are very attached to celebrating the Mass according to the Missal of 1962."
- Writer Damian Thompson, Editor-in-chief of the Catholic Herald and Telegraph journalist and blogger, claimed on 16 November 2007 that, as a result of the publication of Pope Benedict's document of 7 July 2007, "Cardinal Murphy-O'Connor was most displeased. Last week he hit back with a 'commentary' on Summorum Pontificum. According to Murphy-O'Connor, the ruling leaves the power of local bishops untouched. In fact, it removes the bishops' power to block the ancient liturgy; the cardinal is misrepresenting its contents."

=== Reactions of traditionalist Catholic groups ===
Various advocates for the Tridentine Mass voiced cautious optimism for the future and prepared for the practical aspects of the decision. In a statement, The Latin Mass Society of Ireland said: "We are very grateful to the Pope for enriching the life of the Church in this way and for enhancing legitimate liturgical diversity. In doing this Pope Benedict is building on the foundation laid by his predecessor Pope John Paul II in his 1988 motu proprio Ecclesia Dei Adflicta. The Latin Mass Society of England and Wales said: "Thirty-seven years ago, the Latin Mass Society was denounced by The Universe newspaper for its attachment to the Traditional Latin Rite under the banner headline, 'Latin Madness'. Today, the loyalty, determination and sufferings of the Traditional faithful have been vindicated by Pope Benedict XVI's wise and pastoral motu proprio. This [decision] puts an end to the discrimination, marginalisation and exclusion which, too often, Traditional Catholics have suffered. ...However, now is the time for the 'interior reconciliation in the heart of the Church' for which Pope Benedict calls".

==== SSPX ====
The traditionalist Society of Saint Pius X (SSPX), which was consulted by Pope Benedict during the process, said in a statement of the SSPX Superior General Bernard Fellay that it "extends its deep gratitude to the Sovereign Pontiff [Benedict] for this great spiritual benefit" and "rejoices to see the Church thus regain her liturgical Tradition, and give the possibility of a free access to the treasure of the Traditional Mass ... (for those) who had so far been deprived of it". The Society, however, points out that "difficulties still remain". It wishes that the "favorable climate established by the Holy See" will "make it possible to consider more serenely the disputed doctrinal issues" and that the decree of excommunication which still affects its bishops be withdrawn. Fellay adds: "The letter which accompanies the Motu Proprio does not hide however the difficulties that still remain", then stated that the Society is eager "after the decree of excommunication which still affects its bishops has been withdrawn—to consider more serenely the disputed doctrinal issues."

=== Russian Orthodox Patriarch ===
Patriarch Alexius II responded to the question, "The Pope has published a document restoring the possibility of using the Missal of Saint Pius V for celebrating the Eucharist. How do you judge this decision?", by saying: "Recovering and recognizing the value of ancient liturgical tradition is something we welcome. We hold very strongly to tradition. Without the faithful guardianship of liturgical tradition, the Russian Orthodox Church would not have been able to resist the period of persecution."

=== Jewish reaction ===
The Jewish Anti-Defamation League (ADL) attacked the document, because the text of the Good Friday Prayer for the Jews in the 1962 Missal includes a request to God to "lift the veil" from Jewish hearts and to show mercy, according to one translation, "even to the Jews" (or "also to the Jews"), and refers to "the blindness of that people" (to Christ). Other objections were raised in the mistaken belief that the pre-1960 form of the Prayer for the Jews that was included in the original form of the Tridentine Mass was being restored, a form that spoke of "the faithless Jews" (pro perfidis Iudaeis), which some interpreted as meaning "the perfidious Jews". Pope John XXIII replaced this prayer in 1959, so that it does not appear in the missal permitted by Summorum Pontificum. The American Jewish Committee (AJC) stated in a press release:

We acknowledge that the Church's liturgy is an internal Catholic matter and this motu proprio from Pope Benedict XVI is based on the permission given by John Paul II in 1988 and thus, on principle, is nothing new. However we are naturally concerned about how wider use of this Tridentine liturgy may impact upon how Jews are perceived and treated. We appreciate that the motu proprio actually limits the use of the Latin Mass in the days prior to Easter, which addresses the reference in the Good Friday liturgy concerning the Jews. [...] However, it is still not clear that this qualification applies to all situations and we have called on the Vatican to contradict the negative implications that some in the Jewish community and beyond have drawn concerning the motu proprio.

In response to such continued complaints, Pope Benedict XVI in 2008 replaced the prayer in the 1962 Missal with a newly composed prayer that makes no mention of blindness or darkness.

== Benedict XVI's 2008 commentary ==
In a 2008 interview in during his flight to France, Benedict XVI said Summorum Pontificum "is merely an act of tolerance, with a pastoral aim, for those people who were brought up with this liturgy, who love it, are familiar with it and want to live with this liturgy. They form a small group, because this presupposes a schooling in Latin, a training in a certain culture. Yet for these people, to have the love and tolerance to let them live with this liturgy seems to me a normal requirement of the faith and pastoral concern of any Bishop of our Church. There is no opposition between the liturgy renewed by the Second Vatican Council and this liturgy."

== Universae Ecclesiae ==
With the approval of Pope Benedict XVI, the Pontifical Commission Ecclesia Dei issued the instruction Universae Ecclesiae of 30 April 2011, feast of Saint Pius V, to clarify some aspects of Summorum Pontificum.

The normative part of the document (nn.12-35) contains 23 brief points on various arguments. It reaffirms the competence of the diocesan bishops in implementing the motu proprio, recalling that in the event of a dispute about the celebration in forma extraordinaria judgement falls to the Ecclesia Dei Commission. It clarifies the concept of coetus fidelium (in short "group of faithful") stabiliter existens ("stable") whose desire to participate in the celebration of the forma extraordinaria must be welcomed and accepted by pastors. While leaving the assessment of the number of people required for its establishment to the wise judgement of pastors, it states that the group does not necessarily have to be composed of persons belonging to a single parish, but may result from people who come together from different parishes or even from other dioceses. While always taking into account compliance with wider pastoral needs, the Instruction proposes a spirit of "generous welcome" towards groups of faithful who request the forma extraordinaria or priests who request to occasionally celebrate in such a form with some of the faithful. The clarification (n.19) according to which the faithful who request the celebration in forma extraordinaria "must not in any way support or belong to groups that show themselves to be contrary to the validity or legitimacy of forma ordinaria" and/or authority of the Pope, is most important. This would be in flagrant contradiction to the motu proprio's very aim of "reconciliation". Priests must have a sufficient knowledge of Latin and know the rite to be celebrated. Bishops are therefore encouraged to make proper formation for this purpose available in seminaries, and the possibility of recourse, if there are no other suitable priests, to the collaboration of priests from the Institutes set up by the Ecclesia Dei Commission (which normally use the forma extraordinaria) is also indicated. The use of the 1962 forms of conferring Holy Orders is permitted only in those institutes that exclusively celebrate the 1962 Missal that are under the Pontifical Commission Ecclesia Dei.

Article 8 specified the aims of Summorum Pontificum as:

1. offering to all the faithful the Roman Liturgy in the Usus Antiquior, considered as a precious treasure to be preserved;
2. effectively guaranteeing and ensuring the use of the forma extraordinaria for all who ask for it, given that the use of the 1962 Roman Liturgy is a faculty generously granted for the good of the faithful and therefore is to be interpreted in a sense favourable to the faithful who are its principal addressees;
3. promoting reconciliation at the heart of the Church.

Other sections include:

- On diocesan bishops:
  14. It is the task of the Diocesan Bishop to undertake all necessary measures to ensure respect for the forma extraordinaria of the Roman Rite, according to the Motu Proprio Summorum Pontificum.
- On the coetus fidelium ("group of the faithful"):
  19. The faithful who ask for the celebration of the forma extraordinaria must not in any way support or belong to groups which show themselves to be against the validity or legitimacy of the Holy Mass or the Sacraments celebrated in the forma ordinaria or against the Roman Pontiff as Supreme Pastor of the Universal Church.
  The head of the Holy See's Press Office, Father Federico Lombardi called this clarification "most important".
- On sacerdos idoneus:
  20. With respect to the question of the necessary requirements for a priest to be held idoneus ("qualified") to celebrate in the forma extraordinaria, the following is hereby stated:
  1. Every Catholic priest who is not impeded by Canon Law is to be considered idoneus ("qualified") for the celebration of the Holy Mass in the forma extraordinaria.
  2. Regarding the use of the Latin language, a basic knowledge is necessary, allowing the priest to pronounce the words correctly and understand their meaning.
  3. Regarding knowledge of the execution of the Rite, priests are presumed to be qualified who present themselves spontaneously to celebrate the forma extraordinaria, and have celebrated it previously.
  21. Ordinaries are asked (Note: The Latin text, which is the juridically official text, adds the adverb enixe (strongly), absent in the Italian text, which is probably the original, and also in the official translations in French, English, German, Portuguese and Spanish.) to offer their clergy the possibility of acquiring adequate preparation for celebrations in the forma extraordinaria. This applies also to Seminaries, where future priests should be given proper formation, including study of Latin and, where pastoral needs suggest it, the opportunity to learn the forma extraordinaria of the Roman Rite.
- On norms of law later than 1962:

27. With regard to the disciplinary norms connected to celebration, the ecclesiastical discipline contained in the Code of Canon Law of 1983 applies.
28. Furthermore, by virtue of its character of special law, within its own area, the Motu Proprio Summorum Pontificum derogates from those provisions of law, connected with the sacred Rites, promulgated from 1962 onwards and incompatible with the rubrics of the liturgical books in effect in 1962.

- On the Triduum Sacrum:
  33. If there is a qualified priest, a coetus fidelium ("group of faithful") which follows the older liturgical tradition can also celebrate the Sacred Triduum in the forma extraordinaria. When there is no church or oratory designated exclusively for such celebrations, the parish priest or Ordinary, in agreement with the qualified priest, should find some arrangement favourable to the good of souls, not excluding the possibility of a repetition of the celebration of the Sacred Triduum in the same church.

== Abrogation ==
On 16 July 2021, Pope Francis issued a motu proprio entitled Traditionis custodes and an accompanying letter that replaced the conditions delineated by Summorum Pontificum for the celebration of the 1962 Roman Missal and in particular declared that it is the exclusive right of the diocesan bishop with the approbation of the Holy See, not of individual priests, to authorize its use. Traditionis custodes further stated that now "the liturgical books promulgated by Saint Paul VI and Saint John Paul II, in conformity with the decrees of Vatican Council II, are the unique expression of the lex orandi of the Roman Rite". This changes the position of the Mass of Paul VI from the "ordinary" expression of the Roman Rite to the only current expression.

On 29 June 2022, Pope Francis's motu proprio Desiderio desideravi was released. In it, Francis explained he published Traditionis custodes because some people accepted Vatican II but rejected the liturgical reforms that followed it which had been promulgated by Paul VI and John Paul II. He added that since Sacrosanctum Concilium "expresses the reality of the liturgy", he had stressed in Traditionis custodes that the reformed Vatican II liturgy is "the unique expression of the lex orandi of the Roman Rite". He stated he was determined to make it so that "unity be re-established in the whole Church of the Roman Rite".

In February 2023, Pope Francis issued a rescript, clarifying that bishops must obtain authorization from the Holy See before granting permission for parish churches to be used for Eucharistic celebrations with the preconciliar rite and before allowing priests ordained after 16 July 2021 to use the 1962 Roman Missal.

== See also ==
- Preconciliar rites after the Second Vatican Council
