= Vatican Publishing House =

Publisher established by the Holy See, 1926

Vatican Publishing House Libreria Editrice Vaticana Officina libraria editoria Vaticana
- Founded: 1926; 100 years ago in Rome, Italy
- Founder: Pope Pius XI
- Country of origin: Vatican City
- Publication types: Books, papal bulls, encyclicals
- Official website: libreriaeditricevaticana.va

The Vatican Publishing House (Italian: Libreria Editrice Vaticana; Latin: Officina libraria editoria Vaticana; LEV) is a publisher established by the Holy See in 1926. It is responsible for publishing official documents of the Roman Catholic Church, including Papal bulls, event records, and encyclicals, as well as certain Secret Archive documents. On 27 June 2015, Pope Francis decreed that the Vatican Publishing House would eventually be incorporated into a newly established Secretariat for Communication in the Roman Curia.

== History ==
In 1926, the library was separated from the printing and transformed into autonomous body that was entrusted with the sale of books that were being made to print by the Holy See.

The Apostolic constitution Pastor bonus of Pope John Paul II (28 June 1988) classified the LEV as an institution affiliated with the Holy See.

== Description ==
It has its own constitution and its own rules. The statutes of LEV, Article 2, states: "The Libreria Editrice Vaticana has the fundamental aim of publishing the documents of the Supreme Pontiff and the Holy See."

The company owns the copyright to all the writings of the Pope, but did not start enforcing the copyright until the accession of Pope Benedict XVI. The policy was announced on 31 May 2005. La Stampa was the first to pay royalties to the Vatican publisher, and the Union of Catholic Booksellers and Publishers protested the Vatican policy, which applied to texts no older than fifty years. The LEV's policy has been summarized as:

[N]ews organizations can quote from the pope's speeches, encyclicals and other writings without charge. They can also publish full texts free provided they cite Vatican copyright ... but if a text is published separately ... payment is due.

== See also ==
- List of papal bulls
- List of Encyclicals of Pope Pius XI
- List of Encyclicals of Pope Pius XII
- List of Encyclicals of Pope John XXIII
- List of Encyclicals of Pope Paul VI
- List of Encyclicals of Pope John Paul II
- List of Encyclicals of Pope Benedict XVI
