= 677 =

Calendar year

677 in various calendars
Gregorian calendar	677; DCLXXVII
Ab urbe condita	1430
Armenian calendar	126; ԹՎ ՃԻԶ
Assyrian calendar	5427
Balinese saka calendar	598–599
Bengali calendar	83–84
Berber calendar	1627
Buddhist calendar	1221
Burmese calendar	39
Byzantine calendar	6185–6186
Chinese calendar	丙子年 (Fire Rat); 3374 or 3167 — to — 丁丑年 (Fire Ox); 3375 or 3168
Coptic calendar	393–394
Discordian calendar	1843
Ethiopian calendar	669–670
Hebrew calendar	4437–4438
- Hindu calendars
Vikram Samvat	733–734
Shaka Samvat	598–599
Kali Yuga	3777–3778
Holocene calendar	10677
Iranian calendar	55–56
Islamic calendar	57–58
Japanese calendar	Hakuchi 28 (白雉２８年)
Javanese calendar	569–570
Julian calendar	677; DCLXXVII
Korean calendar	3010
Minguo calendar	1235 before ROC 民前1235年
Nanakshahi calendar	−791
Seleucid era	988/989 AG
Thai solar calendar	1219–1220
Tibetan calendar	མེ་ཕོ་བྱི་བ་ལོ་ (male Fire-Rat); 803 or 422 or −350 — to — མེ་མོ་གླང་ལོ་ (female Fire-Ox); 804 or 423 or −349

Year 677 (DCLXXVII) was a common year starting on Thursday of the Julian calendar. The denomination 677 for this year has been used since the early medieval period, when the Anno Domini calendar era became the prevalent method in Europe for naming years.

== Events ==
=== By place ===
==== Europe ====
- The Onogur Bulgars are scattered by the Khazars, who then establish a great Steppe empire, centered on the Lower Volga. The Onogurs depart to the Pannonian Plain.
- Warinus, Frankish nobleman, is stoned to death near Arras, because of a feud between his brother, Leodegar (bishop of Autun), and Ebroin, the Mayor of the Palace of Neustria.
- 25 – 27 July: Climax of the Siege of Thessalonica: Slavic forces launch a large-scale assault on the city walls, but are repelled.

==== Asia ====
- Tang China declares the deposed Bojang of Goguryeo "King of Joseon", placing him in charge of the Liaodong area under the Protectorate General to Pacify the East.

==== Americas ====
- At Pulil, the army of Calakmul vanquishes the insurgency led by Nuun Ujol Chaak, meaning Bʼalaj Chan Kʼawiil is able to return to rule Dos Pilas, from his exile in the kingdom of Hix Witz.

== Births ==
- Abdallah ibn Abd al-Malik, Arab general (approximate date)
- Clovis IV, King of the Franks (d. 694)
- Nanyue Huairang, Chinese Zen Buddhist patriarch (d. 744)

== Deaths ==
- Constantine I, patriarch of Constantinople
- Drest VI, king of the Picts
- Vincent Madelgarius, Frankish monk
- Warinus, Frankish nobleman
