= Hesychius =

Hesychius (Ancient Greek: Ἡσύχιος, romanized: Hēsúkhios, lit. 'the quiet one') may refer to:

- Hesychius of Cazorla (first century), Spanish Christian missionary, bishop, martyr and saint
- Hesychius of Antioch (fourth century), Antioch saint
- Hesychius of Sinai (fourth century), Byzantine hieromonk and author
- Hesychius of Alexandria (probably fifth century), Alexandrian lexicographer
- Hesychius (third–fourth century), Egyptian bishop and Christian martyr and saint to whom is attributed a recension of the Septuagint; said to be the same as Hesychius of Alexandria, Alexandrian writer
- Hesychius of Jerusalem (probably fifth century), Jerusalem Christian presbyter and exegete
- Hesychius I (bishop of Vienne) (fifth century), French bishop and saint
- Hesychius II (bishop of Vienne) (sixth century), French bishop and saint
- Hesychius I (bishop of Grenoble) (sixth century), French bishop
- Hesychius of Miletus (sixth century), Greek chronicler and biographer
