= Hesychius I (bishop of Grenoble) =

Hesychius or Isicius (French: Isice; died c. 601) was a bishop of Grenoble at the end of the 6th century.

== Life ==
Hesychius was a member of "one of the principal Gallo-Roman families of 'Bourgogne'", the Hesychii, a branch of the Syagrii, several others of whom were likewise bishops of either Grenoble (including Syagrius I, Syagrius II and Hesychius II) or Vienne (including Hesychius I, Saint Avitus and Hesychius II).

The dates of his episcopacy are not precisely known but have been estimated as from 573 to 601.

Hesychius was a signatory of several Merovingian councils called by King Guntram: Council of Paris (573), First Council of Mâcon (581), Council of Lyon (583), Council of Valence (584), Second Council of Mâcon (585).

He was one of the bishops gathered at Poitiers before pronouncing on the nuns of the Abbaye Sainte-Croix who had rebelled in 589 and 590.

Hesychius apparently died in or shortly after 601.

== Sources ==
- Bligny, Bernard (1979). "Histoire des diocèses de France: Grenoble". Histoire des Diocèses de France (in French). 12. Paris: Éditions Beauchesne. ISSN 0336-0539.
- Le Camus, M le Cardinal Etienne (1868). Chevalier, Ulysse (ed.). Catalogue des évêques de Grenoble (in French). Grenoble: Imprimerie de Prudhomme.
- Duchesne, Louis (1907). Fastes épiscopaux de l'ancienne Gaule. Provinces du Sud-Est (tome premier) (in French) (2nd ed.). Paris: Albert Fontemoing. Anc. Thorin et fils.
- Pontal, Odette (1989). Konziliengeschichte: Die Synoden im Merowingerreich (in German). Paderborn: Ferdinand Schöningh. ISBN 3-506-74684-7.
