= Leudwinus =

Archbishop of Treves and Archbishop of Laon

Saint Leudwinus
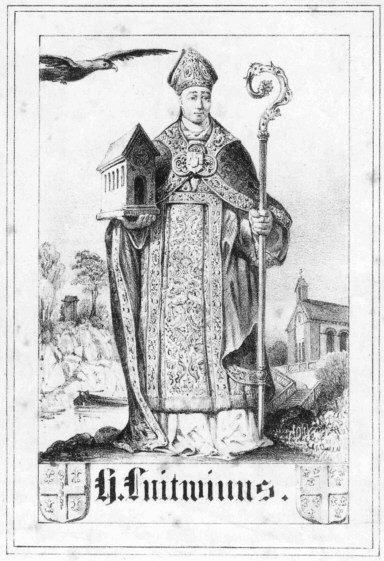
- Saint Lietwinus of Treves

Archbishop of Treves
- Born: c. 660; Mettlach (today Merzig-Wadern, Saarland, Germany)
- Died: September 29, 722 (aged 61–62); Treves, Austrasia (today Rhineland-Palatinate, Germany)
- Venerated in: Roman Catholic Church; Eastern Orthodox Church
- Major shrine: Lutwinuskirche, Mettlach Abbey
- Feast: September 29
- Attributes: Eagle

Saint Leudwinus, Count of Treves (Ecclesiastical Latin: [ˈlɛu̯d.vi.nus]; also Leodewin, Liutwin, Ludwin, etc.; c. 660 – 29 September 722 AD in Reims) founded an abbey in Mettlach. He was Archbishop of Treves and Laon. As patron saint of the Mettlach parish, his relics are carried through the town by procession at the annual Pentecost celebration. His feast day is September 29. He was the son of Saint Warinus, the paternal grandson of Saint Sigrada, and nephew of Saint Leodegarius.

== Early life ==
Leudwinus was born a Frankish nobleman and was a member of one of the most powerful clans in Austrasia. His parents were Warinus, Count of Poitiers and Gunza of Metz. Lambert of Maastricht was his kinsman. His Frankish name is Liutwin. Leudwinus spent his early life at the royal court of Austrasia and was styled Count of Treves. He received his education from his maternal uncle, Saint Basinus, Archbishop of Treves. In 697, Leudwinus signed the Deed of Echternach with his uncle.

== Marriage ==
Initially uninterested in an ecclesiastical career, Leudwinus married Willigard of Bavaria. Their children were:

- Milo, Count of Treves
- Wido, Count of Hornbach
- (Possibly) Chrotrude of Treves (Rotrude), who married Charles Martel and became Duchess of Austrasia.

== Mettlach Abbey ==
According to legend, the abbey in Mettlach was founded after Leudwinus went hunting near Saar. He grew tired and fell asleep under the shade of a tree. As he slept the sun changed positions exposing him to its hot rays, but an eagle swept down and sat on Leudwinus with its wings spread out. When Leudwinus woke up, his servant told him how the eagle had protected him from being burnt by the sun. Coincidentally, Leudwinus happened to be napping at the site of the Miracle Eagle near the chapel of St. Denis of Paris. Leudwinus saw this as a God-sent sign to establish a Benedictine monastery at that site, and it soon developed into a Christian missionary center. At the location of the original Dionysius Chapel now stands the parish church of St. Gangolf in Mettlach.

When Leudwinus became a widower, he joined the monastery he founded at Mettlach as a simple monk.

== Bishop of Triers ==
In 697, Leudwinus was appointed coadjutor of his uncle Basinus von Trier. In 698, he cofounded the Echternack Abbey at Mettlach.

When Archbishop Basinus died on 4 March 705, Leudwinus succeeded him and was consecrated Archbishop of Treve. Leudwinus was also appointed bishop of Laon. This made him one of the most important church dignitaries of the time in the Frankish kingdom.

== Death ==
Leudwinus died on the 29th of September 722 at Reims. He was succeeded as Archbishop of Treve by his son, Milo, who brought his father's remains to Treve for burial. However, local customs prevented this, so Leudwinus' family decided to let the dead saint choose his own place of burial. His coffin was placed on a ship without a crew. It sailed by itself first to Moselle, then Saar, and finally docked at Mettlach, where the church bells began to ring. Leudwinus was buried in St. Mary's Church at the Abbey at Mettlach. In 990, St. Mary's Church was replaced by a new structure called the Old Tower, the oldest preserved stone building in Saar.

In 1247, Leudwinus' relics were transferred to the newly constructed Leudwinus Chapel (Liutwinuskapelle). Some 200 years later, his remains were reburied again in a new chapel connected to the abbey church. During the French Revolution, the monastery was purchased by the Boch family, who had the building demolished and built Liutwinus Cathedral in Mettlach, where the relics of the saint are located today. Reports of miracles at Leudwinus' grave in Mettlach have made it a popular pilgrimage site over the centuries.

Records from Leudwinus' time as bishop are collected in the Gesta Treverorum.

== Feast Day of St. Leudwinus ==
Leudwinus' original feast day was September 29, the day of his death. As this is also the feast day of Saint Michael the Archangel, after the Second Vatican Council the Feast of Saint Leudwinus was moved to September 23. It is also the feast day of his uncle, Saint Basinus.

== Literature ==
- Georg Gresser: History of the Diocese of Speyer to the end of the 11th Century (Geschichte des Bistums Speyer bis zum Ende des 11. Jahrhunderts) Quellen und Abhandlungen zur Mittelrheinischen Kirchengeschichte Band 89. Mainz 1998.
- Georg Gresser: Liutwin. In: Church and Theology Lexicon. Band 6. Freiburg 1997, Sp. 1009.
- Andreas Heinz: Saints in the Saarland (Heilige im Saarland) 2. Auflage. Saarbrücker Druck und Verlag, Saarbrücken 1991, ISBN 3-925036-44-X.
- Franz Xaver Kraus: Ludwin. In: General German Biography(Allgemeine Deutsche Biographie) (ADB). Band 19, Duncker & Humblot, Leipzig 1884, S. 616 f.
- Martin Persch (1993). "Liutwin (Ludwin, Leodewinus)". In Bautz, Traugott (ed.). Biographisch-Bibliographisches Kirchenlexikon (BBKL) (in German). Vol. 5. Herzberg: Bautz. col. 143. ISBN 3-88309-043-3.
- Friedrich Schneider: The Relics of the Holy Lutwinus to Mettlach (Die Trinkschale des Heiligen Lutwinus zu Mettlach). Von Zabern, Mainz 1905 (Digitalisat)
- Constantin von Briesen: Historical Documents of the Merzig-Wadern Circle (Urkundliche Geschichte des Kreises Merzig-Wadern) Franz Stein, Saarlouis 1863.

Catholic Church titles
Preceded by St. Basinus	Archbishop of Treves; 4 March 705 – 29 September 722	Succeeded by Milo
