= Hesychius II (bishop of Vienne) =

Bishop of Vienne, France

Saint Hesychius or Isicius (French: Isice; died c. 565) was a bishop of Vienne from about 545 to his death. He is venerated as a saint in the Catholic church.

== Life ==
Hesychius is mentioned as a Metropolitan Bishop of Vienna in the catalog of Bishop Adon of Vienna (799-875).

According to the historian Bernard Bligny (1979), Hesychius belonged to "one of the principal Gallo-Roman families of 'Bourgogne', the Hesychii, a branch of the Syagrii", of whom several members were bishops of either Vienne and Grenoble.

Archbishop Leger of Vienne recorded in his Liber Episcopalis Viennensis Ecclesiae (1060) that Hesychius took part in the Fifth Council of Orléans in 549 (noted as "Eutychius") and in the Council of Paris in 552.

He is believed to have died in about 565. He was buried by his sister Marcellina near the tomb of Saint Avitus. According to his epitaph he had been a quaestor before being elected bishop, as did his predecessor, Pantagathus.

== Cultus ==
Hesychius' cultus as a saint was attested in the 15th-century calendar of Vienne and was confirmed by Pope Pius X by decree dated 9 December 1903.

His eulogy is in the Roman Martyrology for 12 November, his feast day. He is also celebrated together with Saint Martin and all the bishop saints of Vienne on 1 July.

== See also ==
- Hesychius I (bishop of Vienne)

== Sources ==
- Bligny, Bernard (1979). Histoire des diocèses de France:Grenoble (in French). Vol. 12. Paris: Éditions Beauchesne. p. 22.
- Il martirologio romano. Riformato a norma dei decreti del Concilio ecumenico Vaticano II e promulgato da papa Giovanni Paolo II, LEV, Città del Vaticano 2004
- Congregatio de Causis Sanctorum, Index ac status causarum, Città del Vaticano 1999
- Filippo Caraffa and Giuseppe Morelli (eds.), Bibliotheca Sanctorum (BSS), 12 vols., Istituto Giovanni XXIII nella Pontificia Università Lateranense, Roma 1961-1969
