= Fuscina =

Fuscina was an early Christian ascetic woman and the sister of Avitus, Bishop of Vienne.

Fuscina was dedicated to Christianity from birth, known as child oblation, and would follow a life of chastity. She confirmed her vows at the age of ten, as documented in De consolatoria castitatis laude ('Concerning the Consolatory Praise of Chastity') (lines 59–62). He wrote De consolatoria laude castitatis to Fuscina around the end of the fifth or early sixth centuries CE. This is the name Avitus himself gives to the poem in his dedicatory letter to Bishop Apollinaris of Valence, his brother. Avitus wrote De consolatoria to reinforce Fuscina's dedication to the radical religious commitment she had made by presenting her with a model of female, spiritual heroism. Using exemplar from Scripture to prove the capacity for female spiritual strength, Avitus delivered a poem that refused to allow the forbearance of his sister and all Christian women to crumble.

== Critical editions ==
- Nicole Hecquet-Noti, Avit de Vienne, Éloge consolatoire de la chasteté (Sur la virginité), SC 546 (Paris, 2011) [Introduction 9–93]

== Bibliography ==
- Nicole Hecquet-Noti, “Vertus de la moniale, vertus royales: Bible et réception du De virginitate d’Avit de Vienne,” Poésie et Bible aux IVe–VIe s.: Actes de la session scientifique de l’Assemblée générale de l’Association ‘Textes pour l’Histoire de l’Antiquité Tardive, Paris, École des Chartes 8 octobre 2016, ed. Michele Cutino, Revue des Études tardo-antiques, Supplément 4 (2017), 135–46
- Michael Roberts, 'Advice to a Sister: Avitus on Chastity (De consolatoria castitatis laude)' Traditio. 2023;78:1-16
