= Chalcedon =

Chalcedon Χαλκηδών
- Town
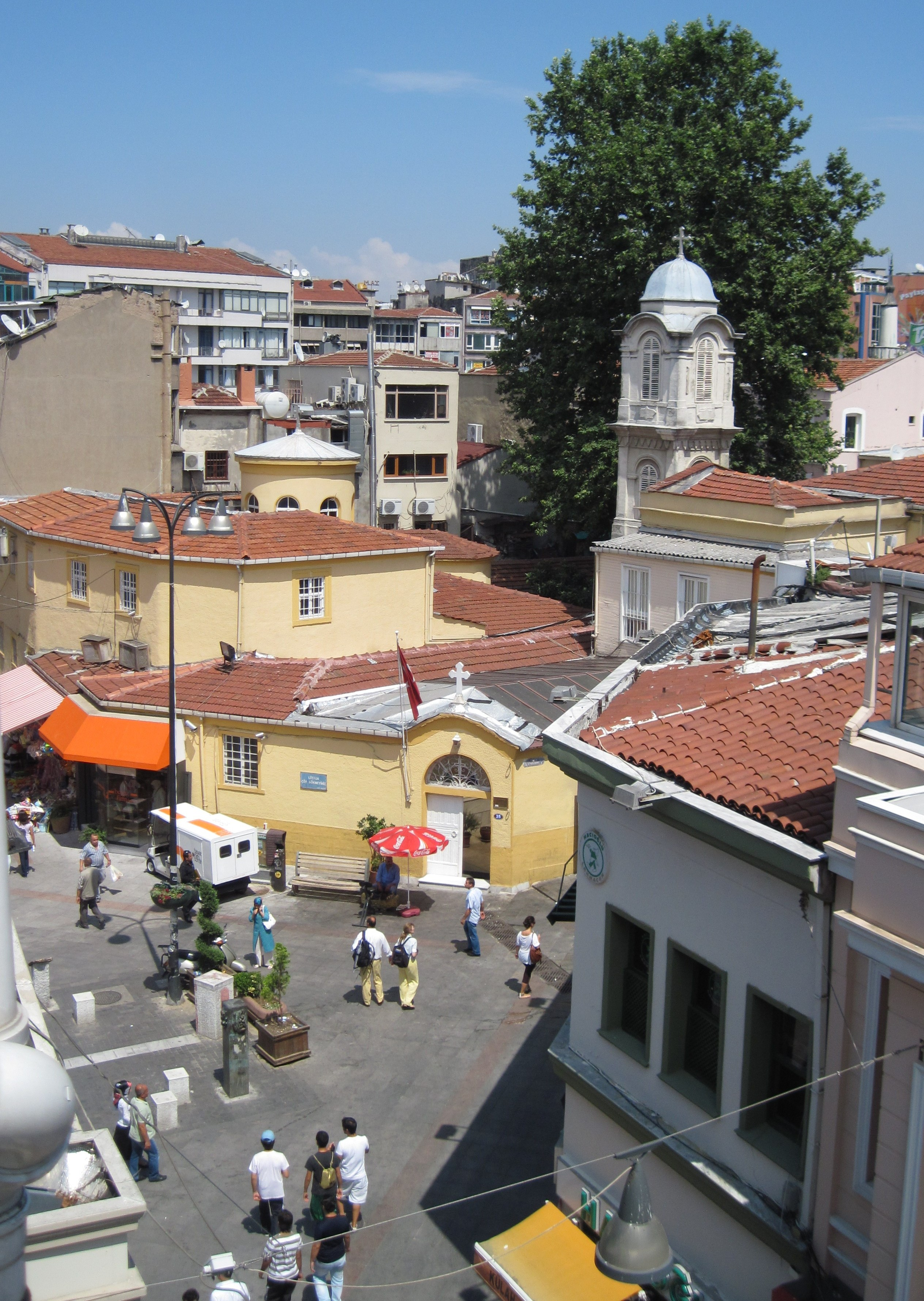
- The Church of St. Euphemia, which serves as the Greek Orthodox cathedral of the Metropolitan Diocese, was named after Saint Euphemia the All-praised, a virgin martyr who died in Chalcedon for her faith in 303 AD
- Etymology: Carthage
- Bithynia as part of Bithynia and Pontus, a province of the Roman Empire, 120 AD
- Coordinates: 40°59′04″N 29°01′38″E
- Country: Bithynia
- Established: Prehistoric times

Chalcedon marked on a map of Istanbul

Chalcedon (/ˈkælsɪˌdɒn, kælˈsiːdən/; Ancient Greek: Χαλκηδών, romanized: Khalkēdṓn) was an ancient maritime town of Bithynia, in Asia Minor. It was located to the south of Chrysopolis (later known as Scutari, modern Üsküdar) and almost directly opposite Byzantium across the Bosporus strait, in Europe. At present, it is a district of the city of Istanbul named Kadıköy.

The substructures of ancient Greek buildings in Chalcedon dating from the 5th century BC are currently being excavated in the area behind the Haydarpaşa railway station, while the remnants of an older Phoenician port have been discovered in the Moda quarter. The artifacts uncovered at Altıyol and other excavation sites are on display at the Istanbul Archaeological Museum. Further inland, but still within the borders of the modern Kadıköy district, the Fikirtepe mound (which has disappeared underneath buildings) from the Chalcolithic period (c. 5500 BC), discovered in 1908, contained the oldest-known human settlement in Istanbul for almost a century, until the discovery in 2004 of the Yenikapı settlement from the Neolithic period (c. 6500 BC) on the European side of the city, during the excavation works of the Yenikapı Transfer Center of the Istanbul Metro.

The site of Chalcedon is located on a small peninsula on the north coast of the Sea of Marmara, near the mouth of the Bosporus strait. A stream, called the Chalcis or Chalcedon in antiquity and known today as Kurbağalıdere (meaning "Frog Brook" or literally "Brook with frog(s)" in Turkish), flows into Fenerbahçe Bay. There, Greek colonists from Megara in Attica founded the settlement of Chalcedon in 685 BC, some seventeen years before Byzantium.

== Etymology ==
The Greek name of the ancient town was derived from its earlier Phoenician name Qart-ħadaʃt, meaning "New Town", whence Karkhēd(ōn), similar to the names of Carthage and Cartagena which were derived from the same Phoenician name.

The ancient Greek name of Chalcedon is attested in two principal forms: Καλχηδών (Kalkhedon) and Χαλκηδών (Chalkedon). The form Καλχηδών was particularly common in antiquity and is found almost consistently in inscriptions. The Doric form of the name, Καλχαδών, is also attested on the city's coinage. Over time, Χαλκηδών became the more prevalent spelling, from which the Latinised form Chalcedon derives.

Several ancient traditions offer explanations for the origin of the name. According to one account, the city was named after Chalcedon, a son of Cronus (or Zeus in another version). A river in the vicinity, identified with the modern Kurbagalıdere, was first named after this figure, and the city subsequently received the same name. Other ancient explanations associated the name with a son of the seer Calchas, or with Chalkis, identified as a daughter of Archimedes. Another proposed explanation connects the name with the area's mineral deposits. Hesychius mentions another tradition associating the city's name with the Euboean city of Chalkis, whose inhabitants were said to have founded the settlement. These colonists were later known as the "Blind Ones" because, according to tradition, they had failed to recognise the more advantageous location of nearby Byzantion. However, this account most probably reflects a conflation of different traditions.

In his Naturalis historia, Pliny the Elder states that Chalcedon was first named Procerastis, which may have derived from a point of land near it; then it was named Colpusa, probably after the harbour; and finally Caecorum Oppidum, or the "Town of the Blind", which is the translation in Latin of an earlier Greek nickname of the city. According to Herodotus, Chalcedon (established by colonists from Megara c. 685 BC) became known as the "City of the Blind" because the site was so obviously inferior to that of Byzantium (established later by the Megarians, c. 667 BC) on the opposite shore of the Bosporus strait.

The mineral chalcedony is named after the city.

== Prehistory ==
The mound of Fikirtepe has yielded remains dating to the Chalcolithic period (c. 5500–3500 BC) and attests to a continuous settlement since prehistoric times. Phoenicians were active traders in this area.

== Megarian colony ==
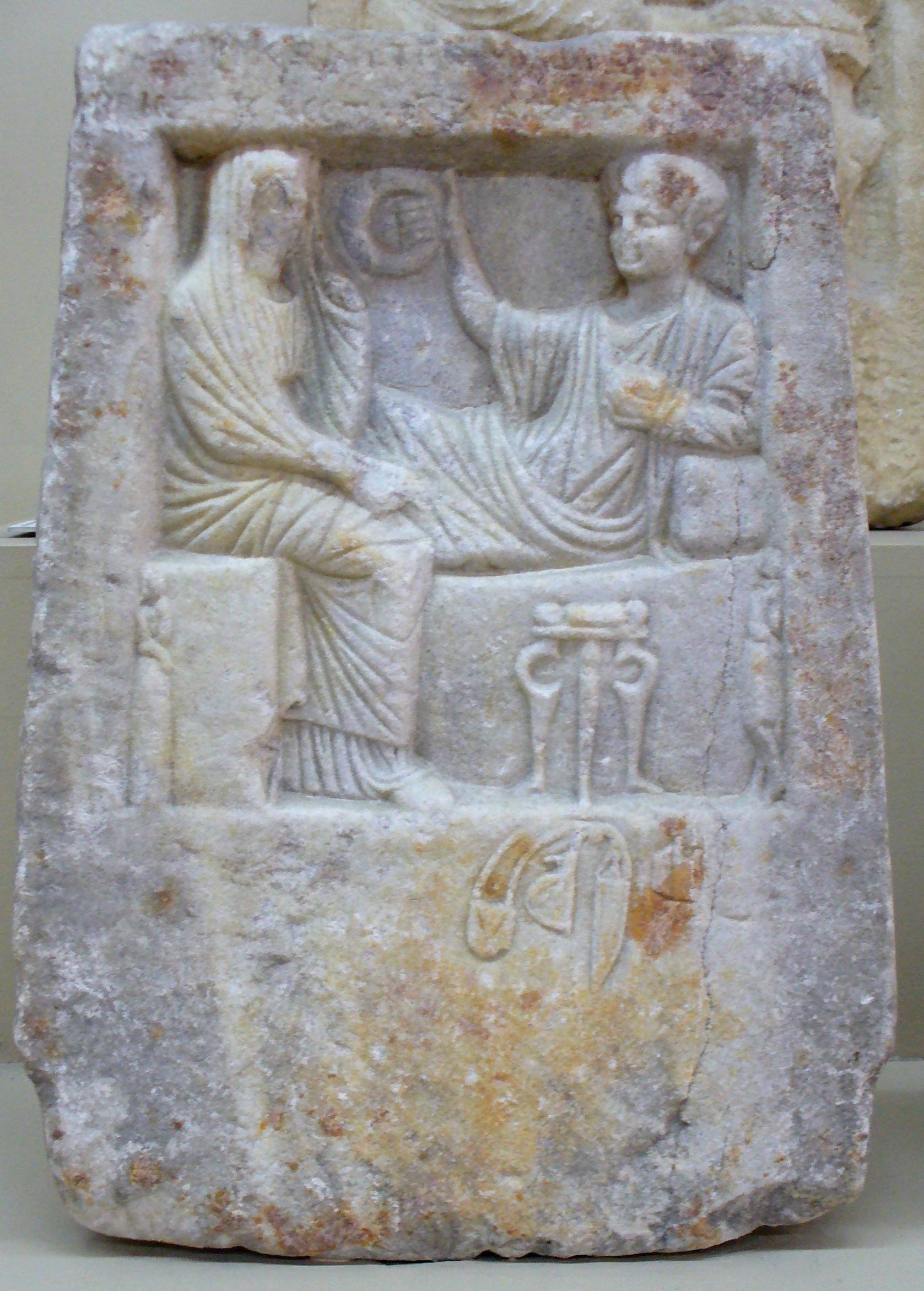
Funerary stele from the 1st century BC

Chalcedon originated as a Megarian colony in 685 BC. The colonists from Megara settled on a site that was viewed in antiquity as so obviously inferior to that visible on the opposite shore of the Bosphorus, that the 6th-century BC Persian general Megabazus allegedly remarked that Chalcedon's founders must have been blind. Indeed, Strabo and Pliny relate that the oracle of Apollo told the Athenians and Megarians who founded Byzantium in 657 BC to build their city "opposite to the blind", and that they interpreted "the blind" to mean Chalcedon, the "City of the Blind".

Nevertheless, trade thrived in Chalcedon; the town flourished and built many temples, including one to Apollo, which had an oracle. Chalcedonia, the territory dependent upon Chalcedon, stretched up the Anatolian shore of the Bosphorus at least as far as the temple of Zeus Urius, now the site of Yoros Castle, and may have included the north shore of the Gulf of Astacus which extends towards Nicomedia. Important villages in Chalcedonia included Chrysopolis (the modern Üsküdar) and Panteicheion (Pendik). Strabo notes that "a little above the sea" in Chalcedonia lies "the fountain Azaritia, which contains small crocodiles".

In its early history Chalcedon shared the fortunes of Byzantium. Later, the 6th-century BC Persian satrap Otanes captured it. The city vacillated for a long while between the Lacedaemonian and the Athenian interests. Darius the Great's bridge of boats, built in 512 BC for his Scythian campaign, extended from Chalcedonia to Thrace. Chalcedon formed a part of the kingdom of Bithynia, whose king Nicomedes willed Bithynia to the Romans upon his death in 74 BC.

== Roman city ==
The city was partly destroyed by Mithridates. The governor of Bithynia, Cotta, had fled to Chalcedon for safety along with thousands of other Romans. Three thousand of them were killed, sixty ships captured, and four ships destroyed in Mithridates' assault on the city.

During the Empire, Chalcedon recovered, and was given the status of a free city. It fell under the repeated attacks of the barbarian hordes who crossed over after having ravaged Byzantium, including some referred to as Scythians who attacked during the reign of Valerian and Gallienus in the mid 3rd century.

== Byzantine and Ottoman suburbs ==
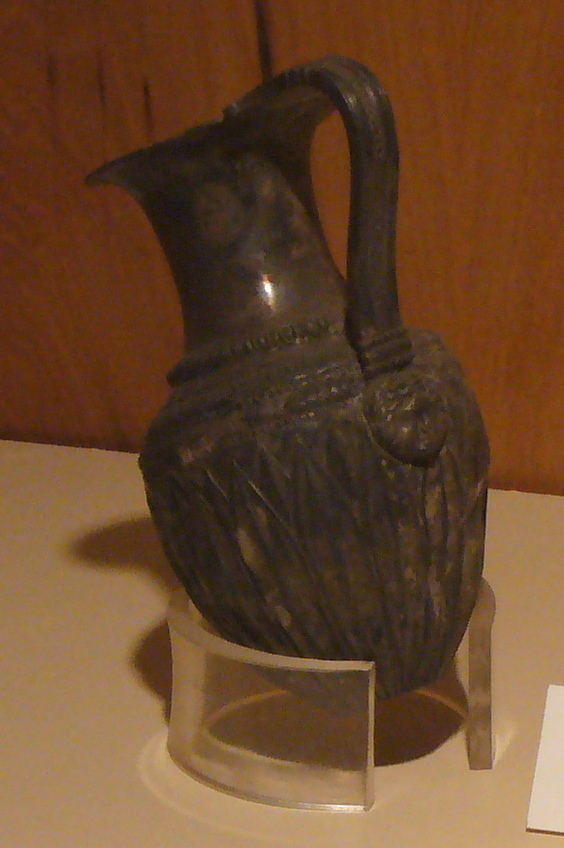
Small silver jug from Chalcedon

Chalcedon suffered somewhat from its proximity to the new imperial capital at Constantinople. First the Byzantines and later the Ottoman Turks used it as a quarry for building materials for Constantinople's monumental structures. Chalcedon also fell repeatedly to armies attacking Constantinople from the east.

In 361 AD, it was the location of the Chalcedon tribunal, where Julian the Apostate brought his enemies to trial.

In 451 AD, an ecumenical council of Christian leaders convened here. See below for this Council of Chalcedon.

The general Belisarius probably spent his years of retirement on his estate of Rufinianae in Chalcedonia.

Beginning in 616 and for at least a decade thereafter, Chalcedon furnished an encampment to the Persians under Chosroes II (cf. Siege of Constantinople (626)). It later fell for a time to the Arabs under Yazid (cf. Siege of Constantinople (674)).

Chalcedon was badly damaged during the Fourth Crusade (1204). It came definitively under Ottoman rule under Orhan Gazi a century before the Ottoman conquest of Constantinople.

== Ecclesiastical history ==
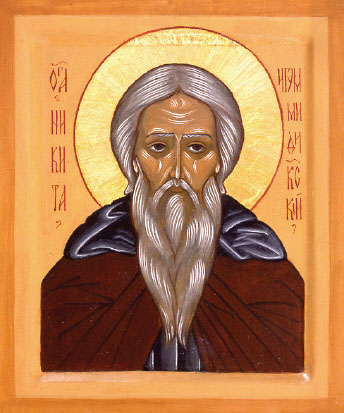
Nicetas of Chalcedon

Chalcedon was an episcopal see at an early date and several Christian martyrs are associated with Chalcedon:

- The virgin St. Euphemia and her companions in the early 4th century; the cathedral of Chalcedon was consecrated to her.
- St. Sabel the Persian and his companions.

It was the site of various ecclesiastical councils. The Fourth Ecumenical Council, known as 'the' Council of Chalcedon, was convened in 451 and defined the human and divine natures of Jesus, which provoked the schism with the churches composing Oriental Orthodoxy.

After the council, Chalcedon became a metropolitan see, but without suffragans. There is a list of its bishops in Le Quien, completed by Anthimus Alexoudes, revised for the early period by Pargoire. Among others are:

- St. Adrian, a martyr;
- St. John, Sts. Cosmas and Nicetas, during the Iconoclastic period;
- Maris, the Arian;
- Heraclianus, who wrote against the Manichaeans and the Monophysites;
- Leo, persecuted by Alexius I Comnenus.

=== Greek and Catholic successions ===
The Greek Orthodox Metropolitan of Chalcedon holds senior rank (currently third position) within the Greek Orthodox patriarchal synod of Constantinople. The incumbent is Metropolitan Athanasios Papas. The cathedral is that of St. Euphemia.

After the Great Schism, the Latin Church retained Chalcedon as a titular see with archiepiscopal rank, with known incumbents since 1356. Among the titular bishops named to this see were William Bishop (1623–1624) and Richard Smith (1624–1632), who were appointed vicars apostolic for the pastoral care of Catholics in England at a time when that country had no Catholic diocesan bishops. Such appointments ceased after the Second Vatican Council and the titular see has not been assigned since 1967.

Chalcedon has also been a titular archbishopric for two Eastern Catholic church dioceses:

- Syrian (Antiochian Rite, established in 1922; vacant since 1958)
- Armenian Catholic (Armenian Rite, established 1951, after two incumbents, suppressed in 1956)

== Notable people ==
- Euphemia (3rd century AD), Christian saint and martyr, patron saint of Chalcedon
- Boethus of Chalcedon (2nd century BC), Greek sculptor
- Herophilos (2nd century BC), Greek physician
- Phaleas of Chalcedon (4th century BC), Greek statesman
- Thrasymachus (5th century BC), Greek sophist
- Xenocrates (4th century BC), Greek philosopher

== See also ==
- List of ancient Greek cities
- List of traditional Greek place names
- Chalkidona, Greece
