= Hesychius I (bishop of Vienne) =

Bishop of Vienne, France

Saint Hesychius or Isicius (French: Isice or Hésychius; died c. 490) was a bishop of Vienne in the Dauphiné, France. He is venerated as a saint by the Catholic Church.

== Life ==
=== Origins ===
Hesychius or Isicius (occasionally also Isique or Ysile) is mentioned in the first extant list of the bishops of Vienne, the Catalogue of bishop Ado of Vienne (799-875)

He married Audentia, with whom he had two sons, Avitus, his successor in the episcopal seat of Vienne, and Apollinaris of Valence, who became bishop of Valence. He was apparently related to Sidonius Apollinaris, prefect of Rome and later bishop of Clermont.

According to the historian Bernard Bligny (1979), Hesychius belonged to "one of the principal Gallo-Roman families of 'Bourgogne', the Hesychii, a branch of the Syagrii", of whom several members were bishops of Vienne (three) and Grenoble (four).

=== Episcopacy ===
According to tradition, confirmed at least in part by the historian Ulysse Chevalier in his Notice chronologico-historique sur les archevêques de Vienne (1879), Hesychius was a senator before governing the diocese of Vienne. The Dictionnaire historique de la Suisse states that he was descended from a family of the senatorial nobility and was closely related to the Emperor Avitus.

In his Chronique (VI) Bishop Ado mentions Hesychius as the reigning bishop when Saint Severus of Vienne dedicated a church in Vienne at the time of the death of Saint Germanus of Auxerre. Lucas however maintains that whereas the dedication must have taken place in 448 and Severus' death in 450, Hesychius' episcopacy was later, probably between 475 and 490.

Hesychius seems to have died in about 490; his son Avitus succeeded him as bishop of Vienne.

== Cultus ==
Saint Hesychius occurs in the Martyrologium Hieronymianum under the date of 16 March. (The website Nominis.cef.fr gives for Saint Ysile the date of 15 March). He is also celebrated in the diocese of Grenoble-Vienne on 1 July, together with Saint Martin and all the bishop saints of Vienne.

== See also ==
- Hesychius II (bishop of Vienne)

== Sources ==
- Bligny, Bernard (1979). Histoire des diocèses de France:Grenoble (in French). Vol. 12. Paris: Éditions Beauchesne. p. 22.
- Charvet, Claude (1761). Histoire de la sainte église de Vienne (in French). Lyon: Chez C. Cizeron.
- Chevalier, Ulysse (1879). Notice chronologico-historique sur les archevêques de Vienne: d'après des documents paléographiques inédits (in French). Vienne: E.-J. Savigné.
- Duchesne, Louis (1894). Fastes épiscopaux de l'ancienne Gaule. Provinces du Sud-Est (tome premier) (in French). Paris: Thorin et fils.
- Lucas, Gérard (2018). "Adon de Vienne, Chronique, especially the 'Tableau récapitulatif de la liste des évêques de Vienne jusqu'à Avit'". Vienne dans les textes grecs et latins: Chroniques littéraires sur l'histoire de la cité, des Allobroges à la fin du Ve siècle de notre ère (in French). MOM Éditions. pp. 247–270. ISBN 9782356681850.
