= Boethus of Chalcedon =

Greek sculptor

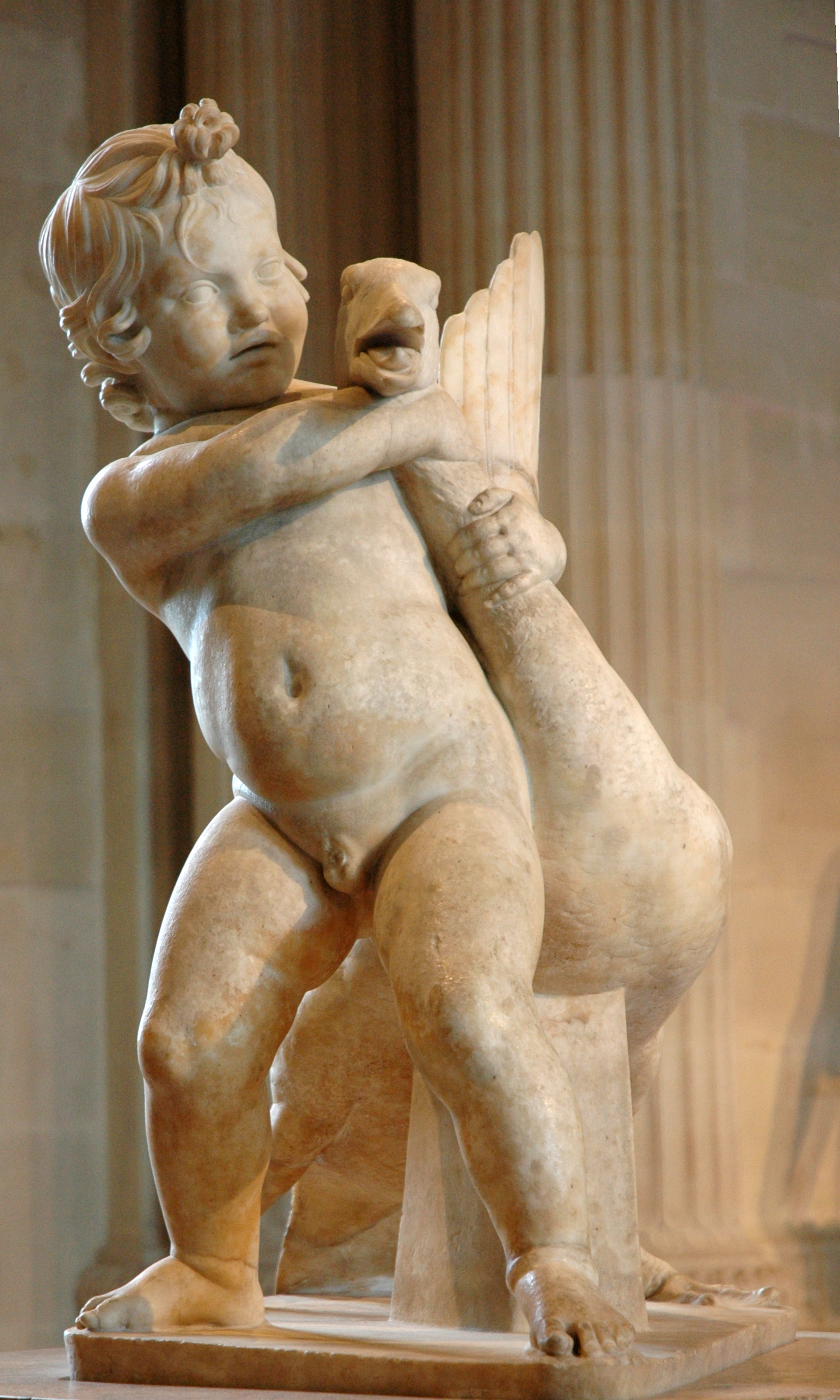
Roman copy of Boethus' sculpture of a boy playing with a goose.

Boëthus (Greek: Βόηθος) was a Greek sculptor of the Hellenistic age. His life dates cannot be accurately fixed, but he probably flourished in the 2nd century BCE. One source gives his birthplace as Chalcedon.

He was noted for his representations of children, especially for a group representing a boy struggling with a goose, of which several copies survive in museums. Other works represent a girl playing with dice, and a boy extracting a thorn. According to Pliny, he also worked with silver. Because Boethus was a common name in ancient Greece, specific details of his life are difficult to ascertain.
