= Desideratus of Verdun =

French Catholic bishop and saint

Desideratus or Desiderius of Verdun (French: Désiré de Verdun, also Didier; c. 480 – 8 May 554) was Bishop of Verdun in France from 529 to 554. He is venerated as a Catholic saint, with his feast day on 23 August.

== Life ==
Desideratus was a member of the aristocratic Gallo-Roman family of Syagrii, the son of Gundobaud of Burgundy, and the father of Saint Syagrius of Autun. The name of Desideratus' wife is unknown; she is said to have been "a noble woman from Toulouse," possibly a daughter of Vandal King Gesalec. According to some sources they had four children: Gondoald, Count of Meaux, Syagrius, Bishop of Autun, Didier, Duke of Toulouse, and Salvius, Bishop of Albi.

Gregory of Tours relates that the Merovingian King, Theuderic I, "had done much harm to Desideratus," and had him tortured, removed from office, and forced to flee. This malice was caused by the denouncement of Desideratus by Sirivald. When Desideratus returned, he found that the people had been impoverished. Desideratus solicited a loan from Theuderic's son and successor Theudebert I, promising repayment when business had been restored. Theudebert loaned Desideratus seven thousand gold pieces. When Desideratus went to repay the money, Theudebert refused saying "It is enough for me that, when you asked that I should make a loan, those who were poor and in dire distress were returned to prosperity."

== Death ==
After the death of Desideratus, his son Syagrius wanted revenge for the harm done by the ill word of Sirivald. Syagrius organized an expedition in 554 to assassinate Sirivald. They reached Sirivald's villa in Fleury-sur-Ouche near Dijon. They killed the first person to exit the villa and left. They had killed a dependent of Sirivald. After realizing their mistake, they returned and murdered Sirivald.
