= Saint Sigrada =

Franco-Burgundian countess

Widow
- Born: Kingdom of Burgundy
- Died: c. 679 AD; Soissons, Neustria
- Venerated in: Eastern Orthodox Church; Roman Catholic Church
- Canonized: Pre-Congregation
- Feast: August 8 (Roman Catholicism, Eastern Orthodoxy); August 4 (France)

Sigrada of Alsace (French: Sigrade d'Alsace; died c. 679 AD) was a Franco-Burgundian countess and mother of Ss. Warin, and Leodegar, and grandmother of St. Leudwinus.

== Life ==
Hagiographies tend not to mention where she was born, but given that she is popularly known as Sigrada of Alsace, she was probably Alsatian. She was from the Syagrii family of Gallo-Roman Patricians. Her brother was Bishop Dido (also called Desiderius) of Poitiers. She married Count Bodilon of Poitiers and gave birth to Warin and Leodegar in Autun, Saône-et-Loire, Burgundy. Through Warin, who inherited the County of Poitiers, she became the ancestor of the Franco-Lombard dynasty of the Widonids (also called the Lambertiners).

She sent Warin to be educated at the court of Chlothar II, while she arranged for Leodegar to be educated under her brother Dido's tutelage. Leodegar quickly rose to prominence as an archdeacon and priest-monk responsible for a major Benedictine reform. He caught the attention of the nobility and became embroiled in the complex politics of Merovingian partition. His political stances were used as a pretext by his rival Ebroin to begin persecuting him and his family, including Sigrada. She was shut up in the monastery of Notre-Dame de Soissons by Ebroin. She had all her property taken away and received a letter describing all the tortures her sons were subjected to. She died shortly after both her sons were martyred.
