= Abbey of Saint-Jean-le-Grand =

Former abbey in Autun, Saône-et-Loire, France

Coordinates: 46°57′31″N 4°18′01″E

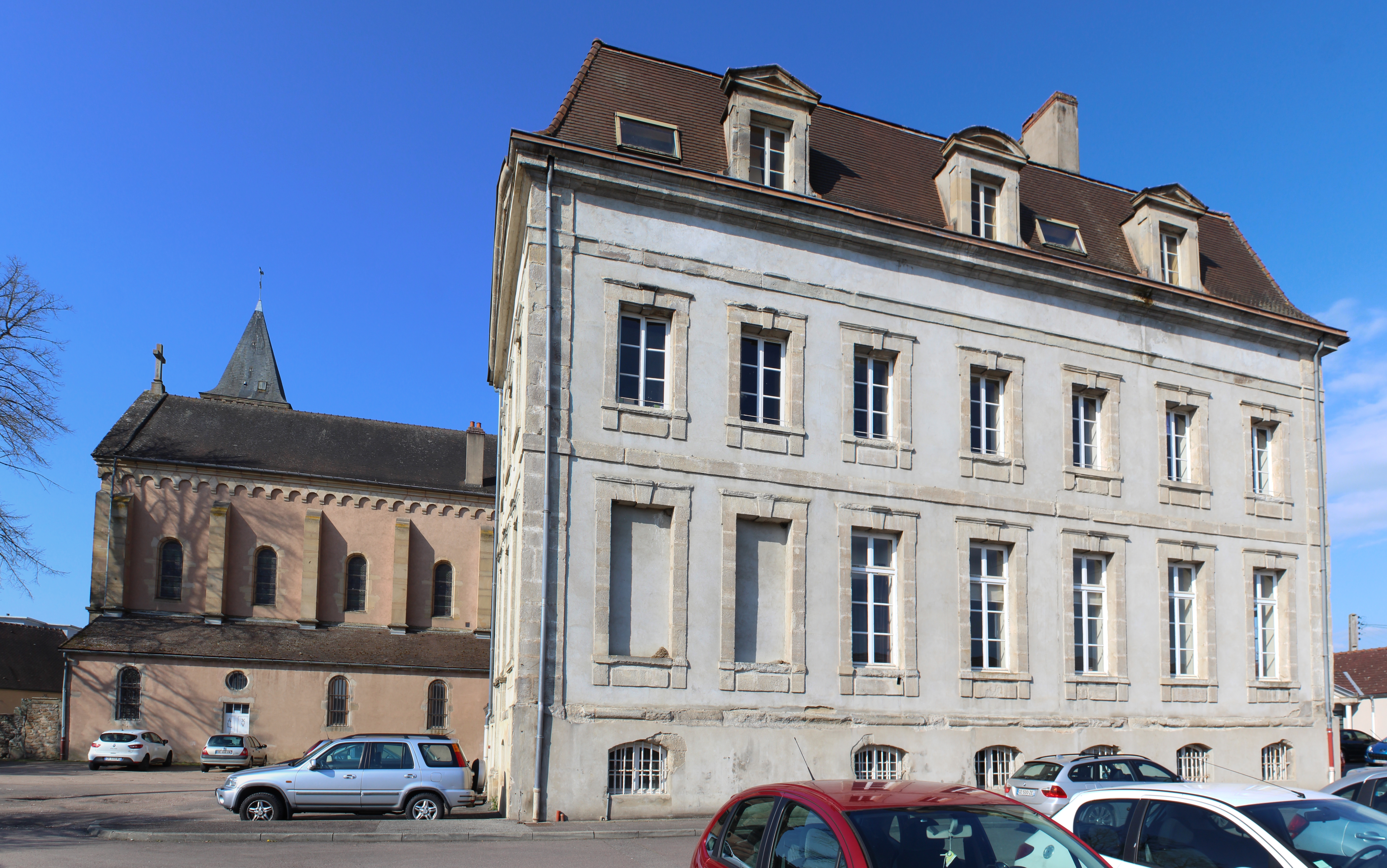
Abbey of Saint-Jean-le-Grand, Autun

The Abbey of Saint-Jean-le-Grand (French: Abbaye Saint-Jean-le-Grand d'Autun) is a former Benedictine nunnery, in Autun, Saône-et-Loire, France, possibly founded by Queen Brunhilda and Bishop Syagrius of Autun. According to Gregory of Tours, it already existed in 589.

This monastery was plundered and destroyed by the Saracens in 732, and again in 765 by Waiofar, Duke of Aquitaine. Charlemagne had it rebuilt and gave it the name of St. John.

It was suppressed during the French Revolution.

The abbey church was demolished; a parish church was built on the same site in the 1850s. Most of the conventual buildings were also demolished. The few that survive are from no earlier than the late 17th century and early 18th centuries.
