= Didier-Léon Marchand =

French priest (1925–2022)

- Bishop of Valence
- Church: Catholic Church
- Diocese: Diocese of Valence
- In office: 8 September 1978 – 11 December 2001
- Predecessor: Jean de Cambourg
- Successor: Jean-Christophe Lagleize

Orders
- Ordination: 19 May 1951
- Consecration: 5 November 1978 by Gabriel Matagrin

Personal details
- Born: 1 November 1925 La Chapelle-de-Surieu, Isère, France
- Died: 16 January 2022 (aged 96) Valence, Auvergne-Rhône-Alpes, France

Didier-Léon Marchard (1 November 1925 – 16 February 2022) was a French Roman Catholic bishop.

Marchard was born in France and was ordained to the priesthood in 1951. He served as bishop of the Roman Catholic Diocese of Valence, France from 1978 until his retirement in 2001. Marchand died on 16 February 2022, at the age of 96.
