= Valence Cathedral =

Cathedral in Drôme, France

Coordinates: 44°55′54″N 4°53′22″E

Valence Cathedral Cathédrale Saint-Apollinaire de Valence
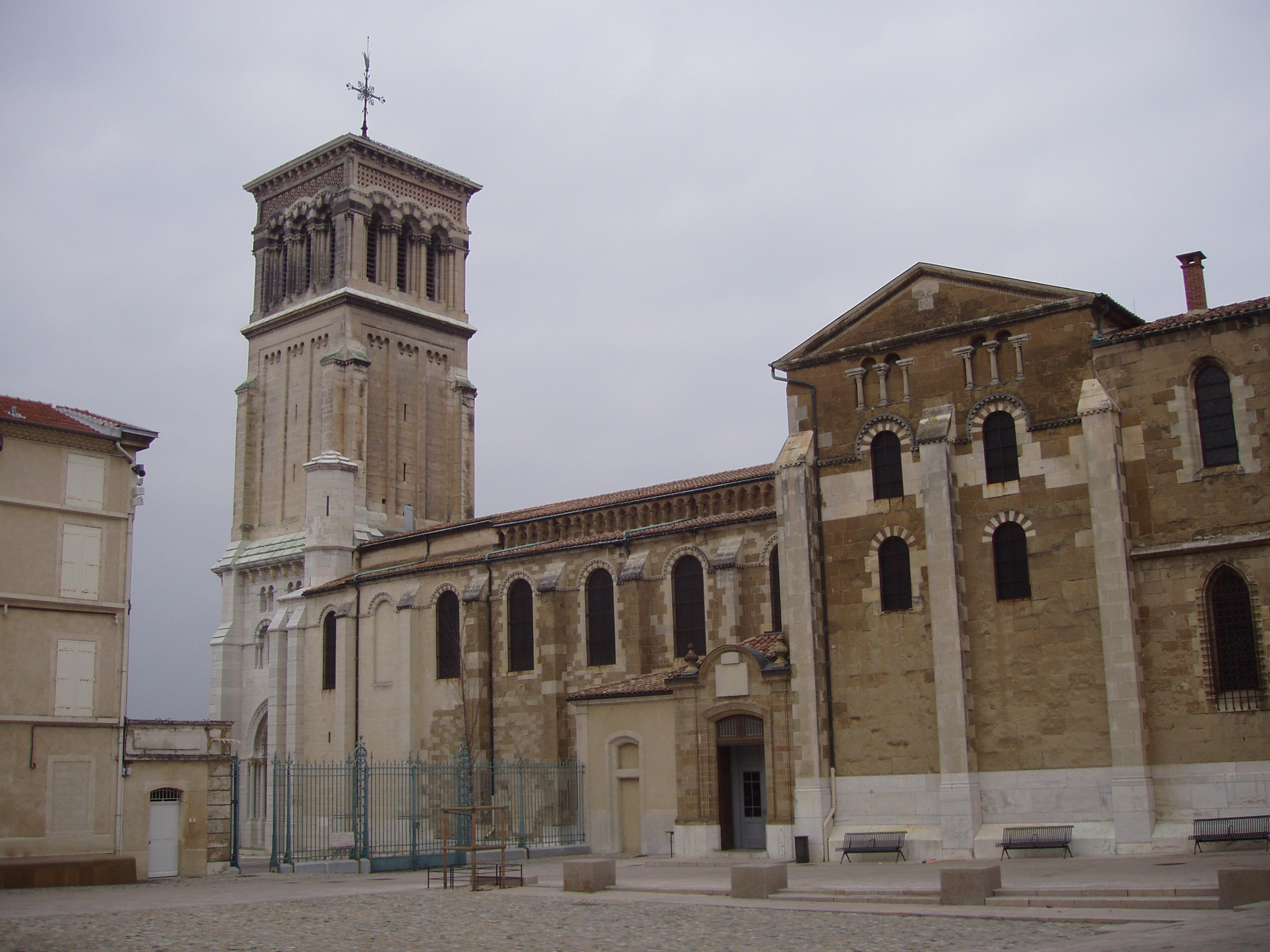
- Valence Cathedral, view from Place des Ormeaux

Religion
- Affiliation: Catholic Church
- Province: Bishop of Valence
- Region: Auvergne-Rhône-Alpes
- Rite: Catholic
- Ecclesiastical or organizational status: Minor basilica
- Status: Active

Location
- Location: Valence
- State: France
- Interactive map of Valence Cathedral; Cathédrale Saint-Apollinaire de Valence

Architecture
- Type: Church
- Style: Romanesque
- Groundbreaking: 11th century
- Completed: 19th century

Valence Cathedral (French: Cathédrale Saint-Apollinaire de Valence) is a Catholic church, dedicated to Saint Apollinaris of Valence, in Valence, France. It is the seat of the Bishop of Valence. It was elevated to the status of a minor basilica in 1847. The cathedral is in the Romanesque architectural tradition. It has been classified as a historical monument since 1862.

== History ==
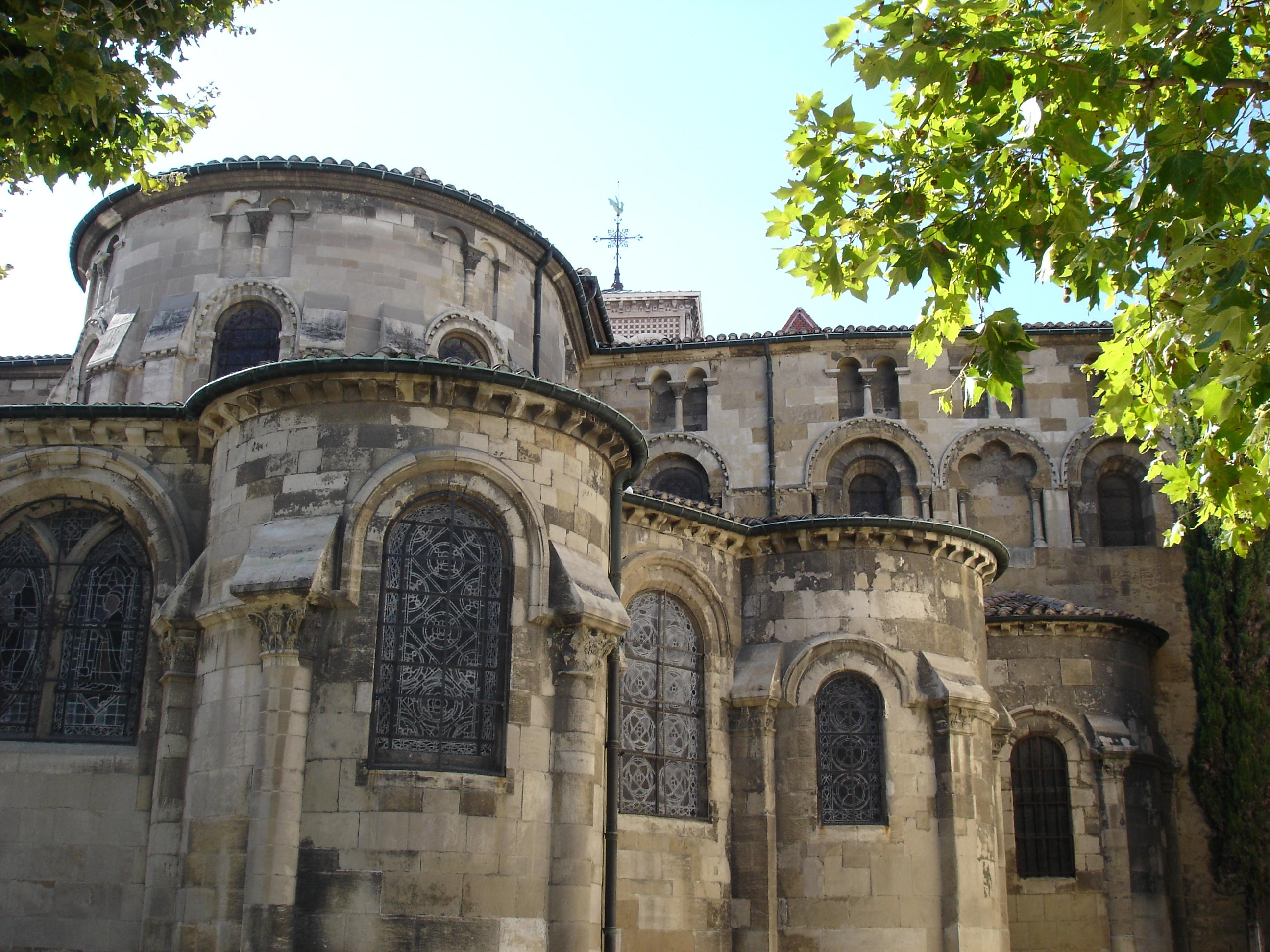
Valence Cathedral, apse

Valence Cathedral was originally dedicated to Saints Pope Cornelius and Cyprian (third-century martyrs, respectively Bishops of Rome and of Carthage).

It was a stopover church on the road to Santiago de Compostela. In 1095 during a visit to France, Pope Urban II rededicated the cathedral to Saint Apollinaris, one of Valence's sixth-century bishops.

The architecture of this cathedral is similar to other monuments in Auvergne and Velay, in particular the polychrome stone decorations. The apse is surrounded by four semi-circular chapels.

It suffered extensive damage in the French Wars of Religion, but it was restored in the first decade of the 17th century.

Pope Pius VI, who had been taken prisoner and deported from Italy by troops of the French Directory, was imprisoned in the fortress of Valence. After six weeks he died there, on 29 August 1799. The church contains his monument.

The cathedral was granted the status of minor basilica on 4 May 1847. The porch and the stone tower above it were rebuilt in 1861.

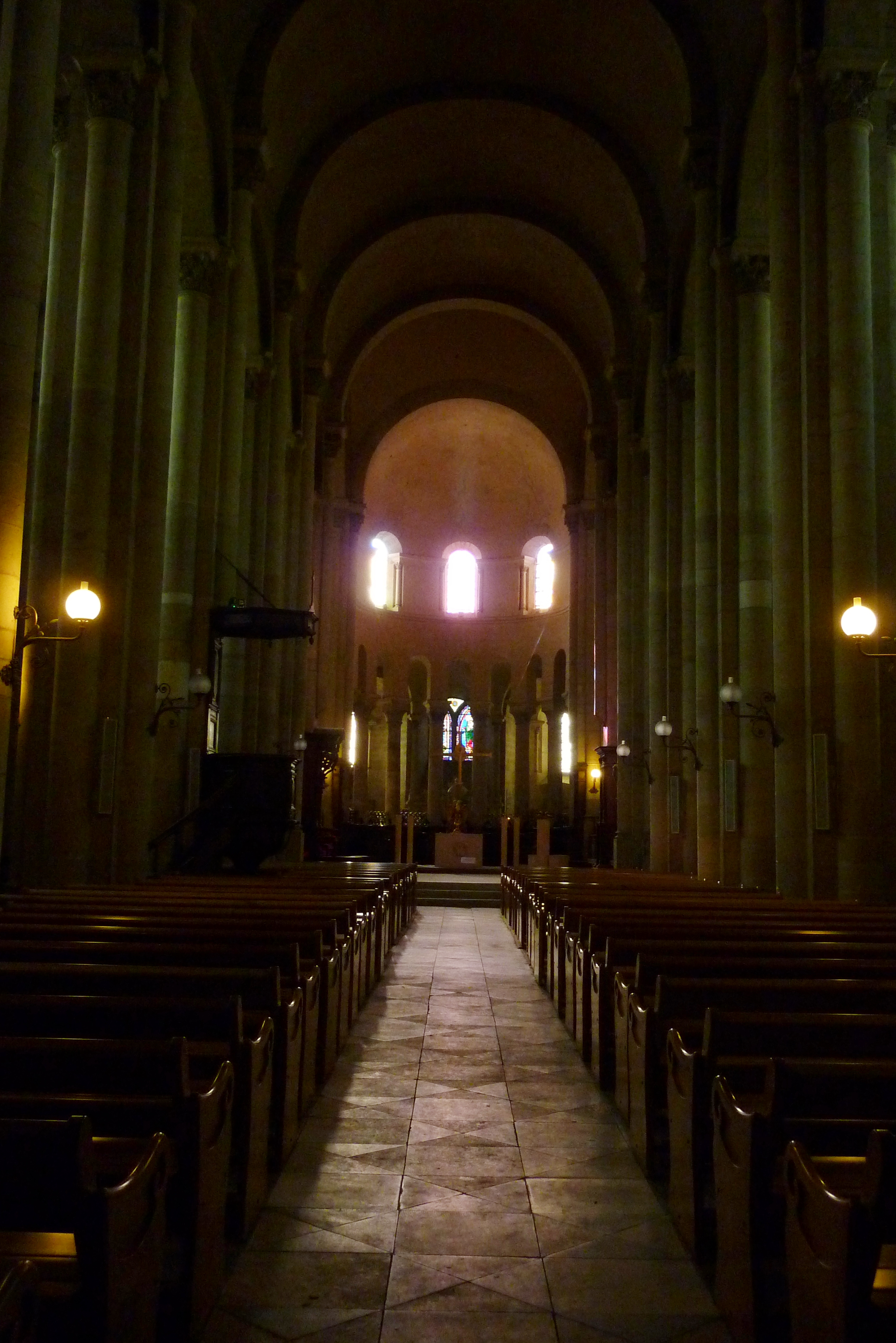
View down the nave looking east

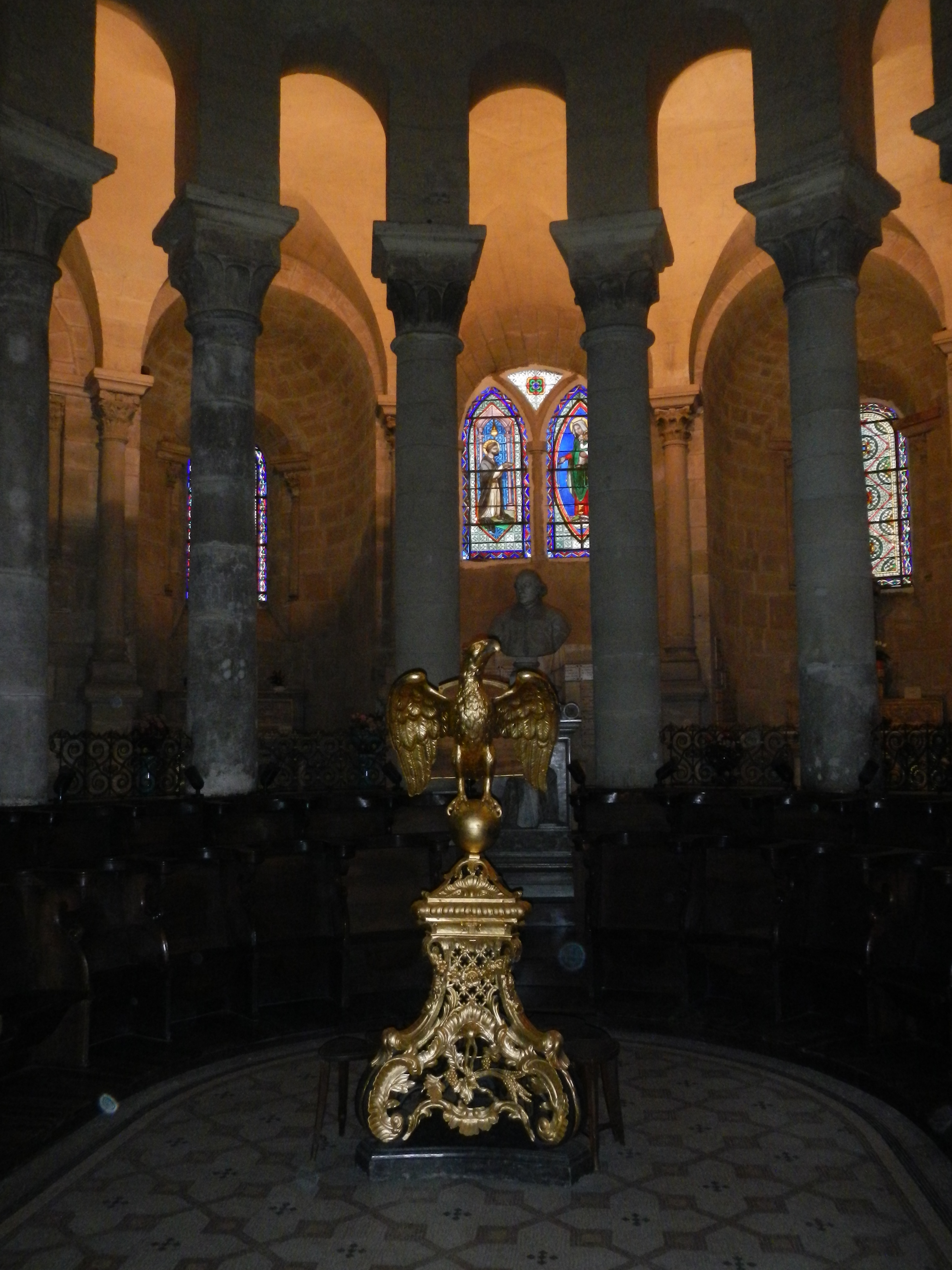
Apse

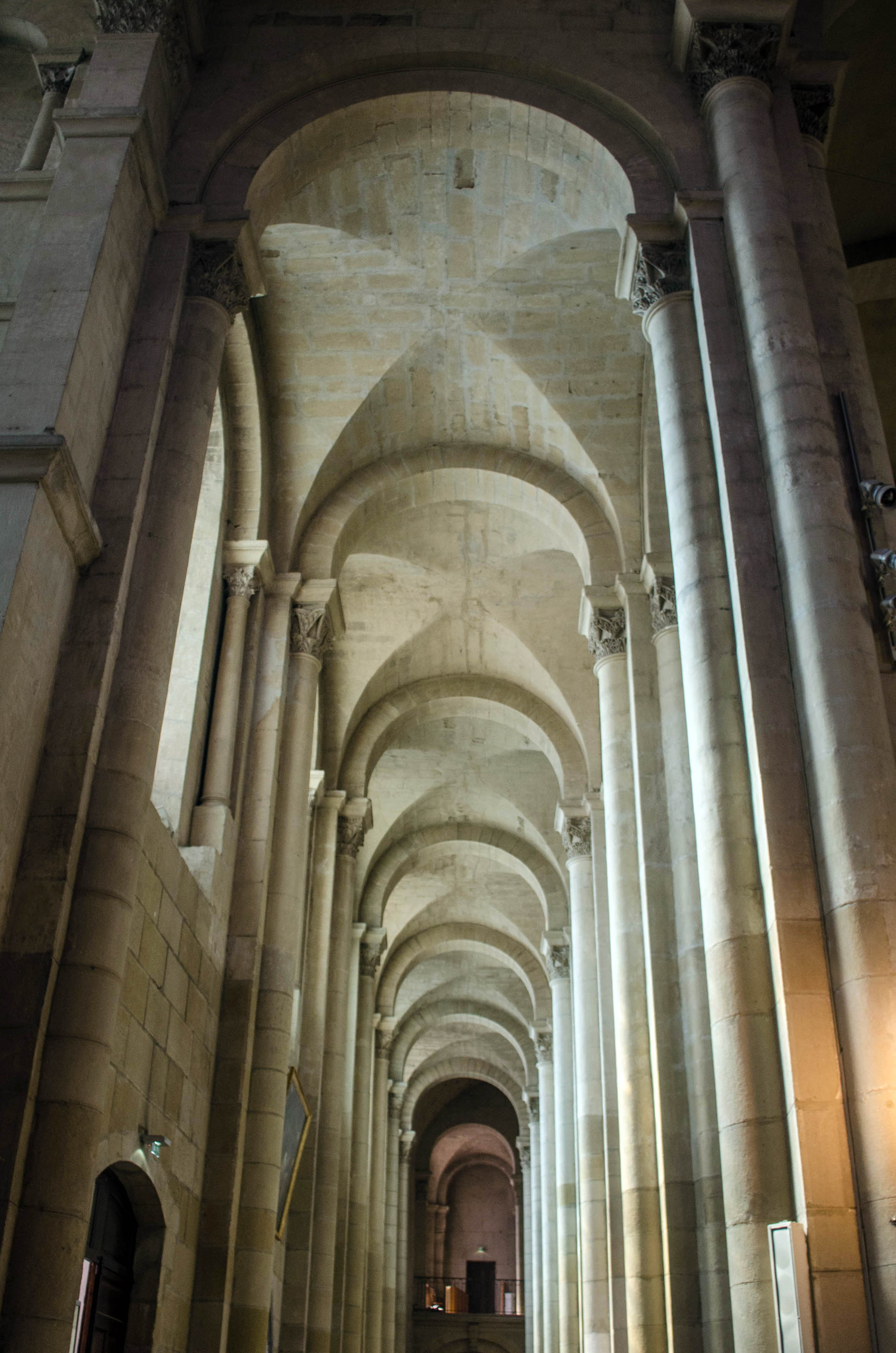
Vaulted roof of the nave
