= Saint Warinus =

Franco-Burgundian Count of Poitiers and Count of Paris

Martyr of the Franks
- Born: Autun, kingdom of Burgundy
- Died: 677 AD; Arras, Neustria
- Venerated in: Eastern Orthodox Church; Roman Catholic Church
- Canonized: Pre-Congregation
- Feast: August 25

Warinus of Poitiers (also Warin, Guerin, Gerinus, Varinus; died 677 AD) was the Franco-Burgundian Count of Poitiers and later Count of Paris. He was from a noble family. He was martyred at Arras in 677.

== Life ==
Warinus was born in Autun, Saône-et-Loire, Burgundy, the son of Bodilon, Count of Poitiers and his wife Sigrada of Alsace. He was from the Syagrii family of Gallo-Roman Patricians. His maternal uncle was Dido (Desiderius), Bishop of Poitiers; his brother Leodegar became Bishop of Autun.

Warinus spent his childhood at the court of Chlothar II.

Like his brother, Warinus was an opponent of the Neustrian Mayor of the Palace, Ebroin, who sought to impose Neustrian authority over Burgundy and Austrasia. After Ebroin's victory, Warinus was stoned to death near Arras in 677 AD.

== Family ==
He married Gunza von Treves, a noblewoman from an influential Frankish family, and the sister of Saint Basinus of Treves. Their children were:

- Leudwinus (born 660 AD - died 722 AD), Archbishop of Treves and Laon
- Grimgert, Count of Paris (born c. 667 AD)
