= Syagrius of Autun =

French bishop and saint

Saint Syagrius (French: Saint-Siacre; died 600 AD) was a bishop of Autun and previously count of Albi and judge in Marseille. His feast day is August 27 (September 2 in some martyrologies), brother of Didier Salvi, bishop of Vienne.

He was bishop of Autun from around 560 until his death and travelled to Nanterre with Guntram for the baptism of Chlothar II. He provided hospitality to Saint Augustine of Canterbury on the latter's way to England. Pope Gregory I granted Syagrius the pallium and decreed that the bishops of Autun have precedence in France after the archbishop of Lyon.

== Biography ==
Syagrius was son of Bishop (later Saint) Desideratus of Verdun, who was denounced by Sirivald. For reasons of rivalry and revenge; Syagrius organized a punitive expedition in 554, to assassinate Sirivald. After murdering a first person by mistake, they returned to fulfil its mission.

In 567, he participated in the Second Synod of Lyon, and 573 in the Third Synod of Paris convened by Guntram, and the Second Council of Mâcon in 581, and 583 in the Third Council of Lyons. He received 596 monks sent by Pope Gregory the Great on a mission to convert England, led by the monk Augustine of Canterbury.

Bishop Syagrius convinced Queen Brunhild to build in Autun three institutions that would play a big role in the history of the city: the Abbey of St Andoche, a hospice and Benedictine nunnery; the Abbey of St. John the Great, also a Benedictine nunnery; and the Abbey of St Martin, a Benedictine monastery.

Venantius Fortunatus who was a brilliant composer of complicated poetry sent many acrostics to Syagrius.

== Veneration ==
His relics can be seen at Val-de-Grâce in Paris.
