= Leodegar =

Bishop of Autun (c.615–679 AD)

Saint Leodegar (or Leger) Bishop of Autun
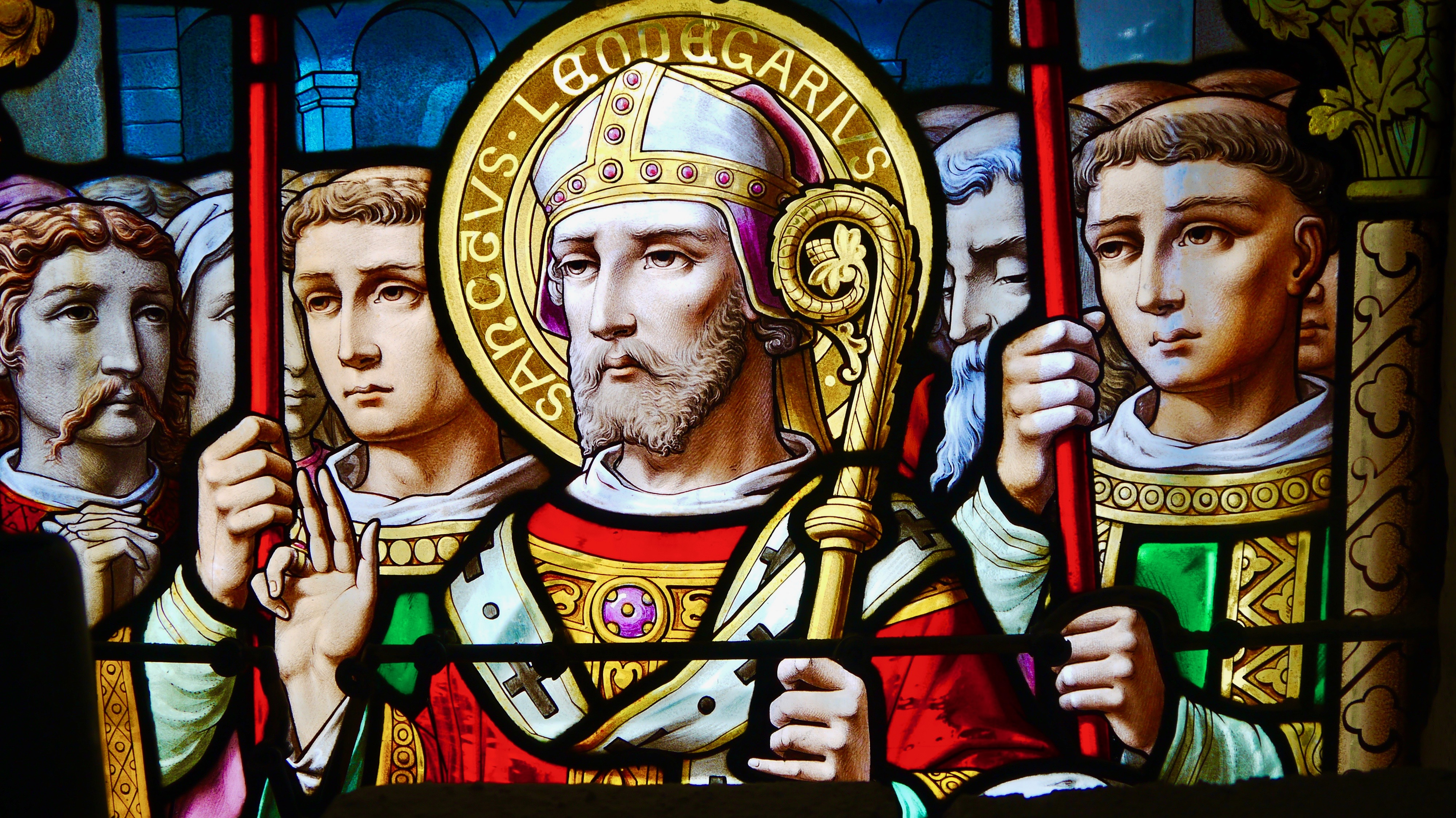
- Born: c. 615; Autun, Saône-et-Loire, Burgundy, Kingdom of the Franks (now France)
- Died: October 2, 679; Sarcing, Somme, Picardy, Kingdom of the Franks (now France)
- Venerated in: Catholic Church; Eastern Orthodox Church
- Canonized: Pre-Congregation
- Major shrine: Cathedral of Autun and the Grand Séminaire of Soissons
- Feast: October 2
- Attributes: Man having his eyes bored out with a gimlet Bishop holding a gimlet Bishop holding a hook with two prongs
- Patronage: Millers; Invoked against blindness Eye disease Eye problems Sore eyes

Leodegar of Poitiers (Latin: Leodegarius; French: Léger; c. 615 – October 2, 679 AD) was a martyred Burgundian Bishop of Autun. He was the son of Saint Sigrada and the brother of Saint Warinus.

Leodegar was an opponent of Ebroin, the Frankish Mayor of the Palace of Neustria, and the leader of the faction of Burgundian nobles. His torture and death made him a martyr and saint.

== Early life ==
Leodegar was the son of a high-ranking Burgundian nobleman, Bodilon, Count of Poitiers and Paris and St. Sigrada of Alsace, who later became a nun in the convent of Sainte-Marie at Soissons. His brother was Warinus.

He spent his childhood in Paris at the court of Clotaire II, King of the Franks and was educated at the palace school. When he was older he was sent to Poitiers, where there was a long-established cathedral school, to study under his maternal uncle, Desiderius (Dido), Bishop of Poitiers. When he was twenty, his uncle made him an archdeacon.

Shortly afterwards Leodegar became a priest, and in 650, with the bishop's permission, became a monk at the monastery of St Maxentius in Poitou. He was soon elected abbot, and initiated reforms including the introduction of the Benedictine rule.

== Career ==
Around 656, Leodegar was called to the Neustrian court by the widowed Queen Bathilde to assist in the government of the united kingdoms and in the education of her children. Then in 659, he was installed at the see of Autun, in Burgundy; he again undertook the work of reform and held a council at Autun in 661. The council denounced Manichaeism. He made reforms among the secular clergy and in the religious communities, and had three baptisteries erected in the city. The church of Saint-Nazaire was enlarged and embellished, and a refuge established for the indigent. Leodegar also caused the public buildings to be repaired and the old Roman walls of Autun to be restored. His authority at Autun placed him as a leader among the Franco-Burgundian nobles.

Leodegar became one of the leaders of the opposition against Ebroin, mayor of the palace in Neustria. Ebroin accused Leodegar before King Clothar III, but the king then died in 673, while the trial was still going on. Ebroin now installed Clothar's youngest brother, Theoderic III, as king. As the mayor denied the nobles of Neustria and Burgundy access to the king, they called in the middle brother, Childeric II, who had been king of Austrasia since 662 and now assumed rule over Neustria and Burgundy as well. Ebroin was interned at Luxeuil and Theoderic sent to St. Denis.

Leodegar, who had supported this change, soon ran into conflict with the new king as the latter surrounded himself with advisors from Austrasia. The bishop also criticized the king for his uncanonical marriage to his first cousin Bilichild. After finding himself on the losing side in a hereditary dispute, the king banished Leodegar to Luxeuil as well.

When Childeric II was murdered at Bondi in 675, by a disaffected Frank, Theoderic III was installed as king in Neustria, making Leudesius his mayor. Ebroin took advantage of the chaos to make his escape from Luxeuil and hasten to the court. In a short time Ebroin had Leudesius murdered and became mayor once again, still Leodegar's implacable enemy.

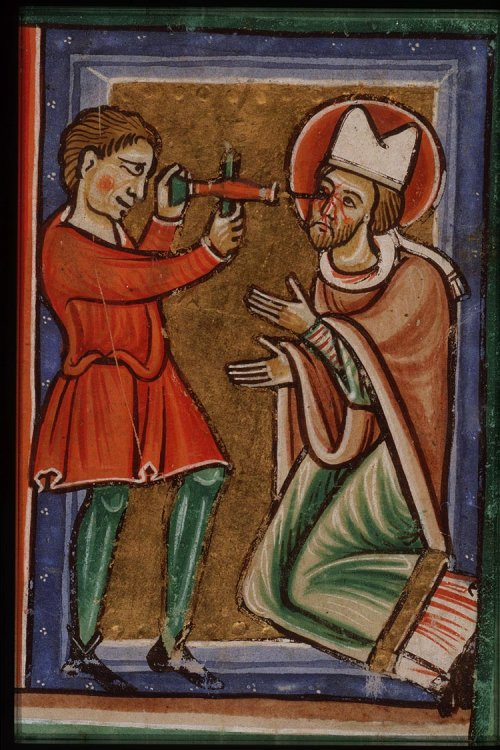
The martyrdom of St. Leger

About 675 the Duke of Champagne, the Bishop of Châlons-sur-Marne and the Bishop of Valence, stirred up by Ebroin, attacked Autun, and Leodegar fell into their hands. At Ebroin's instigation, Leodegar's eyes were gouged out and the sockets cauterized, and his tongue was cut out. Some years later Ebroin persuaded the king that Childeric had been assassinated at the instigation of Leodegar. The bishop was seized again, and, after a mock trial, was degraded and condemned to further exile, at Fécamp, in Normandy. Near Sarcing he was led out into a forest on Ebroin's order and beheaded.

A dubious testament drawn up at the time of the council of Autun has been preserved as well as the Acts of the council. A letter which he caused to be sent to his mother after his mutilation is likewise extant.

In 782, his relics were translated from the site of his death, Sarcing in Artois, to the site of his earliest hagiography – the Abbey of St Maxentius (Saint-Maixent) near Poitiers. Later they were removed to Rennes and thence to Ebreuil, which place took the name of Saint-Léger in his honour. Some relics are still kept in the cathedral of Autun and the Grand Séminaire of Soissons. In 1458 Jehan Cardinal Rolin, Bishop of Autun, caused his feast day to be observed as a holy day of obligation.

For sources to his biography, there are two early Lives, drawn from the same lost source (Krusch 1891), and also two later ones (one of them in verse).

== Cultural significance ==
Historically there was a custom among wealthy British merchants to sell in May, spend the summer outside of London, then to return on St Leger's Day. This gave rise to the saying used in regards to financial trading markets, "Sell in May and go away, and come on back on St. Leger's Day".

== In numismatics ==
There are few types of thalers, ducats, and guldens were minted in the XV-XVI centuries in the Canton of Lucerne, Switzerland. Obverse has the image of Saint Leodegar facing left, sitting on a gothic throne, nimbate, wearing mitre and episcopal regalia, and a soldier to the left, wearing military attire and sword, gouging the right eye of the saint with a hand drill.

== See also ==
- Liber Historiae Francorum
- List of Catholic saints
- Saint Leodegar, patron saint archive
- Saint-Léger de Cheylade Church

== Sources ==
=== Primary sources ===
- Liber Historiae Francorum, edited by B. Krusch, in MGH SS rer. Merov. vol. ii.
- Passio Leudegarii I & II, edited by B. Krusch and W. Levison, in MGH SS rer. Merov. vol v.
- Vita sancti Leodegarii, by Ursinus, then a monk of St Maixent (Migne, Patrilogia Latina, vol. xcvi.)
- Vita metrica in Poetae Latini aevi Carolini, vol. iii. (Mod. Germ. Hist.)
- Epistolae aevi Merovingici collectae 17, edited by W. Gundlach, in MGH EE vol iii.

=== Secondary sources ===
- Adriaan Breukelaar (1992). "Leodegar". In Bautz, Traugott (ed.). Biographisch-Bibliographisches Kirchenlexikon (BBKL) (in German). Vol. 4. Herzberg: Bautz. cols. 1466–1468. ISBN 3-88309-038-7.
- J. Friedrich, Zur Geschichte des Hausmeiers Ebroin, in the Proceedings of the Academy of Munich (1887, pp. 42–61)
- J. B. Pitra, Histoire de Saint Léger (Paris, 1846)
