= Apollinaris of Valence =

Saint Apollinaris (of Valence)
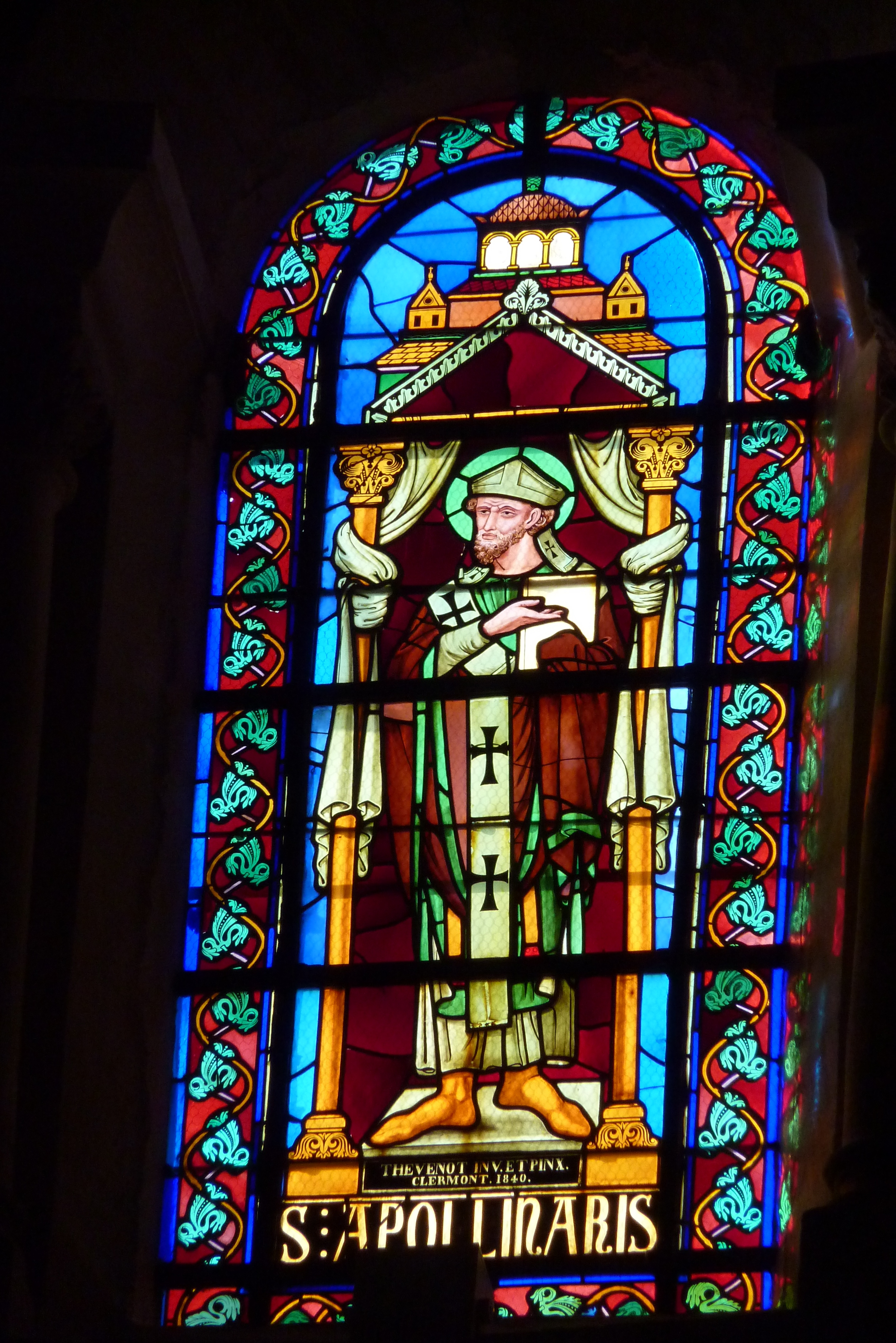
- Stained glass depiction of Apollinaris in the Valence Cathedral
- Born: c. 453; Vienne
- Died: c. 520; Valence
- Venerated in: Catholicism; Eastern Orthodoxy
- Canonized: Pre-congregation
- Major shrine: Valence Cathedral, Valence, Drôme, France

Saint Apollinaris of Valence (also known as Aplonay) (453–520), born in Vienne, France, was bishop of Valence, France, at the time of the irruption of the barbarians. Valence, which was the central see of the recently founded Kingdom of the Burgundians, had been scandalized by the dissolute Bishop Maximus, and the see in consequence had been vacant for fifty years.

== Life ==
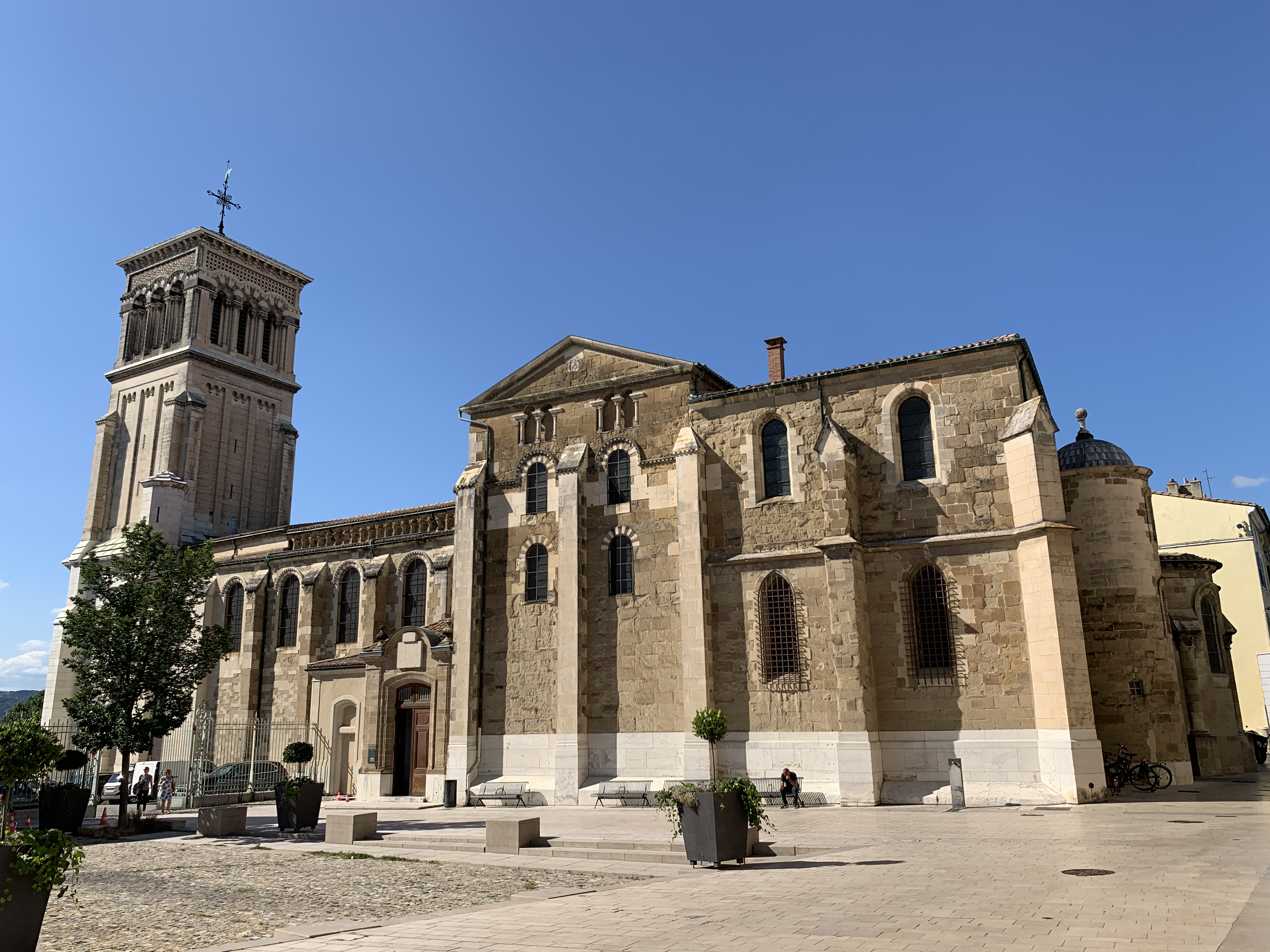
Saint Apollinaris Cathedral in Valencia

Apollinaris was of a family of nobles and saints; his father was Hesychius, bishop of Vienne, where episcopal honors were informally hereditary, and where his brother Avitus would also serve as bishop. His paternal grandfather was an unknown western emperor of Rome. He was a cousin of Tonantius Ferreolus, whom he visited in 517.

Apollinaris was little over twenty when he was ordained a priest. In 486, when he was thirty-three years old, he was made bishop of the long-vacant See of Valence, and under his care abuses were corrected and morals reformed, restoring its previous stature. Bishop Apollinaris was so beloved that the news of his first illness filled the city with consternation. He attended a conference at Lyon, between the Arians and Catholics, held in presence of King Gundobad, where he distinguished himself by his eloquence and learning.

A contestation in defence of marriage brought Apollinaris again into prominence. Stephen, the treasurer of the kingdom, was living in incest. The four bishops of the province commanded him to separate from his companion, but he appealed to King Sigismund, who sustained his official and exiled the four bishops to Sardinia. As they refused to yield, the King relented, and after some time permitted them to return to their Sees, with the exception of Apollinaris, whose defiance had made him particularly obnoxious to the King, and was kept a close prisoner for a year. At last the King, stricken with a severe illness, repented, and the Queen in person came to beg Apollinaris to go to the court to restore the monarch to health. On his refusal, the Queen asked for his cloak to place on the sufferer. The request was granted, and the King recovered. Apollinaris was sixty-four years old when he returned from Sardinia to Valence, and his people received him with joy. He died after an episcopate of thirty-four years, at the age of sixty-seven. (In due course, King Sigismund also achieved sainthood.) His relics were cast into the Rhone by the Huguenots in the sixteenth century. Valence Cathedral is dedicated to him.
