= Avitus of Vienne =

Late antique bishop and poet

Saint Alcimus Ecdicius Avitus of Vienne
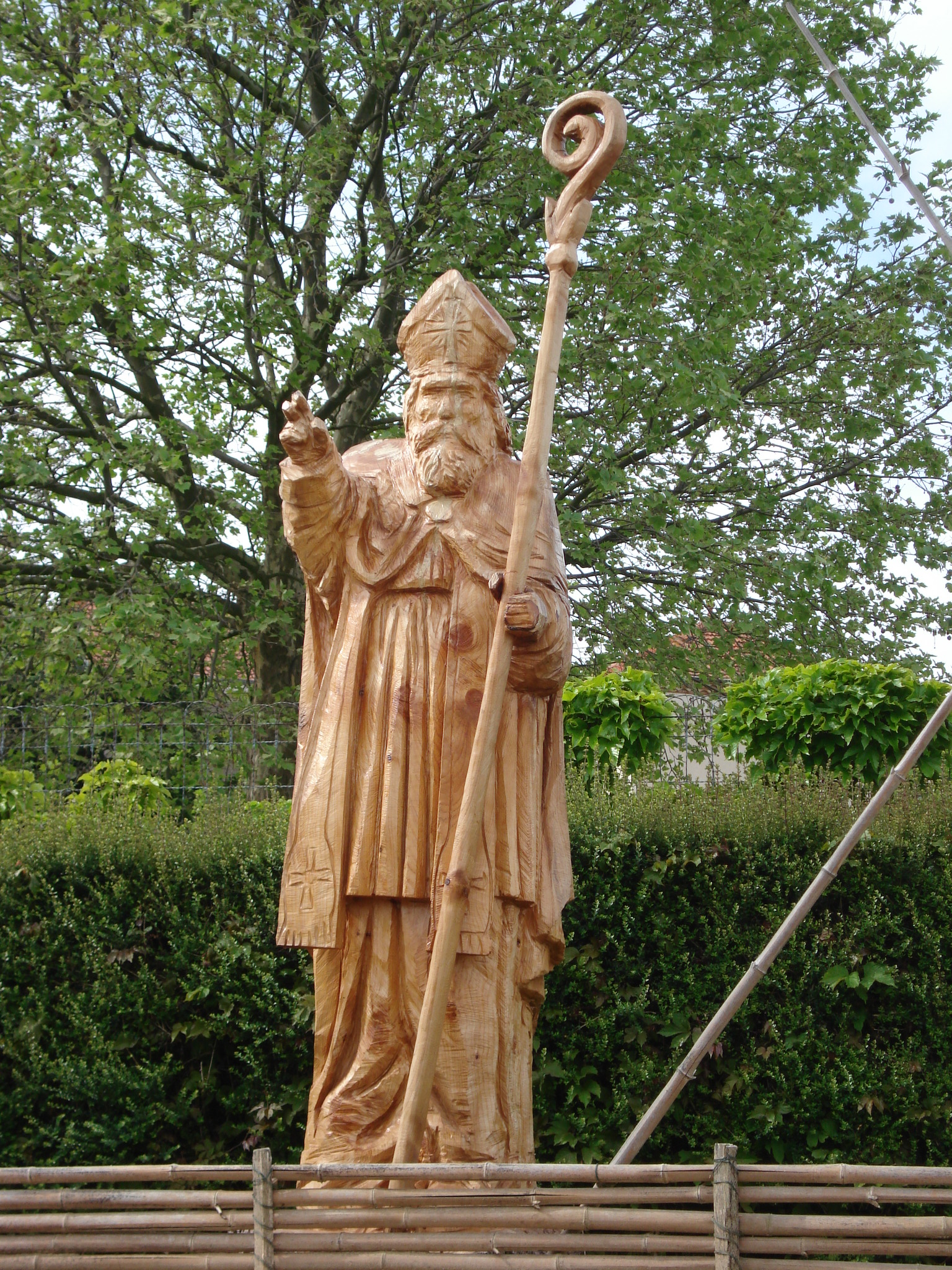
- Statue in Saint-Avit dans la Drôme, in France
- Born: c. 450
- Died: After 517 and before 519
- Venerated in: Catholic Church; Eastern Orthodox Church
- Feast: February 5

Alcimus Ecdicius Avitus (c. 450 – February 5, 517/518 or 519) was a Latin poet and bishop of Vienne in Gaul. His fame rests in part on his poetry, but also on the role he played as secretary for the Burgundian kings.

Avitus was born of a prominent Gallo-Roman senatorial family related to Emperor Avitus.

== Life ==
His father was Hesychius, bishop of Vienne, where episcopal honors were informally hereditary. His paternal grandfather was a western Roman emperor whose precise identity is not known. Apollinaris of Valence was his younger brother; their sister Fuscina became a nun.

Avitus was probably born at Vienne, for he was baptized by bishop Mamertus. About 490 he was ordained bishop of Vienne. In 499 Vienne was captured by Gundobad, king of the Burgundians, who was at war with Clovis, king of the Franks, where he came to the attention of that king. Avitus, as metropolitan of southern and eastern Gaul, took the lead in a conference between the Catholic and Arian bishops held in presence of Gundobad at Sardiniacum near Lyon. He won the confidence of King Gundobad, and converted his son, King Sigismund to Catholicism.

A letter of Pope Hormisdas to Avitus records that he was made vicar apostolic in Gaul by that pontiff; and in 517 he presided in this capacity at the Council of Epaon for restoring ecclesiastical discipline in Gallia Narbonensis. Avitus appears also to have exerted himself to terminate the dispute between the churches of Rome and Constantinople which arose out of the excommunication of Acacius; his later letters suggest that this was accomplished before his death.

Upon his death, Avitus was buried in the monastery of St. Peter and St. Paul at Vienne.

== Writings ==
The literary fame of Avitus rests on his many surviving letters (his recent editors make them ninety-six in all) and on a long poem, Poematum de Mosaicae historiae gestis (also known as De spiritualis historiae gestis), in classical hexameters, in five books, dealing with the Biblical themes of original sin, expulsion from Paradise, the Deluge, and the Crossing of the Red Sea. The first three books offer a certain dramatic unity; in them are told the preliminaries of the great disaster, the catastrophe itself, and the consequences. The fourth and fifth books deal with the Deluge and the Crossing of the Red Sea as symbols of baptism. Avitus deals freely and familiarly with the Scriptural events, and exhibits well their beauty, sequence, and significance. He is one of the last masters of the art of rhetoric as taught in the schools of Gaul in the 4th and 5th centuries. His poetic diction, though abounding in archaisms and rhythmic redundancy, is pure and select, and the laws of metre are well observed. Writing in the Catholic Encyclopedia, Thomas Joseph Shahan says "that Milton made use of his paraphrase of Scripture in writing Paradise Lost." Avitus also wrote a poem for his sister Fuscina, a nun, "De consolatoriâ castitatis laude".

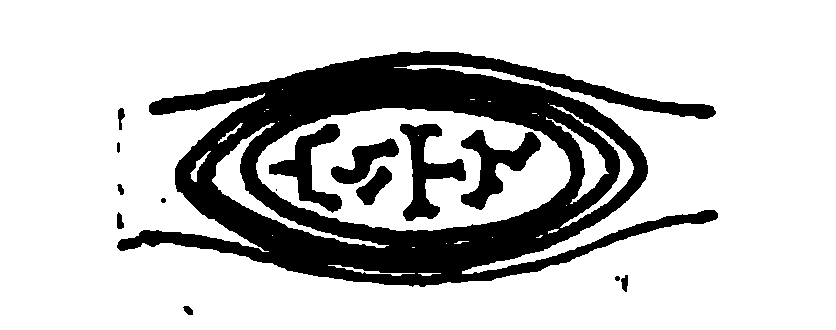
A seal of Bishop Avit

The letters of Avitus are of considerable importance for the ecclesiastical and political history of the years between 499 and 518. Like his contemporary, Ennodius of Pavia, he was strenuous in his assertion of the authority of the Apostolic See as the chief bulwark of religious unity and the incipient Christian civilization. "If the pope," he says, "is rejected, it follows that not one bishop, the whole episcopate threatens to fall" (Si papa urbis vocatur in dubium, episcopatus videbitur, non episcopus, vaccilare. — Ep. xxxiv; ed. Peiper). His letters are also among the important primary sources of early Merovingian political, ecclesiastical, and social history. Among them is a famous letter to Clovis on the occasion of his baptism. Avitus addresses Clovis not as if he was a pagan convert, but as if he was a recent Arian sympathiser, possibly even a catechumen. The letters document the close relations between the Catholic Bishop of Vienne and the Arian king of the Burgundians, the great Gundobad, and his son, the Catholic convert Sigismund.

There was once extant a collection of his homilies and sermons, but they have all perished except for two, and some fragments and excerpts from others.

The so-called Dialogues with King Gundobad, written to defend the Catholic faith against the Arians and which purports to represent the famous Colloquy of Lyon in 449, was once believed to be his work. Julien Havet demonstrated in 1885, however, that it is a forgery of the Oratorian, Jérôme Vignier, who also forged a letter purporting to be from Pope Symmachus to Avitus.

=== Editions ===
==== Letters ====
- Avitus of Vienne, Selected Letters and Prose. Tr. by Danuta Shanzer and Ian Wood. Liverpool: Liverpool University Press, 2002, 464 pp. (Translated Texts for Historians).

==== Poems ====
- Michael Roberts, ed. and trans., Biblical and Pastoral Poetry, Dumbarton Oaks Medieval Library 74 (Cambridge, Mass.: Harvard University Press, 2022).
- Ulrich C.J. Gebhardt, ed. and trans. (Latin-German), De spiritalis historiae gestis. Von den Ereignissen der geistlichen Geschichte, Sammlung Tusculum (Berlin/Boston: De Gruyter, 2021).
- Nicole Hecquet-Noti, ed., Histoire spirituelle, Tome II: (Chants IV-V), Sources Chretiennes 492 (Paris: Les Editions du Cerf, 2005).
- M. Hoffman, ed., Alcimus Ecdicius Avitus. De spiritalis historiae gestis Buch 3 (Munich: K.G. Saur, 2005).
- George W. Shea, trans., The Poems of Alcimus Ecdicius Avitus (Tempe, Ariz.: Medieval & Renaissance Texts & Studies, 1997).
- Daniel J. Nodes, ed., The Fall of Man: De spiritalis historiae gestis libri I-III, Edited from Laon, Bibliothèque Municipale, Ms. 273, Toronto Medieval Latin Texts 16 (Toronto: Pontifical Institute of Medieval Studies, 1985).
- Abraham Schippers, ed., De mundi initi (Kampen: Kok, 1945).
