= Syagrii =

Aristocratic family in late antique Gaul

The Syagrii were an aristocratic family in late antique Gaul during the fourth and fifth centuries. The family was particularly associated with Gallia Lugdunensis (Lyons), and their family seat was located in the area of Augustodunum (Autun).

Important members of the family were:

- Flavius Syagrius, Consul in 381.
- Afranius Syagrius, Consul in 382
- Aegidius, magister militum per Gallias under Majorian from 458, and ruler of the Roman rump state of Soissons (Noviodunum) from 461 to his death in 464 or 465.
- Syagrius, son of the preceding, Roman general and ruler of the rump state of Soissons from 464 to 486.
- Desideratus of Verdun (d. 554), bishop of Verdun and father of Syagrius of Autun.
- Syagrius of Autun, Bishop of Autun (d. 600) son of Desideratus of Verdun.
- Sigrada of Alsace, (d. 689) mother of Count Warin of Poitiers
