= Diocese of Valence =

Catholic diocese in France

Coordinates: 44.93°N 4.89°E

Diocese of Valence (–Die–Saint-Paul-Trois-Châteaux) Dioecesis Valentinensis (–Diensis–Sancti Pauli Tricastinorum) Diocèse de Valence (–Die–Saint-Paul-Trois-Châteaux)

Catholic
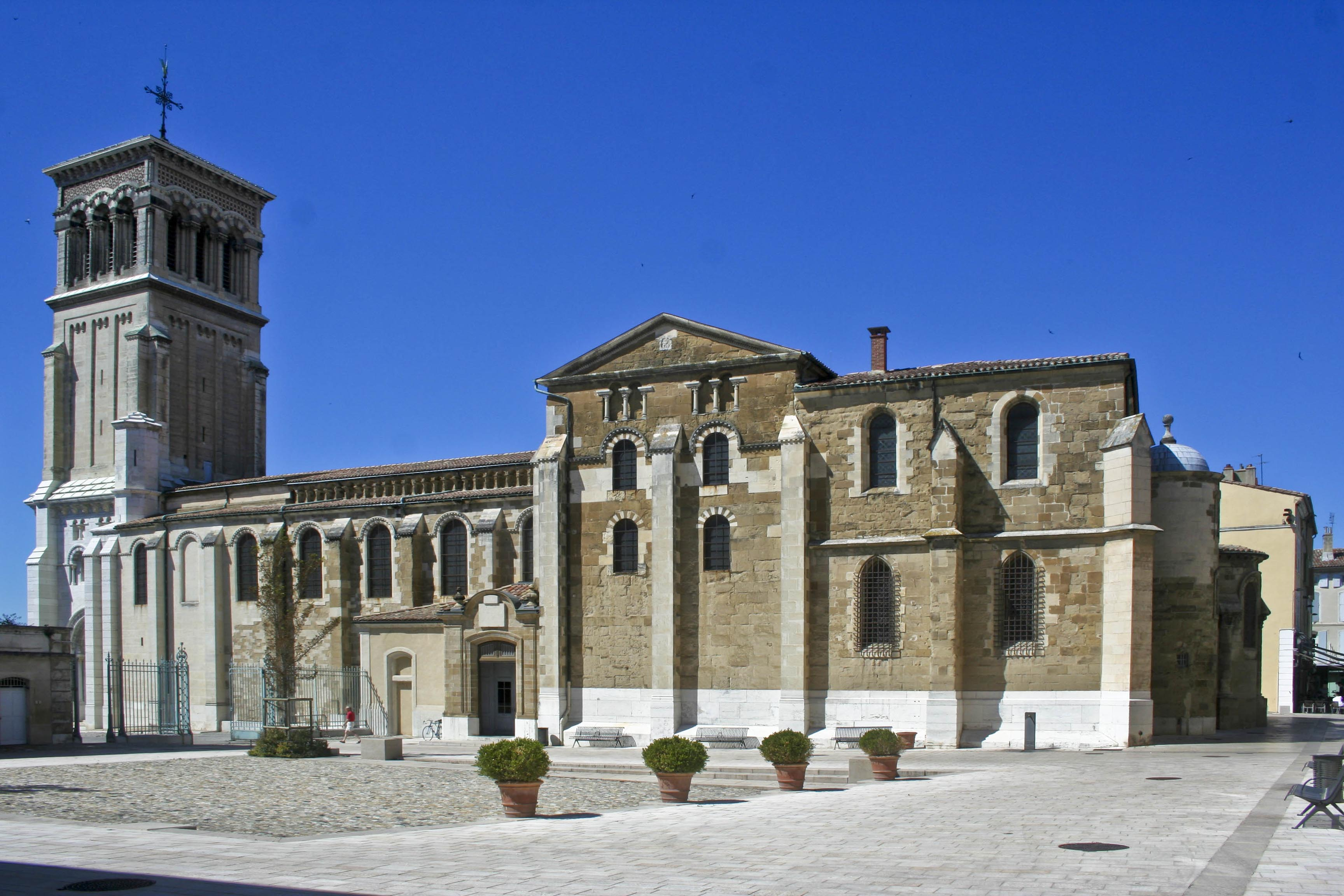
- Cathedral of St. Apollinaris, Valence

Location
- Country: France
- Ecclesiastical province: Lyon
- Metropolitan: Archdiocese of Lyon

Statistics
- Area: 6,522 km^{2} (2,518 sq mi)
- Population: Total; Catholics: (as of 2022); 516,762 ▲; 298,000 (est.)▲

Information
- Denomination: Roman Catholic
- Rite: Roman Rite
- Cathedral: Cathedral Basilica of St. Apollinaris of Valence
- Patron saint: St. Apollinaris of Valence
- Secular priests: 68 diocesan▼59 (Religious Orders)▼37 Permanent Deacons▲

Current leadership
- Pope: Leo XIV
- Bishop: François Durand
- Metropolitan Archbishop: Olivier de Germay

Map

Website
- Website of the Diocese

The Diocese of Valence (–Die–Saint-Paul-Trois-Châteaux) (Latin: Dioecesis Valentinensis (–Diensis–Sancti Pauli Tricastinorum); French: Diocèse de Valence (–Die–Saint-Paul-Trois-Châteaux) is a Latin Church diocese of the Catholic Church in southern France. The contemporary diocese is co-extensive with the department of Drôme.

== History ==
Christianity was preached in Valence c. 200, by disciples of Irenaeus of Lyon, but the bishopric is first attested in 347, when Bishop Aemilianus attended the council of Sardica.

The Cathedral of Valence was originally dedicated to the martyrs Pope Cornelius (251–253) and Bishop Cyprianus of Carthage (248–258).), and, on 5 August 1095, during his visit to France to rouse up the aristocracy for a Crusade to liberate the Holy Land, Pope Urban II rededicated the cathedral to the Virgin Mary and the martyrs Cornelius and Cyprian. The dedication to Saint Apollinaire was added later. The cathedral was administered by a corporation called the Chapter, which consisted of three dignities (a Dean, a Provost, the Archdeacon, the Theologian) fourteen Canons, and the Abbot of S. Felix.

=== Bishop-elect Guillaume de Savoy ===
According to Matthew of Paris, Guillaume de Savoy, the procurator of the Church of Valence, left for England in 1236. His niece, Eleanor of Provence, married King Henry III of England on 14 January 1236, and Guillaume was made a principal advisor of the king. At the parliament which met in London in April 1236, however, the Savoyards were the subject of criticism, and Guillaume left England, visited his niece Margaret of Provence, the queen of France, and by 25 June he was back in Savoy, at Chillon. He returned to England in 1237, and was present in York at the signing of the treaty between Scotland and England on 25 September 1237, negotiated by the papal legate Otho Candidus. Shortly thereafter, he joined the expedition of Henri de Trubeville sent by Henry III to assist his brother-in-law, Frederick II, at Milan. Guillaume met the emperor at Brescia, and obtained from him a confirmation of all the ancient privileges of the diocese of Valence, and investiture with the regalian rights belonging to the diocese.

When Bishop Pierre des Roches of Winchester died on 9 June 1238, King Henry wished the electors to choose his uncle, Guillaume de Savoy as the next bishop, but the electors voted instead for Guillaume de Rale. The king immediately voided the election. The monks then elected the bishop of Chichester, Ralph de Neville, and the king again voided the election. The king then demanded that the pope appoint Guillaume by papal bull. Gregory IX was happy to do so, because it would please the king and because it would detach the House of Savoy from the party of Frederick II.

Guillaume de Savoy left England permanently shortly after January 1238. On 1 May 1238, the bishop of Liège, Joannes de Rumigny, died. Cardinal Otho, the papal legate in England, immediately wrote to the canons, recommending that they elect Guillaume de Savoy. The cathedral Chapter met on 23 (or 25) June 1238, and elected Otho, the Provost of Aix-la-chapelle, to the vacant seat. Guillaume's brother Thomas brought up troops, and drove the opposition away. They then appealed to the pope. On 18 November 1238, and again on 23 January 1239, Pope Gregory IX ordered inquiries, and on 29 May 1239, he issued a bull granting the dioceses of Liège, Winchester, and Valence to Guillaume of Savoy.

In mid-August 1239, Guillaume, his brother Count Amadeus IV, the Marquis de Lancia, and the seneschal of the Dauphiné set out for Italy with an army. Having met with the pope, and briefed him on the disordered state of the diocese of Valence, Guillaume was appointed by Pope Gregory as leader of the papal army against Frederick II. He died at Viterbo on 1 September 1239, apparently of poison. On 6 December 1239, Bishop Geroldus of Valence, Patriarch of Jerusalem since 1225, died in Jerusalem.

=== Boniface of Savoy and Philippe of Savoy ===
In arranging for his own bulls for Winchester and Liège, Guillaume de Savoy also obtained from Gregory IX the concession that one of his brothers would succeed him in Valence. It is almost universally agreed that this brother was Boniface de Savoy. Jules Chavalier points out, however, that the grant of Gregory IX does not name a particular brother, and that there is no document that names Boniface in connection with Valence, neither as bishop-elect nor as administrator nor as procurator. The bull of his appointment as archbishop of Canterbury names him only as bishop-elect of Belley.

In mid-August 1242, Boniface's brother Philippe was in Bordeaux with King Henry III and his niece Queen Eleanor; he returned with the royal couple to England in September. In a marriage contract, confirmed on 6 December 1242, the guarantors include Boniface, elect of Belley, and Philippe, elect of Valence. Barthélémy Hauréau has pointed out, however, that Philippe had not been canonically elected bishop; papal documents referred to him as procurator. In spring 1244, Philippe petitioned the new pope, Innocent IV (Fieschi), to absolve him from the responsibility for the church of Valence (ipsum absolvere a cura praefatae ecclesiae) so that he could attend a university. The pope agreed to absolve him, and ordered the archbishop of Vienne to have the Chapter of the cathedral of Valence to conduct a canonical election of a new bishop. Nothing came of the permission to pursue education or the mandate to elect a bishop.

In the last week of November 1244, Philippe, the procurator of Valence, escorted Pope Innocent, who was fleeing Frederick II, from Savoy to Lyon, where he remained to guard the pope during the Council of Lyon (26 June–17 July 1245). After the council had concluded, Archbishop Aimery, the Primate of Lyon, requested that the pope allow him to retire, which the pope, very reluctantly, after pleading with him to change his mind, allowed his request. Innocent IV appointed Philippe de Savoie administrator of the diocese of Lyon, while allowing him to retain his position in the diocese of Valence as well as his benefices in England and Flanders. On 30 October 1246, he styles himself Nos Ph(ilippus), Dei gratia prime Lugdunensis ecclesiae electus; and on 18 December 1246, he is referred to as Valentiae electus by one of his officials.

On 5 December 1248, a church council was held in Valence, presided over by Cardinal Petrus, Bishop of Albano, and Cardinal Hugh, Cardinal-priest of Santa Sabina, and including the metropolitan archbishops of Narbonne, Vienne, Arles, and Aix, and fifteen bishops; the bishop-elect of Valence is not named. The council promulgated 23 canons.

On 5 March 1250, King Henry III of England appointed Bishop-elect Philippe de Savoie as his plenipotentiary to negotiate an extension of the truce between England and France.

In 1266, the new pope, Clement IV, who had been legal advisor to Count Raymond of Toulouse and to King Louis IX and was later archbishop of Narbonne, undertook to restore civil and ecclesiastical order in Valence. He wrote a letter to the archbishops of Embrun and Tarentaise, instructing them to inform the Chapter of the cathedral of Valence that Philippe de Savoie had voluntarily resigned the diocese of Valence. They were ordered to take charge of the accounts of his heavily indebted administration, and within three months the diocesan electors were to choose someone who was worthy of being bishop.

When the electors met, they chose to appoint a committee to choose the candidate: the dean of the Chapter, the provost of Bourg, and the abbot of S. Felix. They chose Guy de Montlaur, the dean of Le Puy, and the dean of Valence announced the name in the Chapter. But opposition arose from the Provost Roger de Clérieu and others, and they appealed to the pope. The majority and their candidate applied to the metropolitan in Vienne for confirmation, but, since the seat was vacant, the Chapter of Vienne took it upon themselves to ratify the election. This too was appealed to the pope. Clement IV spent some time in consultation with his cardinals, and eventually voided the election on 6 October 1268. The Provost Roger de Clérieu appealed to Pope Clement to declare his acts void in accordance with the bull of 6 October 1268. The pope died on 29 November 1268, setting off a papal election that lasted two years and nine months. Guy functioned as administrator, with the approval of Pope Clement, and his administratorship was continued by Pope Gregory X. Having been refused its choice, the Chapter of Valence conducted another election and chose Archbishop Bertrand of Arles, but there was no pope in office to authorize his transfer. Bishop-elect Guy de Montlaur was already dead by 30 September 1275, the day on which Pope Gregory X appointed Abbot Amadeus of Savigny to be bishop of Valence.

=== Valence-et-Die ===
In a letter of 14 May 1239, to the archbishops of Vienne and Embrun, Pope Gregory IX broached the subject of uniting the two dioceses of Valence and Die, which were contiguous, only 42 km (26 mi) apart, but were also in two different ecclesiastical provinces. As had been reported to him, both the nobles and the general populace were repeatedly out of control, sometimes causing people to flee into exile. The two archbishops were ordered to inquire as to the necessity and feasibility of combining the dioceses in order to establish greater ecclesiastical control of their insolence. Nothing came of the project, since Gregory became fully engaged in the consequences of the Emperor Frederick's gaining complete control of northern and central Italy; Gregory died on 22 August 1241.

Pope Gregory X visited Valence on 13 September 1275, and stayed there for several days. Two weeks later he was in Vienne, where, on 30 September 1275, he signed the bull "Valentiniensem et Diensem." The bull repeated verbatim the complaints of Gregory IX's letter of 1239, and then ordered that the two dioceses be united permanently under one bishop. When a vacancy occurred, the canons of both cathedrals should meet together as one college, in alternate places, beginning with Valence. There was to be no change in canonries, prebends, or revenues. The metropolitan was to be the archbishop of Vienne.

=== The schism ===
In the Great Western Schism (1378–1417), the Bishops of Valence-et-Die were all appointed by and were loyal to the popes of the Avignon Obedience.

The University of Valence was founded by the Dauphin Louis, by letters patent granted on 26 July 1452. The bishops of Valence were ex officio grand chancellors of the university. Louis took care to enlist the support of the papacy, sending an ambassador who obtained a bull from Pope Pius II, dated 3 May 1459, for the canonical erection of a university at Valence. There was a faculty of law, with four chairs; a faculty of theology, with two chairs; and a faculty of medicine, with two chairs, and then only one.

=== The French Revolution ===
Pope Pius VI, who had been taken prisoner and deported from Italy by troops of the French Directory, was imprisoned in the fortress of Valence. Imprisonment was the idea of the directors of the département de Drôme. On 22 July 1799, the Directorate of the French Republic ordered that the pope be brought to Dijon by way of Lyon, but a doctor of Valence certified that the pope was ill, and that his departure had to be deferred. He was sufficiently recovered to participate in the ceremonies of the Feast of the Assumption (15 August), but the next day his health suddenly worsened. After six weeks in Valence he died, on the morning of 29 August 1799, at the age of 81. His body was buried in the chapel, On 30 December 1799, a discussion was held in Paris by the Consuls of the French Republic, resulting in a decision to repudiate any responsibility and to order a public funeral. On 2 January 1800, the Minister of the Interior, Lucien Bonaparte, wrote to the administrators of the departement of Drôme, ordering a public funeral and a simple monument; the funeral took place on 30 January. On 2 December 1801, First Consul Bonaparte gave orders allowing the remains to given to Monsignor Giuseppe Spina, Archbishop of Corinth, to be taken to Rome from Valence "with decency but without pomp," in the words of Talleyrand. The pope's heart, however, was retained in Valence.

On 29 November 1801, in the concordat of 1801 between the French Consulate, headed by First Consul Napoleon Bonaparte, and Pope Pius VII, the bishopric of Valence and all the other dioceses were suppressed. This removed all the contaminations and novelties introduced by the Constitutional Church. The pope then recreated the French ecclesiastical order, respecting in most ways the changes introduced during the Revolution, including the reduction in the number of archdioceses and dioceses. In 1801, when the archdiocese of Vienne was suppressed, the archdiocese of Lyon became the metropolitan of the diocese of Valence. The diocese of Saint-Paul-trois-châteaux (Tricastrensis), which had been a suffragan of the archdiocese of Arles, was also suppressed on 29 November 1801, and its territory incorporated into the diocese of Valence.

== Bishops ==
=== To 1000 ===
- Aemilianus (347–374)
- Sextius (374–?)
- Maximus (I) (c. 417–419)
- Cariatho (attested 442)
- Apollinaris (attested 517)
- Gallus (attested 549)
- Maximus (II) (attested c. 567)
- Ragnoaldus (attested 581–585)
- Elephas (?)
- Agilulf (641–?)

[Waldus (?–650)]

- Ingildus (Angilde) (ca. 650–658)
- Abbo (Bobo) (c. 678)
- Salvius (I) (?)
- Antonius (I)
- Bonitus (ca. 788)
- Salvius II. (Carolingian)
- Luperosus (Lupicinus) (attested 804)
- Lambert I. (?–835)
- Ado (835–842)
- Dunctrannus (842–855)
- Eilard ?–?
- Brokhard ?–?
- Argimbert ?–?
- Agilde (?–858)
- Ratbertus (Robert) (attested 858–879)
- Isaac (attested 886–899)
- Aimericus (?)
- Remegarius (before 909 – after 924)
- Odilbert (947–950)
- Aimon (960–981)
- Guigues (Guy) (994–997)
- Lambert II. (997–1001)

=== 1000 to 1300 ===
- Remegaire II. (1001–1016)
- Guigues II. (1016–1025)
- Humbert d´Albon (1028–1030)
- Ponç Adhemar (1031–1056)
- Odo I. (1058–1060)
- Raiginari (1060–1063)
- Gontard (1063–1100)
- Henric I. (1100–1107)
- Eustache (1107–1141)
- Jean (I) (1141–1146)
- Bernard (1146–1154)
- Odo II.de Crussol (1154–1183)
- Lantelm (1183–1187)
- Falco (1187–1200)
- Humbert de Miribel (1200–1220)
- Gerald of Lausanne (1220–1225)
- Guillaume de Savoie Bishop-elect (1225–1239)

Bonifatius of Savoy (1239–1242) Administrator

- Philip of Savoy Administrator (Procurator) (1242–1266)
- Guy (III) de Montlaur (1268–1275) Administrator

[Bertrand de St. Martin (1268)]

(From 1276 to 1678 the diocese was united with the diocese of Dié)

- Amadeus de Roussillon (1275–1281)
- Philippe de Bernusson (1281–1282)
  - Henri of Geneva (rejected by the Pope)
- Jean of Geneva, O.S.B. (13 February 1283 – 1297)
- Guillaume del Roussillon (1297–1331)

=== 1300 to 1500 ===
- Adhemar de la Voulte (1331–1336)
- Henri de Villars (1336–1342)
- Pierre de Chastelux (1342–1350)
- Godofred (1350–1354)
- Louis de Villars (1354–1376)
- Guillaume de la Voulte (1378–1383) Avignon Obedience
- Amadeus de Saluzzo (1383–1389) Administrator Avignon Obedience
- Henri (II) (1389–1390)
- Jean de Poitiers (1390–1448)
- Louis of Poitiers (26 July 1447 – 26 April 1468)
- Gerard de Crussol (13 May 1468 – 28 August 1472)
- Jacques de Bathernay (1472–1474)
- Antoine de Balzac (1474–1491)
- Jean d'Épinay (16 November 1491 – 3 January 1503)

=== 1500 to 1800 ===
- Cardinal Francisco Lloris y de Borja (1503–1505) Administrator

Urbain de Miolan (1505)

- Gaspard de Tournon (13 February 1505 – 1520)
- Cardinal Jean de Lorraine (1520–1522)
- Antoine Duprat (1522–1524)
- François-Guillaume de Castelnau de Clermont-Lodève (1523–1531)
- Antoine de Vesc (1531–1537)
- Jacques de Tournon (1537–1553)
- Jean de Montluc (1553–1579)
- Charles I. de Leberon (1579–1598)
- Pierre-André de Leberon (1598–1621)
- Charles de Leberon (1623–1654)
- Daniel de Cosnac (1654–1687)
- Guillaume Bochart de Champigny (1687–1705)
- Jean de Catellan (1705–1725)
- Alexandre de Milon (1725–1771)
- Pierre-François de Grave (1772–1787)
- Gabriel-Melchior de Messey (1788–1801)
- Sede Vacante (1795–1801)
  - François Marbos (1791–1795) (constitutional bishop)

=== From 1800 ===
- François Bécherel (1802– 25 Jun 1815 Died)
- Marie-Joseph-Antoine-Laurent de la Rivoire de La Tourette (8 Aug 1817 Appointed – 3 Apr 1840 Died)
- Pierre Chatrousse (26 May 1840 Appointed – 17 May 1857 Died)
- Jean-Paul-François-Marie-Félix Lyonnet (1857–1865)
- Nicolas-Edouard-François Gueullette (1865–1875)
- Charles-Pierre-François Cotton (16 Jan 1875 Appointed – 25 Sep 1905 Died)
- Jean-Victor-Emile Chesnelong (21 Feb 1906 Appointed – 12 Jan 1912)
- Emmanuel-Marie-Joseph-Anthelme Martin de Gibergues (7 Feb 1912 Appointed – 28 Dec 1919 Died)
- Désiré-Marie-Joseph-Antelne-Martin Paget (22 Apr 1920 Appointed – 11 Jan 1932 Died)
- Camille Pic (16 Aug 1932 Appointed – 25 Nov 1951 Died)
- Joseph-Martin Urtasun (10 Aug 1952 Appointed – 17 Sep 1955)
- Charles-Marie-Paul Vignancour (18 Dec 1957 Appointed – 6 Mar 1966)
- Jean-Barthélemy-Marie de Cambourg (6 Mar 1966 Appointed – 1 Dec 1977 Resigned)
- Didier-Léon Marchand (8 Sep 1978 Appointed – 11 Dec 2001 Retired)
- Jean-Christophe Lagleize (11 Dec 2001 Appointed – 24 June 2014)
- Pierre-Yves Michel (4 Apr 2014 Appointed – 6 April 2023)
- François Durand (5 Jan 2024–)

== See also ==
- Ancient Diocese of Die

== Books and articles ==
=== Reference books ===
- Gams, Pius Bonifatius (1873). Series episcoporum Ecclesiae catholicae: quotquot innotuerunt a beato Petro apostolo. Ratisbon: Typis et Sumptibus Georgii Josephi Manz. pp. 648–649. (Use with caution; obsolete)
- Eubel, Conradus, ed. (1913). Hierarchia catholica (in Latin). Vol. 1 (second ed.). Münster: Libreria Regensbergiana. pp. 512–513.
- Eubel, Conradus, ed. (1914). Hierarchia catholica (in Latin). Vol. 2 (second ed.). Münster: Libreria Regensbergiana. p. 262.
- Eubel, Conradus, ed. (1923). Hierarchia catholica (in Latin). Vol. 3 (second ed.). Münster: Libreria Regensbergiana. p. 326
- Gauchat, Patritius (Patrice) (1935). Hierarchia catholica (in Latin). Vol. IV (1592–1667). Münster: Libraria Regensbergiana. p. 357.
- Ritzler, Remigius; Sefrin, Pirminus (1952). Hierarchia catholica medii et recentis aevi (in Latin). Vol. V (1667–1730). Patavii: Messagero di S. Antonio. p. 403.
- Ritzler, Remigius; Sefrin, Pirminus (1958). Hierarchia catholica medii et recentis aevi (in Latin). Vol. VI (1730–1799). Patavii: Messagero di S. Antonio. p. 430.

=== Studies ===
- Blanc, André (1984). La Cathédrale de Valence: témoin de l'humanité romane (in French). Valence: Editions peuple libre. pp. 28 ff.
- Catellan, Jean de (Bishop) (1724). Les antiquités de l'Eglise de Valence (in French). Valence: Jean Gilibert.
- Chevalier, C. U. J. (1867). Notice chronologico-historique sur les Evêques de Valence (in French). Valence: Jules Céas et fils.
- Chevalier, Jules (1889). Quarante années de l'histoire des évêques de Valence au Moyen Age: Guillaume et Philippe de Savoie 1226–1267 (in French). Paris: Picard.
- Chevalier, Jules (1919). L'église constitutionnelle et la persécution religieuse dans le département de la Drôme pendant la révolution: 1790–1801. (in French). Valence: Impr. Jules Céas, 1919.
- Chevalier, Ulysse (1891). Description analytique du cartulaire du chapitre de Saint-Maurice de Vienne: Suivie d'un Appendice de chartes et Chronique inédite des Evêques de Valence et de Die. (in French and Latin). Valence: Imprimerie de Jules Céas et fils, 1891.
- Chevalier, Ulysse (1912). Regeste dauphinois ou Répertoire chronologique et analytique des documents imprimés en manucrits relatifs à l'histoire du Dauphiné des origines chrétiennes à l'année 1349, (in French and Latin) Volume 1. Valence: Imprimerie valentinoise, 1912. Vol 2 (1913). Vol. 3 (1914). Vol. 4 (1915). Vol. 5 (1921). Vol. 6 (1923). Vol. 7 (1926).
- Delpal, Bernard (1989). Entre paroisse et commune: les catholiques de la Drôme au milieu du XIXe siècles (in French). Valence: Centre André-Latreille..
- Duchesne, Louis (1907). Fastes épiscopaux de l'ancienne Gaule: I. Provinces du Sud-Est. Paris: Fontemoing. second edition (in French) pp. 215–225.
- Ferragut, Catherine; Marcel, Régine; Delpal, Bernard (1982). La presse religieuse catholique du diocèse de Valence de 1892 à 1944 (in French). Valence: Archives départmentales, Centre de documentation universitaire. ISBN 978-2-86026-003-9.
- Font-Réaulx, M. J. (1926), "Les chroniques des évêques de Valence," (in French), in: Bulletin de la Société d'archéologie et de statistique de la Drôme Vol. 58 (Valence 1925), pp. 289–306; Vol. 59, 229 livraison (Valence 1926), pp. 62–71.
- Halfond, Gregory I. (2010). "Appendix A. Frankish Councils, 511-768". Archaeology of Frankish Church Councils, AD 511–768. Boston-Leiden: Brill. pp. 223–246. ISBN 978-90-04-17976-9.
- Hauréau, Barthélemy, ed. (1865). Gallia Christiana: In Provincias Ecclesiasticas Distributa, De provincia Viennensi (in Latin). Vol. 16 (Tomus XVI). Paris: Typographia Regia. pp. 290–372.
- Hefele, Karl Joseph (1895). A History of the Councils of the Church, from the Original Documents. By the Right Rev. Charles Joseph Hefele ... Vol. IV. A.D. 451-A.D. 680. Edinburgh: T. & T. Clark.
- Hefele, Karl Joseph (1896). A History of the Councils of the Church, from the Original Documents. By the Right Rev. Charles Joseph Hefele ... Vol. V. A.D. 626-A.D. 787. Edinburgh: T. & T. Clark.
- Hefele, Karl Joseph (1907). Histoire des conciles d'après les documents originaux. Vol. III. part 2 (A.D. 788–814). Paris: Letouzey et Ané.
- Nidal, J.C. (1861). Histoire de l'Université de Valence, et des autres établissements d'instruction de cette ville. (in French). Valence: Impr. E. Marc Aurel, 1861.
- Perrot, J. (1922). La basilique de Saint-Apollinaire: (cathédrale de Valence) (in French). Valence: J. Céas imp.
- Un Chanoine de la Cathédrale (1895). Histoire des séminaires du diocèse de Valence (in French). Valence: J. Céas & fils.
- Société bibliographique (France) (1907). L'épiscopat français depuis le Concordat jusqu'à la Séparation (1802–1905). Paris: Librairie des Saints-Pères.
