= Christianity in Gaul =

Gaul was an important early center of Latin Christianity during late antiquity and the Merovingian period. By the mid-3rd century, several churches had been organized in Roman Gaul. In 314, shortly after the end of persecution, the bishops of the Latin world assembled at Arles. The Church of Gaul faced three major crises during the late Roman period: Arianism, Priscillianism, and Pelagianism. Under Merovingian rule, a number of "Frankish synods" were held, reflecting a particularly Germanic development in the Western Church. A model for these later synods was set by Clovis I, who organized the First Council of Orléans in 511.

== Establishment of Christianity in Gaul ==
No records survive of how Christianity first reached Gaul. The 1913 Catholic Encyclopedia speculates that early missionaries may have arrived at Marseille by sea and continued up the river Rhône to the central metropolis of Lyon. Missionaries from Asia, such as Saint Pothinus and his successor Irenaeus (both disciples of Polycarp), established the faith more firmly. As a result, the Christian communities of Lyon and Vienne were "predominantly of eastern background" and maintained close ties with the community in Rome.

The first mention of Christianity in Roman Gaul dates to 177 and the persecution in Lyon, the province's religious center. The sole account of this persecution is a letter written by the Christians of Lyon and Vienne implying that the Church of Lyon was the only organized church in Gaul at the time.

The forty-eight martyrs of Lyon (ancient Lugdunum) represented every rank of Gallo-Roman society. Among them were aristocrat Vettius Epagathus; physician Attalus of Pergamus; Saint Pothinus, neophyte Maturus, deacon Sanctus from the Church; and young slaves Blandina and Ponticus.

Eusebius mentions letters from by the Churches of Gaul which brought the Church of Gaul into prominence. By the end of the 2nd century, an inscription found at Autun records Pectorius celebrating the Ichthys, a symbol of the Eucharist. A third event involving the bishops of Gaul was the Novatian controversy, in which Bishop Faustinus of Lyon and other colleagues opposed Novatian, whereas Marcianus of Arles supported him.

=== Local legends ===
Local legends attribute the founding of principal sees in Gaul to the Apostles or their immediate successors. In the Middle Ages, many legends grew up in support of such claims, which were flattering to local vanity. The evangelization of Gaul has often been attributed to missionaries sent from Rome by St. Clement. This theory led to a series of fallacious narratives and forgeries, complicating historical records.

=== Gregory of Tours ===
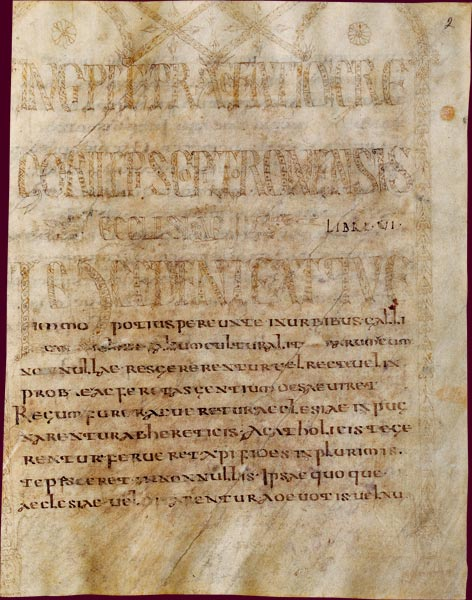
Frontispiece of the Historia Francorum, in which Gregory of Tours gives an account of the evangelisation of Gaul.

In the Historia Francorum, Gregory of Tours claims that, in 250, Rome sent seven bishops to Gaul to found the following churches:

- The Diocese of Tours by Gatianus
- The Diocese of Arles by Trophimus
- The Diocese of Narbonne by Paul
- The Diocese of Toulouse by Saturninus
- The Diocese of Paris by Denis
- The Diocese of Clermont by Austromoine
- The Diocese of Limoges by Martialis

The 1913 Catholic Encyclopedia finds Gregory's account more credible than local legends, but notes that he wrote three hundred years after the event and highlighted chronological issues with his account.

== Spread of Christianity ==
Cyprian describes several churches in Gaul by the middle of the third century largely unaffected by the Diocletianic Persecution due to the influence of Constantius Chlorus, who was not hostile to Christianity.

The 314 Council of Arles was convened shortly after the end of the persecutions. Surviving documents show that bishops from the following dioceses were in attendance:

- Vienne
- Marseille
- Arles
- Orange
- Vaison
- Apt
- Nice
- Lyon
- Autun
- Cologne
- Trier
- Reims
- Rouen
- Bordeaux
- Gabali
- Eauze
- Toulouse
- Narbonne
- Clermont
- Bourges
- Paris

=== Among the educated ===
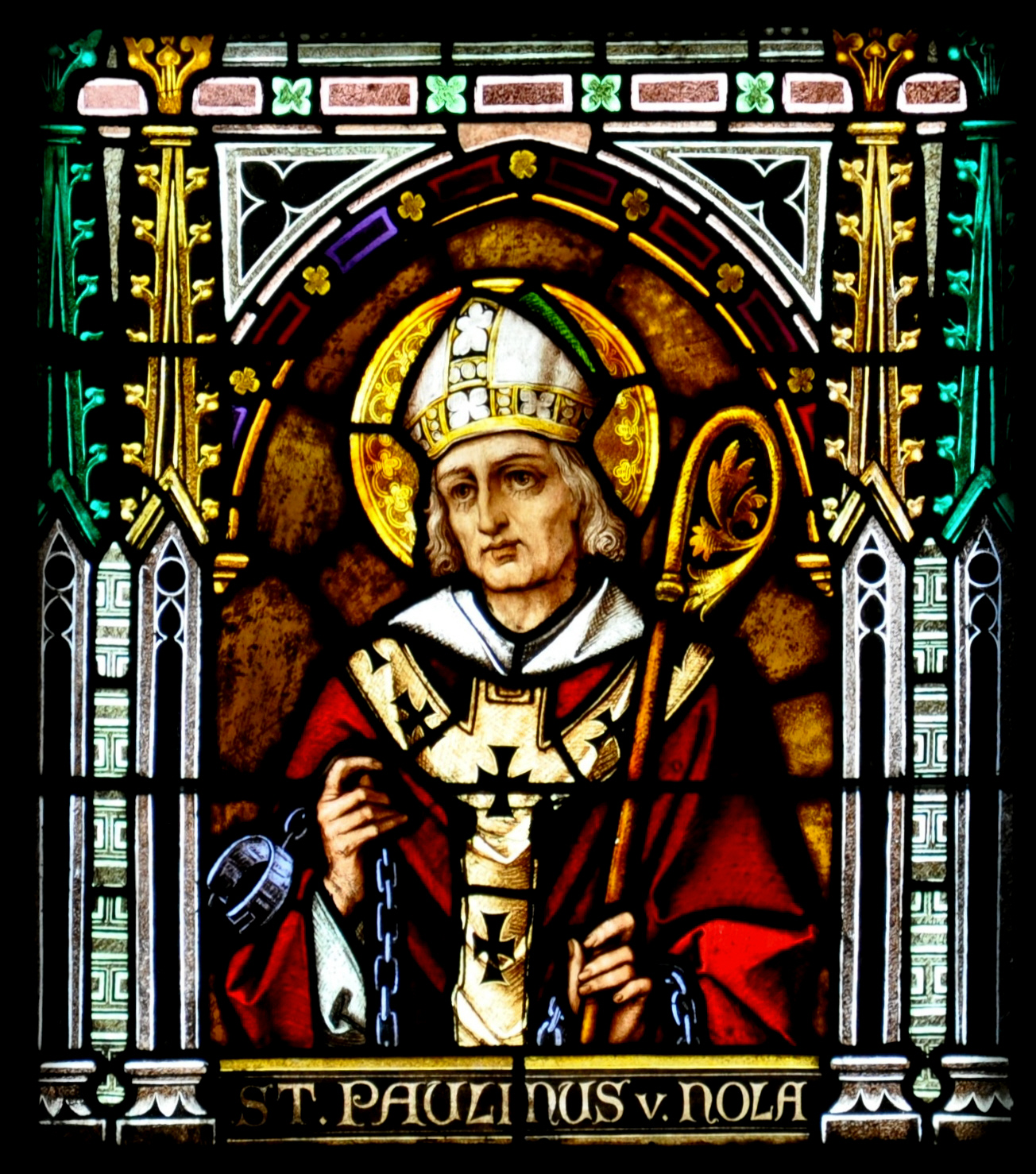
Paulinus, an early Christian intellectual in Gaul.

During the 4th and 5th centuries, Christianity gradually spread among the educated classes in Gaul. The poet Ausonius may have converted to Christianity; his pupil Paulinus entered a monastery, sparking controversy among his peers. Non-Christian intellectuals, such as those in the schools of Autun, occasionally praised the virtues of the Christian emperors.

By the close of the 5th century, the majority of scholars in Gaul were Christians, including Salvian, Hilary of Poitiers, Sulpicius Severus, Paulinus of Nola, and Sidonius Apollinaris.

=== In rural areas ===
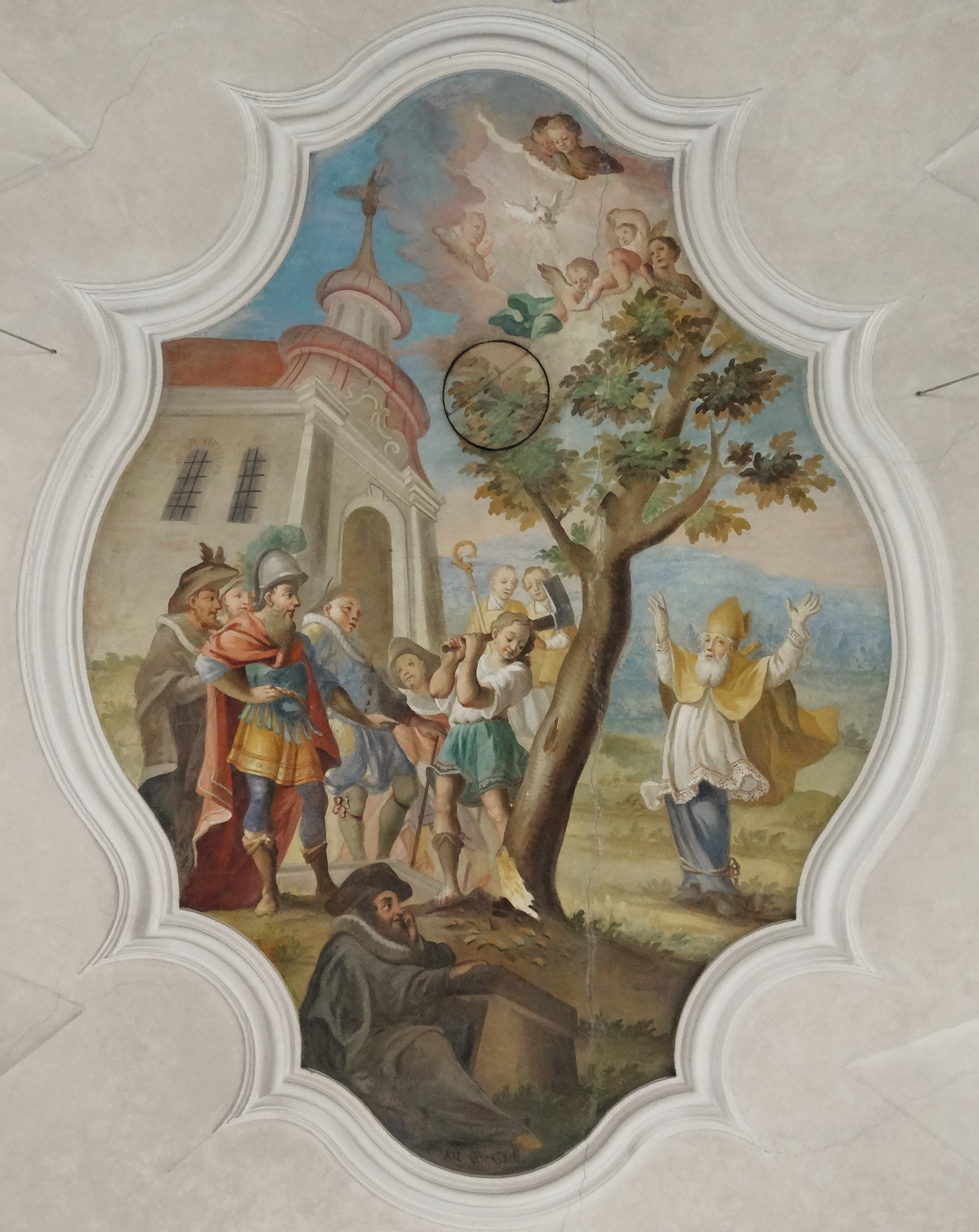
Martin of Tours, depicted felling a sacred tree

Rural areas in Gaul remained strongholds of traditional Gallic, ancient Roman, and syncretic fusions of the two religions. Missionaries such as Martin of Tours, Victricius of Rouen, and Martin of Brives worked, largely unsuccessfully, to eradicate these practices, especially in central Gaul.

In the 6th century, in the city of Arles—one of the regions where Christianity had taken root—Bishop Caesarius was still trying to suppress traditional beliefs.

== Gallic monasticism ==
The Christianization of lower classes was aided by newly established monasteries. In Gaul and elsewhere, the first Christian ascetics kept their personal freedom. Saint Martin and Cassian introduced the practice of religious life; Martin established Marmoutier Abbey near Tours, and Cassian later founded two monasteries at Marseille in 415, having adapted methods from Eastern monks.

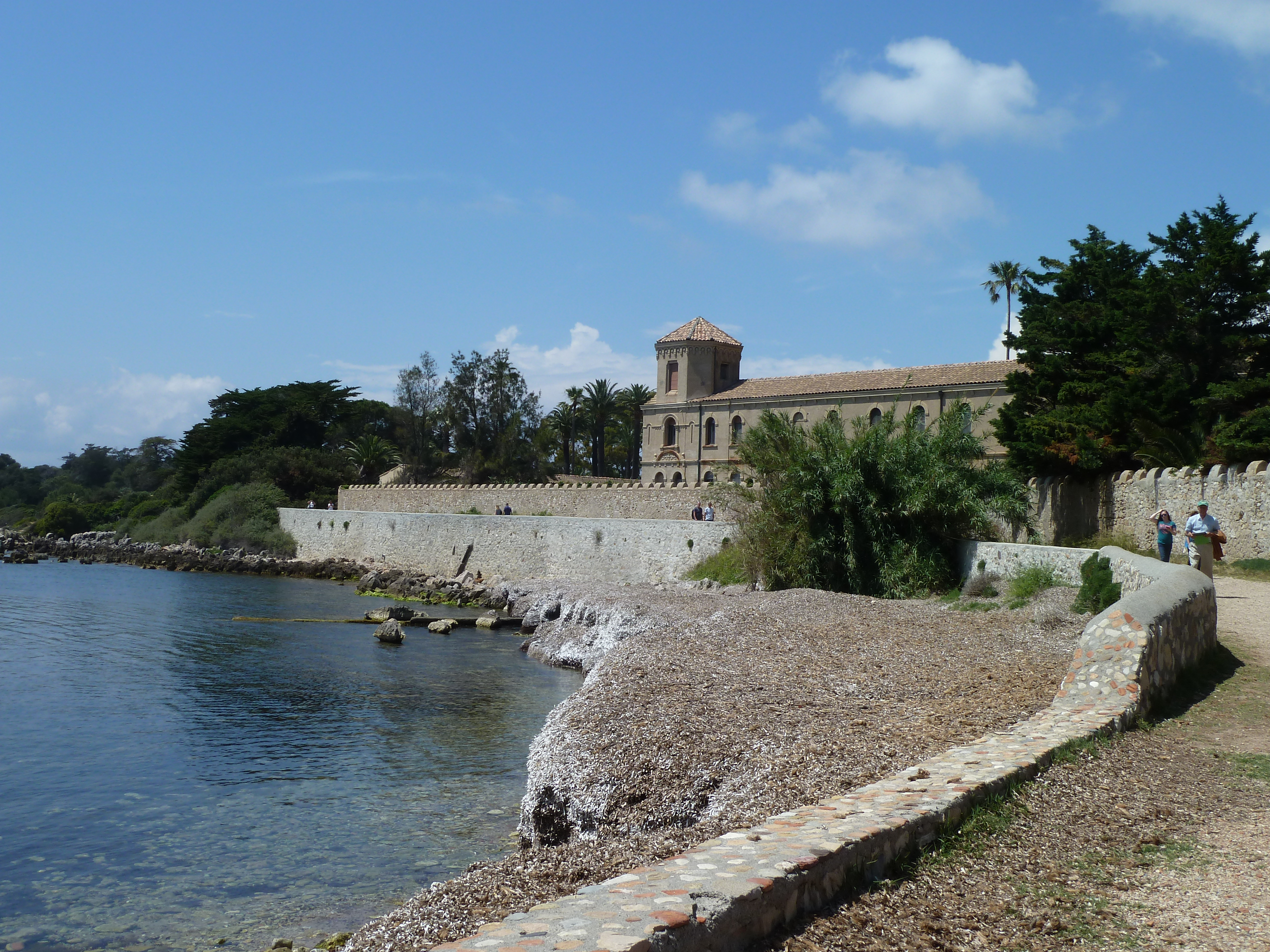
Lérins Abbey

Around the same time, Honoratus founded a monastery on the Lérins Islands near Marseille. Lérins Abbey became a centre of Christian life and ecclesiastical influence. Episcopal sees of Gaul were often objects of competition and greed and rapidly becoming the property of aristocratic families. Lérins took up the work of reforming the episcopate, and placed many of its own sons at the head of dioceses: Honoratus, Hilary, and Caesarius at Arles; Eucherius at Lyon; Salonius at Geneva; Veranius at Vence; Lupus at Troyes; and Maximus and Faustus at Riez.

Lérins too became a school of mysticism and theology and spread its religious ideas through its works on dogma, polemics, and hagiography.

Other monasteries founded in Gaul included Île Barbe, Réomé, Saint-Claude, Collégiale Saint-Mexme de Chinon, and Loches.

Monks had not yet begun to live according to any fixed and codified rule; such written constitutions would only emerge later during the time of Caesarius of Arles. Monasticism initially faced opposition and were denounced by pagan Rutilius Namatianus. Even efforts to make chastity the central virtue of Christianity met resistance, particularly from Vigilantius of Calagurris. Ecclesiastical celibacy laws were less strict and enforced than in Italy and Rome. A series of Gallic councils before the Merovingian epoch reflect both the undecided state of discipline at the time and the continual efforts to establish one.

== Theological strife ==
The Church of Gaul passed through three dogmatic crises.

=== Arianism ===
The bishops of Gaul were largely focused on Arianism and generally upheld the teachings of the Council of Nicaea. Athanasius, who had been exiled to Trier from 336 to 338, exerted a powerful influence on the episcopate of Gaul; and one of the great champions of orthodoxy in the West was Hilary of Poitiers, who was also exiled.

=== Priscillianism ===
Priscillianism was an ideal of Christian life which appealed to all and had a large hold on the masses. It was condemned in 380 at the Synod of Saragossa; nonetheless, it spread rapidly in Central Gaul. When Magnus Maximus executed Priscillian in 385, Saint Martin hesitated but ultimately refused communion with the bishops who had supported the executions.

=== Pelagianism ===
Pelagianism remained a source of division between the bishops and monks of Gaul. Proculus, Bishop of Marseille, had expelled Leporius, a disciple of Pelagius, from Gaul, but it was not long before Marseille and Lérins became hotbeds of a teaching known as Semipelagianism. Prosper of Aquitaine wrote against it, and was obliged to take refuge at Rome. It was not until the beginning of the 6th century that the teaching of Augustine triumphed, when a monk of Lérins, Caesarius of Arles, a follower of Augustine, caused it to be adopted by the 529 Council of Orange.

Around the mid-3rd century, the pope was asked to settle difficulties in the Church of Gaul. The episcopate of Gaul had no head, and the bishops grouped themselves based on friendship or locality. As a result, in 417 Pope Zosimus made Patrocles, Bishop of Arles, his delegate in Gaul, and ordered that all disputes should be referred to him and that no Gallic ecclesiastic could have access to the pope without letters from him.

=== Invasions ===
The great invasion of 407 disrupted Gaul for almost 3 years until they passed over into Spain in 409. Gaul was free of invaders but subjected to civil wars until 413, when the imperial government of Emperor Honorius restored order.

In Gaul, the transition from one regime to another was eased by its bishops, who were frequent intermediaries with Roman authorities. It was long believed that they had been invested with special powers and the official title of defensores civitatum (defenders of the states). Bishops like Sidonius Apollinaris, Avitus, Germanus of Auxerre, and Caesarius of Arles upheld the social fabric. They were guardians of the classical traditions of Latin literature and Roman culture, and were the mainstay of learning.

== Christianity in Merovingian Gaul ==
Throughout the 6th and 7th centuries manuscripts of the Bible and the Church were copied for public worship, ecclesiastical teaching, and Catholic life. The only contemporary buildings that exhibit traces of classical or Byzantine styles are religious edifices.

Regional synods had been held regularly in the Church of Gaul, more than thirty of them between 314 and 506. Under Merovingian rule, a number of "Frankish synods" were held, marking a particularly Germanic development in the Western Church: to the usual regional or provincial councils, Germanic peoples added a traditional element from their systems of government, the idea of a national council, which was influenced by the Christian East. They also indicate a growing congruence between church and state. While Arian rulers kept their distance from the general councils, Visigoth rulers began influencing the councils after the conversion of Reccared I. Merovingian kings (and the Carolingians after them) exerted their influence on the councils. According to Gregory Halfond, such congruence was a particular quality of the Gallo-Roman church, in which the Roman aristocracy made up an important part of its leadership and Roman procedures continued to be used.

An early important churchman is Caesarius of Arles, who organized regional synods mostly concerned with conforming the Church of Gaul to other Churches. At Orange, for instance, he had earlier Pelagian practices of the Gallic church anathematized, and at the ensuing council in Vaison liturgical conformity with other Churches was established. A model for the following Frankish synods was set by Clovis I, who organized the First Council of Orléans in 511, though he himself did not attend it. After the waning of Caesarius's influence and the establishment of Merovingian rule, the focus of the soon-to-be Frankish Church shifted north, to deal with the growing problem of adjusting to "deeply embedded Germanic practices". By the eighth century, the regular organization of synods had largely disappeared.

== See also ==
- Diocese of Gaul
- Praetorian prefecture of Gaul
