= Augustalis (bishop) =

Bishop of Toulon, writer of an Easter computus

Augustalis (fl. 441-442) was the first bishop of Toulon, according to some authorities. He was appointed in 441. He attended the Council of Orange that year, and the Council of Vaison the following. He is associated with the civitas of Arles (ancient Arelate) by the Martyrologium Hieronymianum, which honors him on September 7. He is also named by the Martyrologium romanum on that day, with his location noted as in Gallia. An Augustalis, most likely this man, appears among a group of bishops addressed by Pope Leo I in letters dated 22 August 449 and 5 May 450, the latter of which addresses issues of jurisdiction between Arles and Vienne.

== De ratione Paschae ==
See also Computus and Epact.

The bishop, or another churchman named Augustalis in Gaul of the 5th century (possibly the 3rd) was the author of a tract De ratione Paschae, a table or laterculus on calculating the Paschal cycle. He is referenced in the Carthaginian Computus of 455, preserved in an 8th-century chronographical manuscript in the cathedral library at Lucca.

The table itself is not extant and the description of it is insufficient for reconstruction. Augustalis reckoned that the Crucifixion took place on 25 March in the year 28, on the 14th day of the moon. The dating of the Passion to 28 agrees with that of Prosper Tiro. The base date of Augustalis's laterculus was the year 213. It covered a hundred years, ending in 312. Augustalis worked with, or is thought sometimes even to have originated, the 84-year Metonic cycle usually associated, like the date of March 25 for Easter, with the Celtic tradition of Christianity in Gaul and the Celtic Islands, including Hibernia (Ireland) and Britannia (Britain). This cycle is characterized by a 14th-year saltus lunae ("leap" of the moon), a day added to the epact to reconcile the lunar year to the solar (compare leap year).

Although the author of the Carthaginian Computus takes note of Augustalis as a man "of most sainted memory," he points out several errors in his computations.

The 19th-century German scholar Bruno Krusch placed Augustalis in the 3rd century and thought that the supputatio Romana, an 84-year Roman table, was derived from the table of Augustalis, which he further identified as the "old table" (vetus laterculus) referenced in a Paschal prologue in a manuscript at Cologne. The "old table" is more often assumed to be the 112-year table of Hippolytus. Eduard Schwartz criticized the views of Krusch, asserting that the table of Augustalis was never used in Rome and that it represented an "eccentric version" of the 84-year cycle used by the insular Celtic churches. He places Augustalis in the 5th century.

== See also ==
- Christianity in Gaul
- Easter controversy
- Quartodecimanism
