= Grace in Christianity =

Concept in Christianity

In Western Christian beliefs, grace is God's favor, and a "share in the divine life of God". It is a spontaneous gift from God – "generous, free and totally unexpected and undeserved" – that cannot be earned. In the Eastern Orthodox Church, grace is the uncreated energies of God. Among Eastern Christians generally, grace is considered to be the partaking of the divine nature described in 2 Peter 1:4 and grace is the working of God himself, not a created substance of any kind that can be treated like a commodity.

As an attribute of God, grace manifests most in the salvation of sinners, and Western Christianity holds that the initiative in the relationship of grace between God and an individual is always on the side of God.

The question of the means of grace has been called "the watershed that divides Catholicism from Protestantism, Calvinism from Arminianism, modern theological liberalism from theological conservatism". The Catholic Church holds that it is because of the action of Christ and the Holy Spirit in transforming into the divine life what is subjected to God's power that "the sacraments confer the grace they signify": "the power of Christ and his Spirit acts in and through [each sacrament], independently of the personal holiness of the minister. Nevertheless, the fruits of the sacraments also depend on the disposition of the one who receives them."

Catholics, Eastern Orthodox and Protestants agree that grace is a gift from God, as in Ephesians 2:8: "For by grace you have been saved through faith, and that not of yourselves; it is the gift of God." Lutherans hold that the means of grace are "the gospel in Word and sacraments." That the sacraments are means of grace is also the teaching of John Wesley, who described the Eucharist as "the grand channel whereby the grace of his Spirit was conveyed to the souls of all the children of God".

Calvinists emphasize "the utter helplessness of people apart from grace". But God reaches out with "first grace" or "prevenient grace". The Calvinist doctrine known as irresistible grace states that, since all persons are by nature spiritually dead, no one desires to accept this grace until God spiritually enlivens them by means of regeneration. God regenerates only individuals whom he has predestined to salvation. Arminians understand the grace of God as cooperating with one's free will in order to bring an individual to salvation. According to Evangelical theologian Charles C. Ryrie, modern liberal theology "gives an exaggerated place to the abilities of people to decide their own fate and to effect their own salvation entirely apart from God's grace".

== Old and New Testaments of the Christian Bible ==
Grace is the English translation of the Greek χάρις (charis) meaning "that which brings delight, joy, happiness, or good fortune."

=== Old Testament ===
The Septuagint translates as χάρις the Hebrew word חֵ֖ן (ẖen) as found in Genesis 6:8 to describe why God saved Noah from the flood. The Old Testament use of the word includes the concept that those showing favor do gracious deeds, or acts of grace, such as being kind to the poor and showing generosity. Descriptions of God's graciousness abound in the Torah/Pentateuch, for example in Deuteronomy 7:8 and Numbers 6:24–27. In the Psalms, examples of God's grace include teaching the Law (Psalm 119:29) and answering prayers (Psalm 27:7). Another example of God's grace appears in Psalm 85, a prayer for restoration, forgiveness, and the grace and mercy of God to bring about new life following the Babylonian Exile.

== Catholic Church ==
In the definition of the Catechism of the Catholic Church, "grace is favour, the free and undeserved help that God gives us to respond to his call to become children of God, adoptive sons, partakers of the divine nature and of eternal life". Grace is a participation in the life of God, which is poured unearned into human beings, whom it heals of sin and sanctifies.

The means by which God grants grace are many. They include the entirety of revealed truth, the sacraments and the hierarchical ministry, while in a Christian marriage, "husbands and wives are cooperators in grace and witnesses of faith for each other, their children, and all others in their household". Among the principal means of grace are the sacraments (especially the Eucharist), prayers and good works. The sacramentals also are means of grace. The sacraments themselves, not the persons who administer or those who receive them, are "the means of grace", although lack of the required dispositions on the part of the recipient will block the effectiveness of the sacrament.

The Catholic Church holds that "by grace alone, in faith in Christ's saving work and not because of any merit on our part, we are accepted by God and receive the Holy Spirit, who renews our hearts while equipping and calling us to good works." Both the Council of Orange (529) and the Council of Trent affirmed that we are "justified gratuitously, because none of the things that precede justification, whether faith or works, merit the grace of justification".

The Council of Trent declared that the free will of man, moved and excited by God, can by its consent co-operate with God, who excites and invites its action; and that it can thereby dispose and prepare itself to obtain the grace of justification. The will can resist grace if it chooses. It is not like a lifeless thing, which remains purely passive. Weakened and diminished by Adam's fall, free will is yet not destroyed in the race (Sess. VI, cap. i and v).

The joint declaration between Catholics and Lutherans on the doctrine of justification affirms:

We confess together that all persons depend completely on the saving grace of God for their salvation. Justification takes place solely by God's grace. When Catholics say that persons "cooperate" in preparing for and accepting justification by consenting to God's justifying action, they see such personal consent as itself an effect of grace, not as an action arising from innate human abilities.

— Pontifical Councils, The Vatican, Joint Declaration on the Doctrine of Justification

=== Sanctifying and actual grace ===
According to a commonly accepted categorization, made by St. Thomas Aquinas in his Summa Theologiae, grace can be given either to make the person receiving it pleasing to God (gratia gratum faciens) – so that the person is sanctified and justified – or else to help the receiver lead someone else to God (gratia gratis data). (Note: For example, in when a man is ordained a priest, the Church teaches that he receives the power to confect the Eucharist (to celebrate Mass) and to forgive sins in the Sacrament of Reconciliation. This power does not sanctify the priest per se, but rather the people who benefit from these Sacraments.) The former type of grace, gratia gratum faciens, in turn, can be described as sanctifying (or habitual) grace – when it refers to the divine life which, according to the Church, infuses a person's soul once they are justified; or else as actual grace – when it refers to those punctual (not habitual) helps that are directed to the production of sanctifying grace where it does not already exist, or its maintenance and increase it where it is already present. According to the Catechism of the Catholic Church:

Sanctifying grace is an habitual gift, a stable and supernatural disposition that perfects the soul itself to enable it to live with God, to act by his love. Habitual grace, the permanent disposition to live and act in keeping with God's call, is distinguished from actual graces which refer to God's interventions, whether at the beginning of conversion or in the course of the work of sanctification.

— Catechism of the Catholic Church

The infusion of sanctifying grace, says the Church, transforms a sinner into a holy child of God, and in this way a person participates in the Divine Sonship of Jesus Christ and receives the indwelling of the Holy Spirit. For this reason, sanctifying grace is also called deifying grace and sanctification is deification.

Sanctifying grace remains permanently in the soul as long as one does not reject one's adopted sonship by committing a mortal sin, which severs one's friendship with God. Less serious sins, venial sin, although they "allow charity to subsist, they offend and wound it." However, God is infinitely merciful, and sanctifying grace can always be restored to the penitent heart, normatively in the Sacrament of Reconciliation (or Sacrament of Penance).

=== Augustine versus Pelagius ===
In the early 5th century, Pelagius, an ascetic who is said to have come from Britain, was concerned about the moral laxity of society that he witnessed in Rome. He blamed this laxity on the theology of divine grace preached by Augustine of Hippo, among others. He strongly affirmed that humans had free will and were able to choose good as well as evil. Augustine, drawing on the exaggerated statements of the followers of Pelagius rather than on Pelagius' own writings, began a debate that was to have long-reaching effects on subsequent developments of the doctrine in Western Christianity. Pelagianism was repudiated by the Council of Carthage in 418, largely at Augustine's insistence. However, what Pelagius taught was likely what has come to be called semi-pelagianism.

In semi-Pelagian thought, both God and the human person always participate in the salvation process. Humans make free will choices, which are aided by God through creation, natural grace, "supernatural" grace, and God's restrictions on demonic influences. God continually brings the human person to real choices, which God also aids, in the process of spiritual growth and salvation. Semi-Pelagianism involves synergism, which is the traditional patristic doctrine. John Cassian, in continuity with patristic doctrine, taught that though grace is required for persons to save themselves at the beginning, there is no such thing as total depravity, but there remains a moral or noetic ability within humans that is unaffected by original sin, and that persons must work together (synergism) with divine grace to be saved. This position is held by the Eastern Orthodox Church and by many Reformed Protestants, and in the Catholic Church has been especially associated with the Society of Jesus.

=== Catholic versus Protestant ===
In 1547, the Council of Trent, which sought to address and condemn Protestant objections, aimed to purge the Roman Catholic Church of controversial movements and establish an orthodox Roman Catholic teaching on grace and justification, as distinguished from the Protestant teachings on those concepts. It taught that justification and sanctification are elements of the same process. The grace of justification is bestowed through the merit of Christ's passion, without any merits on the part of the person justified, who is enabled to cooperate only through the grace of God. The grace of justification may be lost through mortal sin, but can also be restored by the sacrament of Penance. The sacraments are, together with revealed truth, the principal means of the grace, a treasury of grace, that Christ has merited by his life and death and has given to the Church. This does not mean that other groups of Christians have no treasury of grace at their disposal, for, as the Second Vatican Council declared, "many elements of sanctification and of truth are found outside of (the Catholic Church's) visible structure".

=== Jansenists versus Jesuits ===
At about the same time that Calvinists and Arminians were debating the meaning of grace in Protestantism, in Catholicism a similar debate was taking place between the Jansenists and the Jesuits. Cornelius Jansen's 1640 work Augustinus sought to refocus Catholic theology on the themes of original sin, human depravity, the necessity of divine grace, and predestination, as he found them in the works of Augustine. The Jansenists, like the Puritans, believed themselves to be members of a gathered church called out of worldly society, and banded together in institutions like the Port-Royal convents seeking to lead lives of greater spiritual intensity. Blaise Pascal attacked what he called moral laxity in the casuistry of the Jesuits. Jansenist theology remained a minority party within Catholicism, and during the second half of the 17th and 18th centuries it was condemned as a heresy for its similarities to Calvinism, though its style remained influential in ascetic circles.

=== Grace and merit ===
Citing the Council of Trent, the Catechism of the Catholic Church states:

With regard to God, there is no strict right to any merit on the part of man. Between God and us there is an immeasurable inequality, for we have received everything from him, our Creator. The merit of man before God in the Christian life arises from the fact that God has freely chosen to associate man with the work of his grace. The fatherly action of God is first on his own initiative, and then follows man's free acting through his collaboration, so that the merit of good works is to be attributed in the first place to the grace of God, then to the faithful. Man's merit, moreover, itself is due to God, for his good actions proceed in Christ, from the predispositions and assistance given by the Holy Spirit. [...] The charity of Christ is the source in us of all our merits before God. Grace, by uniting us to Christ in active love, ensures the supernatural quality of our acts and consequently their merit before God and before men. The saints have always had a lively awareness that their merits were pure grace.

— Catechism of the Catholic Church

== Eastern Christianity ==
In the Eastern Orthodox Church, grace is identified with the uncreated Energies of God. Among Eastern Christians generally, grace is considered to be the partaking of the Divine Nature described in 2 Peter 1:4. The Holy Mysteries (Latin, "sacraments") are seen as a means of partaking of divine grace because God works through his Church, not just because specific legalistic rules are followed; and grace is the working of God himself, not a created substance of any kind that can be treated like a commodity.

Orthodox theologians reject Augustine's formulation of original sin and actively oppose the content and implications of John Calvin's conceptions of total depravity and irresistible grace, characteristic of Reformed Protestantism, as well as the Thomistic and scholastic theology which would become official Roman Catholic pedagogy until the Second Vatican Council. Eastern Christians typically view scholasticism and similarly discursive, systematic theologies as rationalistic corruptions of the theology of the Cappadocian and early Desert Fathers that led the Western Church astray into heresy. Orthodoxy teaches that it is possible and necessary for the human will to cooperate with divine grace for the individual to be saved, or healed from the disease of sin. This cooperation is called synergism (see also semipelagianism and monergism), so that humans may become deified in conformity to the divine likeness – a process called theosis – by merging with the uncreated Energies of God (revealed to the senses as the Tabor Light of transfiguration), notably through a method of prayer called hesychasm.

=== John Cassian ===
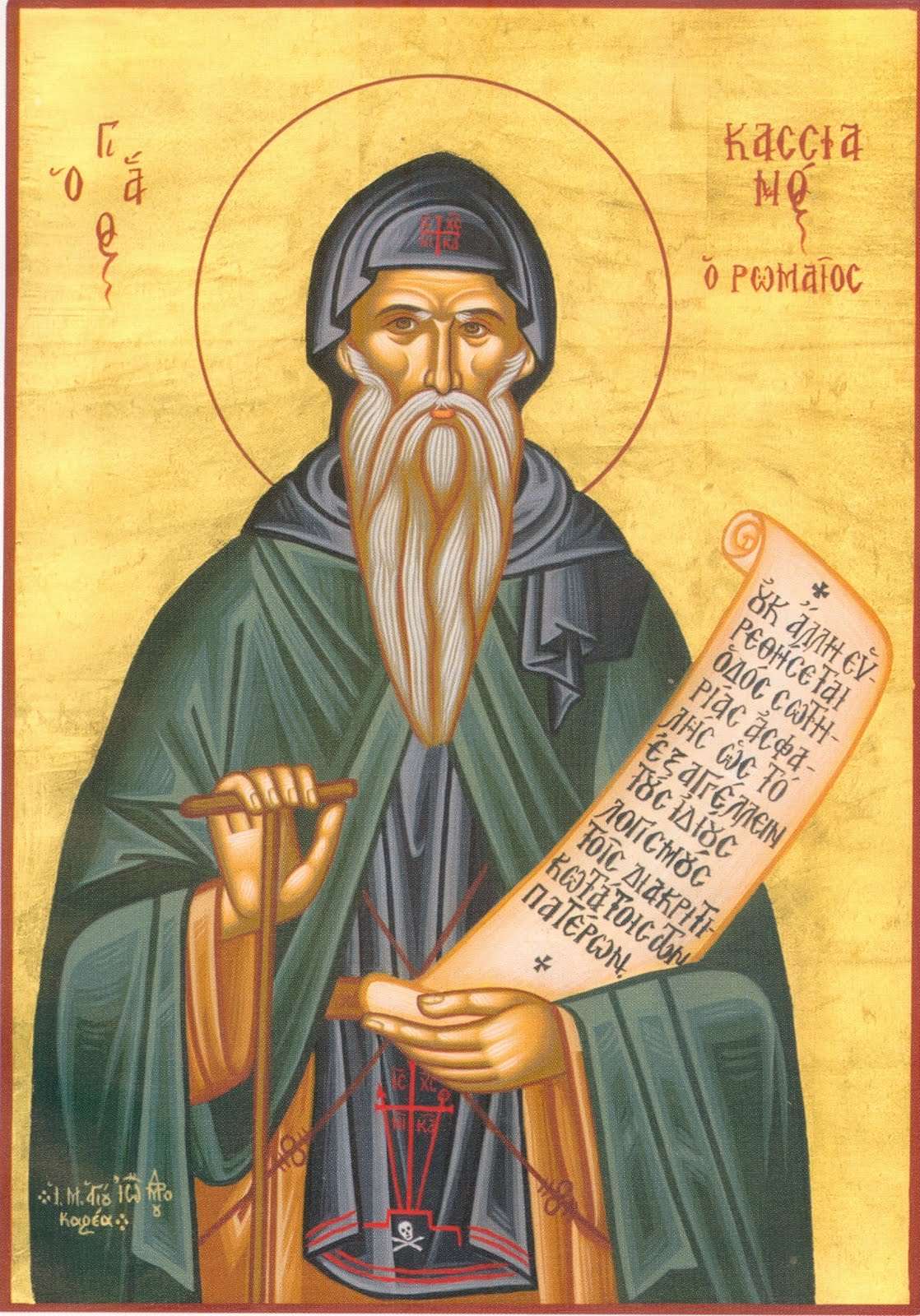
John Cassian (c. 360–435 AD), modern Greek icon.

In the works of John Cassian (c. 360–435 AD), Conference XIII recounts how the wise monk Chaeremon, of whom he is writing, responded to puzzlement caused by his own statement that "man even though he strive with all his might for a good result, yet cannot become master of what is good unless he has acquired it simply by the gift of Divine bounty and not by the efforts of his own toil" (Chapter 1). In Chapter 11, Cassian presents Chaeremon as speaking of the cases of "Paul the persecutor" and "Matthew the publican" as difficulties for those who say "the beginning of free will is in our own power", and the cases of Zaccheus and the good thief on the cross as difficulties for those who say "the beginning of our free will is always due to the inspiration of the grace of God". Chaeremon thus concludes; "These two then; viz., the grace of God and free will seem opposed to each other, but really are in harmony, and we gather from the system of goodness that we ought to have both alike, lest if we withdraw one of them from man, we may seem to have broken the rule of the Church's faith: for when God sees us inclined to will what is good, He meets, guides, and strengthens us: for 'At the voice of thy cry, as soon as He shall hear, He will answer thee'; and: 'Call upon Me', He says, 'in the day of tribulation and I will deliver thee, and thou shalt glorify Me'. And again, if He finds that we are unwilling or have grown cold, He stirs our hearts with salutary exhortations, by which a good will is either renewed or formed in us."

Cassian did not accept the idea of total depravity, on which Martin Luther was to insist. He taught that human nature is fallen or depraved, but not totally. Augustine Casiday states that, at the same time, Cassian "baldly asserts that God's grace, not human free will, is responsible for 'everything [that] pertains to salvation' – even faith". Cassian pointed out that people still have moral freedom and one has the option to choose to follow God. Colm Luibhéid says that, according to Cassian, there are cases where the soul makes the first little turn, but according to Casiday's interpretation, any sparks of goodwill that may exist, not directly caused by God, are totally inadequate and only direct divine intervention ensures spiritual progress; and Lauren Pristas says that "for Cassian, salvation is, from beginning to end, the effect of God's grace".

== Protestant Reformation ==
The Protestant Reformation reacted against the concepts of grace and merit as they were understood in late medieval Catholic theology.

=== Luther and Lutheran theology ===
Martin Luther's posting of his Ninety-five Theses to the church door in Wittenberg in 1517 was a direct consequence of the perfunctory sacramentalism and treasury doctrines of the medieval church. The act was precipitated by the arrival of Johann Tetzel, authorized by the Vatican to sell indulgences.

The effectiveness of these indulgences was predicated on the doctrine of the treasury of grace proclaimed by Pope Clement VI. The theory was that merit earned by acts of piety could augment the believer's store of sanctifying grace. Gifts to the Church were acts of piety. The Church, moreover, had a treasury full of grace above and beyond what was needed to get its faithful into heaven. The Church was willing to part with some of its surplus in exchange for earthly gold. Martin Luther's anger against this practice, which seemed to him to involve the purchase of salvation, began a swing of the pendulum back towards the Pauline vision of grace, as opposed to James's.

Luther taught that men were helpless and without a plea before God's justice, and their acts of piety were utterly inadequate before his infinite holiness. Were God only just, and not merciful, everyone would go to hell, because everyone, even the best of mankind, deserves to go to hell. Mankind's inability to achieve salvation by its own effort suggests that even the best intentions are somehow tainted by mankind's sinful nature. This doctrine is sometimes called total depravity, a term derived from Calvinism and its relatives.

It is by faith alone (sola fide) and by grace alone (sola gratia) that men are saved. Good works are something the believers should undertake out of gratitude towards their Savior; but they are not sufficient for salvation and cannot earn anyone salvation; there is no room for the notion of "merit" in Luther's doctrine of redemption. (There may, however, be degrees of reward for the redeemed in heaven.) Only the unearned, unmerited grace of God can save anyone. No one can have a claim of entitlement to God's grace, and it is only by his generosity that salvation is even possible.

As opposed to the treasury of grace from which believers can make withdrawals, in Lutheranism salvation becomes a declaration of spiritual bankruptcy, in which penitents acknowledge the inadequacy of their own resources and trust only in God to save them. Accepting Augustine's concern for legal justification as the base metaphor for salvation, the believers are not so much made righteous in Lutheranism as they are considered covered by Christ's righteousness. Acknowledging that they have no power to make themselves righteous, the penalty for their sins is discharged because Jesus has already paid for it with his blood. His righteousness is credited to those who believe in and thus belong to him.

=== Calvin and Reformed theology ===
Calvinist theology of salvation is characterized by divine monergism. It defines salvation as a process in which God alone is the author of every stage, working entirely through His grace and without any human participation. The French reformer John Calvin was profoundly influenced by Augustinian soteriology and systematized it further in his Institutes of the Christian Religion (1536).

The Calvinistic interpretation of predestination rests on theological determinism. It teaches that God has foreordained both those who will be saved and those who will be damned—a concept known as "double-predestination". In accordance with this view, Calvin affirmed the doctrine of perseverance of the saints, arguing for the unconditional preservation of the elect. This doctrine reflects a consistently monergistic understanding of salvation, viewing it as entirely dependent on the grace of God from beginning to end.

Within Reformed theology, two forms of divine grace are distinguished in relation to conversion—one extended universally, the other reserved for the elect. The first, common grace, denotes God's benevolent influence that restrains sin and bestows various temporal blessings upon all people. However, it neither overcomes humanity's total depravity nor possesses salvific intent. The second form of grace unfolds through two successive operations: effectual calling, by which God inwardly summons the elect, and irresistible grace, which regenerates and enables them to respond in faith.

=== Classical and Wesleyan Arminian theology ===
In the beginning of the 17th century, the Dutch theologian Jacobus Arminius formulated Arminianism and departed from Calvin's theology in particular on election and predestination. Arminianism affirms the compatibility between human free will and divine foreknowledge, and its incompatibility with theological determinism. Predestination in Arminianism is based on divine foreknowledge, unlike in Calvinism. Thus, the offer of salvation through grace does not act irresistibly in a purely cause-effect, deterministic method but rather in an influence-and-response fashion that can be both freely accepted and freely denied. In Arminianism, God takes initiative in the salvation process and his grace comes to all people. This is done through prevenient grace which acts on all people to convince them of the Gospel, draw them strongly towards salvation, and enable the possibility of sincere faith.

Later, John Wesley also rejected the Calvinist doctrine of predestination, and had the same Arminian understanding as expressed in Wesleyan theology. It remains the standard teaching of Methodist churches. Wesley also appealed to prevenient grace, stating that God makes the initial move in salvation, but human beings are free to respond or reject God's graceful initiative. The doctrine of prevenient grace remains one of Methodism's most important doctrines.

John Wesley distinguished three kinds of divine grace in the process of salvation: 1. "Prevenient grace" which is an enabling grace preceding regeneration ("prevenient" means preceding). 2. "Justifying grace" which can bring regeneration but which is resistible. 3. "Sustaining grace" which helps a person to remain into regeneration, and to reach sanctification and final salvation. In particular Wesley taught that Christian believers are to participate in the means of grace and to continue to grow in the Christian life, assisted by God's sustaining grace.

=== The Protestant Reformation and ecclesiology ===
Protestantism in all three major schools of theology – Lutheran, Calvinist, and Arminian – emphasize God's initiative in the work of salvation, which is achieved by grace alone through faith alone, in either stream of thinking – although these terms are understood differently, according to the differences in systems.

Classical Calvinism teaches that the sacraments are "signs and seals of the covenant of grace" and "effectual means of salvation", and Lutheranism teaches that new life, faith, and union with Christ are granted by the Holy Spirit working through the sacraments. However, for a large portion of the Protestant world, the sacraments largely lost the importance that Luther (and to a slightly lesser degree, Calvin) attributed to them. This happened under the influence of ideas of the Anabaptists which were ideas also seen in the Donatists in North Africa in 311 AD, and these ideas then spread to Calvinists through the Congregationalist and Baptist movements, and to Lutherans through Pietism (although much of Lutheranism recoiled against the Pietist movement after the mid-19th century).

Where the sacraments are de-emphasized, they become "ordinances", acts of worship which are required by Scripture, but whose effect is limited to the voluntary effect they have on the worshipper's soul. This belief finds expression in the Baptist and Anabaptist practice of believer's baptism, given not to infants as a mark of membership in a Christian community, but to adult believers after they have achieved the age of reason and have professed their faith. These ordinances are never considered works-righteousness. The ritual as interpreted in light of such ideas does not at all bring about salvation, nor does its performance bring about the forgiveness of sins; the forgiveness which the believer has received by faith is merely pictured, not effectively applied, by baptism; salvation and participation in Christ is memorialized ("this do in remembrance of me" in the Lord's Supper and baptism picturing a Christian's rebirth as death to sin and alive in Christ), not imparted, by the Eucharist. The Church to the Baptists becomes an assembly of true believers in Christ Jesus who gather together for worship and fellowship and remembering what Christ did for them.

== See also ==
- Prevenient grace
- Salvation (Christianity)
- Sacrament
- Charism
- Merit
