= Jean de Tulles =

Jean de Tulles may refer to:

- Jean de Tulles (died 1608), bishop of Orange
- Jean de Tulles (died 1640), bishop of Orange, nephew of the preceding
