= List of Frankish synods =

A list of church synods held in the Frankish kingdom and its immediate predecessors in the Frankish area, including the Visigothic Kingdom, the Ostrogothic Kingdom, and the Kingdom of Burgundy.

== Background and importance ==
Regional synods had been held regularly in the Church of Gaul, more than thirty of them between 314 and 506. The synods listed here (some of which are also referred to as "General synods of the German empire") mark a particularly Germanic development in the Western Church: to the usual regional or provincial councils, Germanic peoples added a traditional element from their systems of government, the idea of a national council, which was influenced by the Christian East.

They also indicate a growing congruence between church and state. While Arian rulers kept their distance from the general councils, Visigoth rulers began influencing the councils only after the conversion of Reccared I. As soon as they had established themselves, Merovingian kings (and the Carolingians after them) exerted their influence on the councils. According to Gregory Halfond, such congruence was a particular quality of the Gallo-Roman church, in which the Roman aristocracy made up an important part of the leadership of the Gallo-Roman (and later the Frankish) church; continuity in this power nexus is indicated also by the continued use of Roman procedures in the councils.

An early important churchman is Caesarius of Arles, who presided over the Visigoth synod held at Agde in 506, and then over the Second Council of Orange (529) and the Second council of Vaison (529). The synods organized by Caesarius were regional, and were mostly concerned with conforming the canons and practices of the Church of Gaul to those of other Churches. At Orange, for instance, he had earlier (Pelagian) practices of the Gallic church anathematized, and at the ensuing council in Vaison liturgical conformity with other Churches (Italy, Africa, the East) was established. A model for the following Frankish synods was set by Clovis I, who organized the First Council of Orléans (511); though he did not himself attend it, he set the agenda and followed the proceedings closely (at stake was "the unification of the Roman church under Frankish rule"). After the waning of Caesarius's influence and the establishment of Merovingian rule, the focus of the soon-to-be Frankish Church shifted north, to deal with the growing problem of adjusting to "deeply embedded Germanic practices"; rather than Pelagianism or Predestinatarianism, bishops now had to deal with problems involving "marriage, the relations between a warrior aristocracy and clergy, or monks and nuns, the conflicts born of royal influence and control, or of property rights".

The basic model established by Clovis entailed a meeting of church leaders (at any level) which could be convoked by religious or secular authorities. The result of such meetings were ecclesiastical legislative decisions called canones. Another aspect of synods was judicial: those who had transgressed ecclesiastical and other law were investigated and judged. Finally, synods decided on matters of grants and privileges.

Many of the synods (sometimes also called "councils"—"synod" is sometimes applied to smaller gatherings), though not all, have what can be called "conciliar status," that is, they were convoked by a monarchical authority. Especially in the Frankish church the great number of conciliar canons is evidence of the close relationship between the rulers and the church. By the eighth century, however, the regular organization of synods had largely disappeared, and when Boniface complained to Pope Zacharias in 742 that there hadn't been a synod in the Frankish church in at least eighty years, he was not exaggerating by much. Boniface's Concilium Germanicum was the first of three "reform councils" he organized in his attempts to reform the Frankish church. He was only partially successful in his attempts, and never really succeeded in disentangling the close relationship between nobility and clergy, which in many cases had led to church property being owned by noblemen (who had been appointed bishops by Carolingian rulers, for instance to appease them) and their families.

== Post-Roman synods held in Gaul before the Frankish period ==
=== Visigoth synods ===
- Synod of Agde (506)
- Synod of Marseilles (533)
- Council of Narbonne (589)

=== Ostrogoth synods ===
- Synod of Arles (506)
- Synod of Arles (524)
- Synod of Carpentras (527)
- Second Council of Orange (529)
- Second Council of Vaison (529)

=== Burgundian synods ===
- Council of Lyon (516) (c. 516)
- Council of Epaone (517), united the ecclesiastical provinces of Lyon and Vienne
- Council of Lyon (518/9)
- Second Council of Valence (ca. 528)

== Frankish synods ==
=== Sixth century ===
- First Council of Orléans (511)
- Second Council of Orléans (533)
- First Council of Clermont (Auvergne) (535)
- Third Council of Orléans (538)
- Fourth Council of Orléans (541)
- Second Council of Clermont (Auvergne) (549)
- Fifth Council of Orléans (549)
- Synod of Toul (550), presided over by Nicetius
- Synod of Paris (550)
- Synod of Metz (550/5)
- Synod of Éauze (551)
- Second Synod of Paris (551/2 / 556/73 / 567)
- Synod of Brittany (552)
- Synod of Arles (554)
- Second Council of Tours (567)
- Synod of Paris (573), by order of Guntram
- Synod of Paris (577), by order of Chilperic I
- Synod of Saintes (579)
- Synod of Mâcon (581/3)
- Council of Lyon (583)
- Third Council of Valence (583/5)
- Third Council of Clermont (Auvergne) (584/91)

=== Seventh century ===
- Council of Paris (614)
- Sixth Council of Orléans (621)
- Council of Clichy (626/7)
- Synod of Mâcon (627)
- Council of Clichy (636)
- Sixth Council of Orléans (639/41), convoked by Clovis II
- Council of Bourges (ca. 643), declared invalid by Sigebert III
- Synod of Chalon-sur-Saône (647/53)
- Synod of Arles (648/60)
- First Synod of Rouen (650), decided on simony and on liturgical and canonical matters
- Synod of Paris (653)
- Council of Clichy (654)
- Synod of Nantes (655/8)
- Synod of Bordeaux (662/75), convoked by Childeric II
- Synod of Autun (662/76)
- Synod of Saint-Jean-de-Losne (673/75), convoked by Childeric II
- Synod of Malay-le-Roi (677), convoked by Theuderic III
- Synod of Auxerre (695)

=== Eighth century ===
- Concilium Germanicum, presided over by Boniface (742/3)
- Council of Estinnes (1 March 744), Boniface's second reform council
- Council of Soissons (744) (3 March 744)
- Synod of Gentilly (767), sanctioned the traditional trinity (the matter of the Filioque) and veneration of images in the Western Church
- Council of Frankfurt (794)
- Council of Friuli (796)

=== Ninth century ===
- Council of Aachen (809)
- Synod of Worms (868)
- Synod of Tribur (895), presided over by Hatto I
