= Jean de Tulles (died 1640) =

French prelate

Jean de Tulles (died 3 October 1640) was a French prelate, bishop of Orange.

== Family ==
He was the nephew of his predecessor and namesake Jean de Tulles as bishop of Orange.

== Career ==
Jean de Tulles was appointed coadjutor to his uncle on 17 August 1605 and consecrated on 28 August as titular bishop of Troas. He was sent to Rome on state business by the Queen Regent Marie de' Medici, the mother of Louis XIII.

He succeeded his uncle as bishop of Orange in 1608. During his episcopacy he built a new episcopal palace, a hospital and also a convent for the Capuchin Poor Clares, at the request of Eleonora, wife of Philip William of Orange. In 1614 Pope Paul V issued a bull for the secularisation of the chapter of Orange Cathedral.

Jean de Tulles was appointed commendatory abbot of Longues Abbey and of Saignon Abbey.
