= Diocese of Orange =

Diocese of Orange may refer to:

- Roman Catholic Diocese of Orange in California
- Ancient Diocese of Orange, in France
