= Guillaume-Louis du Tillet =

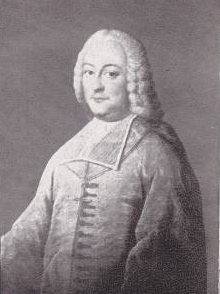
File:Louis Guillaum tillet.

Guillaume-Louis du Tillet (21 January 1730, Castle Montramé – 22 December 1794, Castle Blunay-lès-Melz) was a French prelate, last bishop of Orange, and clerical deputy to the States General in 1789.

== Early life ==
From an old family of magistrates, he was the son of Charles Claude, Marquis du Tillet, Vicomte de Malmaison, brigadier of the king's armies, and Margaret of Coeuret Nesle (whose sister married Charles Flahaut César La Billarderie and another Testu François de Balincourt). He is the uncle of Charles-Louis-Alphonse du Tillet.

Guillaume Louis studied humanities in Génovéfains of Provins, and theology at the Oratory of Saint-Magloire seminar in Paris, and then fired at the Sorbonne in 1754. Commendatory prior, he spent long periods in Tornac and, in these, distributed much revenue its priory poor, including both Catholics and Protestants in the region.

== Episcopal career ==
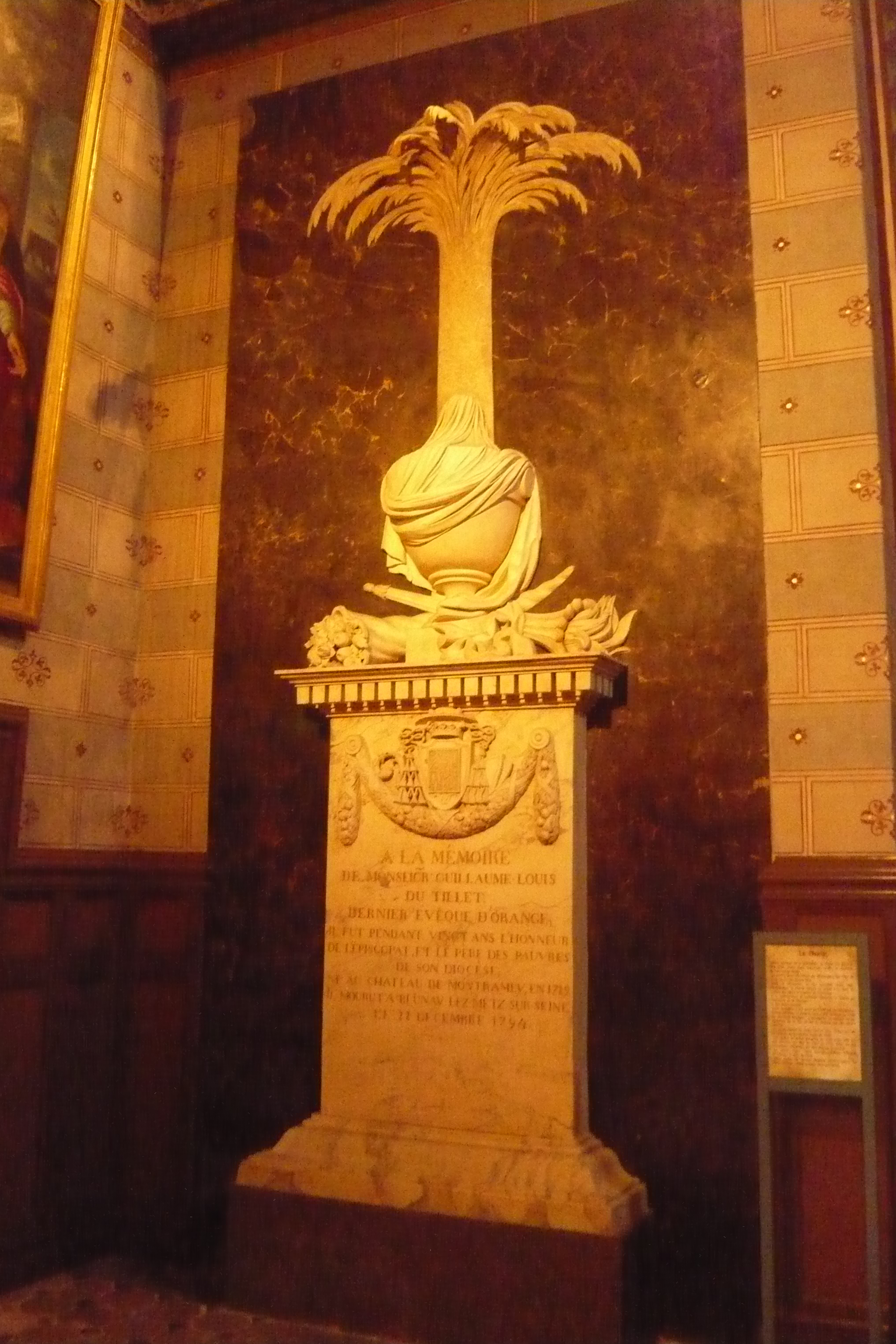
du Tillet's grave in Orange Cathedral.

Vicar general of the diocese of Châlons, dean of the collegiate church of Saint-Quiriace Provins in 1771, he was named bishop of Orange on 24 May 1774 it was the first bishop nominated by Louis XVI. Entirely devoted to his diocese and very charitable, he refused bishoprics of Le Mans and Grenoble.

Elected on 28 March 1789, member of the clergy to the States General by the principality of Orange, he showed himself very reserved and resigned on 29 October 1789 in favor of the abbot of Poulle, provost of the chapter . It cost him to leave his diocese, he had to retire to his in September 1790.

When he learned of the execution of Louis XVI, he collapsed and recited a De Profundis for the king's soul. He decided to not go to Switzerland, and was arrested on 9 October 1793 and imprisoned in Provins. Dozens of people signed a petition demanding the release of former bishop, but the mission representative was rejected. Transferred to Melun and Fontainebleau, reduced to Provins, he suffered from a rather serious ophthalmia, and asked to be taken to hospital or in his castle Blunay: he was released on 27 September 1794 and died two months later.

== See also ==
- Catholic Church in France
