= Grace for Grace =

2007 volume

- First edition
- Editor: Alexander Y. Hwang; Brian J. Matz; Augustine Casiday
- Language: English
- Genre: Non-fiction
- Publication date: 2007

Grace for Grace: The Debates After Augustine and Pelagius (2014) is a volume of conference proceedings from a 2007 conference examining issues related to the semi-Pelagian controversy. There are thirteen essays in the book, which was edited by Alexander Y. Hwang, Brian J. Matz and Augustine Casiday.
