= Louis Chomel =

Louis-Armand Chomel was an 18th-century Bishop of Orange, France.

He was born in 1688 and died on 25 May 1780 in Paris. He was the son of Jean Baptiste Chomel, first chamberlain of the Duke of Orleans.

Louis-Armand Chomel was named bishop of Orange in 1720, when plague broke out in Orange. In poor health, in 1731 he retired to Paris and resigned his diocese. He became the abbot at Chaumont Abbey from 1732.
