= Hyacinthe Serroni =

Italian Roman Catholic bishop and diplomat

Hyacinthe Serroni O.P.
- Archbishop of Albi
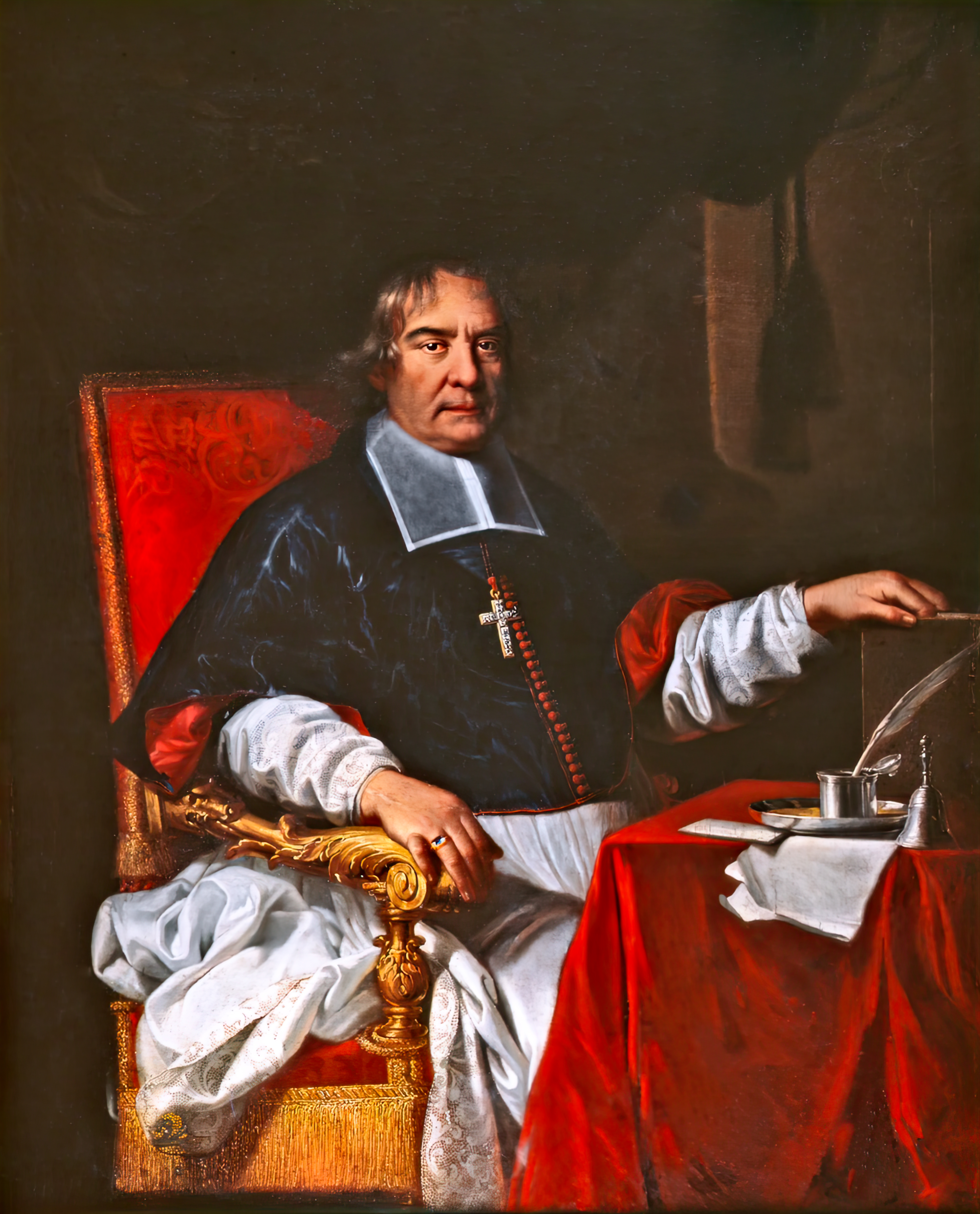
- Hyacinthe Serroni in 1685
- Church: Catholic Church
- Archdiocese: Archdiocese of Albi
- In office: 3 October 1678 – 7 January 1687
- Predecessor: Himself (as Bishop)
- Successor: Charles Le Goux de La Berchère
- Previous posts: Bishop of Albi (1676-1678); Bishop of Mende (1661-1676); Bishop of Orange (1647-1661)

Orders
- Consecration: 2 June 1647 by Mario Theodoli

Personal details
- Born: 30 August 1617 Rome, Papal States
- Died: 7 January 1687 (aged 69) Paris, Kingdom of France

Hyacinthe Serroni (August 30, 1617, Rome – January 7, 1687 Paris) was an Italian Roman Catholic bishop, diplomat, and steward of the Navy for the kingdom of France.

== Career ==
Sent by Pope Urban VIII, he arrived in France in 1645, where he earned a doctor of theology. From 1646 he became bishop of Orange, but latter returned to Rome. He returned to France in 1648 and became apostolic vicar of the ecclesiastical province of Tarragona. After five years in the service of the bishop, the King appointed him superintendent of the navy and the province of Provence, and latter Catalonia until the truce between France and Spain. In 1660, he was appointed with Pierre de Marca, Archbishop of Toulouse, to participate in the Conference of Ceret which was to set the boundaries between France and Spain, but which separated without concluding. On 12 November 1660 he signed the Treaty of Llívia as representative of Louis XIV, which are discussed in detail the thirty-three villages of Cerdagne who had to belong to France under the Treaty of the Pyrenees.

In 1661 he was appointed bishop of Mende by the King. So he left Orange. Then, in 1676, he obtained the bishopric of Albi. In 1676, the diocese was elevated to an archdiocese. Hyacinthe Serroni thus became the first archbishop of Albi, remaining so until his death in 1687. From 1679 he convened a synod which gathered all the clergy of his diocese. His Ordinances synodales were published in the same year. To ensure the quality of his local clergy, Serroni established a seminary, in 1679, in a house on Bout-du-Pont in Albi. The management was entrusted to the Jesuits.

== His writings ==
- Méditations et affections sur les sept pseaumes de la Pénitence, pour l'usage des nouveaux convertis, 1686
- Entretiens affectifs de l'âme avec Dieu sur les cent cinquante psaumes, 1688.

== Representation in art ==
A portrait of the new archbishop of Albi was painted in 1685 by Hyacinthe Rigaud, recently arrived in Paris, for 330 livres ( "the Archbishop of Alby (Hyacinthe Seronis)".

The original painting is now in the Toulouse-Lautrec Museum in Albi, It formed the basis for an engraving by Frans Ertinger (Schwaben, 1640 - Paris, 1710) (Inv. 149).
