= Domitian of Huy =

Gaulish bishop

Saint Domitian of Huy
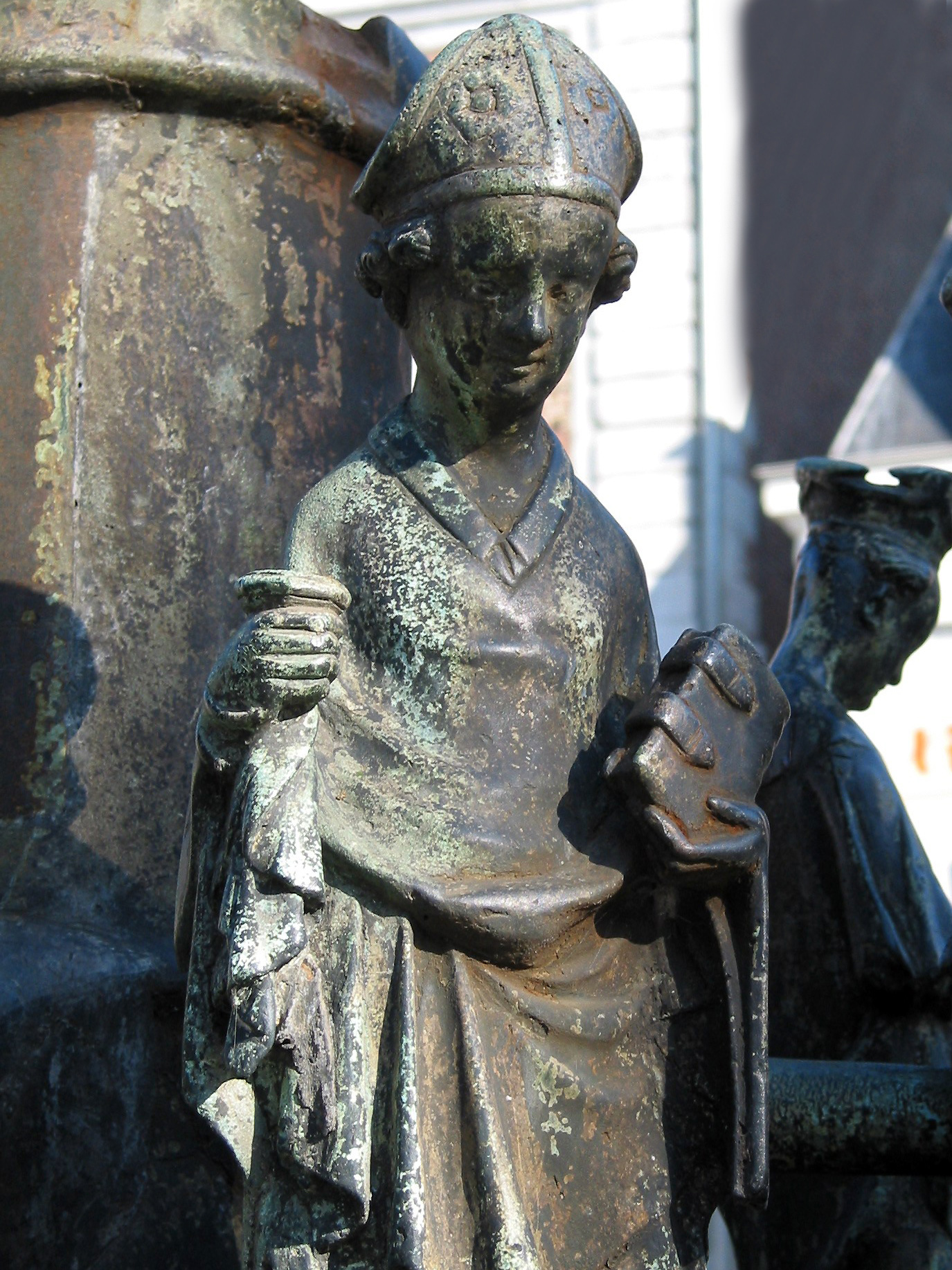

Bishop of Tongeren
- Born: 6th century somewhere within the Kingdom of the Franks
- Died: 7 May 560
- Venerated in: Eastern Orthodox Church; Roman Catholic Church
- Feast: 7 May
- Patronage: fever; Huy, Belgium

Domitian of Huy (Latin: Domitianus; also, of Maastricht) was a Gaulish bishop of the sixth century who is noted for both his generosity and writings against heresy. He is venerated as a saint.

== Life ==
Domitian was chosen bishop of Tongeren, but later moved his seat to Maastricht. He was present at the Council of Clermont (535). Domitian is notable for speaking out convincingly against heretics, especially at the Fifth Council of Orléans in 549.

He encouraged the development of polemic against heresy in the early church, and worked to evangelize the Meuse Valley. He is occasionally referred to as the "Apostle of the Meuse Valley" for his efforts there.

Domitian also constructed churches and hospices in order to care for people spiritually and physically. He was well known for his generosity, as well as his ability to procure money via fund-raising, a talent that once helped to ease a famine in his bishopric.

== Veneration ==
Domitian's relics are kept and venerated at the Church of Notre-Dame in Huy, Belgium, the city of which he is now the patron saint. He is remembered in a procession to a local spring. He is invoked against fevers.

According to tradition, he delivered the area from a dragon that had contaminated the water supply. He is sometimes depicted with a dragon at his feet.

== Sources ==
- Rabenstein, Katherine (August 1999). "Domitian of Huy". Saint of the Day, May 7: Domitian of Huy. Archived from the original on February 6, 2007.
