= Synod of Marseilles =

The Synod of Marseilles was a Christian provincial council held in Marseille on 25 May 533.

== Attendees ==
Bishops attending the synod included:

- Cyprian, bishop of Toulon
- Pretextatus, bishop of Apt
- Eucherius, bishop of Avignon
- Prosper, bishop of Vence
- Herculius, bishop of Saint-Paul-Trois-Châteaux
- Rusticus, possibly bishop of Aire
- Pontadius, unknown diocese
- Maximus, bishop of Aix
- Porcianus, bishop of Digne
- Aletius, bishop of Vaison
- Vindemialis, bishop of Orange
- Rodanius, unknown diocese
- Auxanius, unknown diocese

An abbot, Valentius, attended on behalf of Fylagrio, bishop of Cavaillon. Caesarius, the bishop of Arles, convoked and presided over the council.

== Topics ==
Caesarius convoked the council to investigate Contumeliosus, the bishop of Riez. After testimony from witnesses, Contumeliosus confessed to both "sins of the flesh" and theft of church property, and was sentenced to confinement in a monastery and financial restitution. In its decision, the council cited precedent from previous ecumenical councils, and quoted John Chrysostom and Cyprian of Carthage. The council's decision was passed on to Pope John II, who removed Contumeliosus from his office.

Hermann Knust, a German academic, found records of the council in the Darmstadt Library in the nineteenth century.
