= Longues-sur-Mer =

- Commune
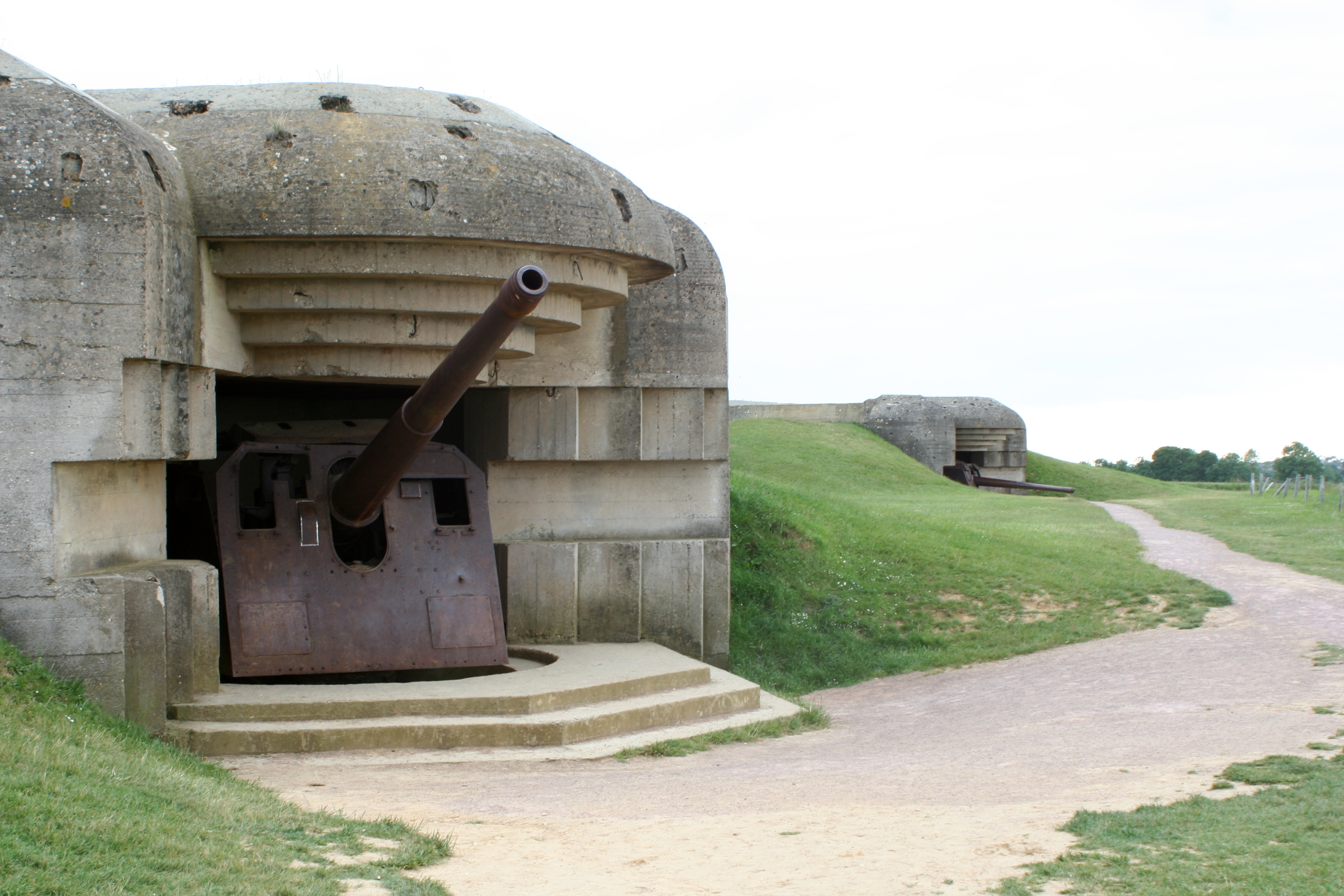
- Two bunkers of the Longues-sur-Mer battery

- Coat of arms
- Location of Longues-sur-Mer
- Location within France Location within Normandy
- Coordinates: 49°20′12″N 0°41′39″W
- Country: France
- Region: Normandy
- Department: Calvados
- Arrondissement: Bayeux
- Canton: Bayeux
- Intercommunality: CC Bayeux Intercom

Government
  - Mayor (2020–2026): Roland Tirard
- Area^{1}: 12.29 km^{2} (4.75 sq mi)
- Elevation: 76 m (249 ft)
- Highest elevation: 77 m (253 ft)
- Lowest elevation: 0 m (0 ft)
- Population (2023): 585
  - Density: 47.6/km^{2} (123/sq mi)
- Time zone: UTC+01:00 (CET)
  - Summer (DST): UTC+02:00 (CEST)
- INSEE/Postal code: 14377 /14400
- ^{1} French Land Register data, which excludes lakes, ponds, glaciers > 1 km^{2} (0.386 sq mi or 247 acres) and river estuaries.

Longues-sur-Mer (French pronunciation: [lɔ̃ɡ syʁ mɛʁ]) is a commune in the Calvados department in Normandie region in northwestern France.

The Longues-sur-Mer battery is nearby, part of the Atlantic Wall coastal fortifications.

== Population ==
Historical population
Year	Pop.	±% p.a.
1968	469	—
1975	447	−0.68%
1982	463	+0.50%
1990	561	+2.43%
1999	586	+0.49%
2007	688	+2.03%
2012	635	−1.59%
2017	606	−0.93%
2023	585	−0.59%
Source: INSEE

== See also ==
- Communes of the Calvados department
- Longues Abbey
