= Council of Clermont (535) =

Frankish synod

The Council of Clermont (Concilium Arvernense), held on 8 November 535, was one of the earliest Frankish synods. It took place at Arvernum (the later Clermont, conquered by Clovis I in 507), and was attended by fifteen prelates of the kingdom of Austrasia under the presidency of Honoratus, bishop of Bourges.

Among those bishops attending were Gallus, bishop of Clermont, Gramatius, Bishop of Windisch, Flav(i)us of Reims, Lupus of Châlons-sur-Marne, Domitianus, Bishop of Tongeren (seated in Maastricht: ecclesiae Tongrorum, quod et Traiecto), Hesperius of Metz, Desideratus of Verdun, and Nicetius of Trier. Frankish bishops tended to consult records of previous legislation and were aware that their own rulings would be recorded for future reference.

Seventeen canons were drawn up at the council, of which the first sixteen are contained in the Decretum Gratiani (compiled in the 12th century by Gratian); they have become part of the corpus of canon law of the Catholic Church, the Corpus Iuris Canonici.

In summary, the canons prohibit bishops from submitting to the deliberations of councils any private or temporal affairs, before having dealt with matters regarding discipline; clerics are forbidden to appeal to saeculars in their disputes with bishops; excommunication is pronounced against bishops who solicit the protection of princes in order to obtain the episcopacy, or who cause forged decrees of election to be signed. The council also declared that Jews may not hold the office of magistrate, and spoke against marriages between relatives, and the misconduct of the clergy. The twelfth canon prohibited married clergy. Deacons and priests who continued to have conjugal relations with their wives were to be deprived of their office.

Two further Frankish synods were held in Clermont (Arvernum), one in 549, and the other at an uncertain date towards the end of the 6th century (584/591).

== Sources ==
- Brian Brennan, 1985. "'Episcopae': Bishops' Wives Viewed in Sixth-Century Gaul" Church History 54.3 (September 1985), pp 311–323.
- Hefele, Karl Joseph von. A History of the Councils of the Church, from the Original Documents. Volume 4. Edinburgh: T.&T. Clark 1895. Pp. 190-192.
