= First Council of Orléans =

511 Frankish synod

Coordinates: 47°54′11″N 1°54′38″E

The First Council of Orléans was a synod convoked by Clovis I, King of the Franks, in 511. Clovis called for this synod four years after his victory over the Visigoths under Alaric II at the Battle of Vouillé in 507. The council was attended by thirty-two bishops, including four metropolitans, from across Gaul, and together they passed thirty-one decrees. The bishops met at Orléans to reform the church and build a strong relationship between the crown and the Catholic episcopate, the majority of the canons reflecting a compromise between these two institutions.

The 511 Council of Orléans was the first national Merovingian church council. It was an important milestone in creating a unified Gallic Church under Frankish rule, and accordingly the matters addressed at the council reflected the concerns of the Catholic episcopate in this new political context. The council established a Merovingian conciliar tradition, being the first of "no less than forty-five provincial and national Church councils" in the sixth century (see List of Frankish synods).

== Attendees ==
Attending Bishops

Although Clovis convoked the council, he was not present in Orléans when the bishops met. Of the thirty-three attending bishops, approximately two-thirds were from northern Gaul and the remaining third from the south. The provinces represented at Orléans were Bordeaux, Bourges, Éauze, Tours, Rouen, Sens, and Rheims. However, it was Cyprian of Bordeaux, a southern bishop, who presided over the council. Halfond proposes that Clovis chose Cyprian as president in acknowledgement of the ‘long-established spiritual and pastoral authority’ of the southern bishops, and their association with conciliar tradition.

Halfond further argues that Clovis purposely elected to represent cities recently integrated into his kingdom, including newly appointed northern bishops and the Aquitanian bishops previously under Visigothic rule. Halfond refers to the council’s episcopal subscriptions to support this. The bishops are listed in order of seniority, so the subscriptions show that many of the northern bishops were the most recently appointed.

== Location ==
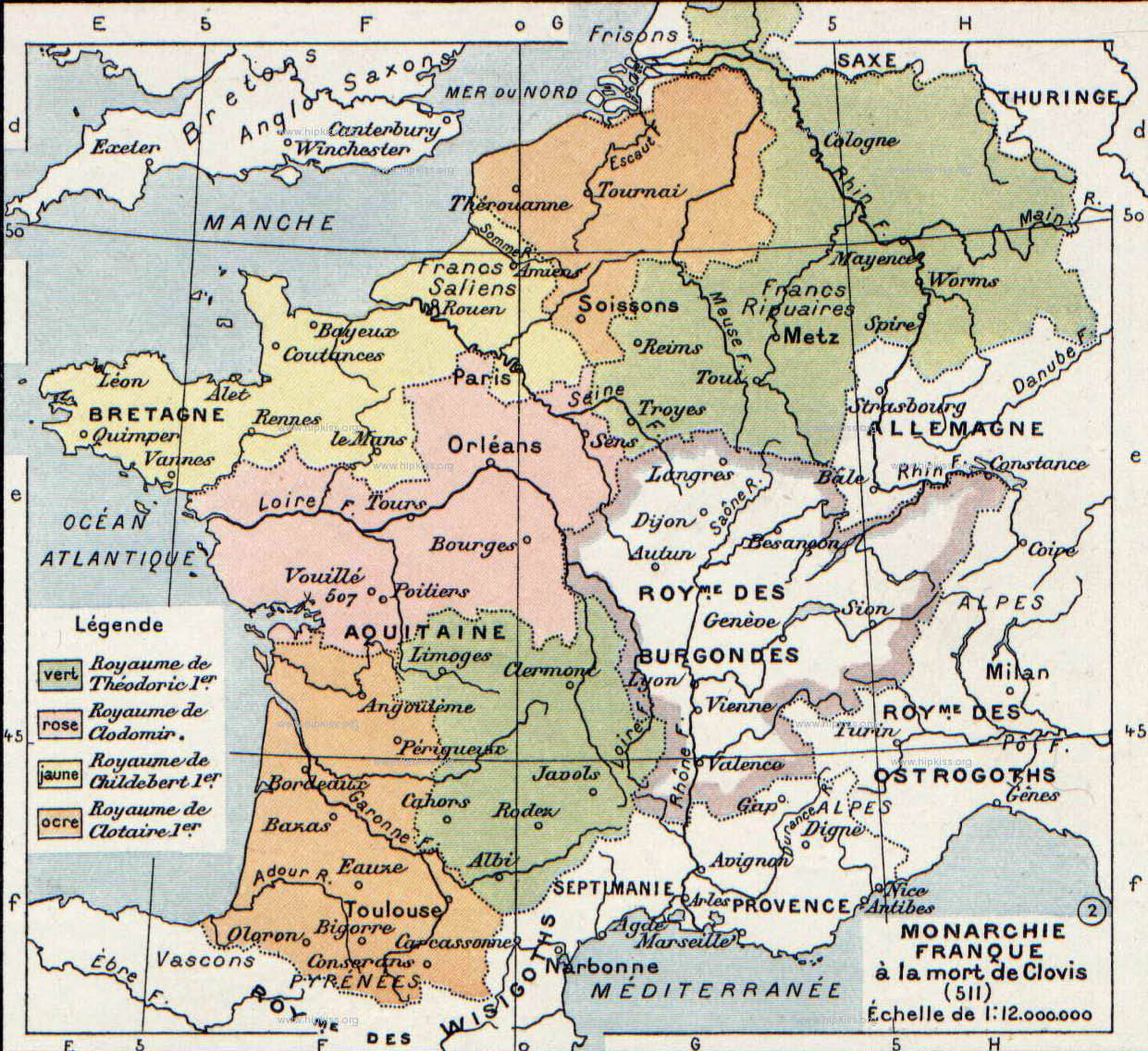
Map of Frankish Gaul in 511, showing the location of Orléans.

For the location of his synod, Clovis chose the civitas of Orléans, located in north-central Gaul, on the Loire River. Its central location allowed for accessibility, and its status as a frontier city between Clovis’ kingdom and the newly conquered Visigothic territory gave the location significance.

In 511 Orléans had no significance in Gallic conciliar affairs, but over the Merovingian period was to become a prominent meeting place for national church councils. Four further councils took place in Orléans in the sixth century.

== Clovis and the context of Vouillé ==
=== Clovis' involvement in the council ===
Clovis was not present at the council, but the attending bishops wrote a letter to him following the council to inform him of the proceedings and seek his approval. The letter references ‘all the bishops’ that Clovis ordered to be present, indicating that Clovis controlled attendance.

Further, the letter references ‘headings’ that Clovis gave the bishops to discuss, indicating that Clovis had some influence on the proceedings of the council. Clovis’ convocation of the council was partially an act of imitatio imperii following in the Constantinian tradition, Constantine having called the First Council of Nicaea in 325.

=== Precedent of Agde ===
However, there was also the more immediate precedent of the Council of Agde, convoked by Alaric in 506. Although Alaric was an Arian, he had assembled Roman bishops together. Clovis, as a Nicene Christian, was aware of this and thus the need to call a Frankish synod. Agde and Orléans shared both attendees and legislative concerns. Halfond has argued that issues from Agde were raised at Orléans with the specific aim of addressing concerns of the Aquitanian bishops who were new to Frankish rule.

=== Context of Vouillé and the Visigothic defeat ===
Clovis convened the First Council of Orléans shortly before his death in 511, in the context of his recent defeat of the Visigoths in 507 at the Battle of Vouillé. Alaric II’s territory in Aquitaine was thus taken over by Clovis. This created the practical issue of integrating the Visigothic episcopate.

There has been historiographical debate over the impact the Visigothic defeat had on Clovis’ convocation of the council. Daly has argued against the importance of the Visigothic wars, arguing that the council did not have an ‘Aquitanian focus’. Wallace-Hadrill questions the importance of Vouillé, considering that the council did not occur until four years after the Visigothic defeat. However, he contends that the primary purpose of the council was to deal with property of the Aquitanian churches following the Frankish conquest. Historical consensus attributes some degree of significance to the Visigothic context, Halfond and James both proposing that the council was focused on the regulation of episcopal affairs in light of the expanded Frankish territory.

== Creed ==
The thirty-one decrees of the First Council of Orléans addressed ecclesiastical and royal concerns, although their respective concerns often intersected. The first ten canons, but specifically 4-7, are likely an answer to the royal questionnaire. The council was particularly focused upon episcopal authority, while it also regulated clerical and monastic life, concerning issues of property, crime, and relations with women. It covered some liturgical issues concerning mass, feasts, and fasting. Penitents and the laity were only briefly discussed. Canon 32 "expressly decreed the perpetuity of servitude among the descendants of slaves."

Some of the most pertinent issues that arose were:

=== Sanctuary ===
The opening canons cover matters of sanctuary in church. The canons cover a range of scenarios, namely concerning criminals (c.1), abductors (c.2), and slaves (c.3). In the case of ‘murderers, adulterers, and thieves’ seeking sanctuary in the church, the bishops ruled that the ecclesiastical canons and Roman law should be followed, meaning ‘it should not be permitted’ to remove them from the church, nor hand them over unless an oath is sworn promising no harm.

=== Clerical immunity ===
Canon five addresses ‘offerings or lands’ which the King has gifted to the Church. Historians have argued this could reflect the context of distributing Visigothic land and property. It is decreed that royal gifts were to be immune from taxation, but were to be directed into church maintenance, supporting the bishops, and aiding the poor and prisoners through alms.

=== Converted clerics ===
Canon ten addresses ‘heretical clerics’, specifically dealing with Arian clerics following the Frankish gain of Visigothic territory. It is decreed that if these clerics ‘entirely accept’ Catholicism, they are permitted to join the ranks of the Catholic clergy in whatever role their bishop decides appropriate.

=== Episcopal authority ===
A number of the canons are constructed to determine the boundaries of a bishop’s authority. Notably, the authority of a bishop over their clergy is asserted (c.7, c.28). The canons also address episcopal control over church offerings and the bishop’s duty to distribute among the ‘poor or sick’ (c.14-16). It is decreed that abbots are to be ‘under the control of bishops’ and are to be punished by the bishops if they oppose their Rule (c.19).

Within this, the boundaries of secular and episcopal authority are discussed, as per Clovis’ agenda. It is decreed that laymen are not to be ordained, unless commanded so by the king or with the consent of the judge (c.4).

== Significance ==
As the First Council of Orléans was the first national Merovingian church council, it acted as a model for future Frankish councils. Its canons had longevity, as nearly all of them were preserved in Merovingian and Carolingian canonical compilations.

The First Council of Orléans established a precedent for Frankish kings’ involvement in ecclesiastical councils. Clovis established a standard for ‘associating royal power with the enforcement of conciliar decisions’. From Orléans, a tradition of ‘mutual recognition’ developed between crown and church, wherein both recognised the importance of the other in managing ecclesiastical affairs.
