= Ancient Diocese of Orange =

Former Roman Catholic diocese in France

Coordinates: 44.14°N 4.81°E

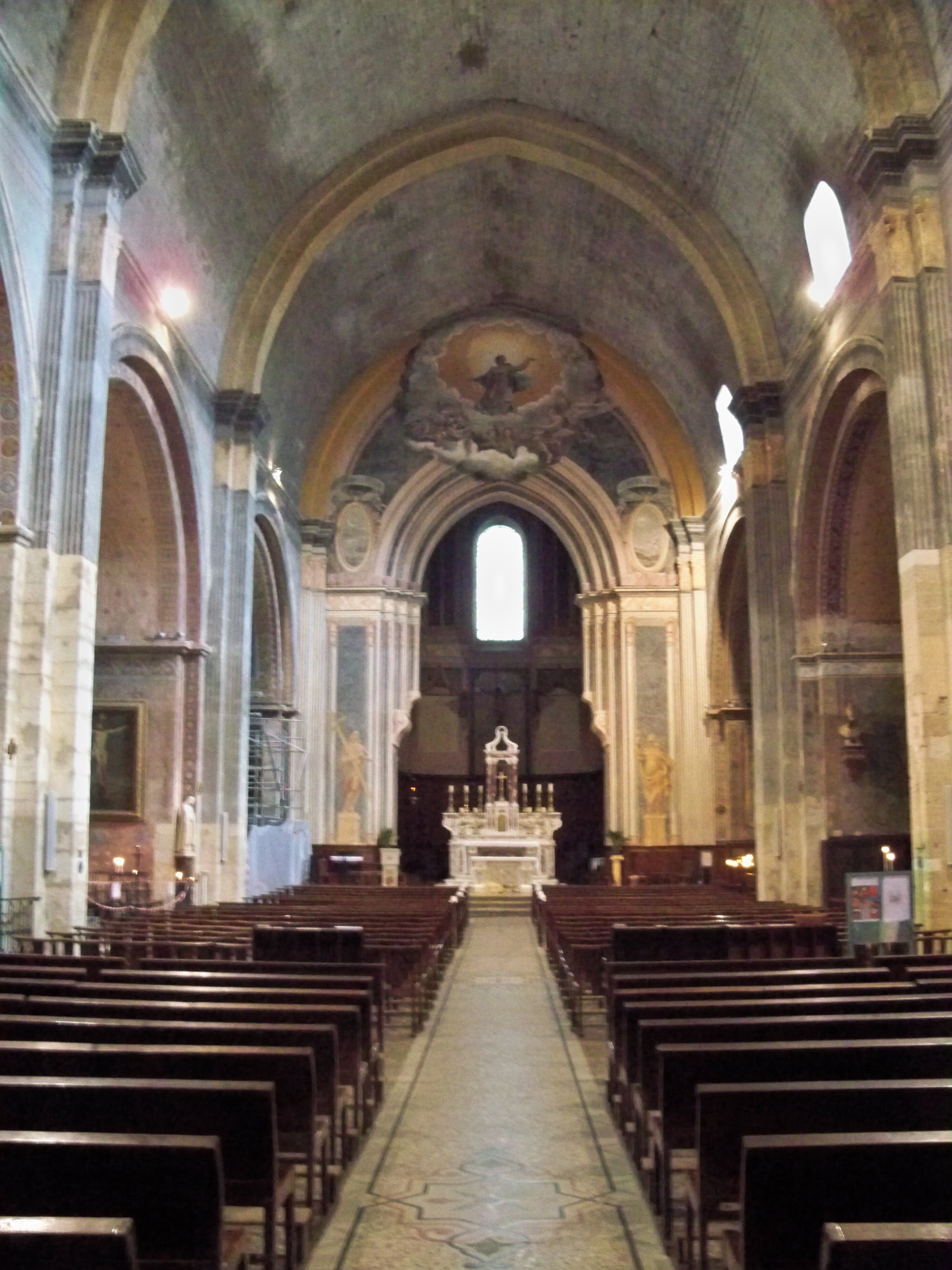
Interior of Orange Cathedral

The ancient residential diocese of Orange in the Comtat Venaissin in Provence, a fief belonging to the papacy, was suppressed by the French government during the French Revolution. It was revived in 2009 as a titular see of the Catholic Church.

== History ==
The city now called Orange in southern France was called Arausio in Roman times. It had been founded as a retirement colony for veterans of the Roman Army who had served under Augustus during his campaigns against Marc Antony. It became the seat of a bishop very probably towards the end of the 3rd century: at the Synod of Arles in 314, its bishop was represented by a priest named Faustinus. The first bishop of Arausio whose name is given in extant documents was Constantius, who took part in the Council of Aquileia, 381. From the early 5th century, the see was a suffragan of the metropolitan see of Arles.

Arausio hosted two important synods, in 441 and 529. The Second Council of Orange was of importance for its condemnation of what later came to be called Semipelagianism.

In 1516 Francis I of France ordered the union of the principality of Orange and the Dauphiné, the accomplishment of which was ordered by the Parliament of Grenoble in March 1517. This union made the Bishop of Orange subject as far as his temporal rights were concerned to the king of France. On 8 August 1520, King Francis granted Bishop Guillaume Pélissier an extra six months to make his submission to the Chambre des comptes of the Dauphiné.

In accordance with the Concordat of 1801, Pope Pius VII attached the territory of the diocese to the archdiocese of Avignon by the papal bull Qui Christi Domini of 29 November 1801. In 1817, after the fall of the Emperor Bonaparte and the return of the Bourbon monarchy, it was planned to restore the residential status of the bishopric in accordance with a new concordat, but the French parliament refused to ratify the concordat.

The ancient see of Arausio, therefore, is no longer a residential bishopric. In January 2009 Pope Benedict XVI revived the title for use as a titular see, for auxiliary bishops of other dioceses and for curial bureaucrats to whom episcopal status is granted. The title currently (since 27 January 2012) belongs to Archbishop Julio Murat, Apostolic Nuncio to Cameroon and to Equatorial Guinea since 2018.

== Bishops ==
=== To 1000 ===
A list of names of bishops before 347 was invented by Polycarpe de la Rivière but is unsupported by any evidence.

- Faustinus in 314 attended the Council of Arles as a cleric accompanying the unnamed bishop of Orange, the first recorded bishop of Orange.
- ? Aristonus, 347
- ? Eradius, c. 356
- Constantius 381
- Marin, 433
- Justus, c. 440-c.455
- Eutropius of Orange, c. 455-475
- Verus
- Florentius of Orange, 517-524
- Vindemialis, 527-549
- Matthieu, 555
- Trapecius, 584
- Salicus, 788-798
- Damasus, c. 804
- Boniface, c. 820-839
- Laudon, c. 840
- Pons I, c. 852
- Gérard I, 855-c. 862
- Boniface II*, 860
- Oldaricus*, 866
- Gérard II, 879
- Bonnaricus I, 899
- Ebroinus, 910
- Pontius (Pons) II, 914
- Bonnaricus II*, 930
- Salitoneus*, 940
- Ingelbertus*, 952
- Richard*, 968
- Segaldus*, 980
- Bertrand*, 994
- Aldebrand I*, 1005
- Berniconius*, 1020
- Aldebrand II*, 1026
- Pons III*, 1032

The last ten bishops of the 10th and 11th centuries are completely unattested.

=== 1000 to 1300 ===
- Odalric c.1040
- Martin 1058
- Geraldus de Asteri (Géraud) c.1060
- Guillaume I c.1080-1098
- Bérenger 1107-1127
- Gérard 1128-1129
- Guillaume II 1130-1138
- Guillaume III 1139-1140
- Bernard 1141-c.1170
- Pierre I 1173
- Hugues Florent c.1180
- Arnoul 1182 - after 1204
- Guillaume Elie after 1204-1221
- Amicus 1222-c.1240
- Pierre II c.1240-1271
- Josselin 1272-c.1278
- Guillaume D'Espinouse 1281-1321

=== 1300 to 1500 ===
- Rostaing I 1322-1324
- Hugues 1324-1328
- Pierre III 1329-1342
- Guillaume VII 1343-1348
- Jean de Revol 1349-1350
- Guillaume VIII 1350-1351
- François de Caritat 1373-1387
- Pierre Didaci 1389-1413
- Pierre D'Ailly 1413-1417 (Administrator) (resigned)
- Georges de Grano 1418-1420
- Guillaume IX 1420-1428 (transferred to Cassano in s. Italy)
- Guillaume X 1429-v.1447
- Bertrand III 1438-v.1442
- Antoine Ferrier v.1444-1450
- Jean Payer 1454-1466
- Guyot Adhémar 1466-1468
- Jean Gobert 1468-1476
- Pierre de Surville 1476-1480
- Laurent Alleman 1481-1483
- Pierre Carré, O.P. 1483-1510

=== 1500 to 1790 ===
- Guillaume Pélissier 1510-1527
- Louis Pélissier 1527-1542
- Rostaing de La Baume de Suze, O.Cist. 1543-1560
- Philippe de La Chambre de Maurienne, O.S.B. 1560-1572 (resigned)
- Jean de Tulles I 1572-1608
- Jean de Tulles II 1608-1640
- Jean Vincent de Tulles 1640-1647 (transferred to Lavaure)
- Hyacinthe Serroni 1647-1661 (transferred to Mende)
- Alexandre Fabri 1661-1674
- Jean-Jacques D`Obheil 1677-1720
- Louis Chomel 1720-1731
- François-André de Tilly 1731-1774
- Guillaume-Louis du Tillet 1774-1790, last bishop

== See also ==
- Catholic Church in France
- List of Catholic dioceses in France

== Bibliography ==
=== Reference works ===
- Gams, Pius Bonifatius (1873). Series episcoporum Ecclesiae catholicae: quotquot innotuerunt a beato Petro apostolo. Ratisbon: Typis et Sumptibus Georgii Josephi Manz. pp. 591–592. (Use with caution; obsolete)
- Eubel, Conradus, ed. (1913). Hierarchia catholica, Tomus 1 (second ed.). Münster: Libreria Regensbergiana. (in Latin) p. 117-118.
- Eubel, Conradus, ed. (1914). Hierarchia catholica, Tomus 2 (second ed.). Münster: Libreria Regensbergiana. (in Latin) p. 119.
- Eubel, Conradus; Gulik, Guilelmus (1923). Hierarchia catholica, Tomus 3 (second ed.). Münster: Libreria Regensbergiana. p. 123.
- Gauchat, Patritius (Patrice) (1935). Hierarchia catholica IV (1592-1667). Münster: Libraria Regensbergiana. p. 102.
- Ritzler, Remigius; Sefrin, Pirminus (1952). Hierarchia catholica medii et recentis aevi V (1667-1730). Patavii: Messagero di S. Antonio. p. 106.
- Ritzler, Remigius; Sefrin, Pirminus (1958). Hierarchia catholica medii et recentis aevi VI (1730-1799). Patavii: Messagero di S. Antonio. p. 107.
- Sainte-Marthe, Denis de (1715). Gallia christiana, in provincias ecclesiasticas distributa (in Latin). Vol. Tomus primus. Paris: Coignard. pp. 763–792.

=== Studies ===
- Albanés, Joseph Hyacinthe; Fillet, Louis (1916). Gallia christiana novissima: Orange (Évêques, prévots) (in Latin). Montbéliard: Société anonyme d'imprimerie montbéliardaise.
- Bastet, Joseph-Antoine (1837). Essai historique sur les évêques du Diocèse d'Orange mêlé de documents historiques et chronologiques sur la ville d'Orange et ses princes (in French). Orange: J. Escoffier.
- Duchesne, Louis (1907). Fastes épiscopaux de l'ancienne Gaule: I. Provinces du Sud-Est. Paris: Fontemoing. second edition (in French)
- Woods, F. H., ed. (1882). Canons of the Second Council of Orange, A.D. 529 (in English and Latin). Oxford: James Thornton.
