= Synod of Gentilly =

The Synod of Gentilly (Latin: Concilsum Gentiliacense) was a Christian Frankish Synod held on Christmas day in 767 AD. There are no surviving acts of the council. The synod was located at Gentilly, Val-de-Marne in modern-day France.

== Attendance ==
Most of the bishops of Gaul and Germany were present as well as 6 papal legates, 6 ambassadors from the Byzantine emperor Constantine V, several Greek bishops and Pepin the Short with many of his nobles.

== Topics ==
The question of the procession of the Holy Ghost was discussed at the council, specifically regarding the use of the Filioque inside the Nicene Creed. This caused controversy among the ambassadors of the Byzantine emperor. It is unknown whether it was the Franks or the Greeks that broached the issue concerning the Filioque but it is more likely that the Franks introduced the issue as it was unlikely for Byzantine iconoclasts to have brought up another topic to sway Pepin from their cause. There was also a discussion on the veneration of images. The synod sanctioned the use of images during worship, which implies a condemnation of the iconoclastic policies of the Byzantine emperor and refusal to enter diplomatic and political negotiations with the east.

== See also ==
- Iconoclast controversy
- Filioque
- History of the filioque controversy
- List of Frankish synods
