= François-André de Tilly =

French prelate and Bishop

François-André Roussel de Tilly, from Moulins, who died in 1775, was a French prelate of the 18th century and Bishop of Orange, France.

He was an abbot of Mazan Abbey, St. Eusebius Apt and Abbey Mauleon. He was appointed Bishop of Orange in 1731 by Louis XV. In 1760 he removed to the Abbey of Notre-Dame du Puy Orange and meets at the Abbey of St. Croix Apt. In May 1774 he resigned from his diocese and died on 30 July 1775 in Saint-André-de-Ramières near Gigondas. He was the second-last bishop of the diocese.
