= Gal I (bishop of Clermont) =

Gal I of Clermont

Bishop of Clermont
- Born: c. 489; Clermont-Ferrand, France
- Died: 554; Clermont-Ferrand, France
- Venerated in: Eastern Orthodox Church; Roman Catholic Church
- Feast: 1 July (Eastern Orthodox); 3 July (Roman Catholic)

Saint Gal of Clermont (also Gall) (c. 489 – 554) was the sixteenth Bishop of Clermont, holding that see from 527 to 551. He shares a name with a later bishop of the diocese, who, though less illustrious than the first Gal, is also revered as a saint. Gal played an important role in the politics of the Church, as the Council of Clermont (535) was hosted under his episcopate. He was the uncle and teacher of Gregory of Tours.

== Life ==
Gal was the scion of a senatorial family, born in Clermont, Auvergne circa 489. His mother was descended from the family of Vettius Apagatus, a revered martyr from Lyon. While his parents proposed to have him married to a daughter of a respectable senator, Gal had other plans, and privately withdrew to a monastery at Cournon. Once he received the consent of his parents, he joyfully embraced a life of religious poverty. Gal's intelligence and piety caused his recommendation as councilor to Quintianus, the bishop of Clermont, who ordained him a priest.

Theuderic I, the king of Austrasia, invaded Auvergne and took Gal prisoner, attaching him to the oratory in the palace. Gal regained his liberty after a few years and returned to Clermont.

When Quintianus died in 527, Gal was chosen as the successor to the Bishopric of Clermont. During his tenure as bishop, he embellished the tomb of Saint Amabilis at the collegiate church in Riom.

Gal was distinguished for his gentleness and charity. It was during this time that Gal's extraordinary equanimity was most tested: one story reports that the bishop was "struck on the head by a brutal man, [yet] he discovered not the least emotion of anger or resentment, and by this meekness disarmed the savage of his rage." A similar anecdote involves a man named Evodius, a priest who had once been a senator. Although the proud man acted insultingly to Gal, the bishop's reaction was simply to rise from his seat and make a visit to the churches of the city. Touched by Gal's patience, Evodius cast himself at the feet of the bishop in the middle of the street.

Gal played a major political and religious role as Bishop of Clermont. He became known as a defender of the rights of the Church against Sivigald, the governor appointed by Theuderic. The chief event of his episcopate was the Council of Clermont in 535. He also took part in the Fourth (541) and Fifth (549) Councils of Orléans.

Gal died in the year 553. His feast day in the Roman Catholic Church is 3 July; in the Eastern Orthodox Church it is 1 July.
