= Jean Vincent de Tulles =

French bishop

Jean-Vincent de Tulle, died in December 1668 in Paris, was a French prelate of the 17th century.

== Family ==
He is the nephew of his predecessor, John II of Tulle and the grandnephew of John I. Tulle, also a Bishop of Orange. Jean-Vincent de Tulle is the son of Peter Lord of Hertel and Lucretius Lascaris.

== Career ==
He was educated partly in Paris in the 1630s. He was commendatory abbot of St. Eusebius of Apt and was co-opted as coadjutor of his uncle. On 16 March 1637 he was appointed titular bishop of Dioclea in Phrygia and enshrined as such in Rome on 13 April. He was made bishop of Orange on 3 October 1640.

He was a fearless defender of the rights of the Catholic Church while being a supporter of Mazarin. Under his episcopate he worked for consolidation of powers in the seat of Orange in the Church of France. On 27 May 1647, he was appointed to the diocese of Lavaur.
