= Vindemialis =

French bishop

Vindemialis was Bishop of Orange from 527 to 549.

He attended, and probably hosted, the famous second Council of Orange on July 3, 529, that was chaired by Saint Caesarius of Arles. He also attended the Synod of Marseilles in 533.
