= Concilium Germanicum =

The Concilium Germanicum was the first major Church synod to be held in the eastern parts of the Frankish kingdoms. It was called by Carloman on 21 April 742/743 at an unknown location, and presided over by Boniface, who was solidified in his position as leader of the Austrasian church. German historian Gunther Wolf judges that the Concilium was the high point in Boniface's long career.

== Background ==
Much of the documentation pertaining to the Concilium relies on Boniface and documents associated with his life, and while the saint was prone to rhetorical embellishment and exaggeration in his correspondence, his assessment of the situation in the Frankish church appears to be reliable, although in some details he was off by a few years—the last synod in the Frankish church appears to have been held in 695 in Auxerre. He outlines three main problems in a letter written early in 742 to the newly elected Pope Zachary:

- Church regulations (esp. in regard to property) had been disregarded for six decades or more;
- There had been no church synods for at least eighty years;
- There were no archbishops in the Frankish church, and bishops (many without a fixed see) and priests were only interested in the material benefits of the office, stealing church property and living worldly lifestyles, which included living with concubines, drinking, and hunting.

Boniface had begun his reform attempts of the Frankish church in the 730s, and by the 740s had found a kindred spirit in Carloman, the more religiously oriented of Charles Martel's two sons who divided their father's domain. When Carloman promised Boniface a synod, he saw an opportunity to address two of his main interests in his reform efforts: to protect church property from a rapacious gentry, and to impose stricter guidelines on the clergy.

== Decisions and outcome ==
Participation in the Concilium was restricted to Boniface's supporters, and among those invited were the bishops of Carloman's Austrasia. As well as Boniface (who, as archbishop, presided over the synod) the bishops of Cologne, Strasbourg, and Büraburg were present, as was a chorbishop named Willibald and a bishop named Dadan (who was possibly from Erfurt or an auxiliary bishop from Utrecht). Absent were the bishops from Utrecht, Metz, Verdun, Speyer, and Liège. Boniface's main opponents, Milo, bishop of Reims, and Gewilip, bishop of Mainz, failed to appear.

Strengthened by the absence of his enemies, Boniface succeeded in having stricter guidelines adopted, but the effort to re-appropriate church property was thwarted by bishops and nobility alike.

The measures adopted at the Concilium included:

- Archbishops and bishops with a fixed see were to be appointed to replace the noble laypersons who had received dioceses under Charles Martel;
- Bishops were required to visit their parishes, with the aid of auxiliary bishops;
- Clergy were required to appear annually before the bishop to give a reckoning of their personal and official activities;
- On Maundy Thursday, bishops were to consecrate oil (chrism) during a special mass, with which all the parishes in their diocese were to be supplied;
- Clergy were not allowed to carry weapons, and were forbidden to hunt;
- The Rule of Saint Benedict became mandatory for all monasteries.

Many of the Concilium's measures were geared toward a stricter organization of the Frankish church, and to enforce such organization annual synods were called for, as well as real bishops and archbishops and the enforcement of canon law.

Church historian Matthias Schuler, commenting on Boniface's failure to have church property returned to the church, proposes that the time was not yet ripe for Carloman to re-appropriate those properties, which had often been handed (by way of church offices) to various noblemen by his father, Charles Martel, to appease them and strengthen their loyalty. Re-appropriation would have led to widespread anger and distaste for the reform movement. A (partial) redress of the situation was decided on in the next of Boniface's Frankish synods, that of Estinnes, 1 March 743. Whereas Gunther Wolf judged that the Concilium was the high point in Boniface's long career, other scholars such as Matthias Schuler place that high point in 747, Boniface's Frankish synod.

== Date ==
There is still some contention among scholars about the date. Theodor Schieffer (in his 1954 biography of the saint) maintained 743, pace Heinz Löwe, as do Kurt-Ulrich Jäschke and Alain Dierkens. It is still being discussed, but 742 is maintained most notably by Heinz Löwe, and this date was most recently given by Michael Glatthaar and Michael E. Moore.

== See also ==
- List of Frankish synods
