= Cyprian of Toulon =

Saint Cyprian of Toulon
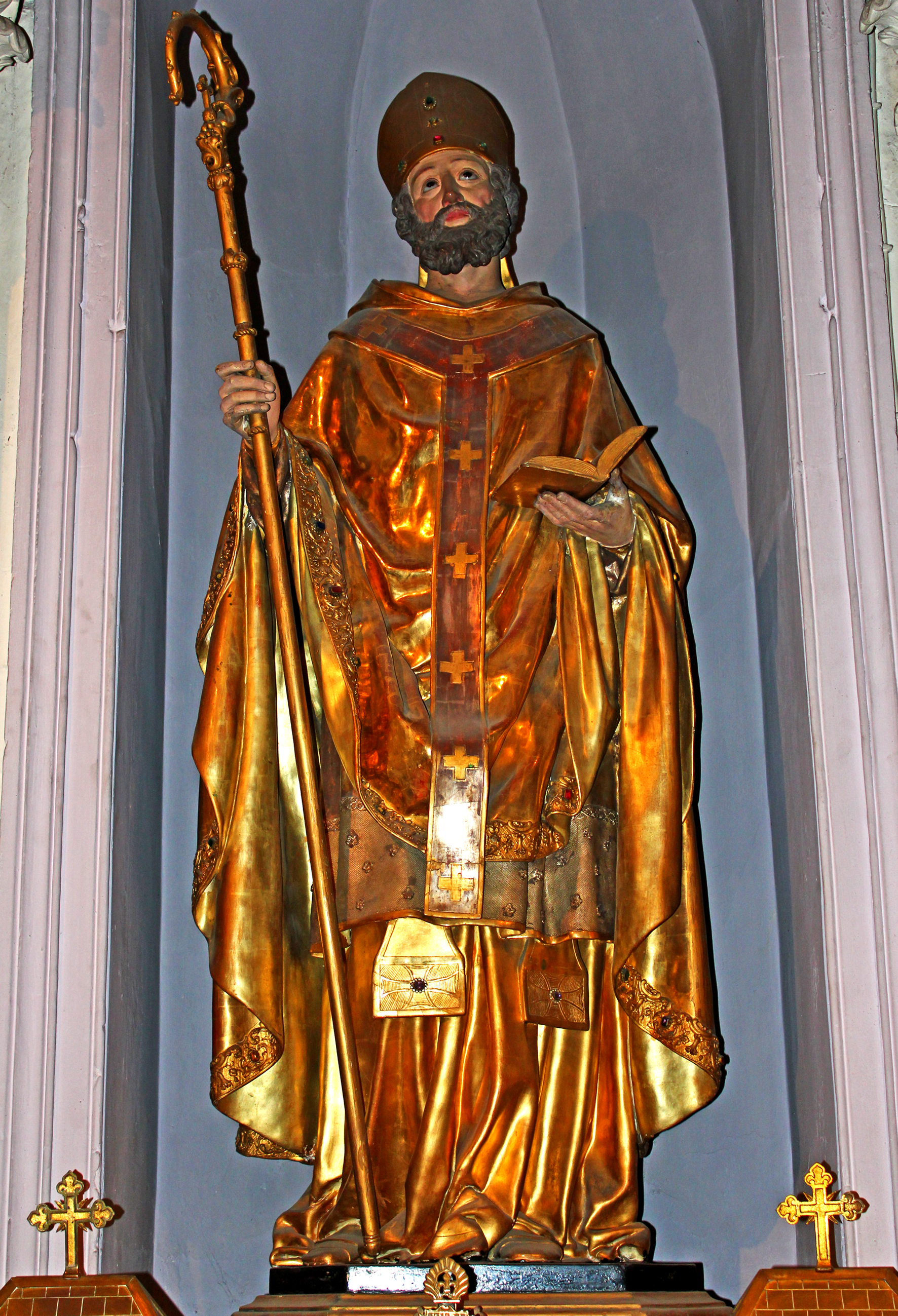
- Born: 476 AD; Marseille
- Died: October 3, 546 AD
- Venerated in: Roman Catholic Church
- Feast: October 3

Saint Cyprian of Toulon (Cyprianus Tolonensis; 476 – October 3, 546) was bishop of Toulon during the 6th century.

== Life ==
Born at Marseille, he was the favorite pupil of St. Caesarius of Arles by whom he was trained. Caesarius ordained him in 506 to the diaconate, and, in 516, consecrated him as bishop of Toulon.

St. Cyprian appears to have been present in 524 at the synod of Arles and in the following years to have attended a number of councils, including the Council of Marseilles. At all these assemblies he showed himself a vigorous opponent of Semipelagianism.

He said to have converted to Catholicism two Visigoth chiefs, Mandrier and Flavian, who became anchorites and martyrs on the peninsula of Mandrier.

Soon after the death of Caesarius (d. 543) Cyprian wrote a life of his great teacher in two books, being moved to the undertaking by the entreaty of the Abbess Caesaria the Younger, who had been the head of the convent at Arles since 529. The life is one of the most valuable biographical remains of the sixth century. Cyprian was aided in his task by the two bishops, Firminus and Viventius, friends of Caesarius, as well as by the priest Messianus and the deacon Stephen. The main part of the work up to the fortieth chapter of the first book was most probably written by Cyprian himself.

In 1892 the Monumenta Germaniae Historica series published another writing of his, a letter to the Bishop St Maximus of Geneva, which discusses some of the disputed theological questions of that age.

The biography was edited by d'Achery and Mabillon in the Acta Sanctorum Ord. S. Benedicti, Venice 1733, vol. i. p. 636ff, also in the Bollandists' Acta Sanctorum under date of Aug. 27). A modern English translation is W.E. Klingshirn, Caesarius of Arles: Life, Testament, Letters. Translated Texts for Historians, 19 (Liverpool, 1994).

The feast of St. Cyprian falls on October 3.
