= Philippe de La Chambre de Maurienne =

Philippe de La Chambre de Maurienne (died 1572) was a French prelate of the 16th century.

== Family ==
He was the son of Count John of the House [of Maurienne] (died before 1545), Viscount de Maurienne, who married in 1499 to Barbe d'Amboise, niece of Cardinal Amboise. He had a cousin Philip (1490-1550) who was a Cardinal (1533) and Bishop of Belley (1538).

== Biography ==
He was prior of Contamines.

Philippe was made bishop of Orange by the Pope in 1560. But as he was appointed by the Pope before the Prince of Orange William named him, he was deprived by that prince revenues of his bishopric, until 1562. The Episcopal city was battered by the Huguenots, during the reformation wars so he retired to Avignon. Philip withdrew quickly to Caderousse with his canons and clergy because of turmoil spawned by Protestants. The vault and the bell tower of the Cathedral were destroyed, as were 7 churches. Following the "rampage" the Huguenots transformed the city for some time to be Protestant. Philippe finally resigned his bishopric 1572.
