= Jean de Tulles (died 1608) =

French Catholic bishop

Jean de Tulles (died 5 August 1608) was a French prelate, latterly bishop of Orange.

== Life ==
Jean de Tulles was born in Avignon into the family of the lords of Villefranche.

He was chamberlain of the University of Avignon and abbot of the Abbey of Saint-Eusèbe, Saignon, near Apt. He was appointed bishop of Orange on 16 June 1572. As bishop he took steps to strengthen and re-establish Catholic doctrine and was used by Pope Sixtus V and King Henry III in religious affairs. In 1597 Roman Catholicism was restored in Orange.

He was also governor of the Comtat Venaissin and rector of the city of Carpentras.

Towards the end of his episcopate, on 17 August 1605, he appointed his nephew and namesake Jean de Tulles as co-adjudicator, who succeeded him as bishop after his death in 1608 in Caderousse.
