= Longues Abbey =

Abbey in Calvados, France

Coordinates: 49.3325°N 0.6980°W

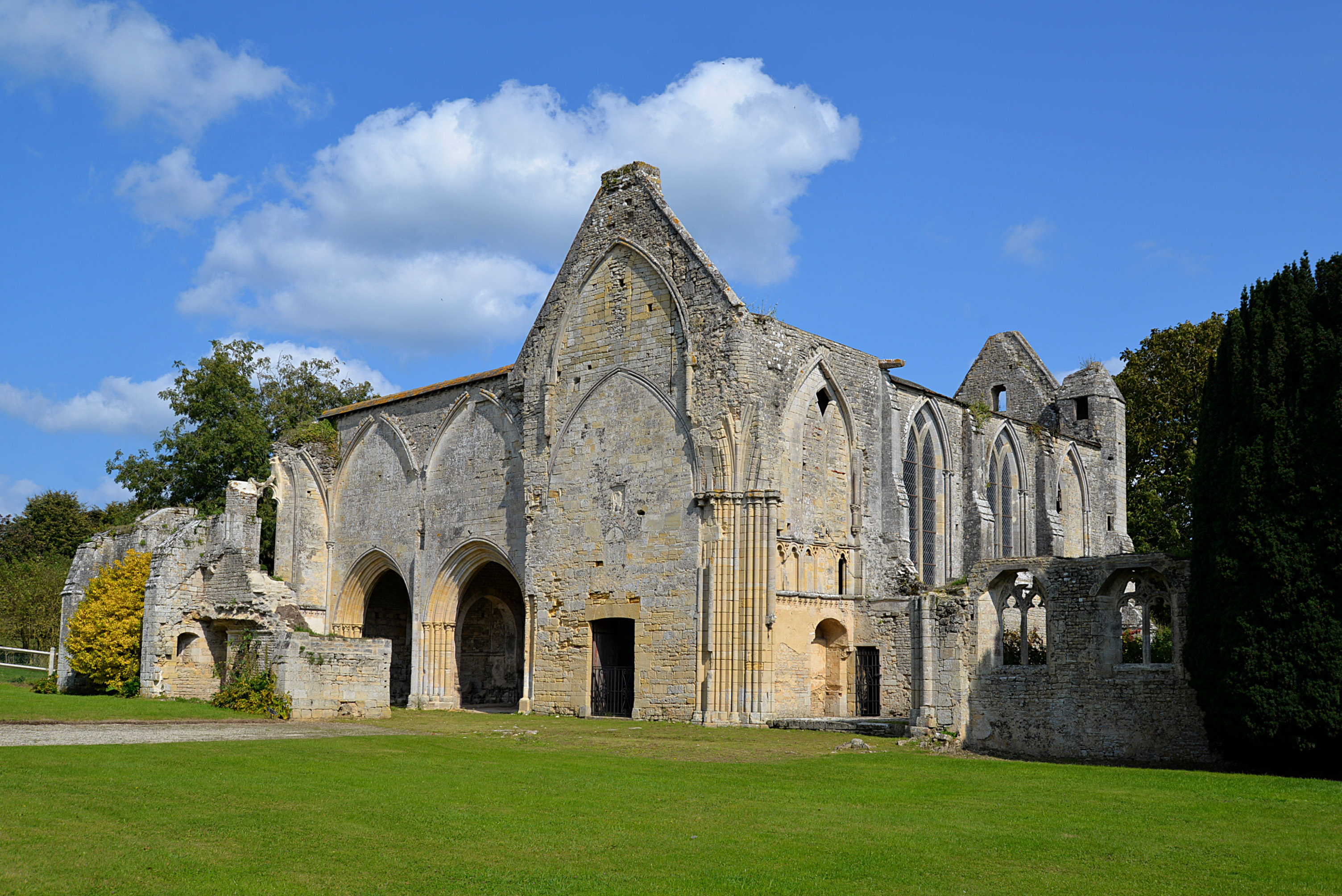
Ruins of the abbey church

Longues Abbey (French: Abbaye de Longues, Abbaye Sainte-Marie de Longues) is a former Benedictine monastery in Longues-sur-Mer, Calvados, Normandy, France. It was founded in 1168 by Hugh Wac, of a family that owned Rubercy and other lands in the Cotentin, and was generously supported by gifts from the English and Norman nobility, and from King Henry II. The prominent families of Bacon of Molay and d'Argouges were particular benefactors of the abbey and several of them were buried there.

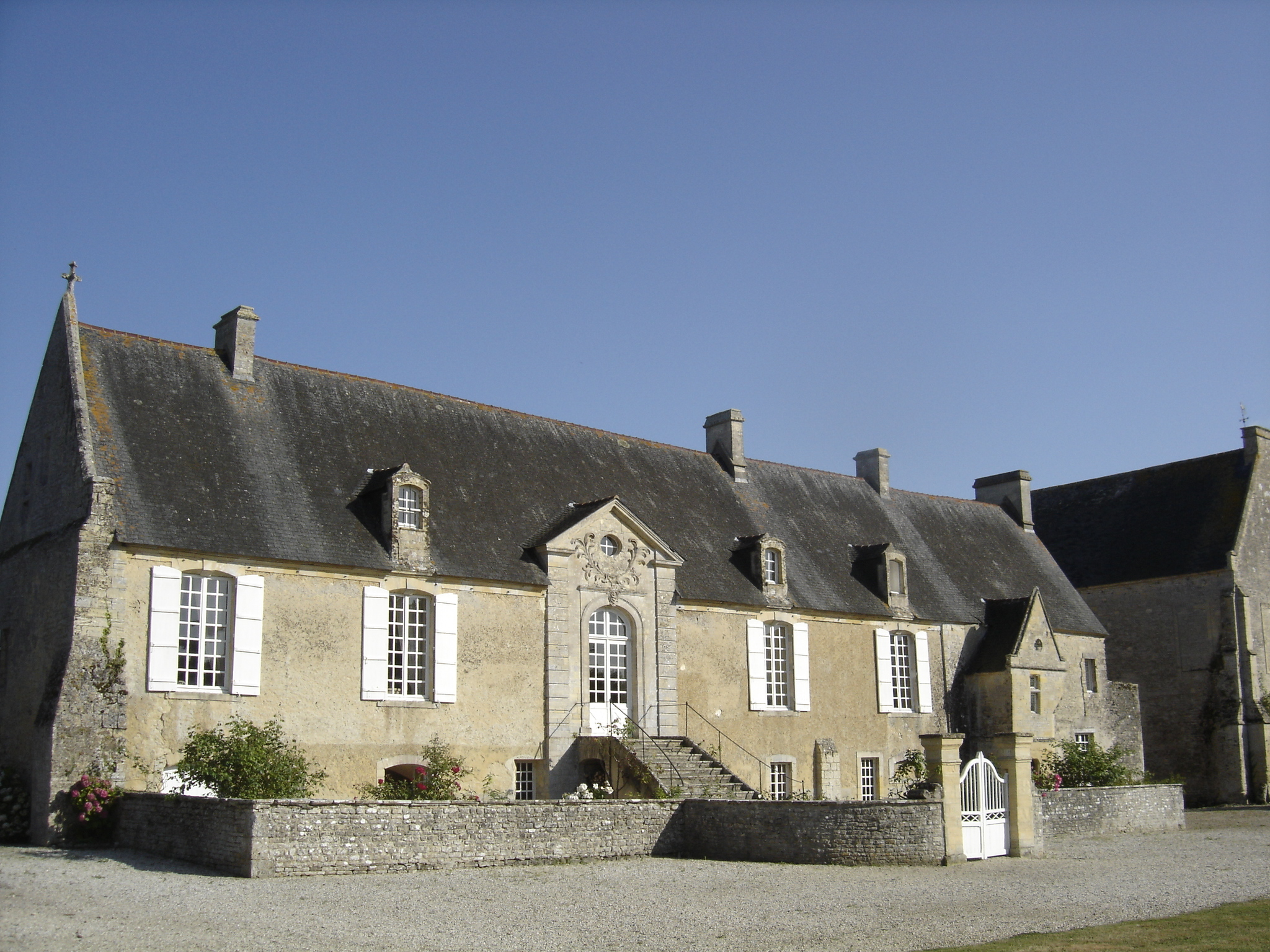
Abbot's Lodging, from the south

From 1526 the abbey was in the hands of commendatory abbots. After a long period of decline, it was finally closed in 1781 under the last commendatory abbot, Emmanuel-Louis de Cugnac, bishop of Lectoure, when its revenues were given to the seminary at Bayeux.

Numerous ruins and structures remain, which have been listed at various times as monuments historiques.
