= Council of Vaison =

Synods held in Vaison, France

The Council of Vaison refers to two separate synods consisting of officials and theologians of the Catholic Church which were held in or near to the Avignon commune of Vaison, France. The first was held in 442 and the second in 529.

== First meeting ==
During the second meeting, 10 canons were decreed, mainly dealing with solidifying the power in which the bishops held, such as that priests should not have fellowship with enemies of the aforesaid.

== Second meeting ==
The third and final council enacted only 5 laws, which mainly related to Mass, including a requirement of repetition of the Kyrie (Lord have mercy) and another which called for regular prayers for the Bishop of Rome.

The meeting was presided over by Caesarius of Arles.
