= Orange Cathedral =

Coordinates: 44°8′17″N 4°48′26″E

- Cathédrale Notre-Dame-de-Nazareth d'Orange
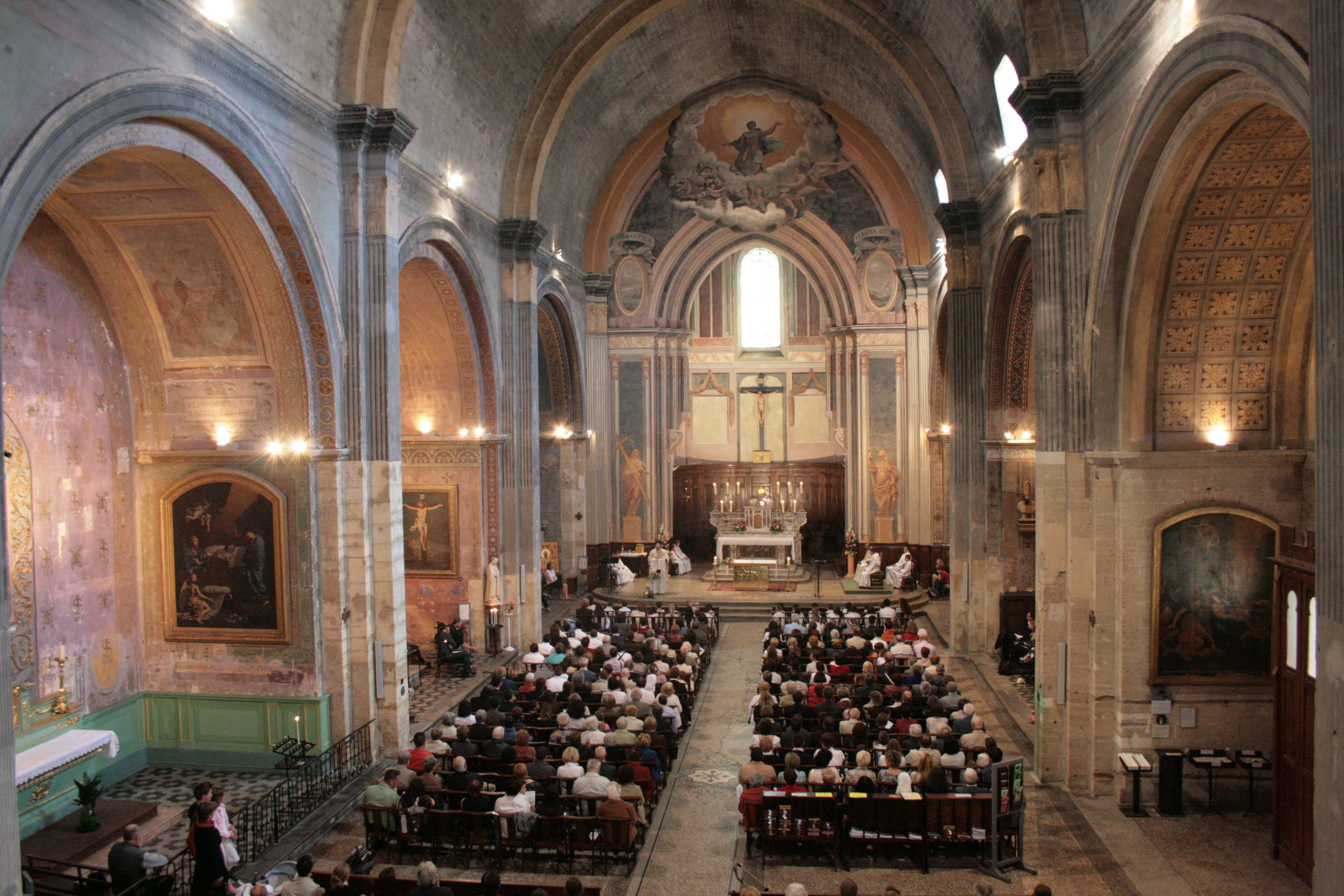
- Interior of the Orange Cathedral
- Orange Cathedral
- Country: France
- Denomination: Roman Catholic

History
- Founded: 12th century

Architecture
- Architectural type: church
- Style: Romanesque
- Groundbreaking: 12th century

Administration
- Division: Provence-Alpes-Côte d'Azur
- Diocese: Roman Catholic Archdiocese of Avignon

Clergy
- Bishop: Jean-Pierre Cattenoz

Orange Cathedral (Cathédrale Notre-Dame-de-Nazareth d'Orange) is a Roman Catholic church and former cathedral, and national monument of France, located in the town of Orange, Vaucluse.

== History ==
The Cathedral of Notre-Dame-de-Nazareth in Orange dates originally from the 4th century. It was rebuilt in the Romanesque style in the twelfth century. Guillaume des Baux, Prince of Orange, attended its consecration in 1208. It was formerly the seat of the Bishopric of Orange, suppressed by the Concordat of 1801. It then became a parish church. During the French Revolution, it was a temple of the Goddess of Reason.

Queen Elizabeth II visited Orange Cathedral on 4th July 1957. She toured the church alongside the local bishop. She returned to the Church on the 7th of July to witness a French Sunday Mass.
