= Council of Orange (529) =

Christian synod condemning semi-Pelagianism

The Second Council of Orange (or Second Synod of Orange) was held in 529 at Orange (civitas Arausicae), which was then part of the Ostrogothic Kingdom. It affirmed much of the theology of Augustine of Hippo and synergism, and made numerous proclamations against what later would come to be known as semi-Pelagian doctrine.

== Questions regarding Pelagianism ==
=== Background ===
Pelagian theology was condemned at the (non-ecumenical) 418 Council of Carthage, and these condemnations were ratified at the ecumenical Council of Ephesus in 431. After that time, a more moderate form of Pelagianism persisted which claimed that man's faith was an act of free will unassisted by previous internal grace. On 3 July 529 a synod took place at Orange. The occasion was the dedication of a church built at Orange by Liberius (praetorian prefect) of Narbonensian Gaul. It was attended by fourteen bishops under the presidency of Caesarius of Arles.

==== Bishops participating ====
- Caesarius of Arles
- Julianus Amartolus (Bishop of Carpentras)
- Constantius (Bishop of Gap)
- Cyprianus (Bishop of Toulon)
- Eucherius (Bishop of Avignon)
- Eucherius
- Heraclius (Bishop of Saint-Paul-trois-Châteaux)
- Principius
- Philagrius (Bishop of Cavaillon)
- Maximus
- Praetextatus (Bishop of Apt)
- Alethius (Bishop of Vaison)
- Lupercianus (Bishop of Fréjus)
- Vindemialis (Bishop of Orange)

=== Conclusions of the Council ===
The question at hand was whether a moderate form of Pelagianism could be affirmed, or if the doctrines of Augustine were to be affirmed. The determination of the council could be considered "semi-Augustinian". It defined that faith, though a free act of man, resulted, even in its beginnings, from the grace of God, enlightening the human mind and enabling belief. It explicitly condemned even the desire to believe in double predestination as heresy, stating, "According to the catholic faith we also believe that after grace has been received through baptism, all baptized persons have the ability and responsibility, if they desire to labor faithfully, to perform with the aid and cooperation of Christ what is of essential importance in regard to the salvation of their soul. We not only do not believe that any are foreordained to evil by the power of God, but even state with utter abhorrence that if there are those who want to believe so evil a thing, they are anathema." It affirms Baptismal Regeneration, which was a universal belief at the time. It received papal approval under Pope Felix IV.

=== Effects ===
The canons of the Second Council seem to have been lost in the tenth century, then recovered and consequently published in 1543. Nonetheless, the teachings of the Council, which followed closely those of Augustine, continued to be adhered to by later medieval scholars, not least of which Thomas Aquinas. The 'Capitula' of Felix IV, on which the Council's 'Capitula' were based, were freely used by the Council of Trent in its condemnation of Luther. Certain Classical Protestants affirm the theology of the Second Council of Orange. Arminian theologians also consider the Council of Orange historically significant in that it strongly affirmed the necessity of prevenient grace and did not present divine grace as irresistible, deny the free will of the unregenerate to repent in faith, or endorse a strictly Augustinian view of predestination.

== Sources ==
- Halfond, Gregory I. (2010). Archaeology of Frankish Church Councils, AD 511-768. Boston-Leiden: Brill. ISBN 978-90-04-17976-9.
- Hefele, Carl Joseph (1895). A History of the Councils of the Church, from the Original Documents. By the Right Rev. Charles Joseph Hefele ... Vol. IV. A.D. 451 to A.D. 680. Edinburgh: T. & T. Clark.
- Hefele, K. J. Consiliengeschichte, ii. 291–295, 724 sqq., Eng. transl., iii. 159–184, iv. 152 sqq.
- Hefele, Karl Joseph von (1856). Conciliengeschichte (in German). Vol. Zweiter Band. Freiburg im Breisgau: Herder.
- Klingshirn, William E. (1994). Caesarius of Arles: Life, Testament, Letters. Liverpool: Liverpool University Press. ISBN 978-0-85323-368-8.
- Maassen, Friedrich (1989). Concilia Aevi Merovingici: 511-695 (in German). Hannover: Impensis Bibliopolii Hahniani. ISBN 978-3-7752-5061-0.
- Mansi, J.-D. (ed.), Sacrorum Conciliorum nova et amplissima collectio editio novissima Tomus VIII (Florence 1762).
- Sirmond, J., Concilia antiqua Gallia, i. 70 sqq., 215 sqq., Paris, 1829.
- Woods, F. A., ed. (1882). Canons of the Second Council of Orange, A. D. 529. text [in Lat.] with an intr., tr. and notes by F.H. Woods (in Latin and English).
