= Semi-Pelagianism =

Early heterodox Christian theological position

Semi-Pelagianism (or semipelagianism) is a historical Christian theological and soteriological school of thought about the role of free will in salvation. In semi-Pelagian thought, a distinction is made between the beginning of faith and the increase of faith. Semi-Pelagian thought teaches that the latter half – growing in faith – is the work of God, while the beginning of faith is an act of free will, with grace supervening only later.

The term "semi-Pelagianism", a 16th-century coinage, is considered a misnomer by many modern scholars. "Semi-Pelagianism" has frequently been used in a pejorative sense.

Semi-Pelagianism was, in the theory, originally developed as a compromise between Pelagianism and the teaching of Church Fathers such as Saint Augustine. Adherents to Pelagianism hold that people are born untainted by sin and do not need salvation unless they choose to sin, a belief which had been condemned as heresy. In contrast, Augustine taught that people cannot come to God without the grace of God. Like Pelagianism, what is now called semi-Pelagianism was labeled heresy by the Western Church at the Second Council of Orange in 529.

In contrast, most Christian communions teach that the initiative for faith comes from God. Some, notably Catholics and Orthodox, teach that it then requires free collaboration on the part of man (synergism): "The fatherly action of God is first on his own initiative, and then follows man's free acting through his collaboration". "Since the initiative belongs to God in the order of grace, no one can merit the initial grace of forgiveness and justification at the beginning of conversion. Moved by the Holy Spirit and by charity, we can then merit for ourselves and for others the graces needed for our sanctification, for the increase of grace and charity, and for the attainment of eternal life."

== Pelagian and semi-Pelagian theology ==
Pelagianism is the teaching that people have the capacity to seek God in and of themselves apart from any movement of God or the Holy Spirit, and therefore that salvation is effected by their own efforts. The doctrine takes its name from Pelagius, a British monk who was accused of developing the doctrine (he himself appears to have claimed in his letters that man does not do good apart from grace, claiming only that all men have free will by God's gift); it was opposed especially by Augustine of Hippo and was declared a heresy by Pope Zosimus in 418. Rejecting the existence of original sin, it teaches that man is in himself and by nature capable of choosing good.

In so-called semi-Pelagian thought, both God and the human person always participate in the salvation process. Humans make free will choices, which are aided by God through creation, natural grace, "supernatural" grace, God's restrictions on demonic invasion; God continually brings the human person to real choices, which God also aids, in the process of spiritual growth to be saved. The entire process is grace; snapshot focus on the specific moments of decision are always in the context of the overarching grace of God. Semi-Pelagianism is similar to synergism, which is the traditional patristic doctrine.

== Patristic era ==
The term "semi-Pelagianism" was unknown in antiquity, appearing for the first time only in the last quarter of the 16th century in connection with Luis de Molina's doctrine of grace: opponents of this theologian believed they saw a close resemblance to the views advocated by monks of Southern Gaul at and around Marseille after 428.

Even after this confusion between the ideas of Molina and those of the monks of Marseille had been exposed as an error, the newly coined term "semi-Pelagianism" was retained in learned circles as an apt designation for the views of those monks, most notably John Cassian, which were said to have aimed at a compromise between Pelagianism and Augustinism. It was condemned as heresy at the local Council of Orange (529) after disputes extending over more than a hundred years. The monks, however, consistent with the Desert Fathers, considered their teaching to be the ancient teaching of the Church.

Several historical teachings have been wrongly claimed to be semi-Pelagian without actually being about the issue of the priority of grace before human will. In particular, in the late 400s Gallic Bishop Faustus of Riez had answered a parishioner's question about whether a deathbed confession by someone in mortal sin was legitimate: in Faustus' opinion there could be no effective absolution despite the decision to repent because there had been no satisfaction (public repudiation of sin, reparation, prayer, etc.) attempted. Faustus' formulation contradicted e.g. the declaration of Pope Celestine I in 428 against "despair in God's mercy" and was rebutted by the writings of Bishop Avitus of Vienne, that the intention to give satisfaction (if the sinner lived, in accordance with canon 13 of the First Council of Nicaea) was perfectly adequate for a genuine repentance. So Faustus' claims concern faith versus the necessity of penitence, not the priority of grace before human will.

== Development of the term and subsequent use ==
=== Early use of the term ===
The first use of the term "semi-Pelagian" was by Theodore Beza. The Epitome of the Lutheran Formula of Concord (1577) rejects "the false dogma of the Semi-Pelagians, who teach that man by his own powers can commence his conversion, but can not fully accomplish it without the grace of the Holy Spirit".

Between 1590 and 1600, the term "semi-Pelagianism" was applied to Luis de Molina's doctrine of grace, which at that time was accused of similarity to the teaching of the Massilians.

=== Eastern Orthodoxy ===
The Orthodox Church generally emphasizes the synergistic doctrine of theosis in its conception of salvation as a process of personal transformation to the likeness of God in Christ through the Spirit. Theosis closely links the ideas of justification and sanctification; salvation is acquired through the divinization of man. This doctrine is sometimes dismissed as semi-Pelagian by theologians of the classical Protestant traditions on the grounds that it suggests that man contributes to his own salvation. The accusation is rejected by Orthodox Christianity, which unlike the established Western traditions remained for the most part uninfluenced by Augustinian theology and holds that "for the regenerated to do spiritual good – for the works of the believer being contributory to salvation and wrought by supernatural grace are properly called spiritual – it is necessary that he be guided and prevented [preceded] by grace ... Consequently, he is not able of himself to do any work worthy of a Christian life".

John Cassian, known particularly for his teachings on theosis, is considered a Saint in the Eastern Churches as well as in Roman Catholicism. He is generally considered to have been an early proponent of semi-Pelagianism. But some recent scholars deny that his views were in fact semi-Pelagian. Lauren Pristas writes: "For Cassian, salvation is, from beginning to end, the effect of God's grace. It is fully divine." Augustine Casiday states that Cassian "baldly asserts that God's grace, not human free will, is responsible for 'everything which pertains to salvation' – even faith". Others hold that "the view of Cassian as the ringleader of 'semi-Pelagianism' rests on a conjectural chronology". The Roman Catholic Church includes John Cassian in its official list of recognized saints, with a feast day on 23 July, and cites him in the Catechism of the Catholic Church. It did not endorse Augustine entirely and, while later Catholic theologians accepted Augustine's authority, they interpreted his views in the light of writers such as Cassian. West and East consider both John Cassian and Augustine of Hippo as saints.

=== Calvinism and Arminianism ===
In more recent times, the term "semi-pelagian" has been used by some Reformed Protestants to label anyone who deviates from Augustinian doctrines of sovereignty, original sin and grace – most notably Arminian Protestants and Roman Catholics. Although Calvinist and Lutheran theologies of salvation differ significantly on issues such as the nature of predestination and the salvific role of the sacraments (see means of grace), both branches of historic Protestantism claim the theology of Augustine as a principal influence.

Many Arminians have disagreed with this generalization, believing it is libelous to Jacobus Arminius (from whose name Arminianism derives) and the Remonstrants who maintained his "Arminian" views after his death. John Wesley (an Anglican defender of Arminianism and founder of Wesleyan Methodism) and other prominent classical and Wesleyan Arminians maintain a doctrine of sin that he called "total corruption" and "entire deprivation" of the human race, which is close but not identical to the Calvinist doctrine of original sin and total depravity. For Wesley, God is constantly seeking to recover his lost sheep, "not wanting anyone to perish, but everyone to come to repentance" (2 Peter 3:9, NIV). As theologian Thomas Oden describes Wesley's view, prevenient grace "begins to enable [not just aid, as in semi-pelagianism] one to choose further to cooperate with saving grace. By offering the will the restored capacity to respond to grace, the person then may freely and increasingly become an active, willing participant in receiving the conditions for justification."

=== Jansenism and the Jesuits ===
The Roman Catholic Church, as mentioned above, condemned semi-pelagianism at the Council of Orange (529), but also does not accept the Calvinist interpretation of Augustine. In the 18th century, the Jesuits accused the Jansenists of affirming the radical Augustinian doctrines of Calvinism; the Jansenists, in turn, accused the Jesuits of semi-Pelagianism. For example Blaise Pascal did so in his Ecrits sur la grace. The 1713 papal bull of Pope Clement XI, Unigenitus, in declaring Jansenism heretical, upheld the Jesuits' objections.

=== Modern ===
Semi-Pelagianism is common in popular evangelicalism, as opposed to scholarly evangelical theology. The term "semi-Pelagianism", a 16th-century coinage, is considered a misnomer by many modern scholars. Proposed alternatives include semi-Augustinianism, anti-Augustinianism, and antipredestinarianism. The historical theological dispute is also known as the Augustinian controversy. "Semi-Pelagianism" has frequently been used in a pejorative sense.

== Sources ==
- Weaver, Rebecca (2014). "Introduction". In Hwang, Alexander Y.; Matz, Brian J.; Casiday, Augustine (eds.). Grace for Grace: The Debates after Augustine and Pelagius. Washington, D.C.: Catholic University of America Press. ISBN 978-0-8132-2601-9.
