= Salonia gens =

Ancient Roman family

The gens Salonia was a plebeian family at ancient Rome. Members of this gens are first mentioned as early as the fourth century BC, but few of them attained any of the higher offices of the Roman state, until the latter part of the first century AD, when they married into the imperial family.

== Origin ==
The nomen Salonius belongs to a large class of gentilicia formed from words ending in -o, using the suffix -onius. The root of the name is salo, a salt-dealer, from sal, salt, and indicates that an ancestor of the Salonii was probably a dealer in salt, one of the most important commodities of antiquity.

== Members ==
This list includes abbreviated praenomina. For an explanation of this practice, see filiation.

- Publius Salonius, military tribune in 342 BC, had been either tribune or centurion primus pilus for several consecutive years. The dictator Marcus Valerius Corvus, in settling a mutiny, agreed to the soldiers' demand that nobody who had been military tribune should subsequently become a centurion, as Salonius had opposed their actions. The senate initially rejected this concession, but agreed when Salonius himself urged its passage in the interests of harmony.
- Gaius Salonius, one of the commissioners appointed to establish a colony at Tempsa in Bruttium in 194 BC. In 173, he was a member of another commission, this time to apportion unoccupied land in Liguria and Cisalpine Gaul to new settlers.
- Quintus Salonius Sarra, praetor in 192 BC, was assigned the province of Sardinia.
- Marcus Salonius, one of Cato's subordinates, whose daughter's hand in marriage Cato sought, when he was an old man.
- Salonia M. f., the second wife of Cato, and mother of Marcus Porcius Cato Salonianus, born when his father was eighty years old.
- Salonia, a Roman matron whose son, Matidius, perhaps the brother-in-law of Trajan, was appointed to the senate by Claudius during the emperor's censorship.
- Gaius Salonius Matidius Patruinus, probably governor of Germania Superior early in the reign of Vespasian, had been praetor in an uncertain year, and was one of the Arval Brethren at the time of his death in AD 78. He married Ulpia Marciana, the sister of Trajan, and was the grandfather of the Roman empress Vibia Sabina.
- Salonia Matidia, the niece of Trajan, and mother of the empress Vibia Sabina.
- Salonia Palestrice, the wife of Marcus Ulpius Hermia, a freedman of Trajan, who was buried at Ampelum in Dacia, aged fifty-five, with a monument from his wife and his freedman, Diogenes, dating to the first half of the second century.
- Marcus Salonius Longinus Marcellus, a senator of imperial times who had held a variety of posts, including tribune of the plebs, prefect of the public treasury, and governor of Africa and Moesia.
- Salonius, bishop of Genua in Liguria in the mid-fifth century. His father was Eucherius, the bishop of Lugdunum, and he had studied under Salvianus.
- Salonius of Embrun, a bishop on whose behalf Guntram, King of Orléans, successfully appealed to Pope John III for restoration to his see.

== See also ==
- List of Roman gentes

== Bibliography ==
- Titus Livius (Livy), History of Rome.
- Lucius Mestrius Plutarchus (Plutarch), Lives of the Noble Greeks and Romans.
- Aulus Gellius, Noctes Atticae (Attic Nights).
- Dictionary of Greek and Roman Biography and Mythology, William Smith, ed., Little, Brown and Company, Boston (1849).
- Theodor Mommsen et alii, Corpus Inscriptionum Latinarum (The Body of Latin Inscriptions, abbreviated CIL), Berlin-Brandenburgische Akademie der Wissenschaften (1853–present).
- George Davis Chase, "The Origin of Roman Praenomina", in Harvard Studies in Classical Philology, vol. VIII, pp. 103–184 (1897).
- T. Robert S. Broughton, The Magistrates of the Roman Republic, American Philological Association (1952–1986).
