= Lydia Delectorskaya =

Russian model (1910–1998)

- Born: 23 June 1910; Tomsk, Russian Empire
- Died: 16 March 1998 (aged 87); Paris, France

Lydia Nikolaevna Délectorskaya (23 June 1910 – 16 March 1998) was a Russian refugee and model best known for her collaboration with Henri Matisse from 1932 onwards.

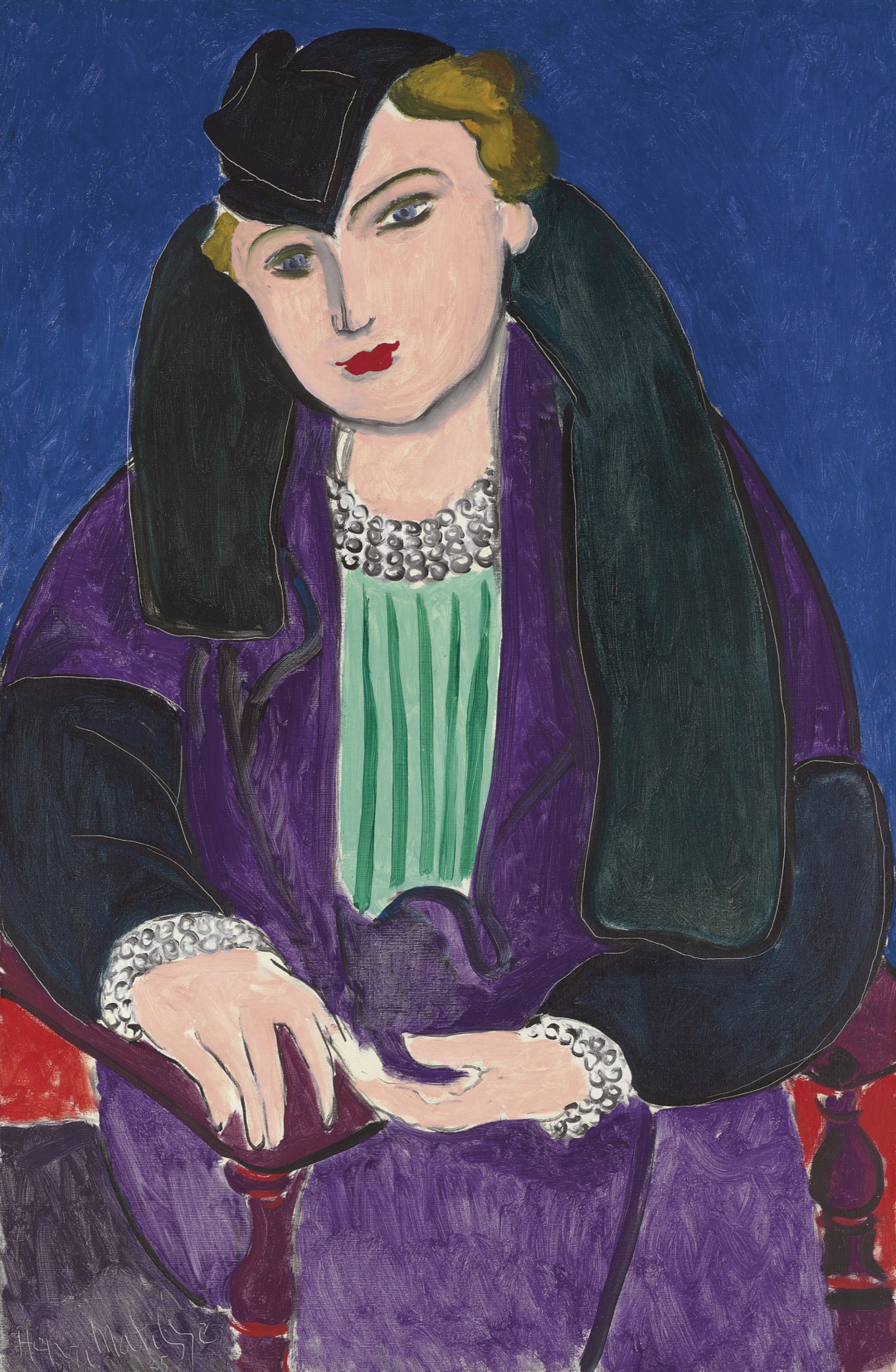
Portrait au manteau bleu by Matisse, 1935

== Early life ==
Born in the Siberian city of Tomsk, the only daughter of a pediatrician, Delectorskaya was orphaned at twelve, when both parents died in successive epidemics of typhus and cholera during the Civil War. Brought up by her aunt, they fled from the Russian Revolution of 1917 to Manchuria, China. Delectorskaya wanted to become a medical doctor, and was accepted in the medical faculty of the Sorbonne, but the high fees charged to foreign students were out of reach and she ended up a penniless exile in Nice. The first paintings Matisse made of Delectorskaya combined the phenomenal virtuosity that had cost him so many years to perfect with his original instinctive ability to compose spontaneously in color. Matisse's son Pierre told his father that he had renewed himself as a painter with Pink Nude, for which Delectorskaya modeled over a period of six months in 1935.

== Career ==
Barely surviving, in 1932, she found temporary work with the Matisses, first as a studio assistant, then as a domestic help. Matisse's wife, Amélie, had become an invalid. It was three years before the painter asked her to sit for him. Delectorskaya was 25, Matisse 65, and with Matisse having an avuncular attitude to the young woman, she wrote:

Gradually I began to adapt and feel less 'shackled,'... in the end, I even began to take an interest in his work.

Together they established a collaboration that gave her a new sense of power and purpose. Taking up the duties of studio manager and factotum along with being principal model, painting became central to her life as it was of Matisse’s. Biographer Hilary Spurling interviewed Delectorskaya several times observing that,

She could have run an army, she had amazing capacities. She ran the studio, she organised the models, she dealt with the dealers, sales people, the gallery... everything worked like clockwork.

Her close working partnership with Matisse drew an ultimatum from his wife of 40 years, "It's her, or me!" and Matisse chose his wife who left anyway in 1939. After he sacked her, Delectorskaya tried to shoot herself in the chest. At his request, she returned to help in the studio in Paris where both were caught up among people fleeing the city after war was declared with Germany. She said,

A decision had to be made there, as to whether or not he was to take me with him.

Matisse drew Delectorskaya in her traveling hood at the start of their journey through war-torn France. She was his great muse, model, manager and companion, staying by his side for the rest of his life.

== Vence ==
The couple set up in Vence when Nice turned out to be unsatisfactory. As his secretary, "Madame Lydia" made it possible for him to produce his final masterpieces in the face of his infirmity and failing health, which resulted in abstraction, a shift from oil paint on canvas to printing and paper, thus creating "a life's work" in Matisse's words. Delectorskaya also coordinated the four years of preparation and installation that went into the chapel at Vence, just outside Nice, which he flooded with blue and yellow light.

The stained glass windows in the Chapelle du Rosaire in Vence, and the colored paper cutouts (Delectorskaya had recruited female assistants to mix gouache paint to his instruction to cover the countless sheets of paper required) "now generally agreed to be among the greatest inventions of the 20th century." Now 84, Matisse died on 3 November 1954. The day before, when she came to his sickbed, Matisse made a last drawing – it was of her, using a ball-point pen.

== Books ==
Delectorskaya authored two authoritative works. Her 1988 book l'Apparente Facilité (Apparent Ease), is her eyewitness account of Matisse's methods documenting his works from 1935 to 1939. Asked how Matisse's drawings seem to have been done in a single flourish, she said she was "a pretty good eraser". Her second book, Henri Matisse: Contre vents et marées (French Edition) 1996 (in English: Against Winds and Storms), is her carefully detailed and documented account of the years of Matisse's "second life" from the early 1940s.

== Legacy ==
Matisse gifted valuable paintings to Delectorskaya, providing for her future. He made at least 90 paintings of her (in addition to numerous drawings and sketches). In turn, she donated the works to Russia's Hermitage Museum in St. Petersburg.

== Death ==
Delectorskaya died aged 87, in Paris on 16 March 1998. Her grave is in the cemetery in Pavlovsk, Saint Petersburg.

== Exhibition ==
An exhibition dedicated to her was held at the Matisse Museum, a tribute to the model that accompanied the last decades of his life (Lydia Delectorskaya, Matisse's muse and model, Musée Matisse, Nice. 18 June – 27 September 2010.) Delectorskaya was blonde with fair skin and Matisse called her the "ice princess". There are more than 100 drawings and sketches for which Lydia modelled, and 90 paintings; among them The Pink Nude, The Romanian Blouse, Woman in a Purple Coat, Blue Eyes, and Le Rêve.

== See also ==
- Annelies Nelck
