= Ancient Diocese of Vence =

Roman Catholic diocese in France (c. 5 century - 1801)

Coordinates: 43.72°N 7.11°E

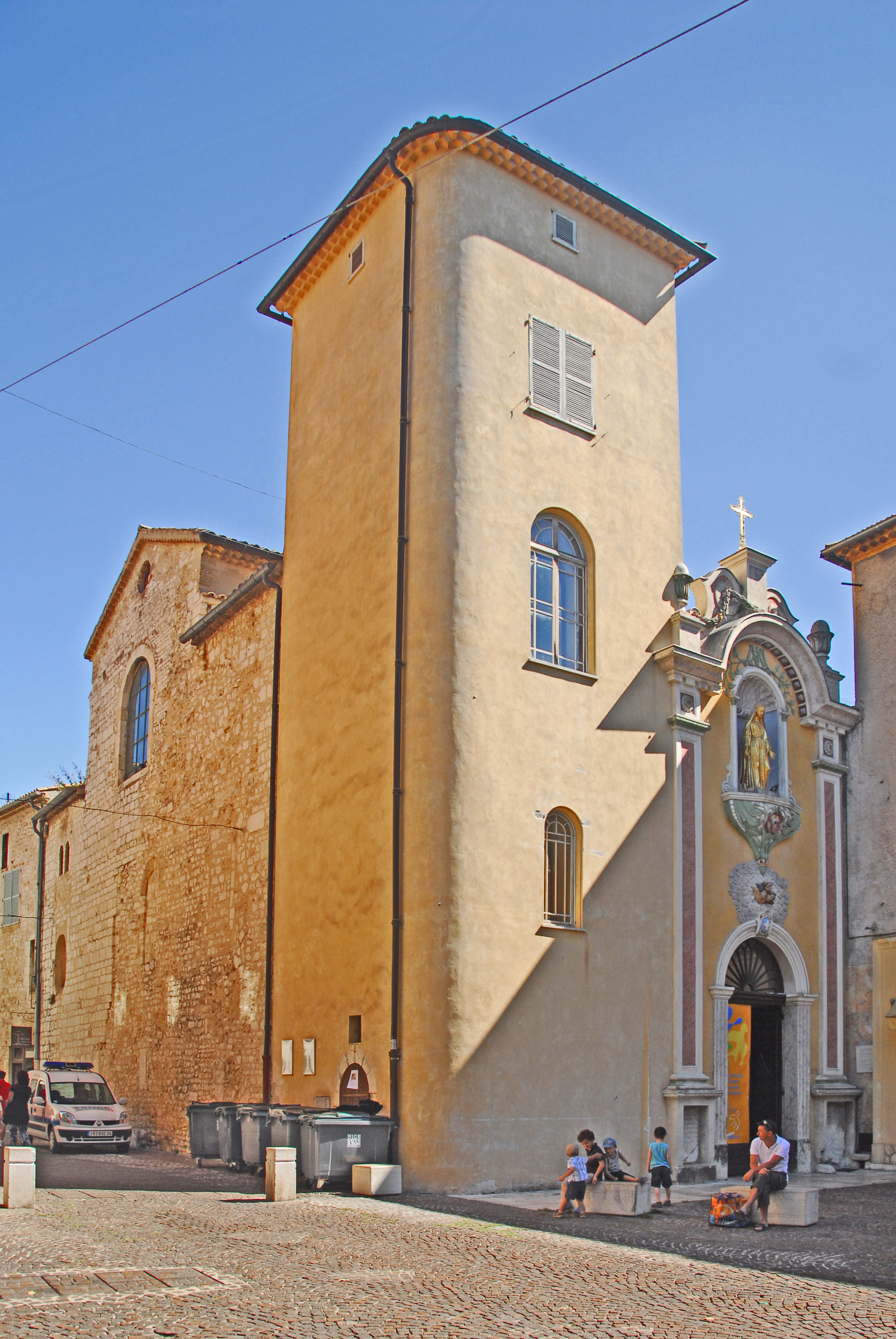
Vence Cathedral

The former French Catholic diocese of Vence existed until the French Revolution. Its see was at Vence in Provence, in the modern department of Alpes Maritimes.

After the Concordat of 1801, the territory of the diocese passed to the diocese of Nice.

== History ==
The first known Bishop of Vence is Severus, bishop in 439 and perhaps as early as 419. Among others are: St. Veranus, son of St. Eucherius, Archbishop of Lyons and a monk of Lérins, bishop before 451 and at least until 465; St. Lambert, first a Benedictine monk (died 1154); Alessandro Farnese (1505–1511).

Antoine Godeau, Bishop of Grasse, was named Bishop of Vence in 1638; the Holy See wished to unite the two dioceses. Meeting with opposition from the chapter and the clergy of Vence Godeau left Grasse in 1653, to remain Bishop of Vence, which see he held until 1672.

== Bishops ==
Bishops of Vence
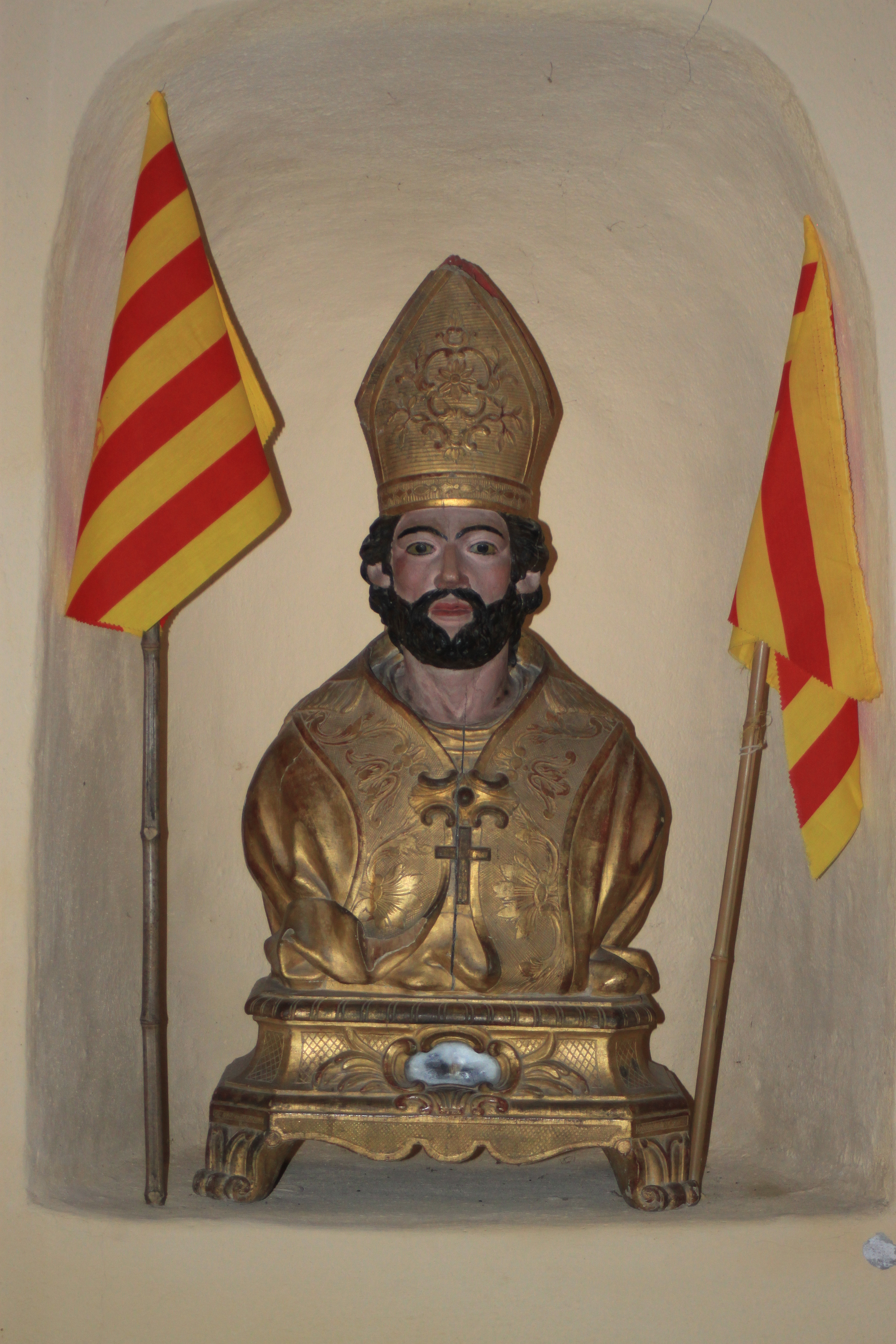
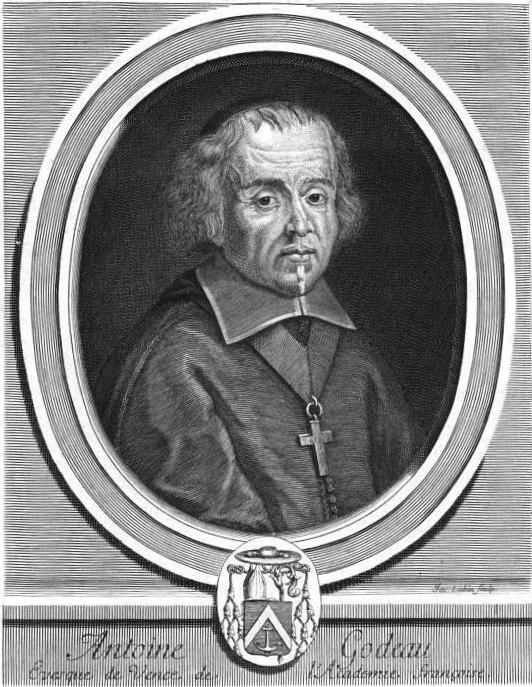
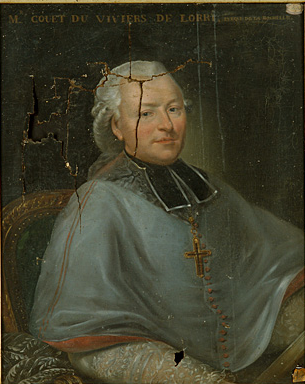
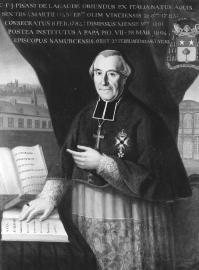
Tenure	Name	remarks
ca. 363	Andinus
374	Eusebius
412	Juvinius
419, 439	Severe
442, 447	Arcadius
451–492	Saint Véran
492–528	Saint Prosper
528–541	Firmin
541–587	Deuthère
587	Fronime de Bourges	previously bishop of Agde
ca. 644	Aurélien
645–865	(unknown)
866	Lieutaud
878	Waldère
878	Witrède
880–896	(unknown)
896, 898	Hugo
995–1015	Arnold
1015–1060	Durand
1060–1114	Pierre I.
1114–1154	Saint Lambert of Vence
1154–1176	Raimond I.
1176–1193	Guillaume I. Giraud
1193–1210	Pierre II. de Grimaldi
1214	(unknown)
1216, 1220	Raimond II.
1222–1257	Guillaume II. Riboti
1257–1263	Pierre III.
1263–1290	Guillaume III. de Sisteron
1291–1308	Pierre IV. d'Avignon
1308–1312	Foulques I.
1312–1319	Pierre V.
1319–1324	Raymond III.
1324–1325	Pierre VI. Malirati
1325–1328	Foulques II. Chatelmi
1328–1335	Raymond IV.
1335–1346	Arnaud Barcillon
1347–1348	Jean I. Coci
1348–1360	Guillaume IV. de Digne
1360–1375	Étienne de Digne
1375–1399	Boniface du Puy
1384–1404	Jean II. Abrahardi
1404–1409	Raphael I.
1409–1415	Jean III.
1415–1420	Paul I. de Caire
1420–1439	Louis I. de Glandèves
1439–1459	Antoine I. Sabranti
1459–1463	Armand I.
1463–1491	Raphaël II. Monso
1491–1494	Jean de Vesc	also bishop of Agde
1494–1501	Aimar de Vesc
1508–1511	Alexander Farnese
1511–1522	Jean-Baptiste Bonjean (Beaujean)
1522–1530	Robert Canalis (Ceneau)
1530–1541	Balthazar de Jarente
1541–1554	Nicolas de Jarente
1555–1560	Jean-Baptiste Raimbaud de Simiane
1560–1575	Louis Grimaldi de Beuil
1576–1588	Audin de Garidelli
1588–1601	Guillaume Le Blanc
1601–1638	Pierre du Vair
1638–1671	Antoine Godeau
1672–1681	Louis de Thomassin	also bishop of Sisteron
1682–1685	Théodore Alart (Allart)
1686–1697	Jean-Balthazar de Cabannes de Viens
1697–1714	François de Berton de Crillon	also archbishop of Vienne
1714–1727	Flodoard Maret (Moret) de Bourchenu	† 1744
1728–1754	Jean-Baptiste de Surian
1755–1758	Jacques de Grasse de Bar	also bishop of Angers
1758–1763	Gabriel-François Moreau	also bishop of Mâcon
1763–1769	Michel-François de Couët du Vivier de Lorry	also bishop of Tarbes and bishop of Angers
1769–1771	Jean de Cayrol de Médaillan	also bishop of Grenoble
1772–1783	Antoine-René de Bardonnenche
1784–1790	Charles-François-Joseph Pisani de La Gaude	then bishop of Namur

== See also ==
- Catholic Church in France
- List of Catholic dioceses in France
- Vence Cathedral

== Bibliography ==
=== Reference Sources ===
- Gams, Pius Bonifatius (1873). Series episcoporum Ecclesiae catholicae: quotquot innotuerunt a beato Petro apostolo. Ratisbon: Typis et Sumptibus Georgii Josephi Manz. pp. 548–549. (Use with caution; obsolete)
- Eubel, Conradus, ed. (1913). Hierarchia catholica, Tomus 1 (second ed.). Münster: Libreria Regensbergiana. p. 301. (in Latin)
- Eubel, Conradus, ed. (1914). Hierarchia catholica, Tomus 2 (second ed.). Münster: Libreria Regensbergiana. p. 175.
- Eubel, Conradus, ed. (1923). Hierarchia catholica, Tomus 3 (second ed.). Münster: Libreria Regensbergiana.
- Gauchat, Patritius (Patrice) (1935). Hierarchia catholica IV (1592-1667). Münster: Libraria Regensbergiana. p. 219.
- Ritzler, Remigius; Sefrin, Pirminus (1952). Hierarchia catholica medii et recentis aevi V (1667-1730). Patavii: Messagero di S. Antonio.

=== Studies ===
- Jean, Armand (1891). Les évêques et les archevêques de France depuis 1682 jusqu'à 1801 (in French). Paris: A. Picard. p. 520.
- Pisani, Paul (1907). Répertoire biographique de l'épiscopat constitutionnel (1791-1802) (in French). Paris: A. Picard et fils.
