= Lambert of Vence =

French Roman Catholic saint

Saint Lambert of Vence
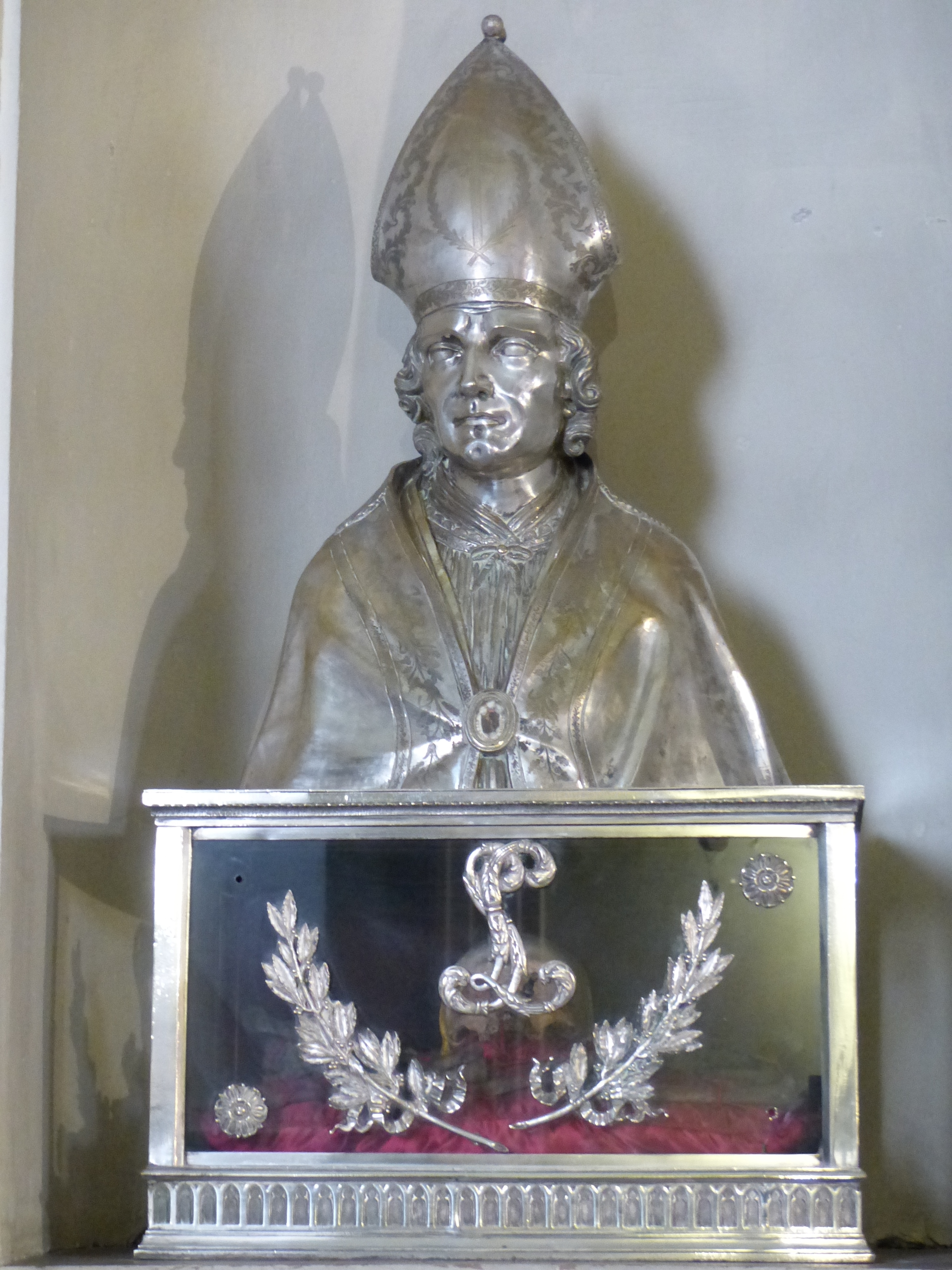
- Reliquary bust of Lambert of Vence in the Vence Cathedral

Bishop of Vence
- Born: 1084; Bauduen, France
- Died: 1154; Vence, France
- Venerated in: Roman Catholic Church
- Feast: 26 May

Lambert of Vence, also known as Lambert of Bauduen, was Bishop of Vence. Born Pelloquin Lambert, at Bauduen, France, in 1084. He lost his mother at birth and was raised at the age of twelve years by the Benedictine monks of Lérins. He was appointed Bishop of Vence in 1114, and remained in the see until his death in 1154. During his episcopate he sent to Bauduen relics of St Véran for whom he had great reverence. The relics of Lambert are still enshrined in Vence.
