= Vence =

Commune in Alpes-Maritimes, France

Vence Vença (Occitan)
- Commune
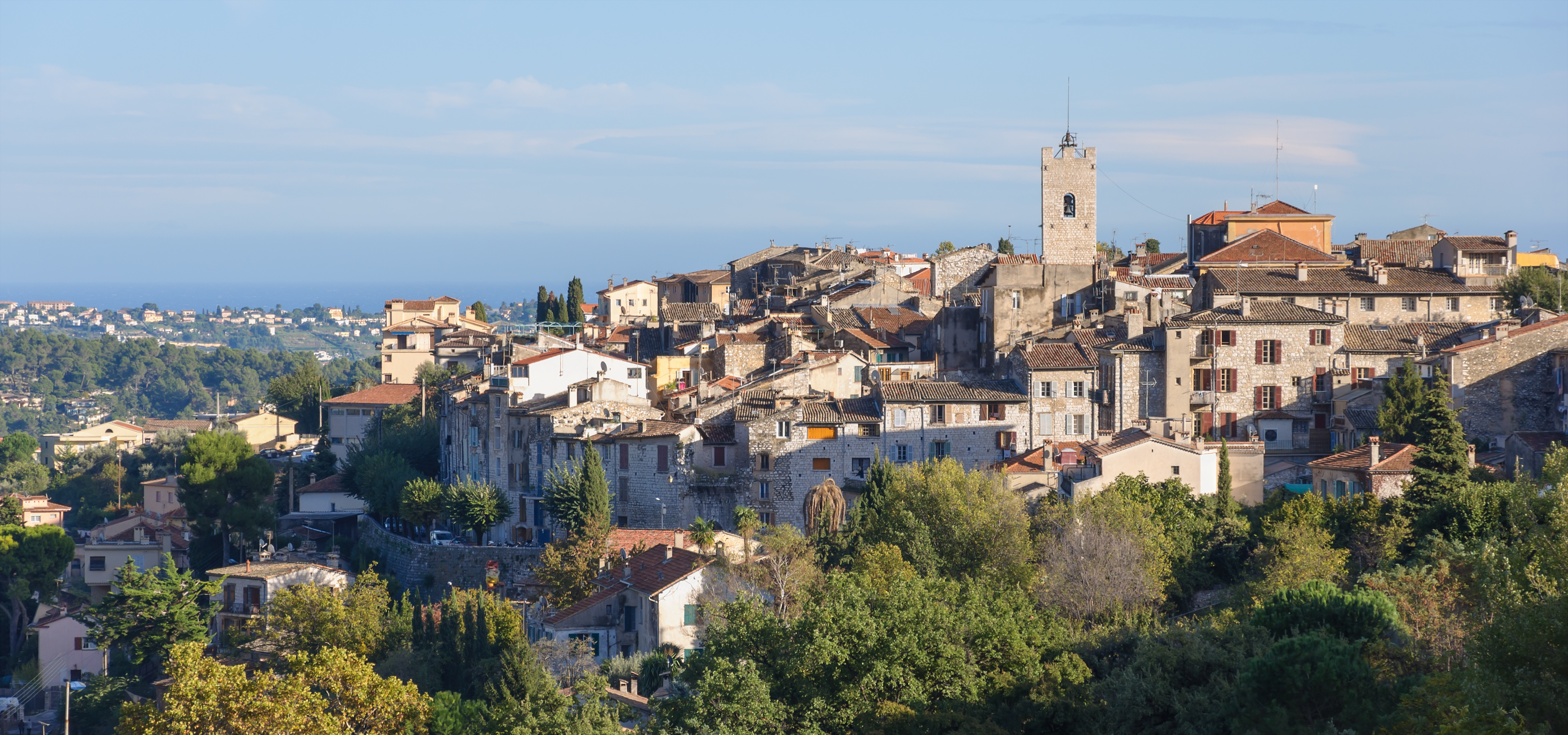
- A view of Vence with the Mediterranean Sea in the background

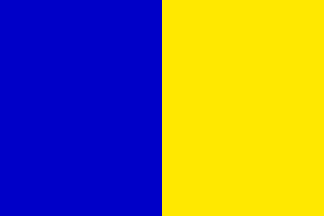
- Flag Coat of arms
- Location of Vence
- Location within France Location within Provence-Alpes-Côte d'Azur
- Coordinates: 43°43′25″N 7°06′51″E
- Country: France
- Region: Provence-Alpes-Côte d'Azur
- Department: Alpes-Maritimes
- Arrondissement: Grasse
- Canton: Vence
- Intercommunality: Métropole Nice Côte d'Azur

Government
  - Mayor (2026–32): Anne Sattonnet
- Area^{1}: 39.23 km^{2} (15.15 sq mi)
- Elevation: 325 m (1,066 ft)
- Highest elevation: 1,033 m (3,389 ft)
- Lowest elevation: 40 m (130 ft)
- Population (2023): 19,917
  - Density: 507.7/km^{2} (1,315/sq mi)
- Demonym: Vençois
- Time zone: UTC+01:00 (CET)
  - Summer (DST): UTC+02:00 (CEST)
- INSEE/Postal code: 06157 /06140
- ^{1} French Land Register data, which excludes lakes, ponds, glaciers > 1 km^{2} (0.386 sq mi or 247 acres) and river estuaries.

Vence (French pronunciation: [vɑ̃s]; Occitan: Vença) is a commune set in the hills of the Alpes-Maritimes department in the Provence-Alpes-Côte d'Azur region in Southeastern France, north of Nice and Antibes on the Mediterranean coast.

== Ecclesiastical history ==
The first known Bishop of Vence is Severus, bishop in 439 and perhaps as early as 419.

Among others are: Veranus, son of St. Eucherius, Archbishop of Lyon and a monk of Lérins, bishop before 451 and at least until 465; St. Lambert, first a Benedictine monk (died 1154); Cardinal Alessandro Farnese (1505–11).

Antoine Godeau, Bishop of Grasse, was named Bishop of Vence in 1638; the Holy See wished to unite the two dioceses. Meeting with opposition from the chapter and the clergy of Vence Godeau left Grasse in 1653, to remain Bishop of Vence, which see he held until 1672.

The diocese of Nice now unites the three former Dioceses of Nice, Grasse and Vence.

== Demographics ==
Historical population
Year	Pop.	±% p.a.
1968	9,420	—
1975	11,385	+2.74%
1982	13,119	+2.05%
1990	15,330	+1.97%
1999	16,982	+1.14%
2007	19,479	+1.73%
2012	19,241	−0.25%
2017	18,465	−0.82%
2023	19,917	+1.27%
Source: INSEE

== Sights ==
Within the historic village, a medieval walled village, there are numerous interesting sights and monuments. The Peyra Gate was remodelled in 1810. The fountain was rebuilt in 1822 replacing an older one dating from 1578. Nearby is an ash tree, donated by François I and planted in 1538. The castle is today the Fondation Émile Hugues, a modern and contemporary art museum. The cathedral was built in the 4th century on the site of a Roman temple. The stone of the western façade dates from 239. Another, on the right, was engraved in December 220. Other stones in the external walls represent funerary dedications. Also on the western side of the church, the Pierre du Tauroble evokes the cult of Cybele and also the Great mother of the Gods of Mount Ida. A chapel in the cathedral has a mosaic by Marc Chagall, dated 1979. The rue des Portiques is a section of the old Roman road.

The town has a small chapel, up above the Cité Historique Chapelle du Rosaire (1948, completed in 1951), decorated with stained glass and other fittings by Henri Matisse, who owned a home in the village towards the end of his life.

Vence is famous for its spring water, which can be collected from numerous fountains in the town.

== Education ==
=== Nursery schools ===
- École Maternelle lei bigaradie
- École Maternelle du Signadour
- École Maternelle de l'ouest

=== Primary schools ===
- École primaire du Suve
- École primaire Saint-Michel
- École primaire Toreille
- École primaire Chagall
- École Célestin Freinet

=== Grammar school ===
- Collège La Sine
- College Des Baous

=== High school ===
- Lycée Henri Matisse

== Notable people ==
- Henri Matisse (1869-1954) artist, painter
- Marc Chagall (1887-1985) artist, painter
- Jean Vincent de Crozals (1922–2009) painter, sculptor
- Eduardo Lourenço (1923-2020) essayist, philosopher
- Annelies Nelck (1925–2014) painter, engraver

== See also ==
- Vence Cathedral
- Saint-Paul-de-Vence
- Communes of the Alpes-Maritimes department
