= Sisteron Cathedral =

Roman Catholic church in Sisteron, France

Coordinates: 44°11′44″N 5°56′37″E

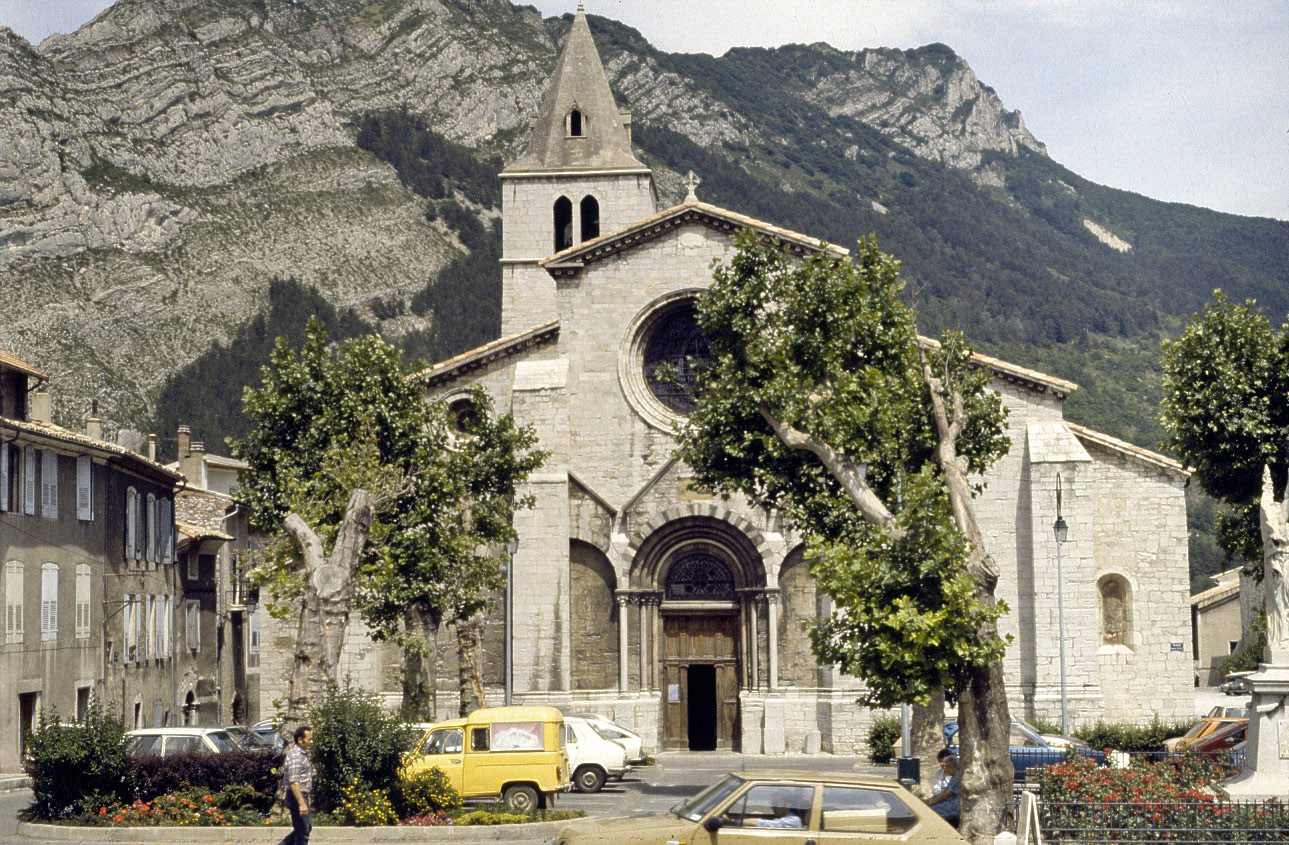
Sisteron Cathedral

Sisteron Cathedral, now the Church of Notre-Dame-des Pommiers (Cathédrale or Concathédrale Notre-Dame-et-Saint-Thyrse de Sisteron; Église Notre-Dame des Pommiers, or "Our Lady of the Appletrees") is a Roman Catholic church located in Sisteron, Alpes-de-Haute-Provence, France. It was formerly a cathedral, and is a national monument.

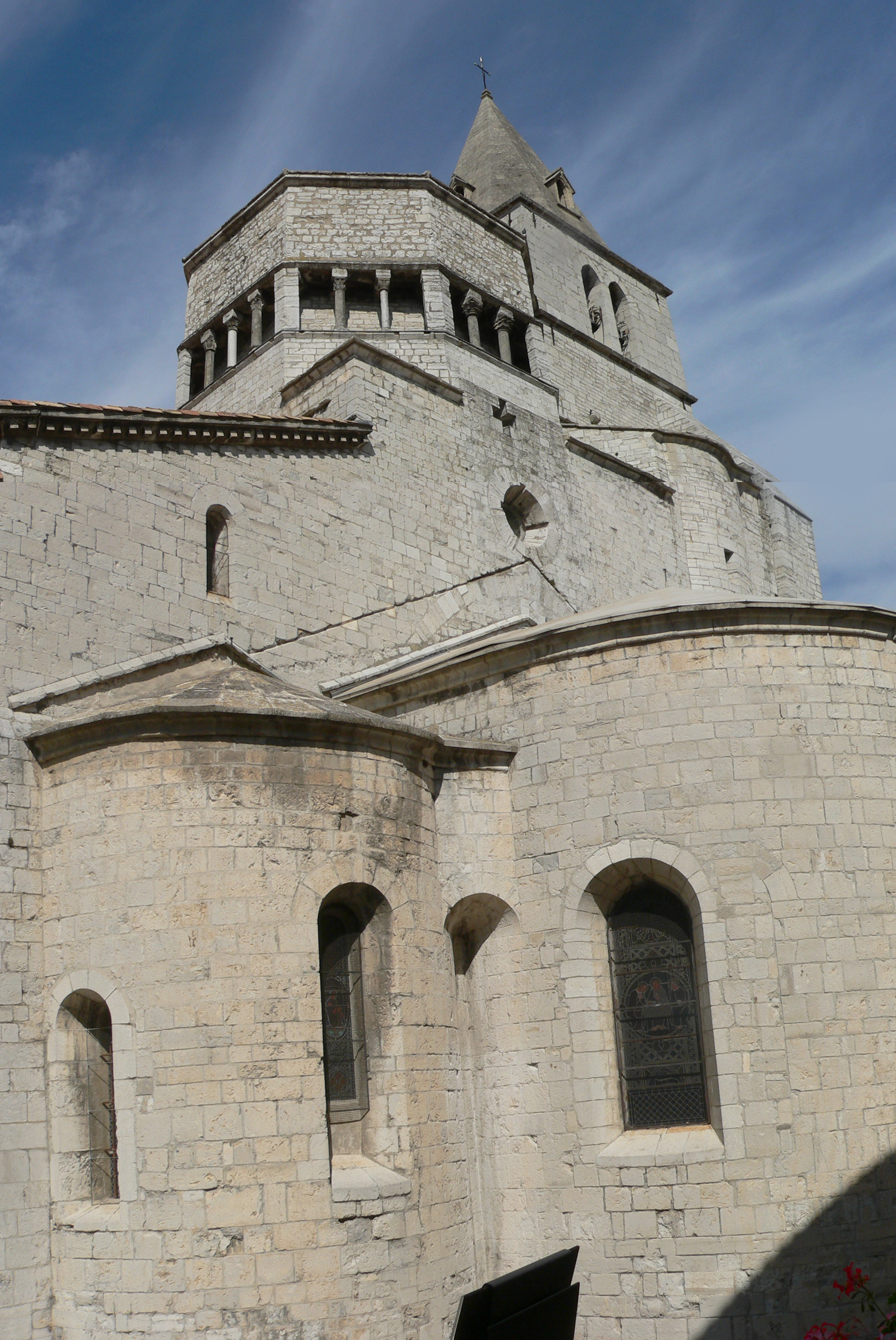
Sisteron Cathedral

The cathedral, dedicated to the Blessed Virgin Mary and Saint Thyrsus, was the seat of the Bishops of Sisteron, who had a second seat at Forcalquier Cathedral. The bishopric was abolished under the Concordat of 1801 and merged into the Diocese of Digne.

The Romanesque building, one of the most sizeable religious structures in Provence, was built between 1160 and 1220.

== Sources ==
- Catholic Encyclopedia: Digne, incl. Sisteron
