= Veranus =

Veranus may refer to:

- Veranus of Vence (died 480), Bishop of Vence and saint
- Veranus of Cavaillon (died 590), Bishop of Cavaillon and saint
