= Agroecius (bishop of Sens) =

5th-century Bishop of Sens

Agroecius or Agroetius was an ancient Gaul who was bishop of Sens. He was also a grammarian, and the author of an extant work in Latin, De Orthographia et Differentia Sermonis, intended as a supplement to a work on the same subject by Flavius Caper. It was composed around 450, and dedicated to the bishop Eucherius of Lyon, who apparently had earlier given Agroecius a copy of Caper's work. He is supposed to have lived in the middle of the 5th century. His work is reprinted in Putschius' Grammaticae Latinae Auctores Antiqui, pp. 2266–2275.

Agroecius was the addressee of one extant letter from Sidonius Apollinaris, who sought Agroecius' aid in the dispute over who would inherit the vacant bishop's see in Bourges in 470 (Agroecius indeed traveled to Bourges to render his assistance); and he is probably alluded to (although not named) in another of Apollinaris' letters, which speaks of a bishop of great eloquence and learning. There was also at that time a bishop "Agrycius", the addressee of a letter of Salvian apologizing for his disrespectful behavior, who is generally taken to be this Agroecius.

Agroecius was possibly a descendant of the rhetorician Censorius Atticus.
