= Le Rêve (Matisse) =

1935 painting by Henri Matisse

- Artist: Henri Matisse
- Year: May 1935
- Medium: Oil on canvas
- Location: Musée national d'Art moderne, Paris

Le Rêve (English: The Dream) is a painting created by the French artist Henri Matisse in May 1935. This oil on canvas depicts a woman in the nude who is shown dreaming. It is held in the collection of the Musée national d'Art moderne in Paris. Another painting by Matisse with the same title was created a few years later in 1940.

== History ==
The painting dates from 1935. In that year, Lydia Delectorskaya began posing daily as a nude model for Matisse, and this painting portrays her in one of her familiar poses.

== Another painting titled Le Rêve (1940) ==
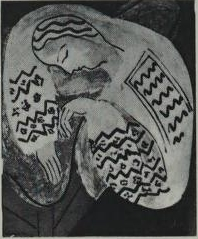
The Dream (Le Rêve), 1940

Another painting by Matisse, created a few years later in 1940, also bears the title Le Rêve. It was painted in Nice shortly after the beginning of World War II. In a letter to his son Pierre, Matisse described the painting's evolution: "this painting began very realistically, depicting, sleep amidst fruits on my marble table, a beautiful brunette, who became an angel sleeping on a violet surface." It has been presented in several exhibitions, including the 2012 Pompidou exhibition Matisse: Pairs and Series, and earlier at the Galerie Maeght from 7–29 December 1945.

In this later painting, the dreaming young woman is no longer nude but wears a garment whose motifs recall those of The Romanian Blouse, also painted in 1940. Its overall tone is more somber than that of The Romanian Blouse.
