= Flavius Caper =

Flavius Caper was a Roman grammarian of Latin who flourished during the 2nd century AD.

Caper devoted special attention to the early Latin writers, and is highly spoken of by Priscian. Caper was the author of two works: De Lingua Latina and De Dubiis Generibus. These works in their original form are lost; but two short treatises entitled De Orthographia (by Agroecius) and De Verbis Dubiis have come down to us under his name, probably excerpts from the original works, with later additions by an unknown writer.

See F. Osann, De Flavio Capro (1849), and review by W Christ in Philologus, xviii.165–170 (1862), where several editions of other important grammarians are noticed; G. Keil, De Flavio Grammatico, in Dissertationes Halenses, x (1889); text in H. Keil's Grammatici Latini, vii.
