= Jean Vincent de Crozals =

French painter, sculptor (1922–2009)

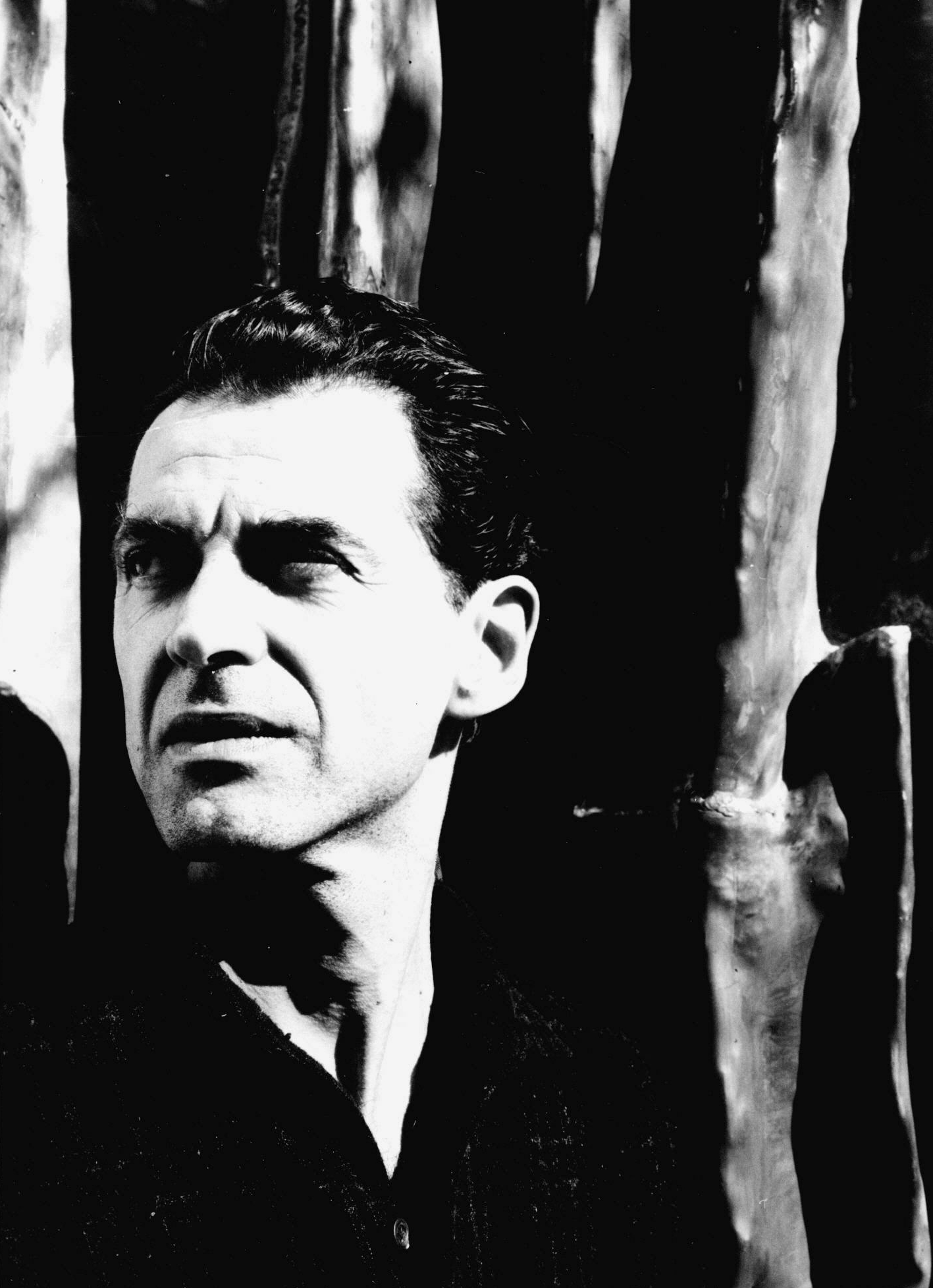
- Jean Vincent de Crozals, 1964
- Born: 8 August 1922; Toulouse, France
- Died: 9 August 2009 (aged 87); Antibes, France
- Occupations: Painter, sculptor
- Spouse(s): Annelies Nelck (m. 1947–1967; divorce), Hannelore Micknass (m. 1974–)
- Children: 2

Signature
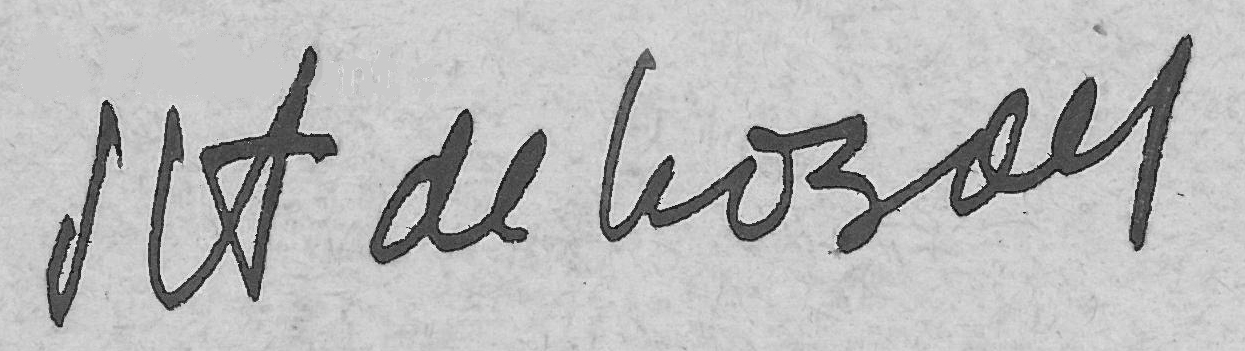

Jean Vincent de Crozals (1922 – 2009) was a French painter and sculptor. He worked in wood, stone, reinforced cement, bronze, iron, ceramics, and paper; and was known for his animal sculptures and gouache paintings.

== Early life and family ==
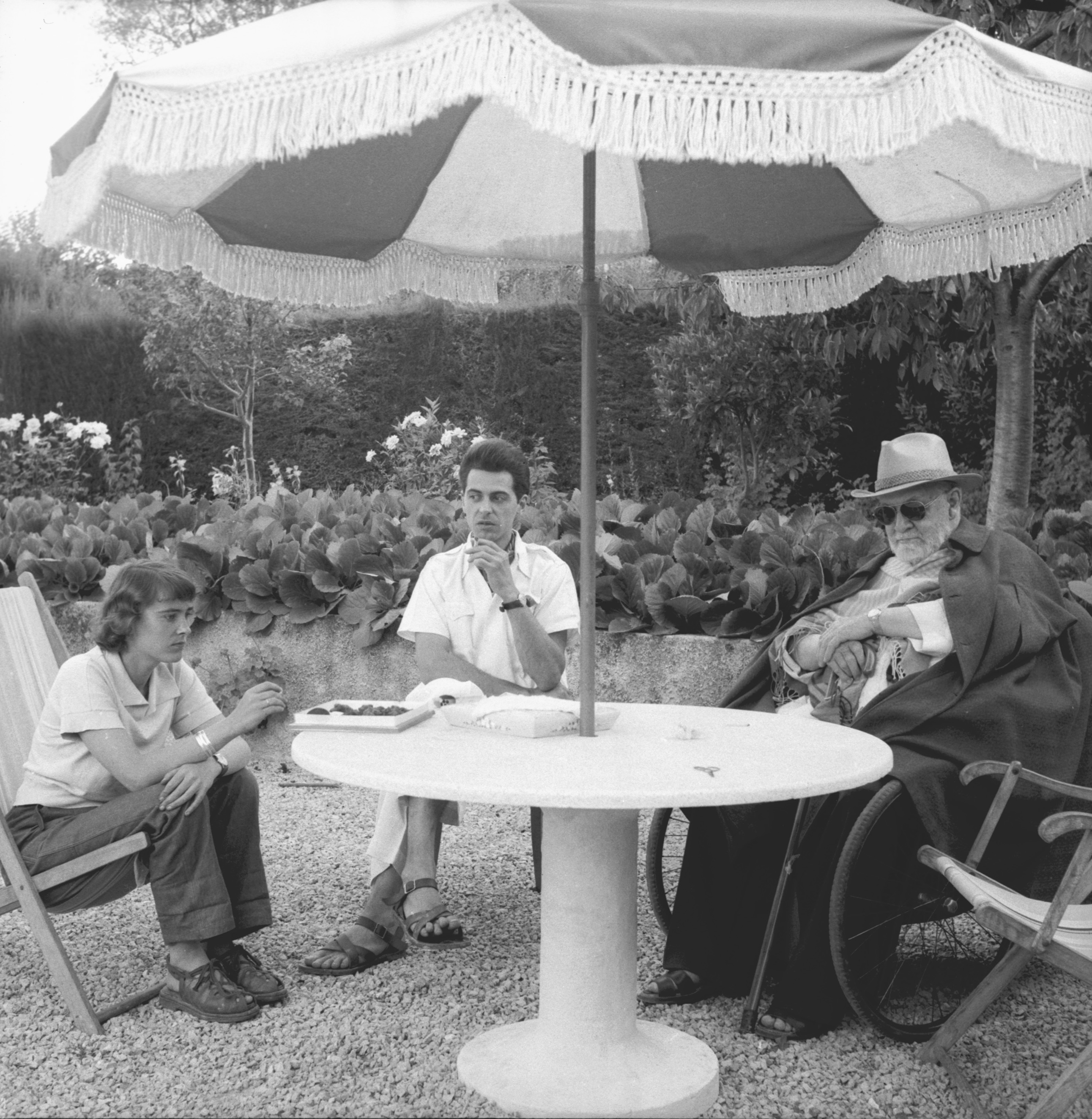
Annelies Nelck, Jean Vincent de Crozals, and Henri Matisse, in Vence (1953)

Jean Vincent de Crozals was born on 8 August 1922, in Toulouse, France. He was raised in South of France and Tunisia. He served in the French military in the Tunisian campaign from 1942 to 1943. By the end of 1945, he settled in Vence, France and was working as an artist.

From 1947 to 1967, de Crozals' first marriage was to the painter Annelies Nelck (nicknamed Anatole), which ended in divorce.

== Career ==
In 1949, French artist Henri Matisse asked de Crozals to model for his drawings of Christ in the Chapelle du Rosaire de Vence in Vence.

From 1950 to 1951, Russian–French artist Marc Chagall hired de Crozals in Vence to produce various ceramic works.

He exhibited at the Salon de la Jeune Sculpture in Paris starting in 1952, at the Salon Comparaisons in Paris in 1956, and at the 2nd Exposition Internationale de Sculpture at the Musée Rodin. De Crozals produced numerous public sculptures, including for the Collège Technique in Marseilles and the Faculté des Sciences in Nice. In the second half of his life he focused on working in bronze and papier-mâché.

In 1974, de Crozals settled in Nörvenich, Germany with his second wife Hannelore Micknass and their two sons Cyrille and Jean Marie.

De Crozals died on 9 August 2009, in Antibes, and his ashes were scattered in a memorial garden in Nice, France.
