= Carolina Müller-Möhl =

Swiss businesswoman (born 1968)

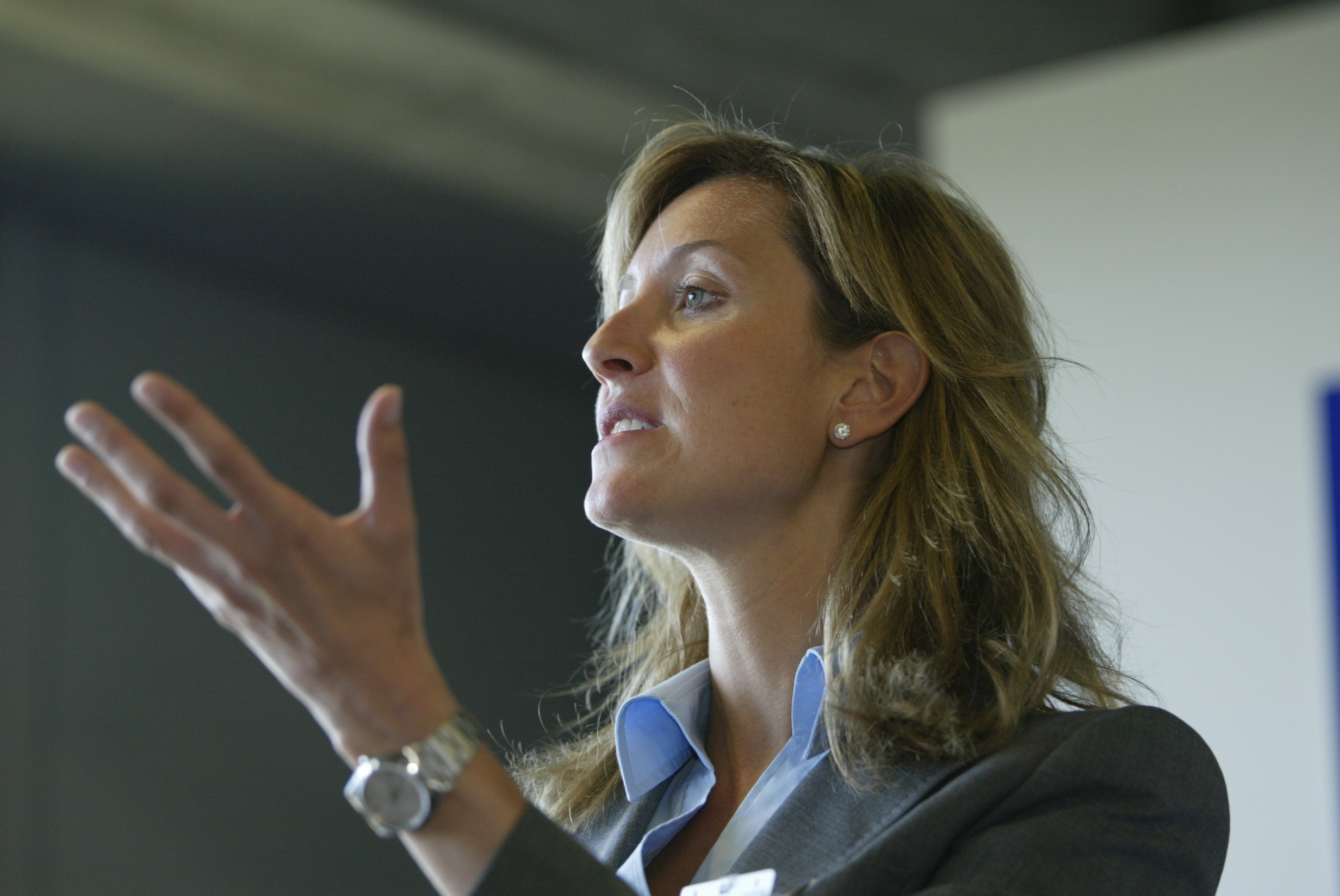
- Müller-Möhl at the 2005 St. Gallen Symposium
- Born: Carolina Eva Maria Katan; November 29, 1968 (age 57); Zürich, Switzerland
- Education: Salem Castle School
- Alma mater: Heidelberg University; London School of Economics and Political Science; Free University of Berlin (MA)
- Occupations: Businesswoman, philanthropist, activist
- Known for: Founding and leading the Müller-Möhl Group; Founding and leading the Müller-Möhl Foundation; Women's activism
- Spouses: Ernst Müller-Möhl (m. 1997; died 2000) Raymond Bär (m. 2025)
- Children: 1
- Relatives: Annelies Nelck (paternal grandmother)

Carolina Eva Maria Müller-Möhl (born 29 November 1968) is a Swiss businesswoman, private investor and philanthropist who is also known for women's activism. In 2023, her net worth was estimated at 700–800 million Swiss Francs (approximately $770–880m in 2024).

== Early life and education ==
Müller-Möhl completed her Abitur at the Schule Schloss Salem and then studied Political Science, History and Jurisprudence at Heidelberg University, London School of Economics and Political Science and Free University of Berlin, where she completed her Master of Arts in Political Science. Additionally, Müller-Möhl completed a certification in Women's Leadership Board at Harvard Kennedy School in Cambridge, Massachusetts and further qualifications at the Institute for European Studies at the University of Basel.

== Career ==
In 2000, Müller-Möhl founded Müller-Möhl Group as a single family office to actively manage the family's estate and assets. In 2012 she founded the Müller-Möhl Foundation, which she also chairs, to address socio-political causes such as education, gender equality and philanthropy in general.

She currently sits on the supervisory board of Fielmann AG (since 2015). She has also served on the boards of directors of various companies, including Nestlé (2004-2012), Kühne Holding AG (2006-2008), Orascom (2008- 2022),Neue Zürcher Zeitung (2010-2022). At Nestle she also served on the Nomination Committee, where she played a significant part in increasing the represantation of women on the board.

Furthermore, she sits on several advisory boards and boards of trustees, including the think tank Avenir Suisse, the Departement of Economics at the University of Zurich, the MBA for Woman Foundation, Allbright Foundation and Woman Political Leaders. From 2013 to 2024 Müller-Möhl was a member of the advisory board of the Bertelsmann Foundation. She is a jury member of the SEF.WomanAward, presented annaully by the Swiss Economic Forum.

Müller-Möhl regularly appears as speaker, panellist and as columnist for Women in Business.

== Awards ==
In 2007 the World Economic Forum nominated her as Young Global Leader in recognition of her success and her socio-political engagement.

== Nominations ==
From the World Woman Foundation Müller-Möhl received the World Woman Hero Award in 2025.

Müller-Möhl has been namend one of the Top 100 Women in Business in Switzerland for many years. Bilanz ranks her among the Who's Who of investors in Switzerland.

== Personal life ==
In 1997, she married Ernst Müller-Möhl (1957–2000), private banker and financier. He died in an plane accident in 2000.

They had one son: Elias Müller-Möhl (born 1998), an alum of Columbia University, based in New York City.

In 2025, Müller-Möhl married secondly to Raymond Bär (born 1959), of the Baer family, in a private civil ceremony in St. Moritz. They were in a relationship for the past ten years.
