= Louis de Thomassin =

French bishop (1637–1718)

- Bishop of Sisteron
- Church: Catholic Church
- Diocese: Diocese of Sisteron
- In office: 1682-1718
- Previous post: Bishop of Vence (1672–1682)

Personal details
- Born: 16 June 1637
- Died: 16 July 1718 (aged 81)

Louis de Thomassin (16 June 1637–16 July 1718) was a French Catholic priest. He was coadjutor bishop of Vence from 1672 to 1682 for Antoine Godeau and bishop of Sisteron from 1682 to 1718.

== Bishops of Sisteron ==
- List of bishops of Sisteron at Ancient Diocese of Sisteron

== External link ==
- Profile at Catholic Hierarchy
