= Galla (wife of Eucherius) =

Late Roman female letter writer and ascetic

- Born: c. 380
- Died: c. 420s
- Notable work: Correspondent of Paulinus of Nola

Galla (c. 380 – c. 420s) was a late Roman woman who was a correspondent of Paulinus of Nola, and the wife of Eucherius of Lyon.

== Biography ==
Whilst little is known about the life of Galla, she is a significant late Roman woman since Paulinus of Nola addressed Epistola 51 to her and her husband, making her one of the few late Roman women known by name. This letter is also one of the last known to be written by Paulinus.

Galla was married to Eucherius, who became bishop of Lyon in 434. They had two sons: Veranus and Salonius, who were born c. 400. According to some sources, they also had two daughters, Consortia and Tullia. Galla's date of birth is unknown, but it could have been c. 380.

After their sons were born, Eucherius suggested that they alter their way of life to become more holy, leading the family to become religious ascetics together. Galla and Eucherius' marriage evolved to run on ascetic principles, like other 'marriages of friendship' undertaken by other religious figures such as Paulinus and Therasia of Nola. The Vita Sanctae Consortiae tells us that their religious conversion involved intense isolation.

In the 420s monks from Lérins visited Paulinus and told him how Eucherius, Galla and their sons were living an ascetic and secluded life in the monastery there. Both sons were later sent to visit Paulinus of Nola. The family practised "unwealth" - where life was restricted to the minimum in order to support prayer and devotion.

After the death of Galla, Eucherius retired to Lerins. Since Epistola 51 was written in either 421 to 426, we can assume Galla died some time after then in the 420s.
