= Annelies Nelck =

French painter, engraver (1925–2014)

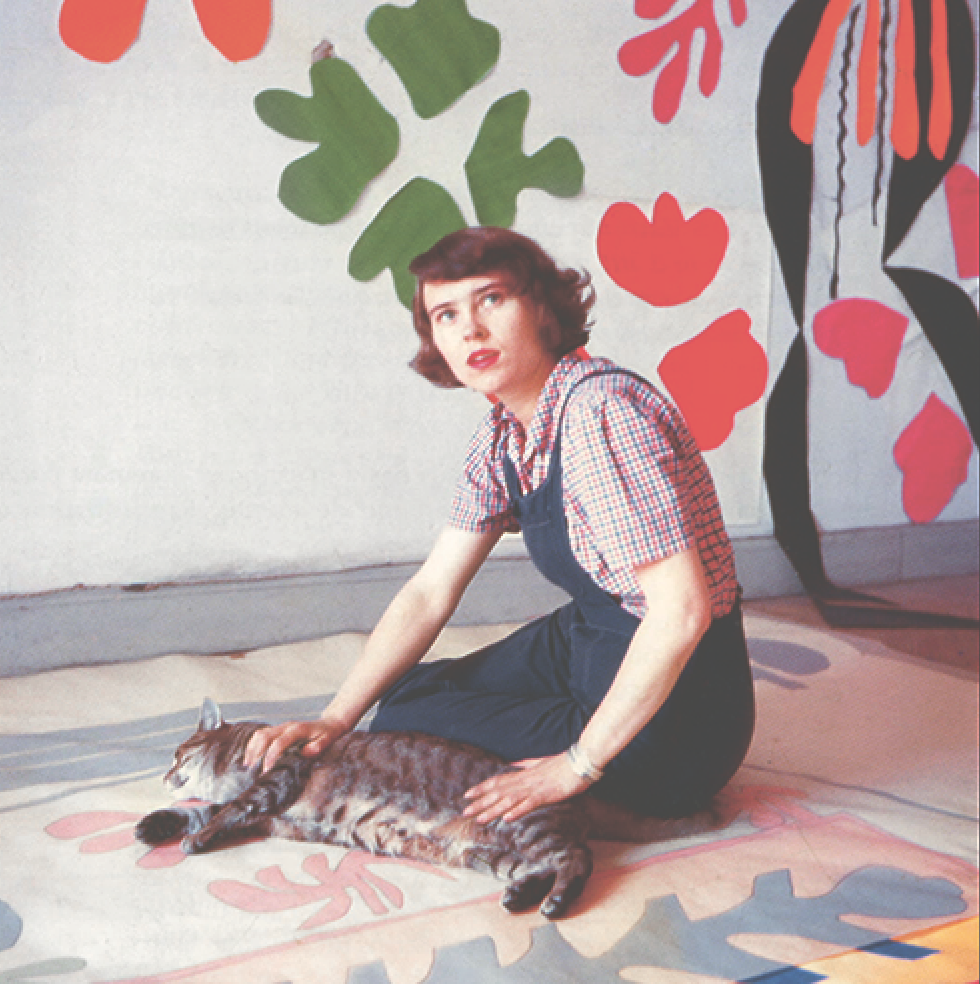
- Born: 26 July 1925; Nice, France
- Died: 22 August 2014 (aged 89); Nexon, France
- Other names: Anatole Nelck, Annalies Nelck
- Occupation(s): Painter, engraver, drawer
- Movement: Outsider art
- Spouse(s): Ernst Katan (m. 1943–1944; his death); Jean Vincent de Crozals (m. 1947–1967; divorce)
- Children: 1
- Relatives: Carolina Müller-Möhl (granddaughter)

Annelies "Anatole" Nelck (26 July 1925 – 22 August 2014) was a French painter and engraver, of Dutch ancestry. She was known for her paintings of landscapes of the South of France, and still-lifes. Nelck had served in the 1940s as Henri Matisse's assistant, and as a model for his works.

== Early life and education ==
Annelies Nelck was born on 26 July 1925, in Nice, France, to Dutch parents from Holland (now the Netherlands). She was raised in the small town of Vence in Provence-Alpes-Côte d'Azur region in Southeastern France. She later gave herself the artist name "Anatole".

In 1938, Nelck moved to studied at Rijksakademie van beeldende kunsten (State Academy of Fine Arts) in Amsterdam.

While living in Amsterdam, Annelies married Jewish music student Ernst Katan in 1943, and together they had one son, Serge Katan (born 1943). Katan was part of the Dutch resistance, and tried to join Nelck in France but was intercepted and sent to Kamp Amersfoort in 1943. He was murdered by the German Nazis on September 1944.

== Career ==
Nelck and her son returned to France in 1943, and she started working for Henri Matisse as his assistant and model. She was the model for Matisse's paintings and drawings, including Tulipes jaunes, fond de violet (1944), Annelies, tulipes et anémones (1944), and Lectrice à la table jaune (1944). She continued to work for Matisse until 1946.

From 1947 to 1967, Nelck was married to the sculptor and painter Jean Vincent de Crozals, ending in divorce. De Crozal also worked as a model for Matisse.

Nelck belonged to the circle of the "Galerie Les Mages" founded by Alphonse Chave in Vence, and associated with artists such as Jean Dubuffet, Henri Laurens, Marc Chagall, and Pierre Bonnard. In 1950 she was invited to take part in Les Mains Éblouies exhibition at the Galerie Maeght in Paris.

In 1954, she designed a stained glass window 10.5 metres (34 ft) x 2.7 metres (8 ft 10 in) for the Anne Frank Secondary School in Düsseldorf, Germany which was restored in 2012.

== Late life, death, and legacy ==
In 2011 she moved to Nexon, France where she remained for the last three years of her life. She died on the 22 August 2014 in Nexon.

Her work can be found in museum collections, including at the Pushkin Museum in Moscow, Russia; and at the Musée de l'Art Brut in Lausanne, Switzerland.

== See also ==
- Lydia Delectorskaya
