= Jean-Baptiste Surian =

French bishop (1670–1754)

Jean-Baptiste Surian (20 September 1670, Saint-Chamas – 3 August 1754) was a French Oratorian and preacher who became bishop of Vence. He was elected to the Académie française in 1733.

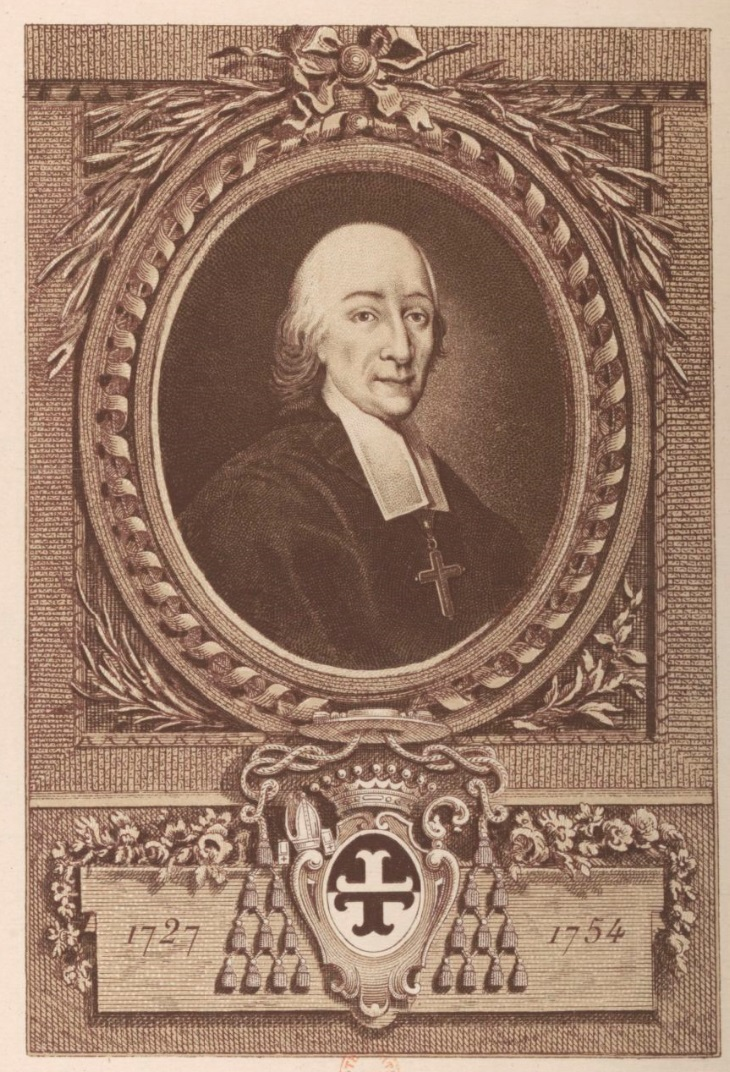
Jean-Baptiste de Surian

== History/Life Events ==
Date	Age	Event	Title
20 Sept 1670		Born	Saint-Chamans
2 Apr 1695	24	Ordained Priest	Priest
29 Dec 1727	57	Selected	Bishop of Vence, France
24 Apr 1728	57	Confirmed	Bishop of Vence, France
13 Jun 1728	58	Ordained Bishop	Bishop of Vence, France
3 Aug 1754	84	Died	Bishop of Vence, France

== Sources ==
http://www.catholic-hierarchy.org/bishop/bsurian.html
