= François de Dinteville =

- Bishop of Auxerre
- Church: Catholic Church
- Diocese: Diocese of Auxerre
- In office: 6 March 1514 – c. 1529
- Predecessor: Jean III Baillet
- Successor: François II de Dinteville
- Previous post: Bishop of Sisteron (1506-1514)

Personal details
- Born: 1477
- Died: 29 April 1530 (aged 52–53)

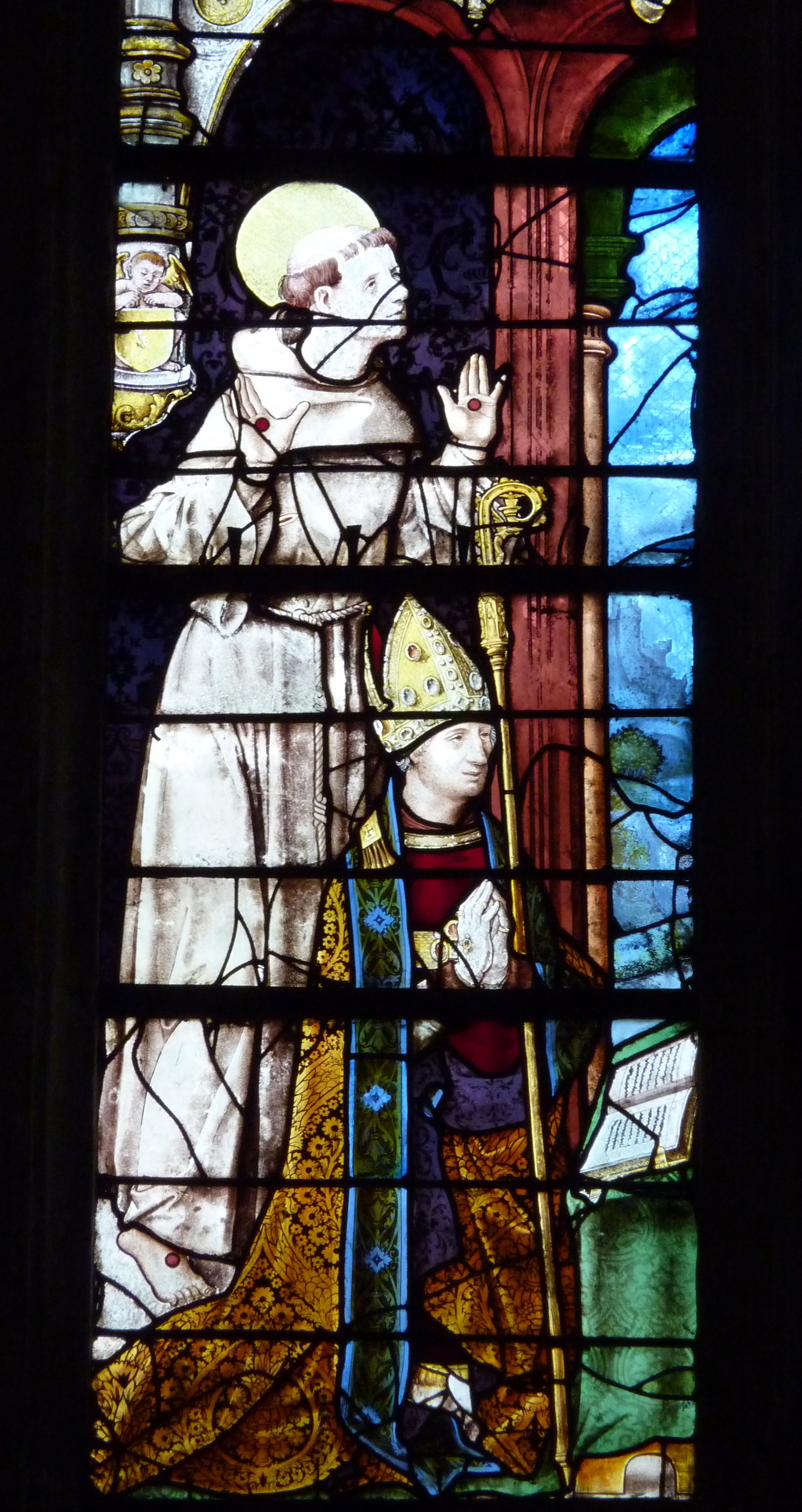
Cutout of the leaded glass window No. 9 (16. Century) in the Catholic parish church of Saint-Martin (Collégiale Saint-Martin) in Montmorency, representation: St. Franz of Assisi and the founder (kneeling) François de Dinteville, Bishop of Auxerre (see: Dominique Foussard, Charles Huet, Mathieu Lours: Églises du Val-d'Oise. Pays de France, Vallée de Montmorency, Société d'Histoire et d'Archeologie de Gonesse et du Pays de France, 2. Edition, Gonesse 2011, ISBN 978-2-9531554-2-6)

François de Dinteville (1477–1530) was a French nobleman who was elected as Bishop of Sisteron and later Bishop of Auxerre.

== Biography ==
After a legal training in Pavia as doctor of both laws, he became Bishop of Sisteron in 1507. He was Bishop of Auxerre from 1513 to his death. The Hours of François de Dinteville (1525) were acquired by the British Museum in 1852 and are now in the British Library.

His successor was another François de Dinteville (1498-1556), his nephew, who had been Bishop of Riez from 1527 to 1530. Dinteville the Younger held the diocese of Auxerre until his death on 27 September 1556.
