= Forcalquier Cathedral =

Former Roman Catholic cathedral and a national monument of France

Coordinates: 43°57′34″N 5°46′52″E

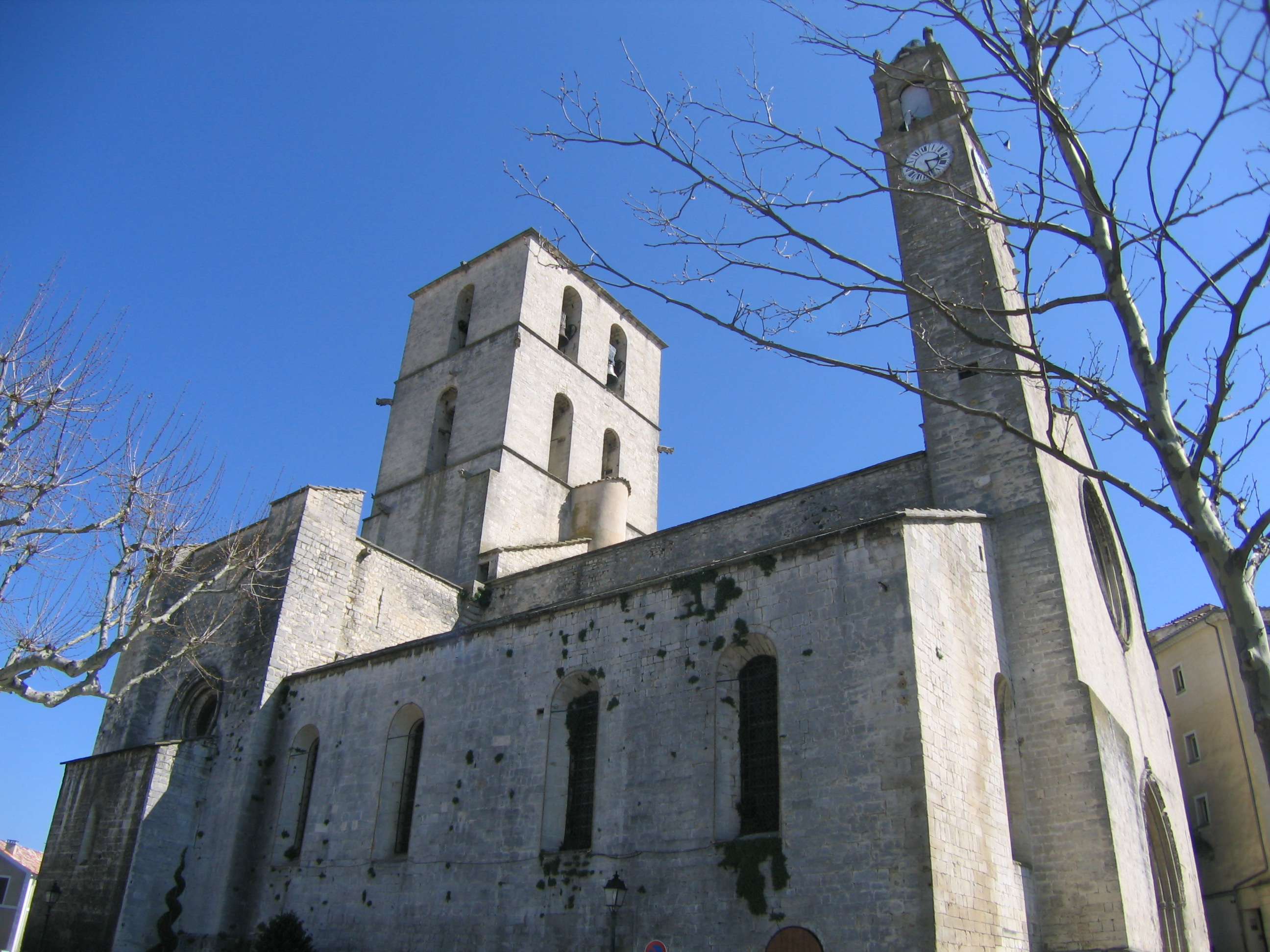
Forcalquier Cathedral

Forcalquier Cathedral, now the Church of Notre-Dame-du-Bourguet (French: Concathédrale Notre-Dame-du-Bourguet de Forcalquier; Église Notre-Dame-du-Bourguet), is a former Roman Catholic cathedral, and a national monument of France, located in the town of Forcalquier, Alpes-de-Haute-Provence.

Erected in the 12th century as a collegiate church, the cathedral of Forcalquier became a second seat of the Bishop of Sisteron in 1408, and for that reason is referred to as a co-cathedral. The diocese of Sisteron was abolished in 1801, after which the cathedral continued as a parish church.

The nave, the choir, the transept and the cloister date from the early 13th century, representing one of the first examples of Gothic style in southern France. The bell tower is from the 16th century. The church houses a panel of the Triumph of Christ by Pierre Mignard.
