= Salvian =

Writer from Roman Gaul

Salvian (or Salvianus) was a Christian writer of the 5th century in Roman Gaul.

== Personal life ==
Salvian's birthplace is uncertain, but some scholars have suggested Cologne or Trier some time between 400 and 405. He was educated at the school of Trier and seems to have been brought up as a Christian. His writings appear to show that he had made a special study of the law; and this is the more likely as he appears to have been of noble birth and could describe one of his relations as being "of no small account in her own district and not obscure in family". He was certainly a Christian when he married Palladia, the daughter of pagan parents, Hypatius and Quieta, whose displeasure he incurred by persuading his wife to retire with him to a distant monastery, which is almost certainly that founded by St Honoratus at Lerins. For seven years there was no communication between the two branches of the family, till at last, when Hypatius had become a Christian, Salvian wrote him a most touching letter in his own name, his wife's, and that of his little daughter Auspiciola, begging for the renewal of the old affection. This whole letter is a most curious illustration of Salvian's reproach against his age that the noblest man at once forfeited all esteem if he became a monk.

It was presumably at Lerins that Salvian made the acquaintance of Honoratus (died 429), Hilary of Arles (died 449), and Eucherius of Lyon (died 449). That he was a friend of the former and wrote an account of his life we learn from Hilary. To Eucherius's two sons, Salonius and Veranus, he acted as tutor in consort with Vincent of Lérins. As he succeeded Honoratus and Hilary in this office, this date cannot well be later than the year 426 or 427, when the former was called to Arles, whither he seems to have summoned Hilary before his death in 429.

== Later work ==
Salvian continued his friendly intercourse with both father and sons long after the latter had left his care; it was to Salonius (then a bishop) that he wrote his explanatory letter just after the publication of his treatise Ad ecclesiam; and to the same prelate a few years later he dedicated his great work, the De gubernatione Dei ("The Government of God"). If French scholars are right in assigning Hilary's Vita Honorati to 430, Salvian, who is there called a priest, had probably already left Lyons for Marseille, where he is known to have spent the last years of his life (Gennadius, ap. Migne, lviii. 1099). It was probably from Marseille that he wrote his first letter — presumably to Lerins — begging the community there to receive his kinsman, the son of a widow of Cologne, who had been reduced to poverty by the barbarian invasions. It seems a fair inference that Salvian had divested himself of all his property in favour of that society and sent his relative to Lerins for assistance (Ep. i., with which compare Ad eccles. ii. 9, 10; iii. 5). It has been conjectured that Salvian paid a visit to Carthage; but this is a mere inference based on the minute details he gives of the state of this city just before its fall to the Vandals (De gub. vii. viii). He seems to have been still living at Marseille when Gennadius wrote under the papacy of Gelasius (492–496).

== Accounts of the fall of the Roman Empire ==
Of Salvian's writings there are still extant two treatises, entitled respectively De gubernatione Dei (more correctly De praesenti judicio) and Ad ecclesiam, and a series of nine letters. Several works mentioned by Gennadius, notably a poem "in morem Graecorum" on the six days of creation (hexaemeron), and certain homilies composed for bishops, are now lost (Genn. 67).

=== De gubernatione Dei (De praesenti judicio) ===
De gubernatione Dei (On the Governance of God) has been considered Salvian's greatest work. Peter Brown described it as ‘the most vivid and by far the best-known commentary on the state of the Roman Empire in the 430s and 440s’. It was published after the capture of Litorius at Toulouse (439), to which he plainly alludes in vii.40. and after the Vandal conquest of Carthage in the same year (vi. 12), but before Attila's invasion (451), as Salvian speaks of the Huns, not as enemies of the empire, but as serving in the Roman armies (vii. 9). The words "proximum bellum" seem to denote a year very soon after 439.

In the eight surviving volumes, Salvian furnishes a valuable if prejudiced description of life in 5th century Gaul. He deals with the same problem that had moved the eloquence of Augustine and Orosius: why were these miseries falling on the empire? Could it be, as the pagans said, because the age had forsaken its old gods? Or was it, as the semi-pagan creed of some Christians taught, that God did not constantly overrule the world he had created (i. 1)? With the former Salvian will not argue (iii. 1). To the latter he replies by asserting that "just as the navigating steersman never loses the helm, so does God never remove his care from the world". Hence the title of the treatise.

In books i. and ii. Salvian sets himself to prove God's constant guidance, first by the facts of Scripture history, and secondly by the enumeration of special texts declaring this truth. Having thus "laid the foundations" of his work, he declares in book iii. that the misery of the Roman world is all due to the neglect of God's commandments and the terrible sins of every class of society. It is not merely that the slaves are thieves and runaways, wine-bibbers and gluttons - the rich are worse (iv. 3). It is their harshness and greed that drive the poor to join the Bagaudae and fly for shelter to the barbarian invaders (v. 5 and 6). Everywhere the taxes are heaped upon the needy, while the rich, who have the apportioning of the impost, escape comparatively free (v. 7). The great towns are wholly given up to the abominations of the circus and the theatre, where decency is wholly set at nought, and Minerva, Mars, Neptune and the old gods are still worshipped (vi. 11; cf. vi. 2 and viii. 2).

Treves was almost destroyed by the barbarians; yet the first petition of its few surviving nobles was that the emperor would re-establish the circus games as a remedy for the ruined city (vi. 15). And this was the prayer of Christians, whose baptismal oath pledged them to renounce "the devil and his works ... the pomps and shows (spectacula)" of this wicked world (vi. 6). Darker still were the iniquities of Carthage, surpassing even the unconcealed licentiousness of Gaul and Spain (iv. 5); and more fearful to Salvian than all else was it to hear men swear "by Christ" that they would commit a crime (iv. 15). It would be the atheist's strongest argument if God left such a state of society unpunished (iv. 12) - especially among Christians, whose sin, since they alone had the Scriptures, was worse than that of barbarians, even if equally wicked, would be (v. 2). But, as a matter of fact, the latter had at least some shining virtues mingled with their vices, whereas the Romans were wholly corrupt (vii. 15, iv. 14).

With this iniquity of the Romans Salvian contrasts the chastity of the Vandals, the piety of the Goths, and the ruder virtues of the Franks, the Saxons, and the other tribes to whom, though heretic Arians or unbelievers, God is giving in reward the inheritance of the empire (vii. 9, II, 21). It is curious that Salvian shows no such hatred of the heterodox barbarians as was rife in Gaul seventy years later. It is difficult to credit the universal wickedness adduced by Salvian, especially in face of the contemporary testimony of Symmachus, Ausonius and Sidonius Apollinaris.

=== Ad ecclesiam ===
Ad ecclesiam is explained by its common title, Contra avaritiam (Against Avarice). It strongly commends meritorious almsgiving to the church. It is quoted more than once in the De gubernatione. Salvian published it under the name of Timothy, and explained his motives for so doing in a letter to his old pupil, Bishop Salonius (Ep. ix.).

This work is chiefly remarkable because in some places it seems to recommend parents not to bequeath anything to their children, on the plea that it is better for the children to suffer want in this world than that their parents should be damned in the next (iii. 4). Salvian is very clear on the duty of absolute self-denial in the case of sacred virgins, priests and monks (ii. 8–10).

== Editions ==
The Ad ecclesiam was first printed in Sichard's Antidoton (Basel, 1528); the De gubernatione by Brassican (Basel, 1530). The two appeared in one volume at Paris in 1575. Pithoeus added variae lectiones and the first seven letters (Paris, 1580); Ritterhusius made various conjectural emendations (Altorf, 1611), and Baluze many more based on manuscript authority (Paris, 1663–1669).

Numerous other editions appeared from the 16th to the 18th century, all of which are now superseded by those of Karl Felix Halm (Berlin, 1877) and F. Pauly (Vienna, 1883).

The two oldest manuscripts of the De gubernatione belong to the 10th century (Cod. Paris, No. 13,385) and the 13th (Brussels, 10,628); of the Ad ecclesiam to the 10th (Paris, 2172) and the 11th (Paris, 2785); of Epistle IX to the 9th (Paris, 2785); of Epistle VIII. to the 7th or 8th century (Paris, 95,559) and to the 9th or 10th century (Paris, 12,237, 12,236). Of the first seven epistles there is only one manuscript extant, of which one part is now at Bern (No. 219), the other at Paris (No. 3791). See Histoire littéraire de France, vol. ii.; Zschimmer's Salvianus (Halle, 1875).

Salvian's works are reprinted (after Baluze) in Migne's Cursus patrologiae, ser. lat. vol. liii. For bibliography, see T. G. Schoenemann's Bibliotheca patrum (ii. 823), and the prefaces to the editions of C. Halm (Monum. Germ., 1877) and F. Pauly (Vienna, Corp. scr. eccl. Lat., 1883).

Gennadius, Hilary and Eucherius may be consulted in Migne, vols. lviii. and I. See also Samuel Dill, Roman Society in the Last Century of the Western Empire, pp. 115–120.
