= Chapelle du Rosaire de Vence =

Chapel in Vence, France, designed by Henri Y Matisse

Coordinates: 43°43′39″N 7°6′46″E

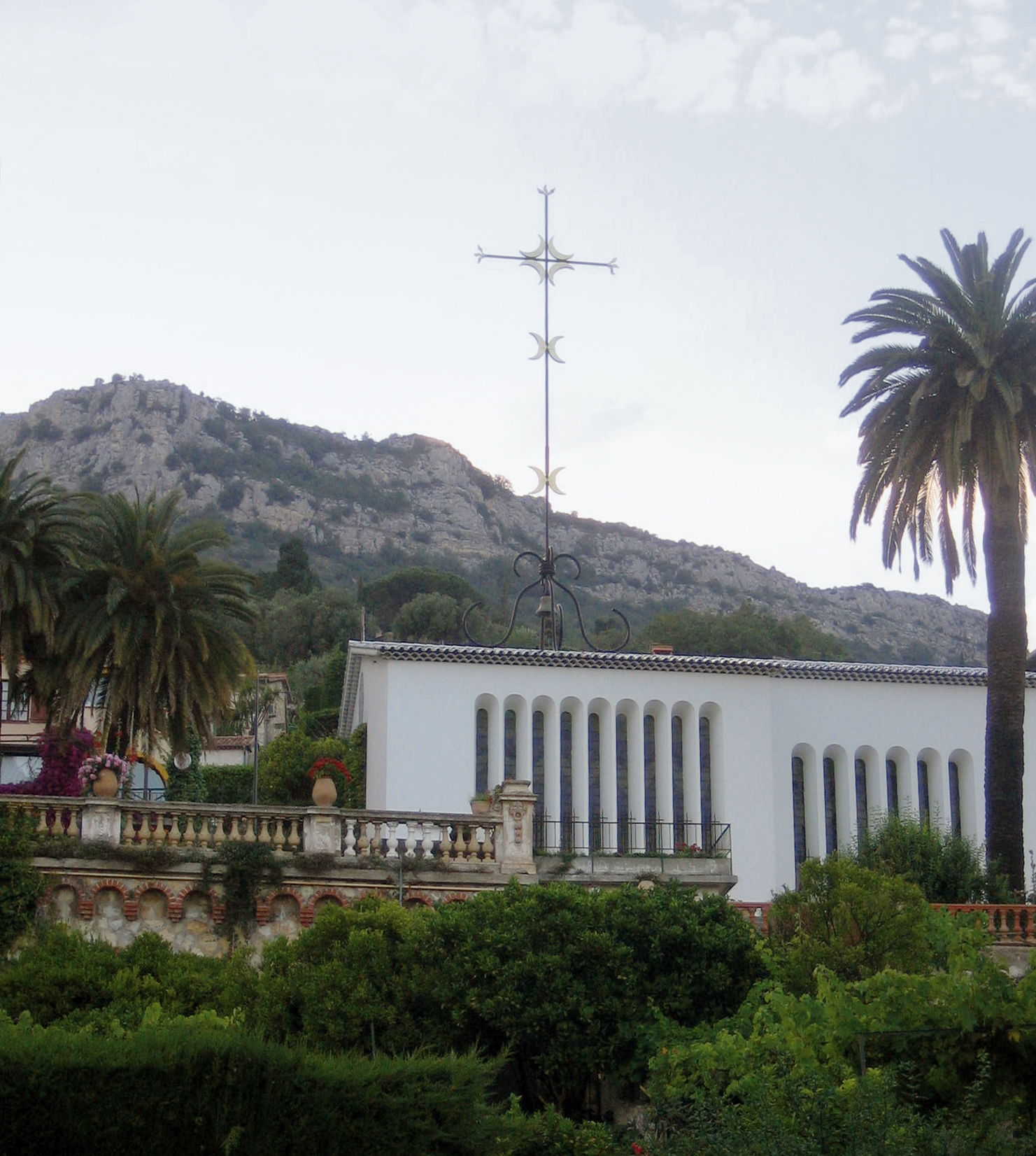
The Matisse Chapel.

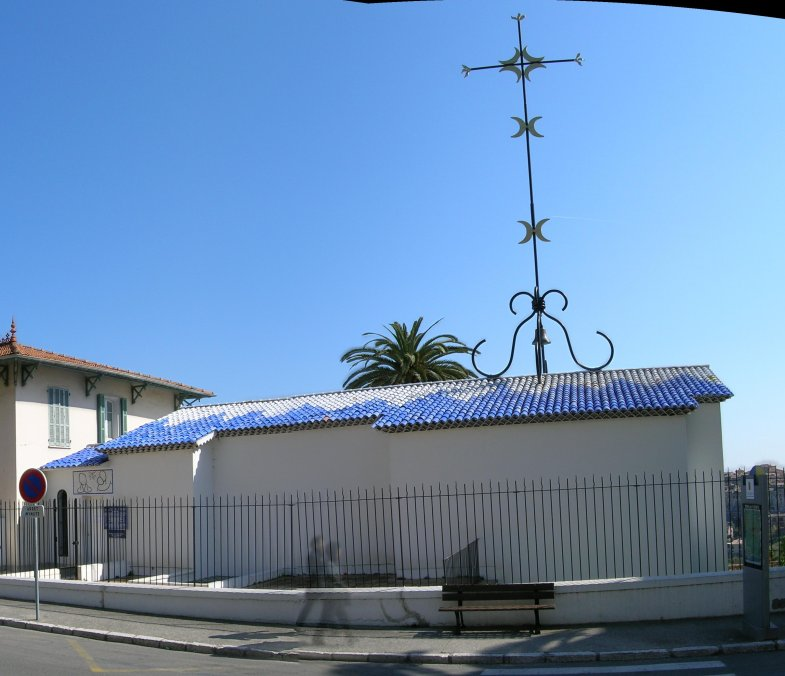
The Matisse Chapel. The entrance is at the left.

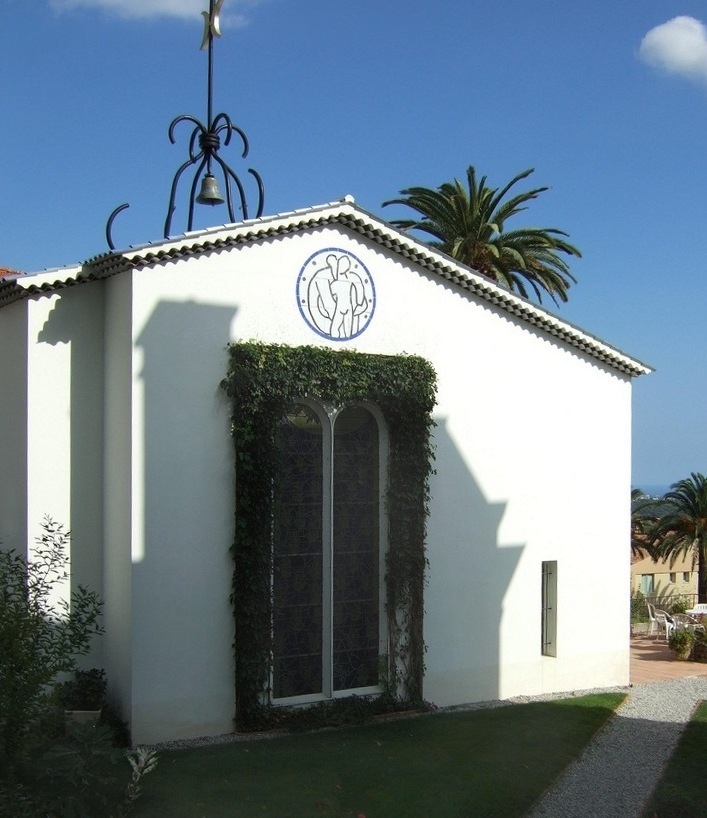
Sideview

The Chapelle du Rosaire de Vence (Chapel of the Rosary), often referred to as the Matisse Chapel or the Vence Chapel, is a small Catholic chapel located in the town of Vence on the French Riviera. It was dedicated to the Dominican Order. The church was built and decorated between 1947 and 1951 under a plan devised by the artist Henri Matisse.

It houses a number of Matisse original works and was regarded by Matisse as his "masterpiece". While the simple white exterior has drawn mixed reviews from casual observers, some regard it as one of the great religious structures of the 20th century.

== Background ==
In 1941, Matisse, who lived most of the year in Nice in the south of France, developed cancer and underwent surgery. During the long recovery, he was particularly helped by a young part-time nurse, Monique Bourgeois, who had answered his advertisement seeking "a young and pretty nurse". Matisse asked her to pose for him, which she did for several drawings and paintings. In 1943, Bourgeois entered the Dominican convent in Vence, a nearby town, and became Sister Jacques-Marie. Matisse eventually bought a home at Vence, not far from the convent where the young nun was stationed. She visited him and told him of the plans the Dominicans had to build a chapel beside the girls' high school which they operated in Vence.

She asked Matisse if he would help with the design of the chapel. He had never done anything like it, but Matisse agreed to help, beginning in 1947. Father Marie-Alain Couturier, who collaborated on several artistic Catholic churches after World War II, was also involved in the project. At the age of 77, Matisse began the project and spent more than four years working on the chapel, its architecture, stained-glass windows, interior murals and ceramics, liturgical furnishings, and the priests' vestments. While Matisse had been baptized a Catholic, he had not practiced the religion for many years.

The story of the friendship and collaboration of Matisse and Sister Jacques Marie is related in her 1992 book, Henri Matisse: La Chapelle de Vence (ISBN 2909767000) and in the 2003 documentary Model for Matisse. Sister Jacques Marie died in 2004, aged 84.

== Architecture ==
The chapel is built on a hillside and is entered by descending a flight of stairs, and turning to the right. The chapel is in an L shape, with the longer portion directly inside the door. The altar is placed at an angle where the two legs of the L join. The chapel is 15 meters long by 6 meters wide. The longer/larger segment is for the students or townspeople; the shorter section was for the nuns who lived and taught at the school. Both sides face the altar.

== Furnishings ==
The altar is made of warm brown stone, chosen for its resemblance to the color of bread and the Eucharist. Matisse also designed the bronze crucifix on the altar, the candle holders in bronze, and the small tabernacle. The wrought iron candle holder with a flame always burning and hanging from the ceiling was made by local craftsmen who have a special tradition of making wrought iron.

== Stained-glass windows by Matisse ==
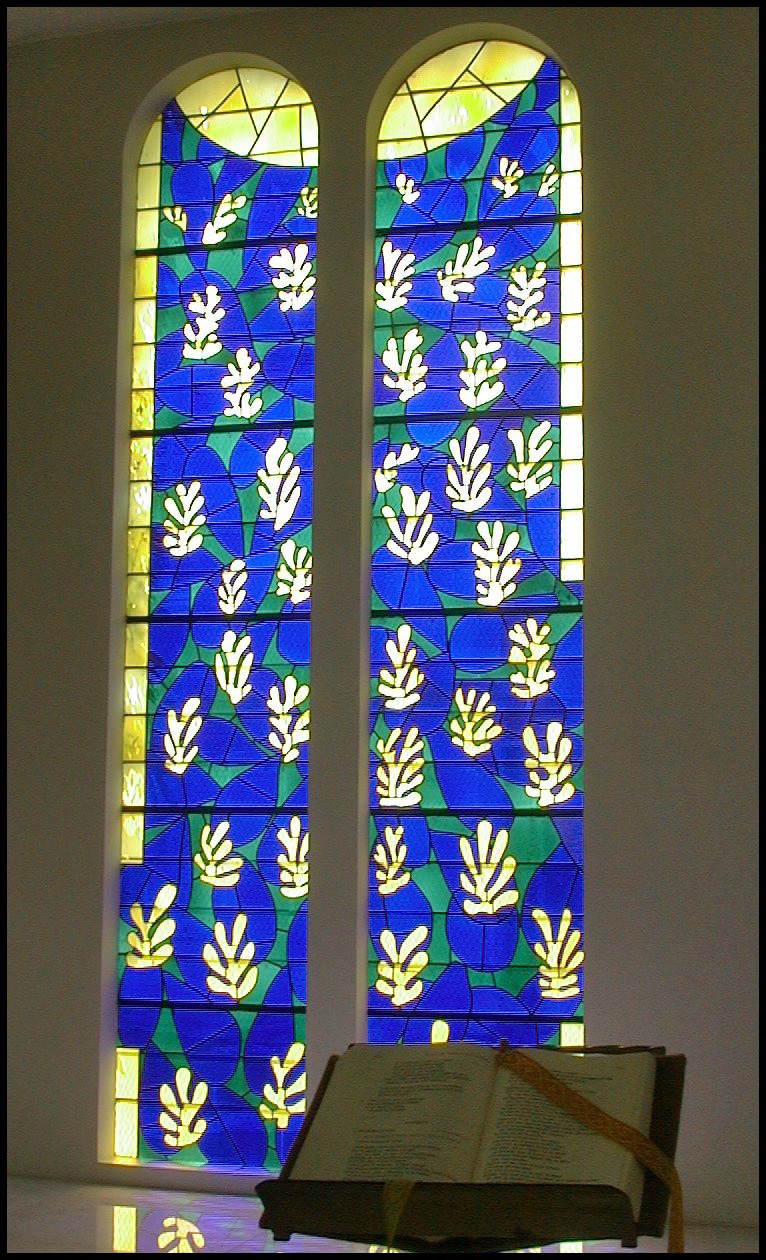
Stained-glass windows by Matisse

There are three sets of stained-glass windows, upon which Matisse spent a great deal of time. All three sets make use of just three colors: an intense yellow for the sun, an intense green for vegetation and cactus forms, and a vivid blue for the Mediterranean Sea, the Riviera sky and the Madonna. The two windows beside the altar are named the Tree of Life, but the forms are abstract. The color from the windows floods the chapel's interior, which is otherwise all white.

== Three murals ==
For the walls, Matisse designed three murals to be made by painting white tiles with black paint and then firing the large sections of tile. Each tile measures 12 in.^{2}. Matisse's mobility was limited due to illness and disability which meant he could only work from a wheelchair, and he had a long stick with a brush strapped to his arm and pieces of construction paper placed on the wall. He then drew the images, which were transferred to tiles by skilled craftsmen.

=== Saint Dominic ===
Behind the altar there is a large image of Saint Dominic, founder of the Order of Preachers and by tradition founder of the practice of the rosary for Catholics. He was a 13th-century wandering preacher from Spain. His followers wear a white garment, or habit, with a white scapular hanging straight down the front. Simple but powerful lines were created by Matisse to depict the saint.

=== Virgin and Child ===
On the side wall there are abstract images of flowers and an image of the Madonna and Child, all created in black outlines on the white tiles. Rather than clasping the child to herself, as she is usually depicted, Matisse chose to show Mary offering her son to the world.

=== Stations of the cross ===
On the back wall of the chapel there are traditional 14 stations of the cross. Although the 14 stations are usually depicted individually, Matisse incorporated all of them on one wall in one cohesive composition. The series begins at the bottom left as Jesus is brought before Pilate and condemned. The stations follow Jesus' progress carrying the cross. At the top in the center are the three most powerful images – The Raising of the Cross with Jesus' body nailed to it, the actual Crucifixion, and then Taking the Body of Jesus Down. The center panel has a straight vertical and horizontal composition, while the two surrounding stations have strong diagonal lines leading to the head of Jesus on the cross. The French artist Jean Vincent de Crozals served Matisse as model for the Christ.

== Sets of vestments ==
Matisse designed the priests' vestments for the chapel, using the traditional ecclesiastical colors of the religious seasons: purple, black, rose, green, and red. Pope Pius XII requested that the nuns send the vestments to Rome to be put in the Vatican's new museum of modern religious art. The nuns made copies of five of the sets of vestments, including chasubles, maniples, stoles, and chalice veils, and sent them to Rome.

== Remaining area ==
The outside of the chapel is white. The top of the roof is decorated with a blue-and-white zigzag pattern and carries an elaborate metal cross with a bell.

There is a small gift shop associated with the chapel; income goes to support the nuns and the chapel. There are also two doors in carved wood, designed by Matisse, for the confessionals. Along the hallway to the gift shop are photos of Matisse designing the chapel. There are also some of Matisse's original sketches for the Stations and vestments.

Maquettes for the vestments, as well as for a number never realized, were made by Matisse on brown wrapping paper and black construction paper. They can be seen in the Pompidou Center in Paris.

The high school has been closed and only a few elderly nuns still live there.

== See also ==
- Vence Cathedral
- List of works by Henri Matisse
