= Salonius =

Bishop of Genève, Swiss saint

Saint Salonius of Geneva

Bishop and Confessor
- Born: c. 400; Lyon, France
- Died: 28 September 475; Geneva, Switzerland
- Venerated in: Catholic Church
- Canonized: Pre-Congregation
- Feast: 28 September
- Attributes: Bishop vestment Miter; Crosier
- Patronage: Lyon

Salonius (c. 400 – 28 September 475) known as Salonius of Geneva was a confessor and bishop of the 5th century. He was a son of Eucherius of Lyon and Galla. He was educated at Lérins Abbey, first by Hilary of Arles, then by Salvianus and Vincent of Lérins. In 440, he was elected bishop of Geneva and, as such, took part in the Synod of Orange (441), the Synod of Vaison (442), and the Synod of Arles in 451. He has also been listed as the bishop of Genoa, but it is not clear if this was a later appointment or if the word Geneva was incorrectly written as Genova. He was an accomplished Latin ecclesiastical writer. Most notably, he composed mystical and allegorical interpretations of the Proverbs and Ecclesiastes. His feast day is 28 September.

His brother was Veranus of Vence.
