= La Blouse Roumaine =

1940 painting by Henri Matisse

- The Romanian Blouse (English)
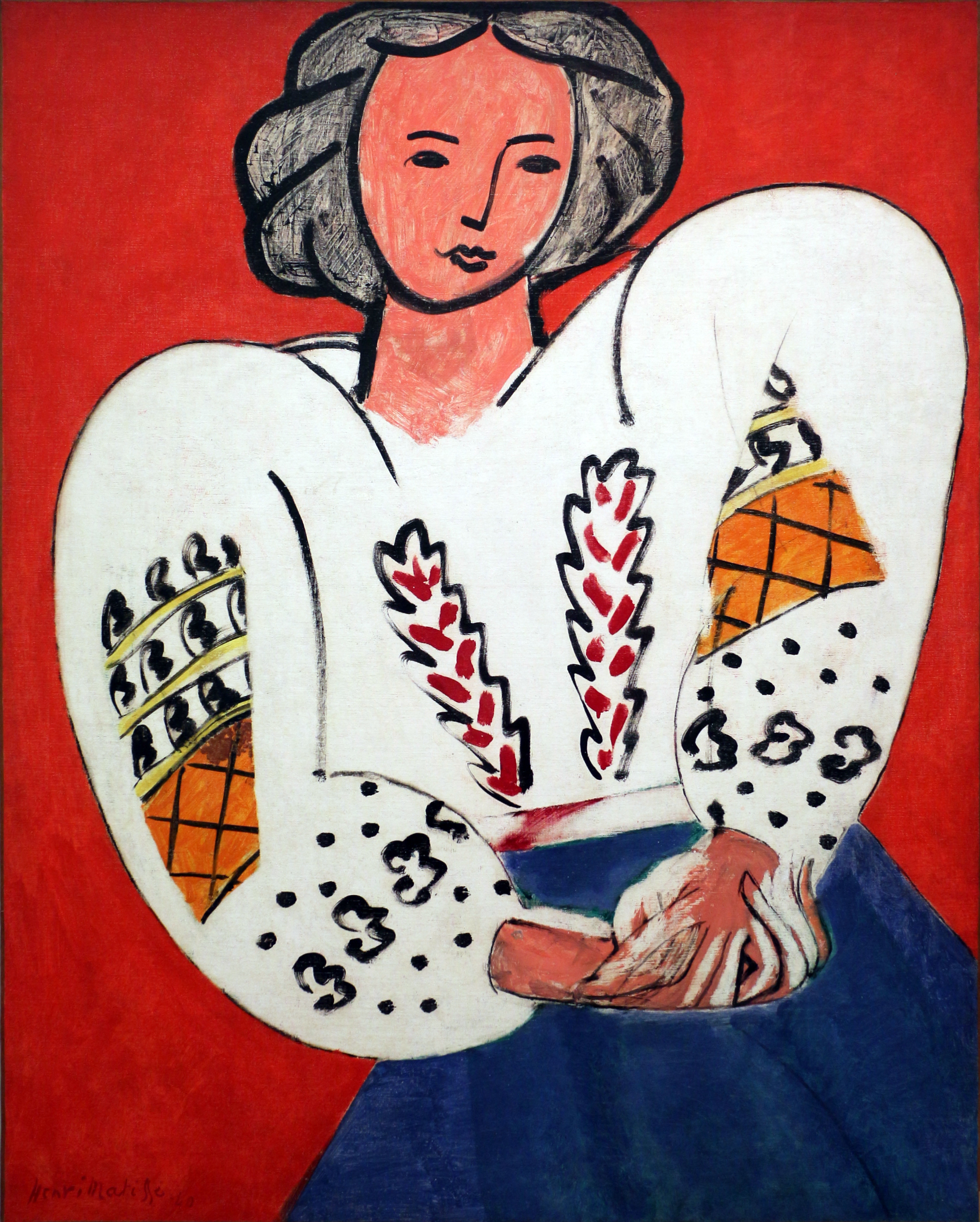
- Artist: Henri Matisse
- Year: April 1940
- Medium: Oil on canvas
- Dimensions: 92 cm × 73 cm (36 in × 29 in)
- Location: Musée National d'Art Moderne, Paris

La Blouse Roumaine (English: The Romanian Blouse) is an oil-on-canvas painting by Henri Matisse from 1940. Measuring 92 × 73 cm, the painting is currently held at the Musée National d'Art Moderne in Paris. It depicts a woman in a blue skirt and a white embroidered blouse.

Although the Centre Pompidou cites Lydia Delectorskaya as the original model, other candidates for the inspiration for the painting include Elvira Popescu, Elena Văcărescu, Anna de Noailles and Marthe Bibesco.

Matisse painted ten versions of La Blouse Romaine from 1939 to 1945. A pen and ink sketch with the same title, with a similar blouse but a different composition, dated in 1937, is in the collection of the Baltimore Museum of Art.

== See also ==
- List of works by Henri Matisse
- Romanian traditional clothing
