= Vence Cathedral =

Cathedral in Vence, France

Coordinates: 43°43′22″N 7°6′50″E

Vence Cathedral Cathédrale de la Nativité-de-Marie de Vence
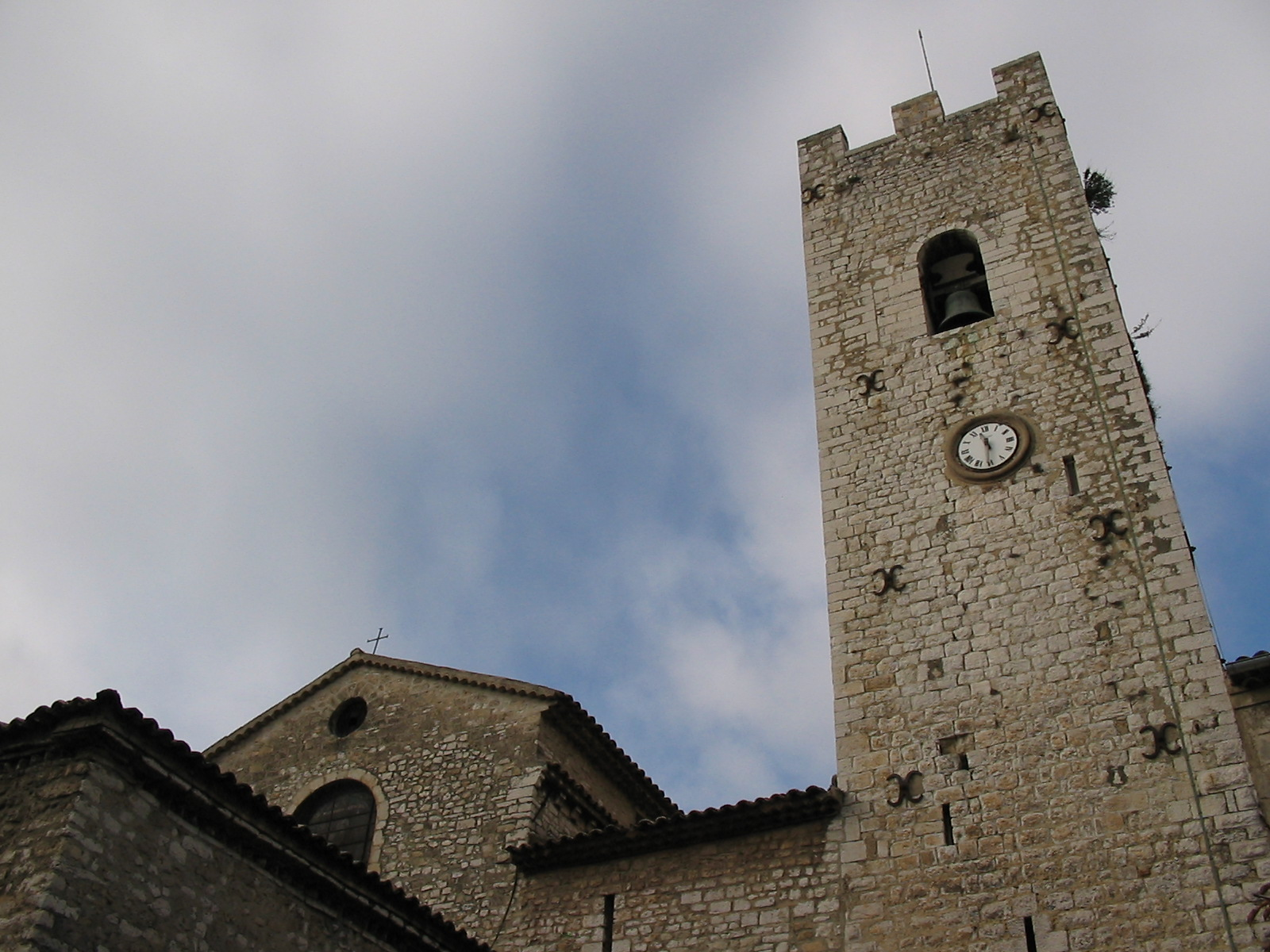
- Bell tower of Vence Cathedral

Religion
- Affiliation: Roman Catholic Church
- Province: Bishopric of Vence
- Region: Alpes-Maritimes
- Rite: Roman
- Ecclesiastical or organisational status: Cathedral
- Status: Active

Location
- Location: Vence, France
- Interactive map of Vence Cathedral; Cathédrale de la Nativité-de-Marie de Vence

Architecture
- Type: church

Vence Cathedral (French: Cathédrale de la Nativité-de-Marie de Vence) is a Roman Catholic church located in the town of Vence, Alpes-Maritimes, France. The cathedral was previously the seat of the Bishopric of Vence, abolished by the Concordat of 1801, when its territory was passed to the Diocese of Nice. The former cathedral, now a parish church, is a national monument.

== See also ==
- Chapelle du Rosaire de Vence
