= Veranus of Vence =

French Roman Catholic saint

Saint Veranus
- Died: 480
- Venerated in: Roman Catholic Church
- Feast: 10 September

Veranus was the fourth Bishop of Vence, Gaul, after a period as a monk.

Veranus was the son of Eucherius of Lyon and his wife Galla. Both he and his brother Salonius were educated at Lérins Abbey, first by Hilary of Arles, then by Salvianus and Vincent of Lérins. His father's Liber formularum spiritalis intelligentiae is addressed to Veranius and is a defence of the lawfulness of reading an allegorical sense in Scripture, bringing to bear the metaphors in Psalms.

Veranus became Bishop of Vence around 442 and served at least until 465. In February 464, Pope Hilarius commissioned Bishop Veranus to warn Mamertus of Vienne that, if in the future he did not refrain from irregular ordinations, (that is, of bishops outside of his diocese) his faculties would be withdrawn. This was to uphold the primatial privileges of the See of Arles as defined by Pope Leo I.

The bishop's date of death is uncertain. His remains lie in a carved sarcophagus in La Cathedrale Notre-Dame de la Nativite de Vence.

The Morgan Library has a Book of Hours from Rouen from about 1525 illuminated with a miniature depicting Bishop Veranus.
