= Eucherius of Lyon =

5th-century Archbishop of Lyon (d. 449)

Saint Eucherius of Lyon
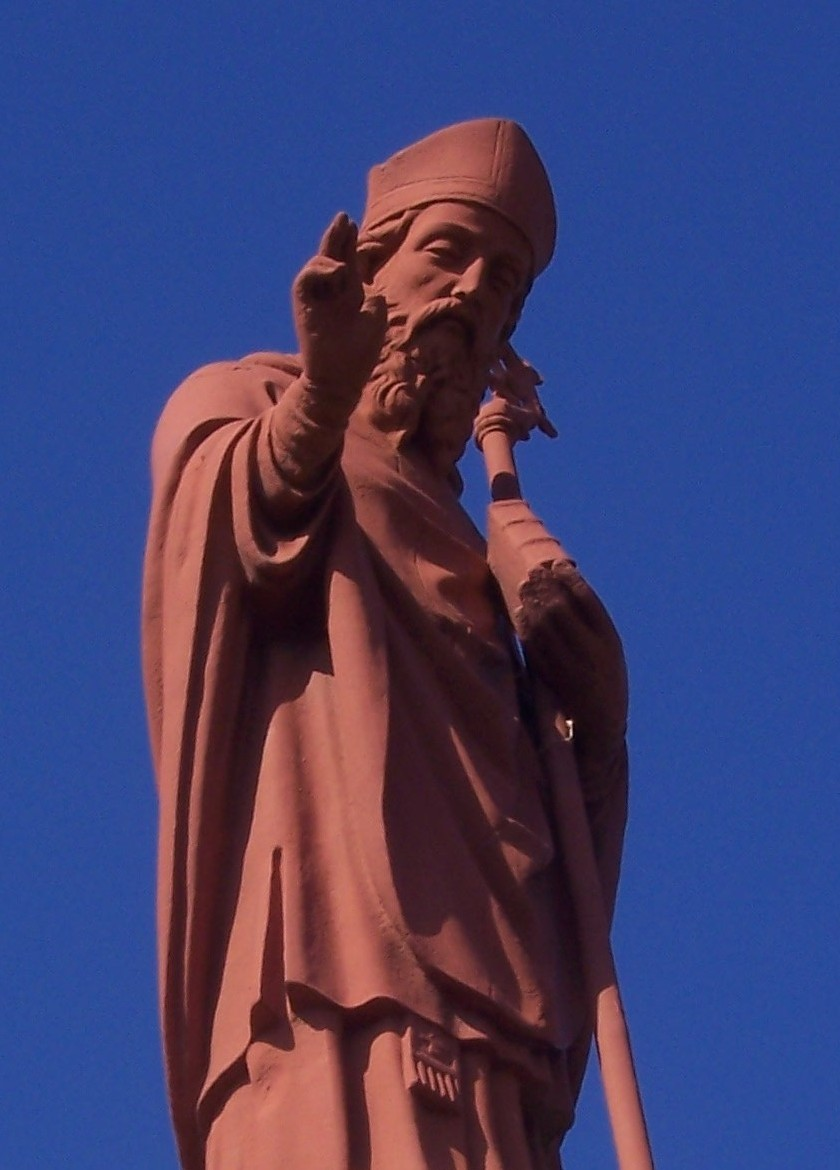
- Statue of Saint Eucherius of Lyon in Beaumont-de-Pertuis

Archbishop of Lyon
- Born: c. 380
- Died: c. 449
- Venerated in: Eastern Orthodox Church; Roman Catholic Church
- Feast: 16 November

Eucherius (c. 380 – c. 449) was a high-born and high-ranking ecclesiastic in the Christian church in Roman Gaul. He is remembered for his letters advocating extreme self-abnegation. From 439, he served as Archbishop of Lyon, and Henry Wace ranked him "the most distinguished occupant of that see" after Irenaeus. He is venerated as a saint within the Eastern Orthodox Church and the Roman Catholic Church.

== Life ==
Eucherius was married to a Gallo-Roman woman named Galla. They had two sons: Veranus and Salonius, who were born c. 400. According to some sources, they also had two daughters, Consortia and Tullia.

After their sons were born, Eucherius suggested that they adopt a more ascetic life together. Galla and Eucherius's marriage evolved to a 'marriage of friendship' like others undertaken by other religious figures such as Paulinus and Therasia of Nola. The family practised "unwealth" - where life was restricted to the minimum in order to support prayer and devotion.

On the death of his wife Galla, as was common in the 5th century, Eucherius withdrew with his sons, Veranus and Salonius, to the monastery of Lérins for a time. Both sons were later sent to visit Paulinus of Nola. There he lived a severely simple life of study, devoting himself to the education of his sons. Soon afterwards he withdrew further, to the neighbouring island of Lerona (now Île Sainte-Marguerite), where he devoted his time to study and mortification of the flesh. With the thought that he might join the anchorites in the deserts of the East, he consulted John Cassian, the famed hermit who had arrived from the East in Marseille. Cassian dedicated the second set of his Collationes (nos. 11–17) to Eucherius and Honoratus, the founder of Lérins. These describe the daily lives of the hermits of the Egyptian Thebaid and discuss the important themes of grace, free will and scripture.

Though imitating the ascetic lifestyle of the Egyptian hermits, Eucherius kept in touch with men renowned for learning and piety: Cassian, Honoratus, Hilary of Arles, Claudianus Mamertus, Agroecius (who dedicated a book to him) and Sidonius Apollinaris. He lived as a hermit inside a cave in present-day Beaumont-de-Pertuis, and his fame as a hermit soon spread throughout the region. The fame of Eucherius was soon so widespread in southeastern Gaul that he was chosen bishop of Lyon. This was probably in 434. It is certain, at least, that he attended the first council of Orange as metropolitan of Lyon in 441, and that he retained this dignity until his death. He was succeeded in the bishopric by his son Veranus, while Salonius became Bishop of Geneva.

== Works ==
Around 428, Eucherius wrote his epistolary essay De laude eremi ("in praise of the desert"), addressed to Hilary of Arles. His Liber formularum spiritalis intelligentiae, addressed to his son Veranus, is a defence of the lawfulness of allegorical readins of the Bible, bringing to bear the metaphors in Psalms and such phrases as "the hand of God." The term anagoge (ἀναγωγὴ) is employed for the application of Scripture to the heavenly Jerusalem to come, and there are other examples of what would become classic medieval hermeneutics. Among Eucherius's other letters are his Institutiones ad Salonium, addressed to his other son, and a letter to Faustus of Lérins describing his pilgrimage to Jerusalem.

Eucherius's Epistola paraenetica ad Valerianum cognatum, de contemptu mundi ("Epistle of exhortation to his kinsman Valerian, On the contempt of the world") is an expression of the despair for the present and future of the world in its last throes shared by many educated men of Late Antiquity, with hope for a world to come. Desiderius Erasmus thought so highly of its Latin style that he edited and published it at Basel (1520).

== Notes ==
Catholic Church titles
Preceded by Sicarius	Archbishop of Lyon c. 434 – c. 449	Succeeded by Patiens
