= Siege of Ascalon (1187) =

1187 Siege

The siege of Ascalon lasted from 23 August to 5 September 1187, when the Crusader-held city surrendered to the Ayyubids. It was the last major action of Saladin's campaign against the Kingdom of Jerusalem before the siege of Jerusalem itself, which began on 25 September.

The purpose of the attack on Ascalon was to clear the path from Jerusalem to Egypt. To this end, Gaza and Darum were also targets. Saladin marched his army from Beirut, which surrendered on 6 August, bypassing Tyre, the strongest Crusader city on the coast. After linking up with his brother al-Adil, he arrived before Ascalon on Sunday, 23 August. He brought with himself two high-profile captives from the battle of Hattin: King Guy of Jerusalem and the Templar grand master Gerard of Ridefort. He offered to free Guy in return for Ascalon's surrender, but this was refused. He then ordered trebuchets set up. These were ready on 25 August.

The History of the Patriarchs of Alexandria includes a letter sent by Saladin announcing his victory at Ascalon and describing in particular the actions of the trebuchets. As a work of propaganda, the letter is not wholly trustworthy. It claims that the trebuchets had opened a breach in the wall by the second day, 26 August. Resistance was initially stiff. Saladin had Guy try to convince the defenders to surrender on favourable terms, but it had no effect. The work of Saladin's sappers at undermining the city's defences, however, persuaded them to negotiate. After 13 days of siege, Ascalon surrendered. The garrison departed in freedom with their property. A solar eclipse occurred around the same time as the fall of Ascalon, "as if" the sun, wrote the author of the Itinerarium Peregrinorum, were "in sympathy" with the defenders. On 20 September, Saladin encamped west of Jerusalem.

Following the surrender of Ascalon, the Templars surrendered Gaza, Toron and Gibelin in return for the liberation their grand master. In the summer of 1188, Queen Sibylla wrote to Saladin asking for her husband's release on the grounds that it had been agreed as part of the surrender of Ascalon. Saladin complied, but imposed further terms on Guy's release. Gerard of Ridefort was also finally released at this time. In 1191, Saladin razed the defences of Ascalon because he could not hold it.

== Bibliography ==
- Eddé, Anne-Marie (2011) [2008]. Saladin. Translated by Jane Marie Todd. Belknap Press.
- Fulton, Michael S. (2018). Artillery in the Era of the Crusades: Siege Warfare and the Development of Trebuchet Technology. Brill.
- Fulton, Michael S. (2020). Siege Warfare During the Crusades. Pen & Sword.
- Lyons, M. C.; Jackson, D. E. P. (1982). Saladin: The Politics of the Holy War. Cambridge University Press.
- Möhring, Hannes (2008) [2005]. Saladin: The Sultan and His Times, 1138–1193. Translated by David S. Bachrach. Johns Hopkins University Press.
- Phillips, Jonathan (2019). The Life and Legend of the Sultan Saladin. Yale University Press.
