= Council of Avignon =

Council of Avignon may refer to one of a number of councils of the Roman Catholic Church which were held in Avignon in France. The first reported council met in the 11th century and the final council on record was in the mid-19th century.

== Eleventh century ==
The first reported council, Council of Avignon (1060), was held in 1060, though nothing is known about what took place.

In 1080 a council, Council of Avignon (1080), was held under the presidency of Hugues de Dié, papal legate, in which Aicard, usurper of the See of Arles, was deposed, and Gibelin put in his place. Three bishops-elect (Lautelin of Embrun, Hugues of Grenoble, Didier of Cavaillon) accompanied the legate to Rome and were consecrated there by Pope Gregory VII.

== Thirteenth century ==
During the 13th century four councils were held, including the Council of Avignon (1209) in which the inhabitants of Toulouse were excommunicated by the council for failing to expel the Albigensian heretics from Toulouse. Included in the population that was excommunicated were two papal legates, four archbishops and twenty bishops. The next council was held in 1270, and Bertrand de Malferrat, Archbishop of Arles presided over the council. The usurpers of ecclesiastical property were severely threatened; unclaimed legacies were allotted to pious uses; the bishops were urged to mutually support one another; and individual churches were taxed for the support of the papal legates; and ecclesiastics were forbidden to convoke the civil courts against their bishops.

During the Council of Avignon (1279) they were concerned with the clergy's protection of rights, privileges, and immunities. Provisions were also made for those who promised to join the crusade Gregory X had ordered, but had failed to actually go on the crusade. In addition the council decreed that to hear confessions monks must have permission of their ordinary, or bishop, as well as their superior. The last council during the 13th century was the Council of Avignon (1282) , during which they published 10 canons. Among the canons published was one urging people to more regularly attend the parochial churches, and to go to their parish church for at least feast days and on Sundays.

== Fourteenth century ==
The temporalities of the Church and ecclesiastical jurisdiction occupied the attention of the Council of Avignon (1327) . The seventy-nine canons of the Council of Avignon (1337) are renewed from earlier councils, and emphasize the duty of Easter Communion in one's own parish church, and of abstinence on Saturday for beneficed persons and ecclesiastics, in honour of the Blessed Virgin, a practice begun three centuries earlier on the occasion of the Truce of God, but no longer universal.

== Fifteenth century ==
The 15th century saw two councils convened, one in 1457 and one in 1497. The 1457 council was held by Cardinal de Foix, Archbishop of Arles and legate of Avignon, who was also a Franciscan. His primary reason was to promote the doctrine of Immaculate Conception, in sense of the declaration of the council of Basle. They forbade the preaching of the contrary doctrine, as well as 64 disciplinary canons that were published, in keeping with the legislation of previous councils. In 1497 Archbishop Francesco Tarpugi (after the council he was cardinal) presided over the council. They published a similar number of decrees to the 1457 council. It was decreed that the sponsors of the newly confirmed were not obligated to make presents to their parents or to them. They also decreed that before the relics of the saints two candles were to be kept lit at all times.

== Later Councils ==
During the next five centuries only six further councils were held. The 1509 council focused on disciplinary measures. The next council, in 1596, was called to discuss the furthering of the observance of the decrees of the Council of Trent, and the 1609 council was held for very similar circumstances. The councils of 1664 and 1725 were held to formulate disciplinary decrees. The 1725 council also decreed the duty of adhering to the Papal Bull Unigenitus (1713) of Clement XI that condemned the Oratorian, Pasquier Quesnel. The final council on record was in 1849 and it published ten chapters of canons concerning discipline and faith.
