= Theodosius of Arles =

Archbishop of Arles
- In office c. 632–c. 650
- Succeeded by: Johannes I

Theodosius of Arles (or Théodose, Teudosi, Theodoric), was Archbishop of Arles c. 632–650.

== Biography ==
Theodosius appears in the episcopal diptychs. However, very little is known of his life.

He already governed the diocese of Arles when he participated on 12 August 632 in the funeral of Saint Resticula or Resticule, abbess of the Monastery of Saint John, Arles. The Council of Chalon-sur-Saône (647–653) was attended by most of the bishops of Provence, as well as the metropolitans of Lyon, Vienne, Rouen, Sens, Bourges and Besançon. Théodose was summoned but did not attend. Theodosius was accused of several crimes and of misconduct. He was suspended from all episcopal functions in 650. According to H. Clair, Theodosius heard the council's decision condemning him as a heretic in his own cathedral.

According to some, Theodosius then went to Rome where he obtained pardon from Pope Vitalian (657–672) who sent him in penance to preach in England. In a charter dated 664, reported by Scholastique Pitton in the Annals of the Church of Aix, it appears that Theodosius was still bishop of Arles at that date. The date of 664, must be taken with caution because there are acts of his successor, Jean I of Arles, dated 658 and 659. But it is more confused. According to the historian Jean-Pierre Papon, a certain Theodore (and not Theodosius) crowned bishop of Canterbury by Pope Vitalian, would have been received by John I before his departure for England at the earliest around 657. Was this Theodore the Theodosius sent to England for penance?

== Sources ==
- Albanès, Joseph Hyacinthe (1822-1897) (1899–1920), Chevalier, Ulysse (ed.), Gallia christiana novissima. Histoire des archevêchés, évêques et abbayes de France, vol. III, Montbéliard: P. Hoffmann
- Clair, H. (1837), Les monumens d'Arles, antique et moderne (in French), D. Garcin, "En 650, l'archevêque Théodose, déchu de l'administration de son siège, entend lire, dans sa cathédrale, la décision du concile qui le condamne comme hérétique."
- Duchesne, Louis (1907–1910), Fastes épiscopaux de l'ancienne Gaule (in French) (2 ed.), Paris
- Duport, Gilles (1690), Histoire de l'Église d'Arles (in French), "Theodose fut appelé : mais parce qu'il n'y comparut point, on lui ota l'Administration Temporelle & Spirituelle de son Archevêché ... Theodose sçachant cela, s'en alla à Rome, se prosterna aux pieds au pape Vitalien qui lui donna l'Absolution de ses crimes; & pour Pénitence, Sa Sainteté l'envoya prêcher en Angleterre, où l'on croit qu'il mourut, & qu'il répara par son obeïssance & par ses bonnes œuvres, le scandale qu'il avoit donné à l'Eglise par ses crimes & par sa mauvaise vie."
- Gallic Councils 511–680 - Concile de Châlon de 647-653, liste des participants
- Mémoires, Aix-en-Provence, France: Académie des sciences, agriculture, arts et belles-lettres d'Aix, Académie nationale des sciences arts et belles-lettres de Caen, Société des amis des sciences, des lettres, de l’agriculture et des arts, 1827, p. 315, "Une charte de l'année 664, rapportée par Pitton, dans les annales de l'église d'Aix, qui constate la visite faite par Théodose, évêque d'Arles, selon le droit de sa primatie, nous apprend que l'oratoire du très-saint Sauveur était situé non loin du mur de la ville, non procul a muro civitatîs. Nous y trouvons une nouvelle autorité, en faveur de notre système, sur la fixation de la ligne orientale de l'enceinte romaine."
- Papon, Jean-Pierre (1777), Histoire générale de Provence, vol. 1, Moutard, "Jean II (selon la classification de JP Papon) reçut à Arles Théodore, natif de Tarse en Cilicie, et ses compagnons, que le pape Vitellien envoyoit en Angleterre. Théodore avoit été sacré évêque de Cantorbery par le souverain pontife"
- Rouquette, Jean-Maurice, ed. (2008), ARLES, histoire, territoires et cultures (in French), Paris: Imprimerie nationale éditions, ISBN 978-2-7427-5176-1
