= Jean I of Arles =

Archbishop of Arles

Archbishop of Arles
- In office 651–675
- Preceded by: Theodosius
- Succeeded by: Anastasius

Personal details
- Died: 675
- Occupation: Prelate

Jean I (died 675) was an early Archbishop of Arles. Little is known of his life.

== Identification ==
The diptychs point to two successive Johns who could be the same prelate. Moreover, the numbering followed here probably forgets a previous Johannes between Aeon and Césaire at the beginning of the fifth century. Thus, depending on the classification adopted, this archbishop could be called John I, the usual denomination, John II or John III.

== Biography ==
We have little information about the Archbishop John. We know of signatures as witness to documents in 658 and 659. A letter was addressed to the monastery of Sainte-Marie d'Arles around 670. The date of his death was 675. According to the historian Jean-Pierre Papon, he received Theodore, Archbishop of Canterbury. (Note: John II (according to the classification of JP Papon) received in Arles Theodore, native of Tarsus and Cilicia, and his companions, that the Pope Vitellien sent to England. Theodore had been consecrated bishop of Canterbury by the sovereign pontiff.) This happened in 657 at the earliest.

== Sources ==
- Albanès, Joseph Hyacinthe (1899–1920), Gallia christiana novissima. Histoire des archevêchés, évêques et abbayes de France. ARLES (in French), vol. III – via Gallica
- Papon, Jean-Pierre (1777), Histoire générale de Provence (in French), vol. 1, Moutard
- Richard, Charles-Louis (1827), Bibliothèque sacrée, ou Dictionnaire universel historique, dogmatique, canonique, géographique et chronologique des sciences ecclésiastiques (in French), p. 70, "John I is only known by a few subscriptions from 658 and 659. He died in 675."
- Rouquette, Jean-Maurice, ed. (2005), ARLES, histoire, territoires et cultures (in French), ISBN 2742751769
