= Aicard =

French archbishop

- Archbishop of Arles
- Native name: Aicard d'Arles
- See: Arles
- In office: c. 1070 – 1080; 1107 – 1113
- Quashed: 1080
- Predecessor: Raimbaud de Reillanne
- Successor: Ghibbelin (1080); Atton de Bruniquel (1115)

Personal details
- Born: c. 1040
- Died: 1113
- Denomination: Roman Catholic
- Parents: Jaufre I, Viscount of Marseilles; Rixendis of Millau

Aicard of Marseilles (c. 1040 – 1113), also known as Aicard of Arles or simply Aicard, was the Archbishop of Arles from 1070 to 1080 and again from 1107 to his death in 1113.

== Early life and family ==
Aicard was born around 1040, the son of Jaufre I, Viscount of Marseilles, and Rixendis of Millau. The vicecomital family of Marseilles were vassals of the Count of Provence and allies of the House of Baux. The family had many possessions in and around Arles and offended many local families, like the Porcelet.

Through his mother's family, Aicard was allied with the viscounts of Millau, who established a number of matrimonial links with counts and viscounts in southern France at the end of the 11th century.

== Election and first years of archbishopric ==
At the death of Archbishop Raimbaud in 1069, and following negotiations between the petty nobility and the counts, the see of Arles fell to Aicard sometime between 1069 and 1073, probably in 1070. In his first years of government, Aicard continued the policies of his predecessor: an alliance with the counts and the Baux.

The elevation of Aicard did not please Count Bertrand II of Provence. Bernard felt threatened by the rising power of the House of Marseilles and by the exercise of archiepiscopal power over the abbey of Montmajour, which the counts had de facto appropriated as part of their demesne, to act as a dynastic necropolis. In the wider politico-ecclesiastical context of the time, in which Pope and Emperor fought the Investiture Controversy for power over the dioceses of the Church, Aicard was a partisan of emperor against pope and the count, being a vassal of the emperor, was a natural ally of the pope. However that may have been, it is unlikely that the controversy played a great role in the particular events which led to Aicard's expulsion from office.

== Conflict with the pope and counts of Provence ==
Prompted by Bertrand, on 1 March 1079, Pope Gregory VII wrote to the people and clergy of Arles, asking them to choose a new, "suitable" bishop. However, the people, the clergy, the Baux, the Porcelet, and Count Raymond of Saint-Gilles supported Aicard. The city declared against the papal demand at the Council of Avignon in 1080 and refused entry to Ghibbelin of Arles, the new papal appointee, who had the support of the count as well. From that point on, Aicard was officially deposed but ruled as an usurper.

== Later years and death ==
Aicard held the city for many years thereafter. When Pope Urban II, the greatest of the Gregorian reformers after Gregory, travelled through Languedoc and Provence, visiting Montpellier, Nîmes, Saint-Gilles, Tarascon, Avignon, Aix, Cavaillon, and other cities, preaching the First Crusade at the Council of Clermont in 1095, he had to avoid Arles, where the deposed bishop was still in power.

Between 1098 and 1099, however, Aicard probably relinquished his see to follow the Crusade. Ghibbelin appeared for the first time in Urban's papal bull releasing the citizens of Arles from the penalties incurred in 1080. Aicard was in the Holy Land from 1103 to 1105, where he joined Raymond of Saint-Gilles. He returned to Arles after Raymond's death and recuperated his diocese in 1107 when Ghibbelin left as papal legate to Palestine. Aicard died in 1113.
