= Rostang of Arles =

French archbishop

Archbishop of Arles
- In office 879–913
- Preceded by: Rotland of Arles
- Succeeded by: Manasse

Personal details
- Died: 913
- Occupation: Priest

Rostang of Arles (or Rostang I, Rostaing; died 913) was Archbishop of Arles from 870 to 913. He supported the coup d'état of Boso of Provence against the Carolingians in 879.

== Early years ==
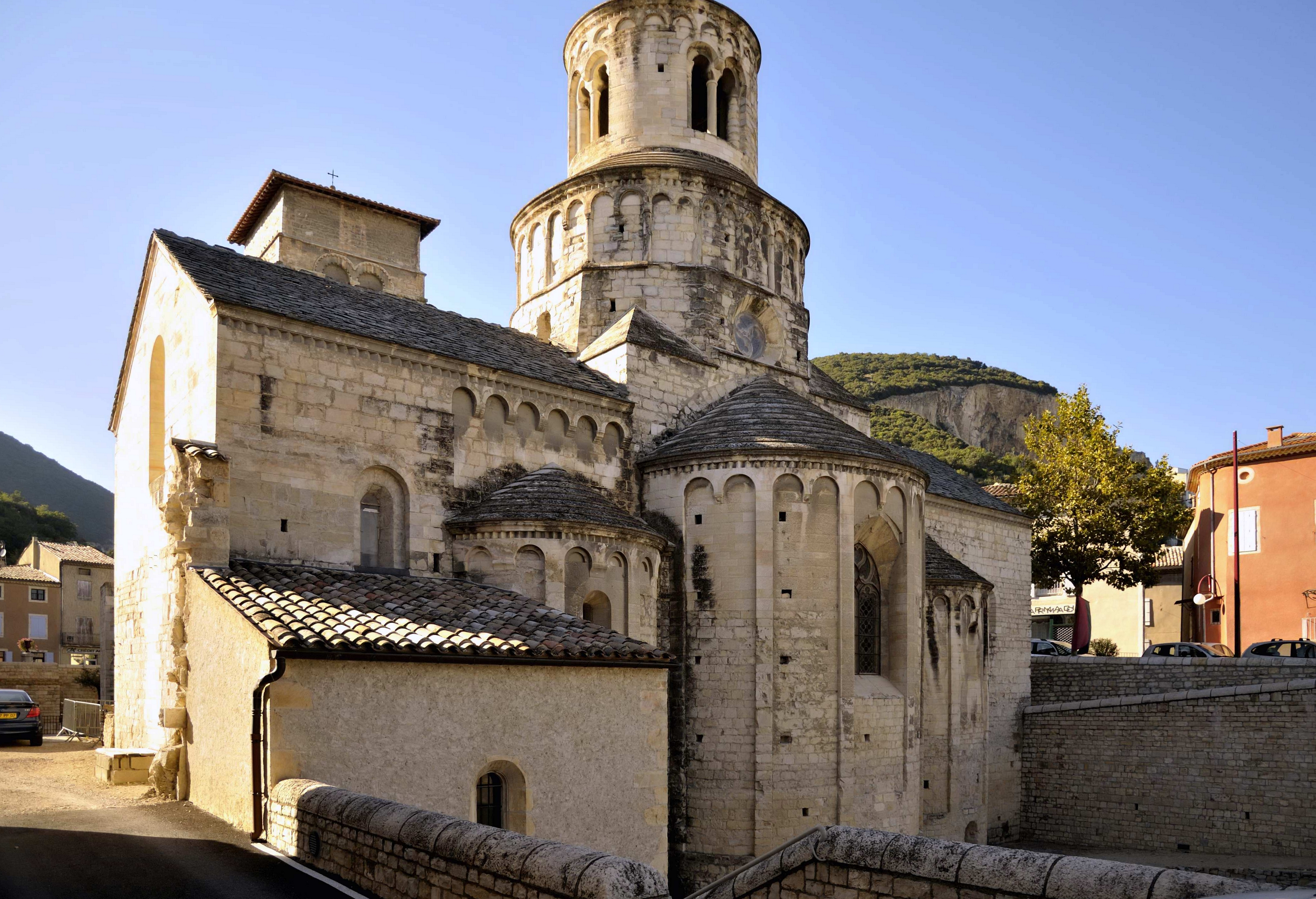
Basilica of Cruas

Rostang became a monk, and then became abbot of Aniane in the diocese of Maguelonne. He kept this abbey long afterwards with the priory of Goudargues in the diocese of Uzès. He also became abbot of Cruas and of the priory of Jourdaigues. In 870, or in 871 according to Augustin Fabre, he received the archbishopric of Arles.

== Archbishop of Arles ==
Throughout his archiepiscopate, he faithfully supported the Bosonids, first Boso, then his son Louis the Blind. When the latter, a recluse in Vienne, entrusted power towards 910 to his cousin Hugh of Arles, the Archbishop of Arles rallied to Hugh, particularly in the conflict between the Burgundian families who followed Hugues in Provence, called "Burgundians" and the aristocratic families of the South, known as "Legitimists".

=== Under Boso, Duke of Provence ===
Around 875 the new Duke of Provence, Boso, seized the property of the Reims church in Provence. These areas, called "Civitis Fretus", have been identified with the current territory of Saint-Rémy-de-Provence, north of Arles. The Archbishop of Reims, Hincmar, turned to Rostang for protection, as 12 years earlier he had requested assistance from the previous Archbishop of Arles, Rotland.

Rostang attended the Council of Pontigni in 876 which ratified the resolutions of the Council of Pavia concerning the coronation of Charles the Bald. In the spring of 878 Pope John VIII, threatened in Italy, came to look for allies on the other side of the Alps. He was welcomed in Arles by Boso, the Duke of Provence, and Rostang who received the pallium. Pope John VIII declared the Arles prelate vicar general in France and enjoined all bishops to obey him.

=== Under Boso, King of Provence ===
Rostang attended several councils, including that of Mantaille in 879, where Boso was crowned King of Provence. He was one of the minority Provençal bishops who vote for the election of Boso. Indeed, only it seems four prelates out of twenty-three (including eleven present) supported this takeover. It underlined the strong commitment at that time of the Arles episcopate to the Burgundian princes. Boso, barely crowned, showed himself in the provinces that had just submitted to his kingdom. He then confirmed, in favor of Archbishop Rostang, the charters by which the emperor Lothaire and his son, his predecessors, had submitted Cruas Abbey in the Vivarais to his church. The monks of this monastery, to prevent schemes of the bishops of the country, had themselves asked these princes to give them the archbishops of Arles as protectors. A charter, the sixth and last of Boso, dated 886 or very early 887, at the request of the Archbishop of Arles reassigns the jurisdiction of Cruas Abbey to Rostaing.

But from the end of the 870s, the city of Arles was exposed to the blows of the Norman and Saracen pirates who ravaged the delta. Saint-Césaire Abbey was sacked and then abandoned. It was not until 883 that it was restored by Rostang. Subsequently, in his will of June 6, 897 the archbishop returned looted property to the monastery. This allowed the resumption of conventual life, and the abbey became an important ecclesiastical lordship of the Arles region.

=== Between Boso and Louis ===
Shortly after Boso's death, Rostang took part in the Council of Nîmes of 888,. (Note: Louis de Mas Latrie dates the Council of Nîmes to 887.) This council was chaired by Theodard, Archbishop of Narbonne, and not by Rostang.

=== Under Louis the Blind ===
Rostang took an active part in 890 in the meeting in Valence which organized a kingdom of Provence around King Louis the Blind, Boso's son.

In 901 or 902, he presided in the Narbonne region over the council of Azillan concerning a dispute of jurisdiction between the deacon Thierry and the priest Tetbald. He was assisted by Arnuste, archbishop of Narbonne In 909, he gave the Church of Apt the villa of Fastignane and its vineyards located at the confluence of the Calavon and the Dôa. He is mentioned in 911 about the appointment of Gérard, Bishop of Narbonne, where he intervened with the Bishop of Uzès, Amélius II. (Note: Gérard is absent from the list of the General History of Languedoc (Histoire générale de Languedoc) as well as the Histoire de Narbonne by J. Michaud and A. Cabanis. The authors of the General History of Languedoc state: Agio had to fight against Gérard, wrongly appointed by Rostaing, Archbishop of Arles, and Amélius, Bishop of Uzès, both subjects of Louis the Blind, king of Provence; but Agio obtained the pallium and ended up being recognized as the only and true bishop.) The Gallia christiana novissima estimates that this episode takes place around 913. This would be during the civil war which was ongoing in the South. It gives some details: after the assassination of Arnuste (Note: This episode was an event in the civil war that began in the South around 912 when Hugues becomes Marquis of Provence, bringing with him his faithful "Burgundians". The ensuing assassinations pushed the "legitimists" into a mass exodus) the archbishop of Narbonne, the clergy and the people sought advice from Rostang who went to Agde with Amèle (Amélius) bishop of Uzès. Rostang elected Gérard, Amèle's nephew. He then went to Narbonne to put Gérard in possession of his archiepiscopate against Agio, who was appointed in the meantime by the bishops of the Province. It was during the reign of Louis, between 890 and 910, that the mint of Arles was given by the king to Rostang.

It is believed that Rostang died in 913. The see of Arles remained vacant for a year, after which, Pons, bishop of Orange, was appointed to fill it; but did not take possession. However, the Gallia christiana novissima refers to an undated document, but according to it from January 920, in which decisions of the Archbishop are reported.

== Sources ==
- Albanés, Joseph Hyacinthe (1901), Gallia christiana novissima (in French), vol. III, Valence: Imprimerie valentinoise
- "Charter VIII", Cartulaire de l'Église d'Apt
- Duport, Gilles (1690), Histoire de l'Église d'Arles (in French), "& assista en 876 au Concile de Pontigni, où l'on approuva tout ce qui avait été résolu au Concile de Pavie, touchant le Couronnement de l'Empereur Charles...
  Rostang fut en 888 au Concile de Nisme."
- Fabre, Augustin (1833), Histoire de Provence (in French), Feissat ainé et Demonchy
- Février, Paul-Albert, ed. (1989), La Provence des origines à l'an mil (in French), Rennes: Ouest-France, ISBN 2-7373-0456-3, "Trois semblent avoir été aux côtés de l'archevêque de Vienne, Ausran, de fermes partisans de Boson et de ses Bourguignons : Rostaing, archevêque d'Arles, Ratfred, évêque d'Avignon ainsi qu'Arbert d'Embrun."
- Mas Latrie, Louis (1836), Chronologie historique des papes, des conciles généraux et des conciles des Gaules et de France (in French), Paris
- Mermet, Thomas (1833), Histoire de la ville de Vienne (in French), vol. 2, Firmin Didot, "La sixième et dernière charte ne porte point de date; elle est tirée ex chartulario Arelatensi. Elle est accordée sur la demande de Rostaing, archevêque d'Arles, à la juridiction duquel elle soumet le monastère de Cruas, situé sur les bords du Rhône, dans le Vivarais. « Cum monachis ibidem Deo militantibus… Cuncti insuper monachi a modo ibidem Deo militaturi.» Ces expressions annoncent qu'à cette époque les moines de Cruas portaient les armes, ce qui était plus commun parmi les ordres religieux qu'on ne le croit généralement."
- Papon, Jean-Pierre (1777), Histoire générale de Provence (in French), Moutard
- Poly, Jean-Pierre (1976), La Provence et la société féodale 879-1166 (in French), Paris: Bordas, ISBN 2040077405
- Rohrbacher, René François (1789-1856), Histoire universelle de l'Eglise catholique (in French), vol. 5
