= Montmajour Abbey =

Fortified Benedictine monastery in medieval France

- Abbaye Saint-Pierre de Montmajour
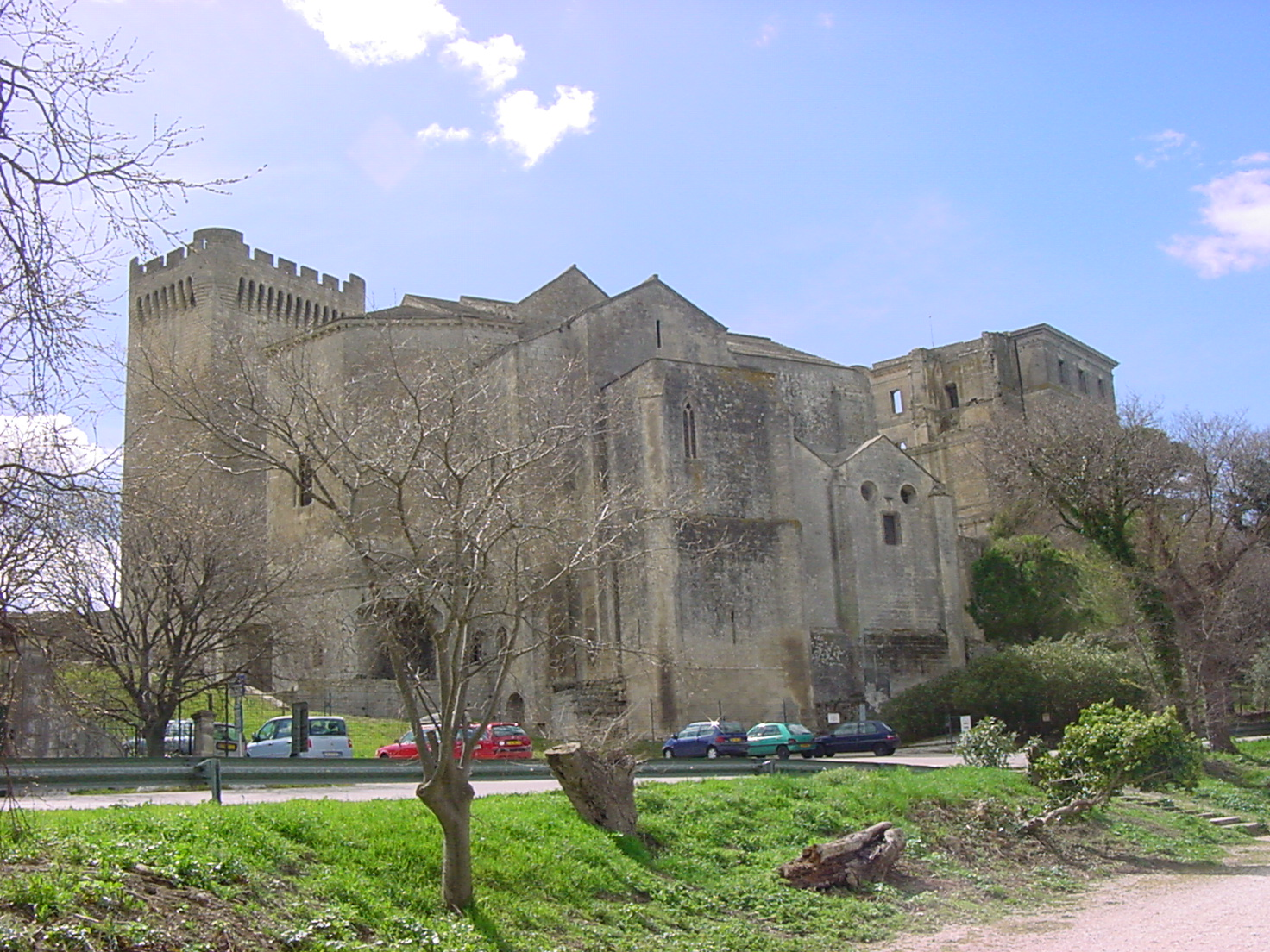
- Montmajour Abbey

- Location within France

Monastery information
- Full name: Abbey of Saint Peter of Montmajour
- Order: Benedictine
- Established: 949
- Disestablished: 1798
- Dedication: Saint Peter
- Diocese: Arles
- Controlled churches: Chapel of the Holy Cross

People
- Founder: Lady Teucinde of Arles

Architecture
- Functional status: secularized
- Heritage designation: National Historical Monument
- Designated date: 1840
- Architect: Pierre II Mignard (Maurist monastery)
- Style: Gothic and Neoclassical

Site
- Coordinates: 43°42′20″N 4°39′50″E
- Website: https://www.abbaye-montmajour.fr/en/

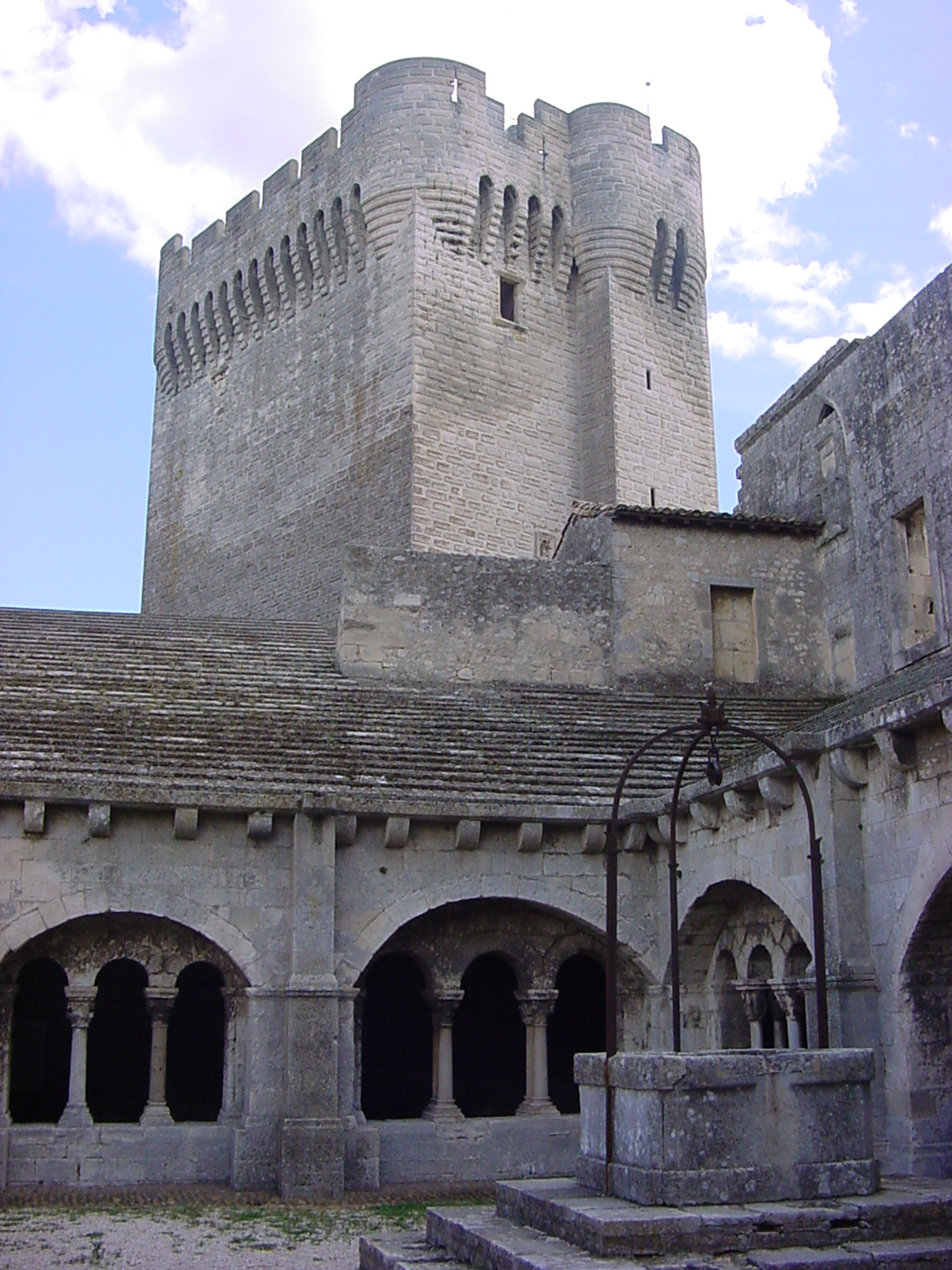
View of the Pons de l'Orme tower (14th century) from the cloister

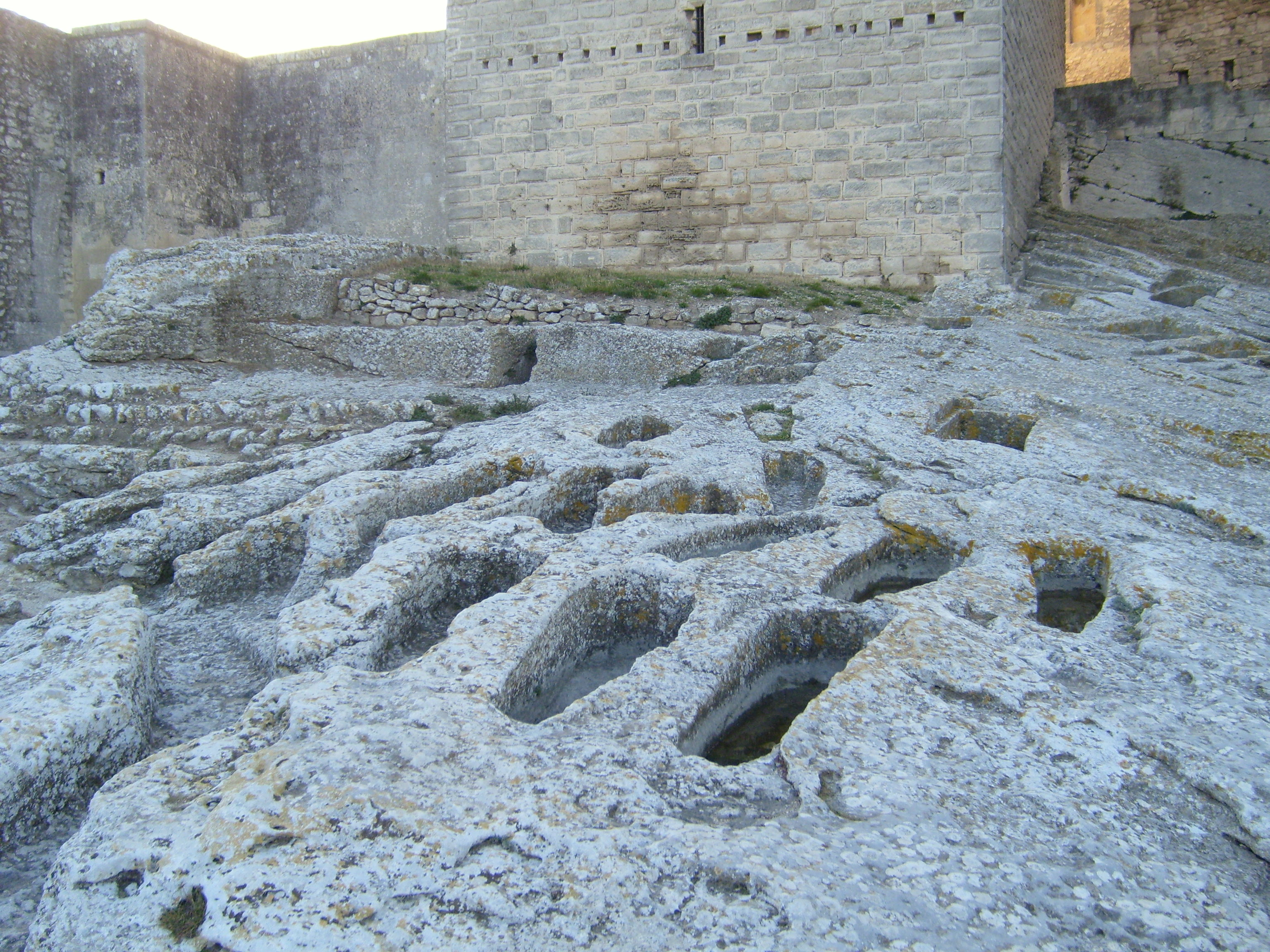
Rock tombs (11th–14th century)

Montmajour Abbey, formally the Abbey of St. Peter in Montmajour (French: Abbaye Saint-Pierre de Montmajour [abei sɛ̃ pjɛʁ də mɔ̃maʒuʁ]; Occitan: Abadia de Sancte Pèire en Montmajour), was a fortified Benedictine monastery built between the 10th and 18th centuries on what was originally an island five kilometers north of Arles, in what is now the Bouches-du-Rhône Department, in the region of Provence in the south of France.

The abbey complex consists of six sections:

- the hermitage, dating from the 11th century, which includes the Chapel of St. Peter;
- the cloister, built during the 12th and 13th centuries;
- the adjacent Chapel of the Holy Cross, built during the 12th century;
- the fortified Monastery of St. Peter, built during the 14th century;
- the Tower of Abbot Pons de l'Orme, dating from the same period;
- the Maurist monastery, built in the 17th century.

The abbey is noted for its 11th–14th-century graves, carved in the rock, its subterranean crypt, and its massive unfinished church. It was an important pilgrimage site during the Middle Ages, and in the 18th century it was the site of a large Maurist monastery, now in ruin. The abbey and the landscape around it were frequently painted and drawn by Vincent van Gogh. During the production for the 1968 film, The Lion in Winter that featured the abbey, Katharine Hepburn's dressing room was accommodated in the basement.

It has been listed since 1840 as a monument historique by the French Ministry of Culture. Today the ruins of the abbey are cared for as a historic monument by the Centre des monuments nationaux.

== Early history and legends of Montmajour ==
Until the late Middle Ages, Montmajour was an island, 43 meters above the surrounding terrain, protected by marshes and accessible only by boat. As early as the 3rd millennium BC the island was used as a cemetery, with individual graves carved into the rock. In the 9th and 10th centuries the island also served as a sanctuary for the local residents during invasions of the Saracens and the Normans. During the Middle Ages, several legends arose about Montmajour and its founding. One legend said that the island had been the sanctuary of St. Trophimus, who had been sent from Rome by St. Peter to convert the Gauls. After coming to Arles in 46 AD, he took shelter in one of the caves on the island and received disciples there. A rock cell under the church is called "The Confessional of St. Trophimus." Until 943 the island belonged to the Church of St. Trophime in Arles.

Another legend said that the graves were those of soldiers of Charlemagne, who had fought against the Saracens. A third legend said that the first church was founded by King Childebert I, the son of Clovis, when he saw the fervor of a group of hermits on the island.

== Chronology ==
- 949 - A Frankish noblewoman, Teucinde of Arles, acquires the island from the Archbishop of Arles, and leaves it in her will to a group of hermits already residing on the island, with instructions to create a monastery following the Rule of St. Benedict.
- 963 - Pope Leo VIII puts the monastery under his direct patronage and raises it to the status of an abbey.
- 11th century - The first Abbey Church of Mary, Mother of the Lord (French: Marie la mère du seigneur) is built between 1030-69. The Chapel of St. Peter is excavated into the rock on the south side of the hill, near the cemetery. The crypt of the church is consecrated by Pons de Marignane, Archbishop of Arles, on 3 May, most likely in 1019, at the insistence of Rambert, the 7th Abbot of Montmajour. The abbey church becomes the resting place of the Counts of Provence.
- 1030 - The abbey acquires what is believed to be a fragment of the True Cross obtained from a larger piece which had been venerated in Arles since the 4th century. The Chapel of St. Benedict is dedicated to the relic, and the abbey thereby becomes a major pilgrimage site. It was dedicated in that year by the Archbishop of Arles, who proclaimed the "Pardon of Montmajor" for all those seeking absolution from their sins who went to that remote location on May 3, the obsolete feast day of the Finding of the True Cross known as "Roodmas", and who left a donation for the completion of the abbey church. By the 12th century the shrine has become so popular with pilgrims that the abbey has to build a separate church for the relic, the Chapel of the Holy Cross, located outside the abbey walls.
- 12th century - The second abbey church is built, possibly on the site of the previous one. The abbey is at the peak of its influence and wealth. It possesses vineyards, cornfields, olive groves, waterways, mills, fisheries and forests, and had dependent priories and land all over Provence, and as far away as Fréjus, Sisteron and Grenoble. The rulers of Provence give the abbey land, castles, and even entire towns, such as Pertuis.
- Construction of the Abbey Church of Our Lady is begun, but because of a shortage of money, only the first two bays are completed.
- 13th century - The abbey has 60 resident monks, a large number for the period. By then it is the motherhouse of a network of 56 priories, subject to the Abbot of Montmajour.
- 1348 - The Black Plague reduces by half the population of Provence.
- 1357 - The Free Company, armies of French soldiers left unpaid after the defeat of France by the English army at Poitiers during the Hundred Years War, ravage the countryside. It is pillaged again by marauders under Arnaud de Cervole in 1357, and later by the soldiers of Raimond de Turenne of Les Baux, who wage war against Arles from 1386 to 1398. The Abbot of Montmajour, Pons de L'Orme, then fortifies the monastery with a massive tower. Starvation and destruction become widespread in Provence.
- 1593 - During the Wars of Religion, the abbey is occupied by soldiers of the Catholic League, and the monks are forced to move to Arles for two years. When they return, they find the monastery ruined.
- 1639 - Against the wishes of the majority of monks, the abbey is given to a new Benedictine congregation, the Maurists, a Benedictine reform based at the Abbey of Saint-Germain-des-Prés in Paris. Despite the hostility of the "old" monks, and of the commendatory abbot, Charles Bichi, whose family had purchased his title from the king and who does not reside at the abbey and refuses to pay for its upkeep, the Maurists begin a program of restoration and construction.
- Though the Maurists monks number only 30, their construction program is grandiose - they begin a classical building designed to have 25 bays along its north and south facades. Sixteen bays are completed by the time of the French Revolution.
- 1786 - The titular abbot, Cardinal Louis de Rohan, refuses to pay anything further for the upkeep of the abbey, and it was officially secularized.
- 1789 - At the time of the French Revolution, only nine monks remain at Montmajour.
- 1791-1793 - The monastery is sold for 62,000 livres to Elizabeth Roux-Châtelard, who strips the Maurist building and leaves it in ruins. The property is then divided and resold to twenty different owners. The medieval part is used for a sheep farm and haylofts.
- 1797 - The painter Jacques Réattu buys the Pons de l'Orme tower, saving it from destruction.
- 1822 - The city of Arles buys the Chapel of the Holy Cross from a fisherman, and preserves it.
- 1840 - The writer Prosper Mérimée, Inspector of Ancient Monuments for the French government, puts the abbey on the first list of French historical monuments which should be preserved. Restoration begins on some of the buildings in 1862, and continues for decades.
- 1859 - The last of the Romanesque and Gothic properties are purchased by the state. The Maurist building is not purchased until 1921.
- 1944 - A major fire breaks out inside the abbey church, which is being used by the German Army as an arms depot.

== St. Peter's Chapel (11th century) ==
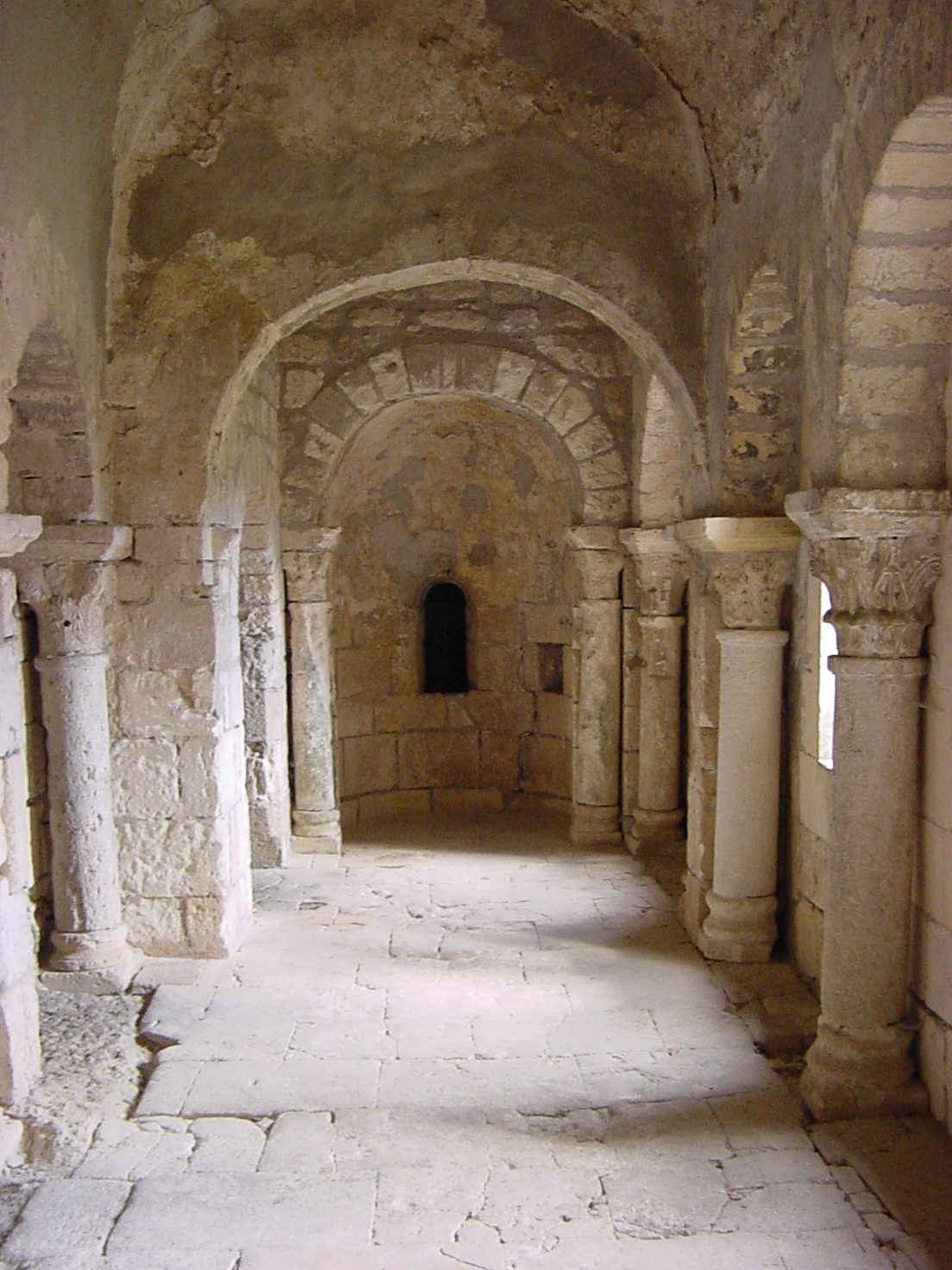
Nave of St. Peter's Chapel (11th century)

St. Peter's Chapel is the oldest existing part of the abbey, probably built between 1030 and 1050. It consists of a narthex and two parallel naves, the older one cut into the rock on the south side of the hill, and an arcade of rounded Romanesque arches resting on columns, creating openings to the rock cemetery. The columns are older than the church, and probably come from Roman buildings in Arles; but the capitals of the columns are carved with Romanesque floral designs. The southern nave is complete with a choir and a semi-circular apse.

Inside the church a passage leads to what appears to be a natural cave, with a small window, which according to tradition was the home of St. Trophimus and the first monks to live on the island.

The chapel was severely vandalized in 1976, with restoration due by 2012.

== Rock Cemetery (11th-14th century) ==
The rocky slope near St. Peter's Chapel has more than a dozen tombs cut into the rock in the shape of human bodies, with places for the head, shoulders and feet. The more recent tombs (14th century) were rectangular, and were probably covered with stone slabs. Most of the tombs are oriented with the feet toward the east, the direction of the sunrise and the Resurrection.

== Chapel of the Holy Cross (12th century) ==
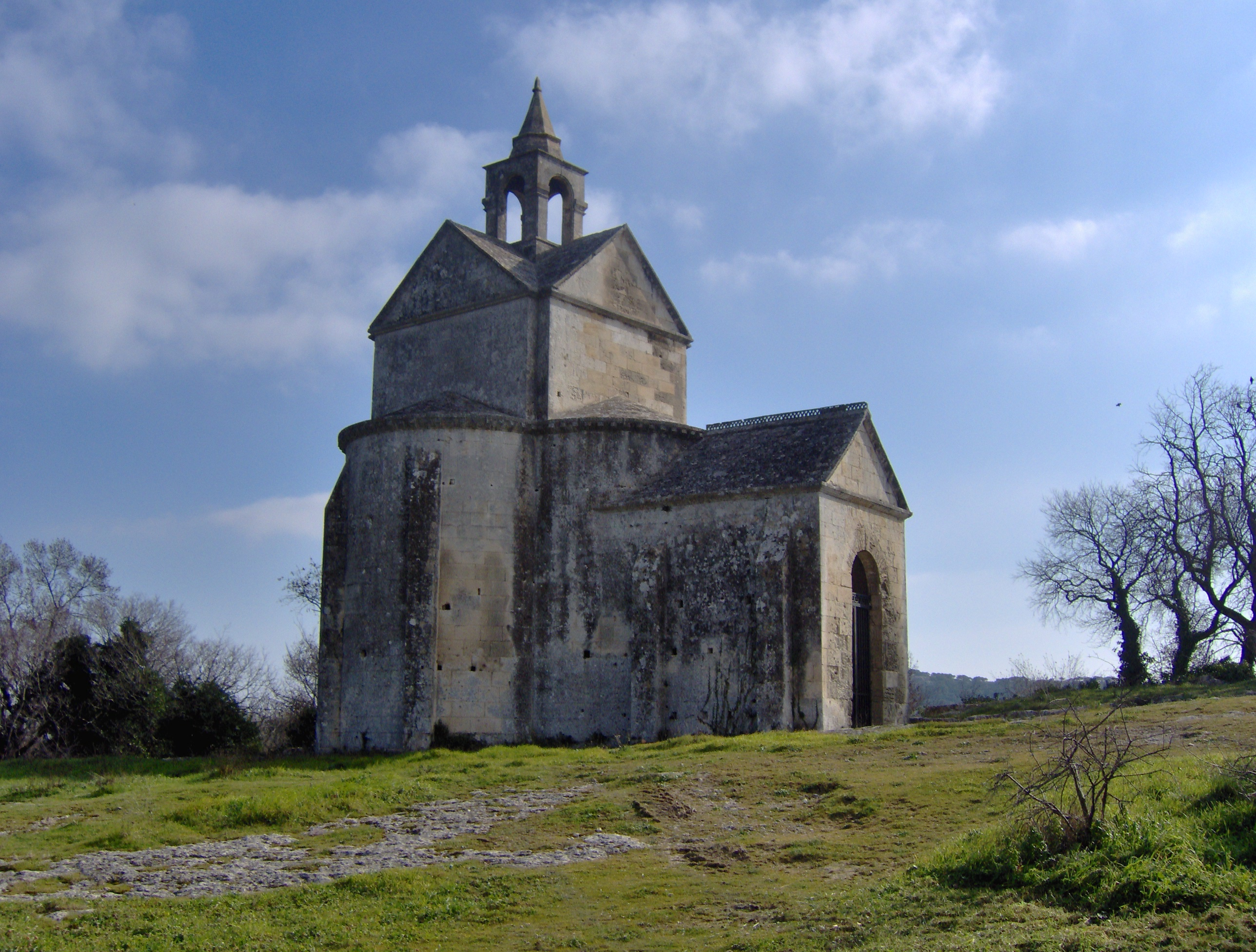
Chapel of the Holy Cross

The Chapel of the Holy Cross (French: Chapelle de Sainte-Croix) was built to contain the most valuable relic of the abbey, a piece of the True Cross. It is located a few hundred meters from the abbey church, outside the monastery walls, to provide the monks with greater separation from the crowds of pilgrims.

It was dedicated on 20 April and is in the shape of a cross, with a vestibule on the north side, and four semicircular apses with semicircular domes around a square bay with a cloister vault. The vault is crowned by a perfect stone square, topped by triangular pediments and a small tower. The cornices and pediments are decorated with dentils. The building, with its dignity, simplicity, symmetry and perfect craftsmanship, is considered a masterpiece of Romanesque architecture.

== Crypt of St Benedict (12th century) ==
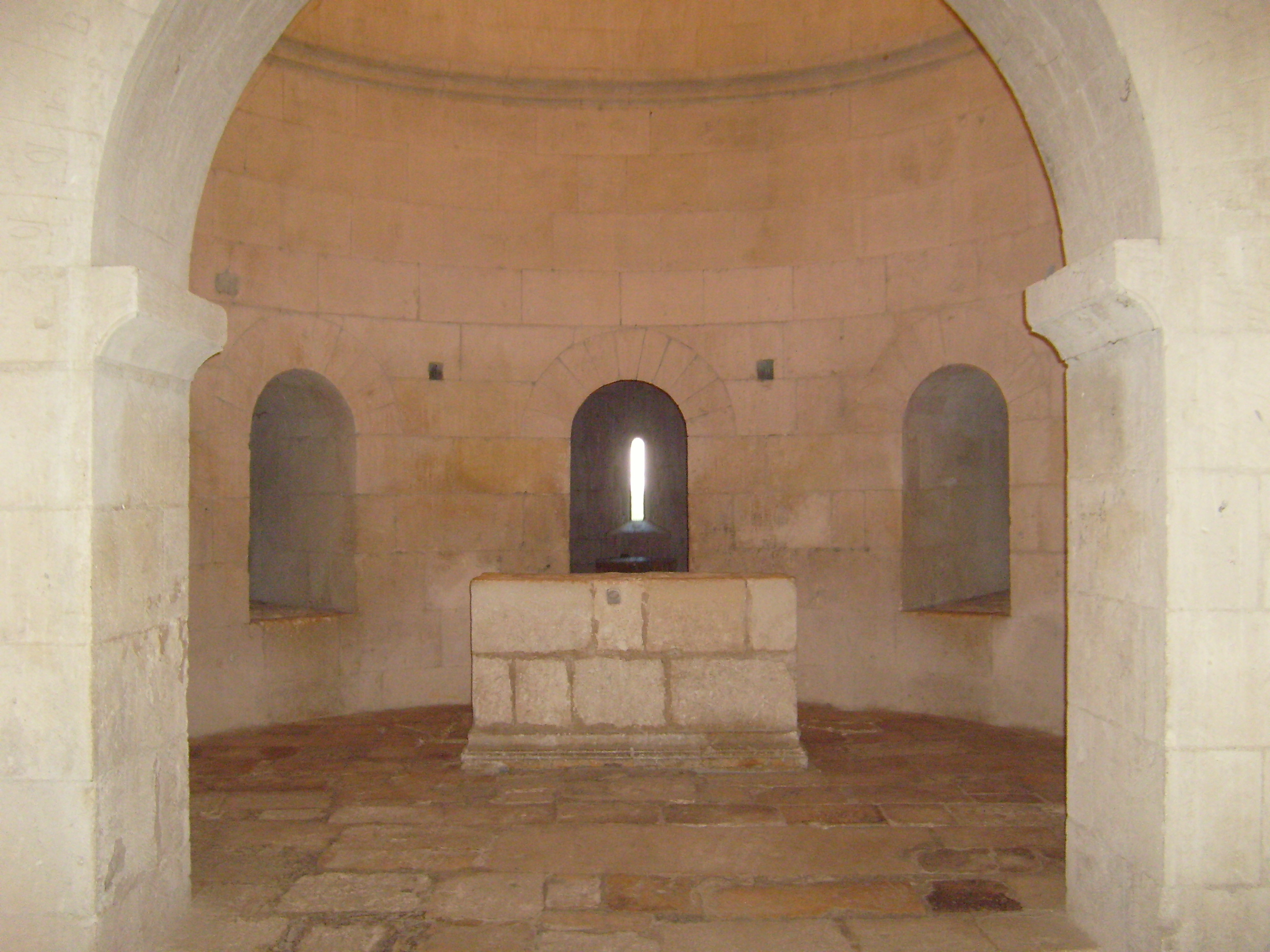
Crypt of St. Benedict Rotunda (12th century)

The crypt of St Benedict is partly dug into the rock of the hill and partly built of massive stone walls, perfectly cut. It features a transept with two absidioles, or small chapels, and a passage which leads to a small rotunda which is crowned with a cupola. The rotunda is surrounded by an ambulatory a tall, narrow hemicircular corridor with a stone barrel vault. On its outer side, the ambulatory opens into five radiating chapels, each with its own window catching the eastern light, and its own small barrel-vaulted choir bay and semi-domed apse. The large number of small chapels allowed the large number of monks in the monastery to quickly celebrate the morning mass. A striking feature of the crypt is the smooth quality of the stone work- the stones are perfectly cut and fitted, and their only texture is the slight rippling caused by dressing the stone with the help of a toothed hammer.

== Nave and choir of the Abbey Church of Notre-Dame (12th century) ==
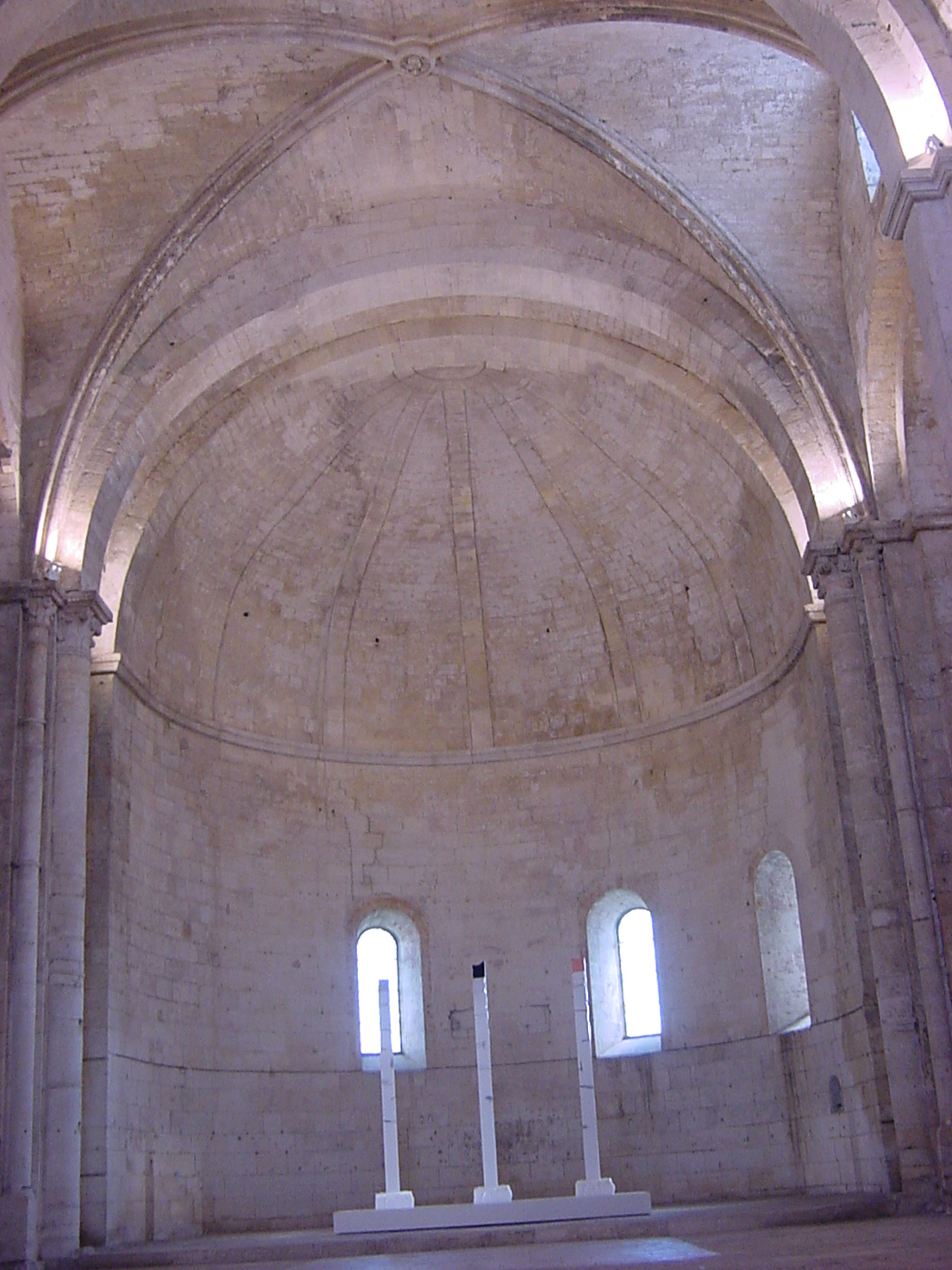
Apse of the abbatial church (12th century)

The massive church on top of the crypt has a single nave fourteen meters wide. It was designed to have five bays, but apparently because of a shortage of funds only two bays were constructed, and the west end was left unfinished.

The nave is covered with slightly pointed barrel vaults supported by projecting traverse arches resting upon cruciform piers.

The apse, at the east end of the church, is semicircular, and has the same diameter as the width of the nave. It has an imposing semi-spherical dome with five flat ribs, and three small windows, slightly offset to one side. Perhaps because of the strong mistral and tramontane winds from the north, the nave has no windows on the north side.

The church has a relatively short transept, each wing ending in a small apsidiole.

There are three doorways on the south side of the church; one leading to the rock cemetery, one to abbot's lodging (now ruined); and one to the chapter house and the spiral stairway to the bell tower.

Two new chapels were added to the north side of the nave in the 15th century. One, which served as the sacristy, contains the 18th century lavabo, or washing basin, and the other protected the charters of the Abbey.

== The cloister (12th century) ==
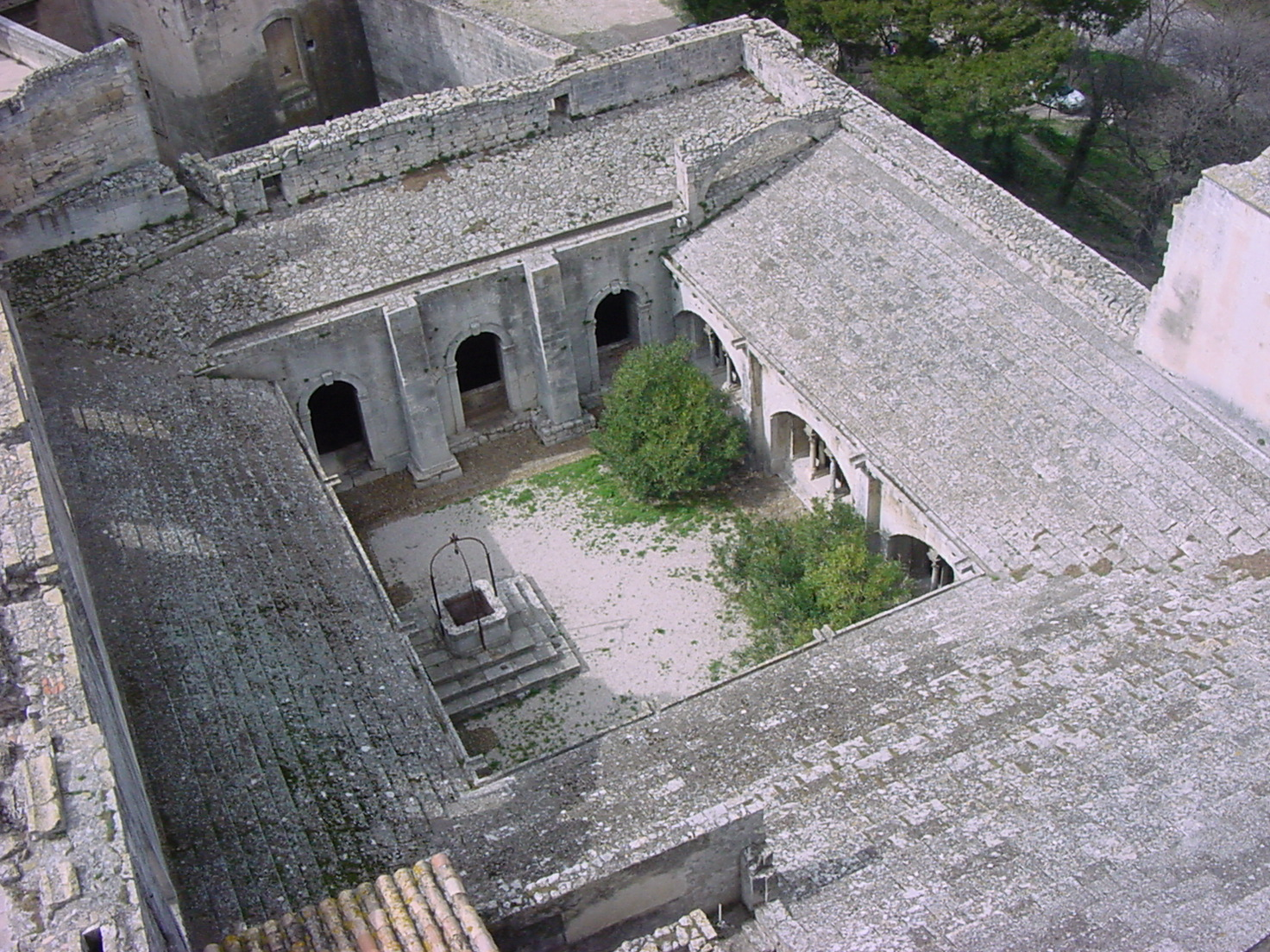
View of the cloister from the watchtower

The cloister was built to the south of the church. It was meant to reinforce the walls of the first four bays of the church, but these bays were never built. It is rectangular, 27 meters long and 24 meters wide. In the center is a cistern which collected rainwater through pipes and channels from the roofs of the monastery buildings.

The north gallery is the oldest part of the cloister. The traverse arches are supported by brackets decorated with carvings of real and mythological beasts, including a tarasque. Some of the foliage-decorated columns show human heads looking through the foliage. The original sculpted capitals were repaired in the 19th century.

At the beginning of the east gallery is the tomb of the Counts of Provence, built to hold the remains of Count Raymond Berenger IV (died 1181). The only original Romanesque capitals are in this arcade, representing the Temptation of Christ by a small devil with flaming hair; on the other side is an acrobat performing splits, and an apple, the symbol of temptation.

The west gallery was extensively altered by the Maurist monks in the 18th century, but the brackets have some of the most vivid carvings, showing the Mistral wind, the moon, the sun and fire, and a mythical amphibious beast devouring a man. It also has 13th century graffiti depicting sailing ships and horses.

The south gallery is the most recent, and the carvings are the most realistic; a donkey, a monkey, a camel and an eagle are depicted on the brackets, and the columns show the Annunciation the crowning of the Virgin, and knights fighting.

The Chapter House was connected with the east gallery- here the monks gathered each morning to hear a chapter of the Rule of St. Benedict followed by a brief teaching on it by the abbot, and also discussed the management of the abbey. It is lit by a single oculus, or round window, and connected with the nave and by a stairway to the dormitory.

The Refectory, or dining room, connected with the south gallery through a Romanesque door decorated with a grotesque head of Tantalus.

The dormitory of the monks occupied the entire floor over the refectory, and was connected to it by two staircases.

The west gallery formerly connected to the cellar, bakery, bread oven, and guest rooms, which no longer exist.

== The Tower of Pons de l'Orme (14th century) ==
The tower was built by the abbot and cardinal, Pons de l'Orme, beginning in 1369 to protect the abbey from the rampaging Free Company (see chronology.) The tower is 26 meters high, and contained a well and a storeroom for provisions, having three stories in the upper level. The top is equipped with battlements, arrow slits and machicolation, designed to drop unpleasant things on the heads of attackers. The coat of arms of the abbot, an elm tree with two angel-monks, is carved on the outside of the tower.

== The Maurist monastery (18th century) ==
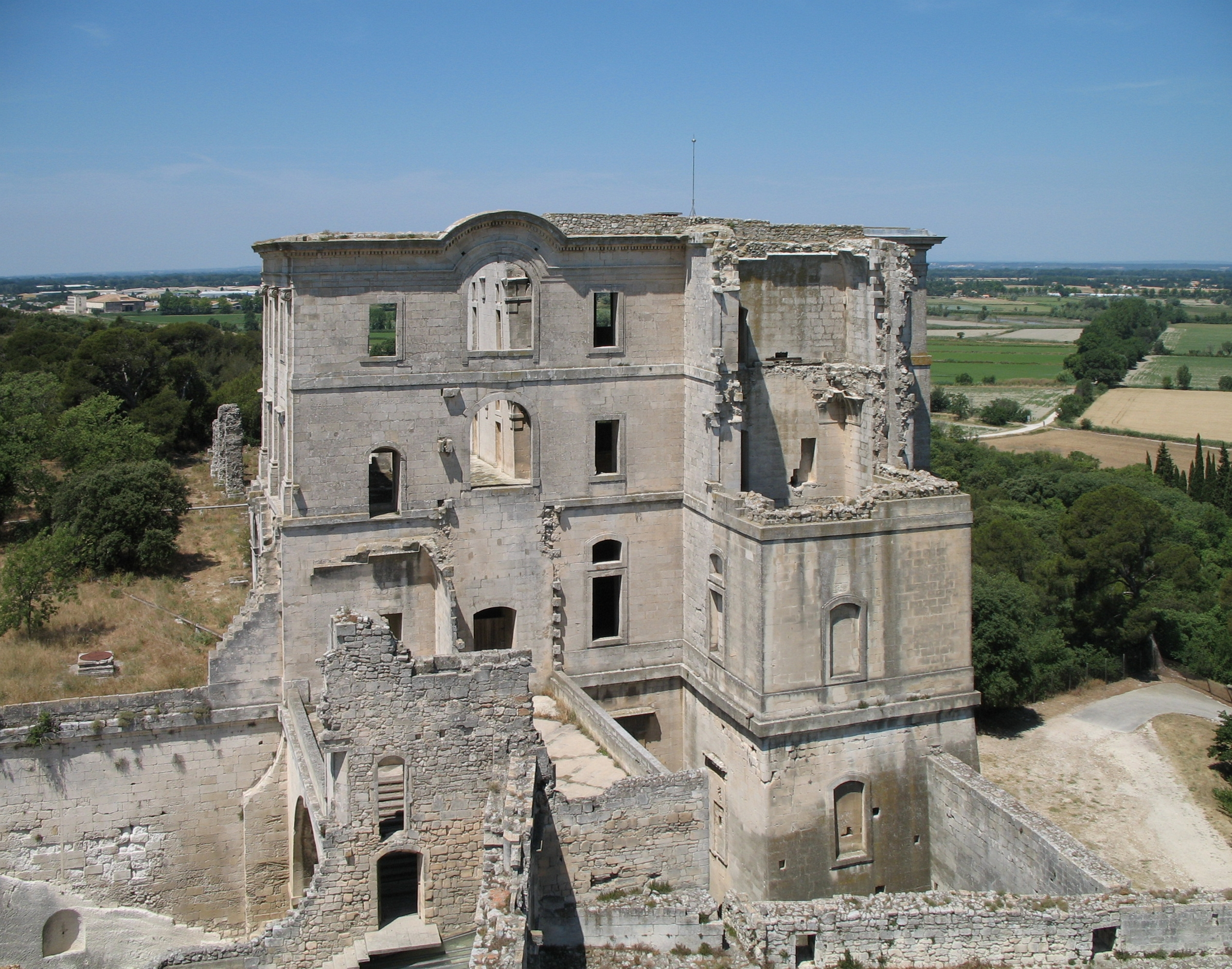
Ruins of the Maurist monastery (18th century)

The ruined Maurist Monastery was built in the classical style by architect Pierre Mignard on a huge scale; the building was originally five stories high, covering eight thousand square meters, with sixty windows and two grand staircases. The monks, lay brothers and novices lived on the top two floors, with their library, classrooms and archives. The building was largely demolished after the French Revolution for its building materials (see Chronology.)

== Vincent van Gogh at Montmajour Abbey ==
The painter Vincent van Gogh, who lived in nearby Arles, frequently painted and drew the Abbey and the landscape around it. In a letter to his brother in July 1888, he said he had been at Montmajour at least fifty times "to see the view over the plain." He wrote on July 5, 1888: "Yesterday, at sunset, I was on a stony heath, where very small, twisted oaks grow, in the background a ruin on the hill, and wheat fields in the valley. it was romantic, and couldn't be more so."

A painting that van Gogh had done on July 4, 1888, Sunset at Montmajour, long considered a fake, was authenticated and placed on display in the Van Gogh Museum in Amsterdam in September 2013.

== Gallery ==
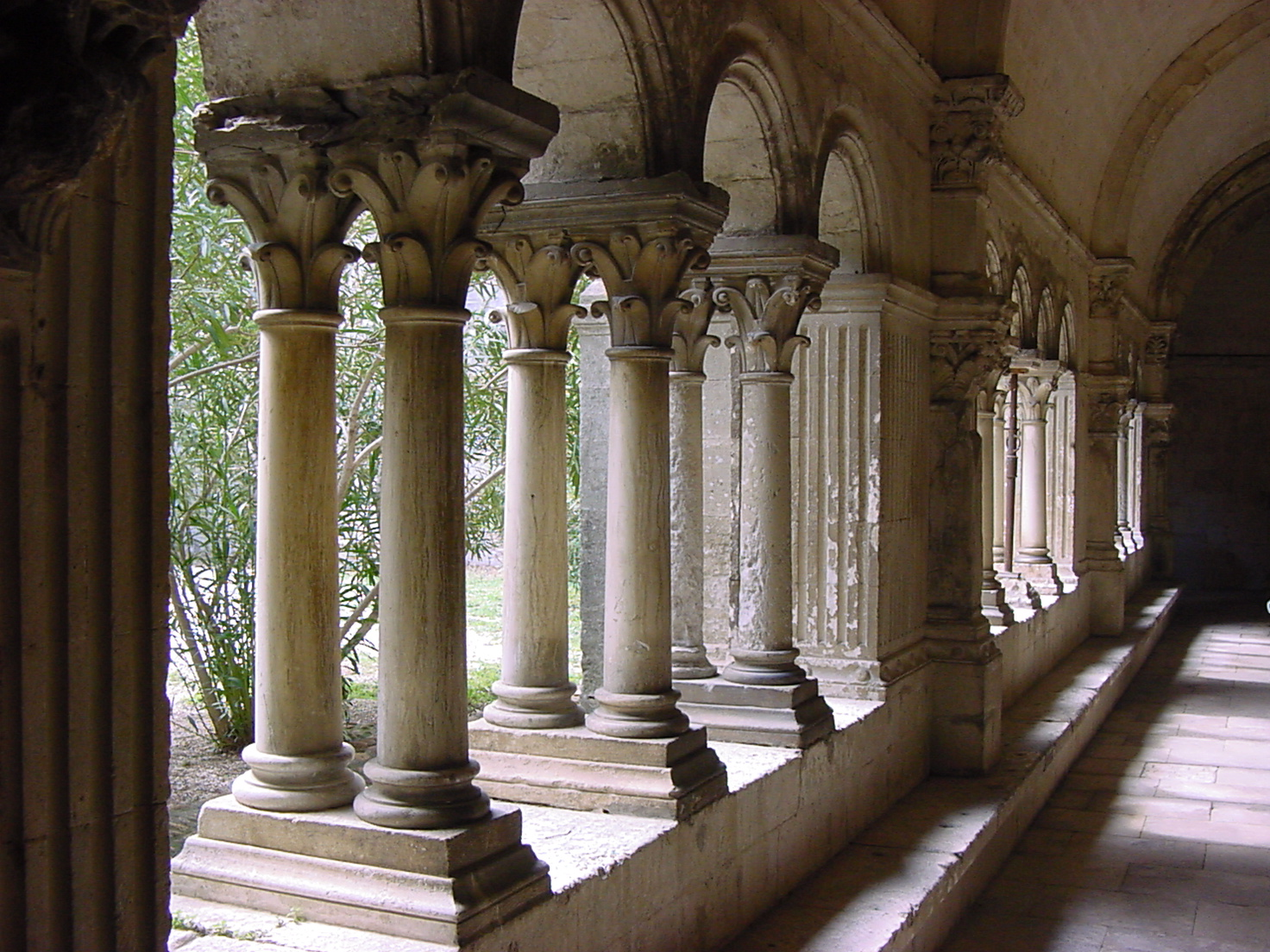
The cloister (12th century)

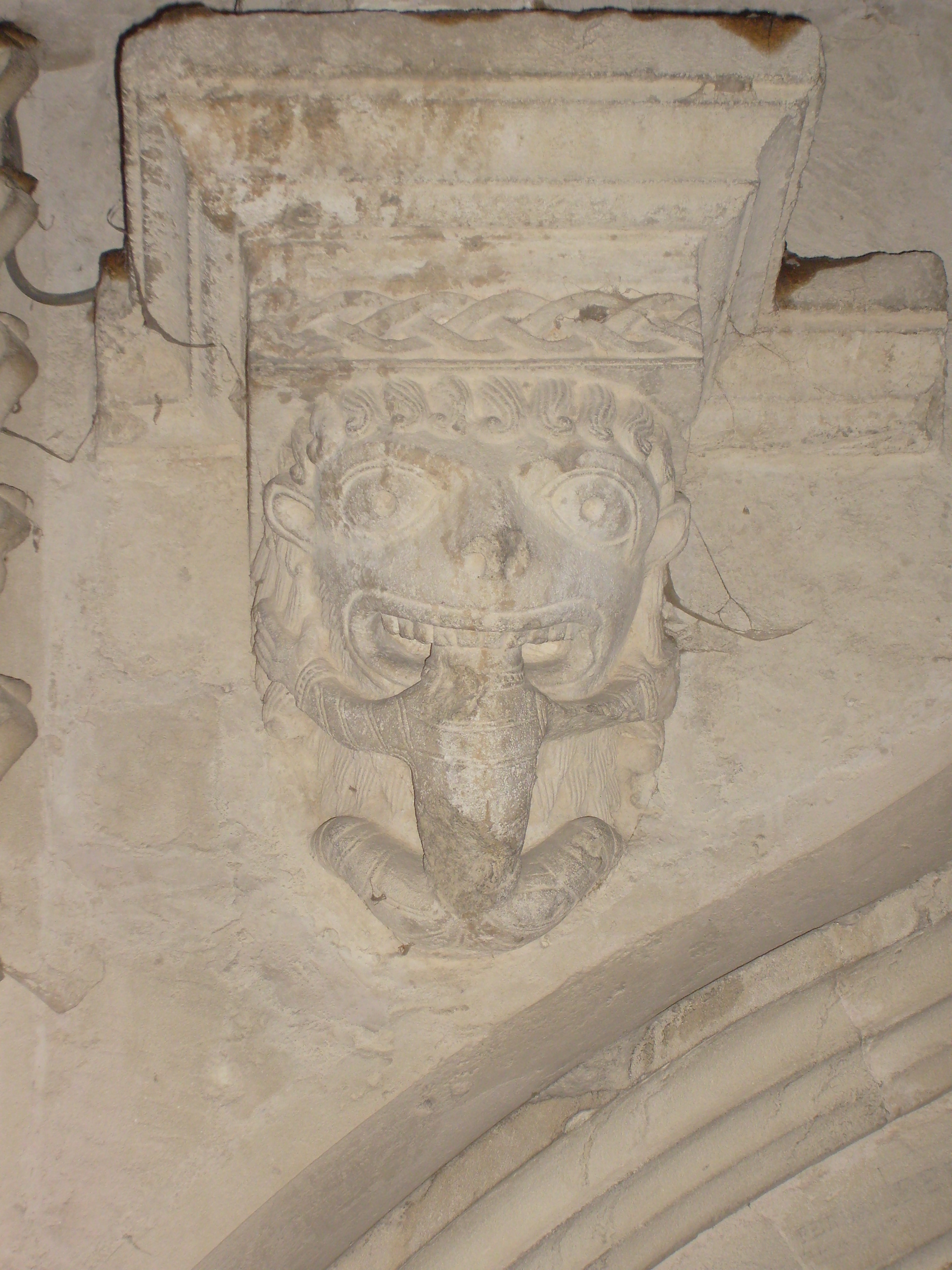
Carving of a tarasque, a legendary monster, devouring a man, from the cloister (12th century)

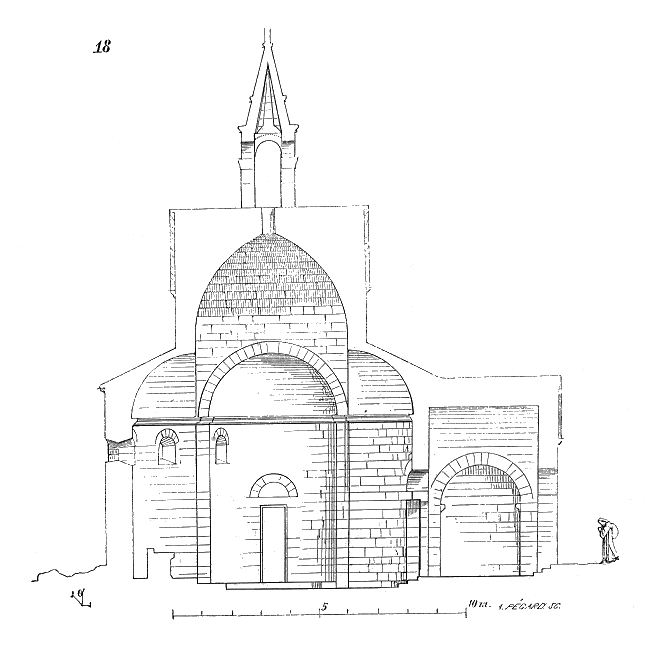
Cross-Section of the Chapel of the Holy Cross, from Viollet-le-Duc

== Bibliography ==
- The Abbey of Montmajour, Jean-Maurice Rouquette and Aldo Bastié, Monum - Editions du Patrimoine, 2000
- Aldo Bastiée, Histoire de la Provence, Editions Ouest-France, 2001
- Jeanne de Flandreysy (1922). Arles et l'abbaye de Montmajour. Marseille: F. Detaille. OCLC 4326937.
