= Jean Ferrier I =

Most Reverend Jean Ferrier
- Archbishop of Arles
- Church: Catholic Church
- Archdiocese: Archdiocese of Arles
- In office: 1499–1521
- Predecessor: Nicola Cybo
- Successor: Jean Ferrier II
- Previous post: Bishop of Melfi (1498–1499)

Personal details
- Died: 17 January 1521 Arles, France

Jean Ferrier or Juan Ferrer (died 1521) was a Roman Catholic prelate who served as Archbishop of Arles (1499–1521) and Bishop of Melfi (1498–1499).

== Biography ==
On 3 December 1498, Jean Ferrier was appointed Bishop of Melfi by Pope Alexander VI. On 26 July 1499, he was appointed during the papacy of Pope Alexander VI as Archbishop of Arles.

He served as Archbishop of Arles until his death on 17 January 1521.

While bishop, he was the principal consecrator of Guillaume de Pélissier, Bishop of Orange (1510).

== External links and additional sources ==
- Cheney, David M. "Diocese of Melfi-Rapolla-Venosa". Catholic-Hierarchy.org. (for Chronology of Bishops) ^{[self-published]}
- Chow, Gabriel. "Diocese of Melfi-Rapolla-Venosa (Italy)". GCatholic.org. (for Chronology of Bishops) ^{[self-published]}
- Cheney, David M. "Archdiocese of Arles". Catholic-Hierarchy.org. (for Chronology of Bishops) ^{[self-published]}
- Chow, Gabriel. "Metropolitan Archdiocese of Arles (France)". GCatholic.org. (for Chronology of Bishops) ^{[self-published]}

Catholic Church titles
Preceded by Juan de Borja Lanzol de Romaní, el menor	Bishop of Melfi; 1498–1499	Succeeded by Raffaele di Ceva
Preceded by Nicola Cybo	Archbishop of Arles; 1499–1521	Succeeded by Jean Ferrier II
