= Ithier of Arles =

French archbishop

Archbishop of Arles
- In office before March 963 – 981
- Preceded by: Manasse
- Succeeded by: Anno

Personal details
- Died: 198

Ithier (or Itier, Iterius; died 981) was Archbishop of Arles from before March 963 until 981.

== Biography ==
Ithier may have been from the Lyonnais, because this name is extremely rare in Provence but common in Lyonnais. He would then be a follower of King Conrad I of Burgundy, who became suzerain of Provence in 949. Only a few elements of Ithier's life are known.

- 969 (1 March): Through an exchange with Count Boso II of Arles, (Note: Boso II of Arles seems to have died in 968. This act would therefore be posthumous.) Count of Provence, Ithier acquires the ruined castrum of Sanctum Amantum. This is the origin of the village of Saint-Chamas.
- 970: The archbishop of Arles comes to Cruas to dedicate a chapel, under the invocation of Saint Michael, that a lady Gotolinde had just built on the site of a primitive church .
- 972: Ithier undertakes to revive the Abbey of Saint Caesarius in Arles.
- 973 (19 July): Teucinde of Arles obtains from Archbishop Ithier the concession of Saint-Hippolyte near Arles, to rebuild it, restore it, and own it with her nephew Riculfe, the Bishop of Fréjus, until the end of their days.
- 976–978: During the conflict between Aymon of Valence, the Bishop of Valence, and a certain Achard, a synod excommunicates Achard in an edict solemnly deposited on the high altar of the Church of St. Trophime, Arles, intended for the Archbishop Ithier.
- Members of the Jewish community of the city manage part of the patrimony of the archbishop,
- Ithier cedes the property of Goudargues to one of his proteges, Thibert.
- Ithier mints money explicitly signed in his name. (Note: The local coinage began with a program for the benefit of the Saint-Étienne cathedral in Arles, and was struck by Ithier with his initial, a copy of which was discovered in the treasury of Le Puy.)
- Laugier of Nice receives from the Archbishop of Arles the villa Niomes and property in Busayrol, located in the county of Vaison. In 981, this gift was confirmed by Annon, successor of Ithier.

Between 965 and 972 Ithier was the only metropolitan of Provence. The prelates he appointed swore to him not only canonical obedience but also the oath of fidelity. The coinage of Arles, in decline since the end of the ninth century, was resumed under his archiepiscopate with coins bearing his initials.

== Sources ==
- Aurell, Martin; Boyer, Jean-Paul; Coulet, Noël (2005), La Provence au Moyen Âge (in French), Aix-en-Provence: Univ. de Provence, ISBN 2853996174
- Depeyrot, G. (1993), Le numéraire carolingien : corpus des monnaies (in French), Paris, "Les frappes locales commencèrent avec une émission au profit de la cathédrale Saint-Étienne d'Arles frappée par Ithier dont un exemplaire a été découvert dans le trésor du Puy"
- Poly, Jean-Pierre (1976), La Provence et la société féodale 879-1166 (in French), Paris: Bordas, ISBN 2040077405
