= Jean Ferrier II =

Most Reverend Jean Ferrier
- Archbishop of Arles
- Church: Catholic Church
- Archdiocese: Archdiocese of Arles
- In office: 1521–1550
- Predecessor: Jean Ferrier I
- Successor: Jacques du Broullat

Personal details
- Died: 1550 Arles, France

Jean Ferrier or Juan Ferrer (died 1550) was a Roman Catholic prelate who served as Archbishop of Arles (1521–1550).

== Biography ==
On 23 Aug 1518, he was appointed during the papacy of Pope Leo X as Coadjutor Archbishop of Arles and succeeded to the archbishopric on 17 Jan 1521. He served as Archbishop of Arles until his death in 1550.

== External links and additional sources ==
- Cheney, David M. "Archdiocese of Arles". Catholic-Hierarchy.org. (for Chronology of Bishops) ^{[self-published]}
- Chow, Gabriel. "Metropolitan Archdiocese of Arles (France)". GCatholic.org. (for Chronology of Bishops) ^{[self-published]}

Catholic Church titles
Preceded by Jean Ferrier I	Archbishop of Arles; 1521–1550	Succeeded by Jacques du Broullat
