= Rotland of Arles =

Archbishop of Arles

Archbishop of Arles
- In office c. 851–869
- Succeeded by: Rostang of Arles

Personal details
- Died: 18 September 869
- Occupation: Priest

Rotland of Arles (also Rotlandus, Rolland, d. 18 September 869) was archbishop of Arles from c. 851 until his death in 869.

He is mentioned in a letter by Leo IV in 852 and in an act by Lothar I in 854. He participated in the Council of Valence on Predestination and Grace in 855. He is again mentioned in a letter by Louis the German to the bishops of his realm in 863, and in a letter by Nicolas I dated 12 May 864. He was the only bishop of Gaul to side with the pope who opposed Lothar II's decision to divorce his wife Teutberga in order to marry Waltrade of Wormsgau. He participated in the Council of Pistres and in the Council of Pavia in 864.

During Rotland's reign, the southern coast of France was plagued by Muslim pirates. In a raid in Camargue in September 869, Rotland was captured as he was supervising the organisation of the region's defence. His captors demanded a ransom of weapons and slaves. The ransom was paid, but Rotland had died before he could be released, so the Saracens gave back his body, fully dressed and seated on a chair. He was buried on 22 September 869 in the crypt of Notre-Dame des Grâces in Arles, between the sarcophagi of saints Genesius and Concordius.
