= Teucinde of Arles =

Burgundian aristocrat

- Born: c. 928
- Died: c. 977
- Occupation: Artistocrat

Teucinde of Arles (or Theusinde, Teucinda; c. 928 – c. 977) was a Burgundian aristocrat who lived in Arles, Provence, and was known for her numerous donations to the Arles Church.

== Life ==
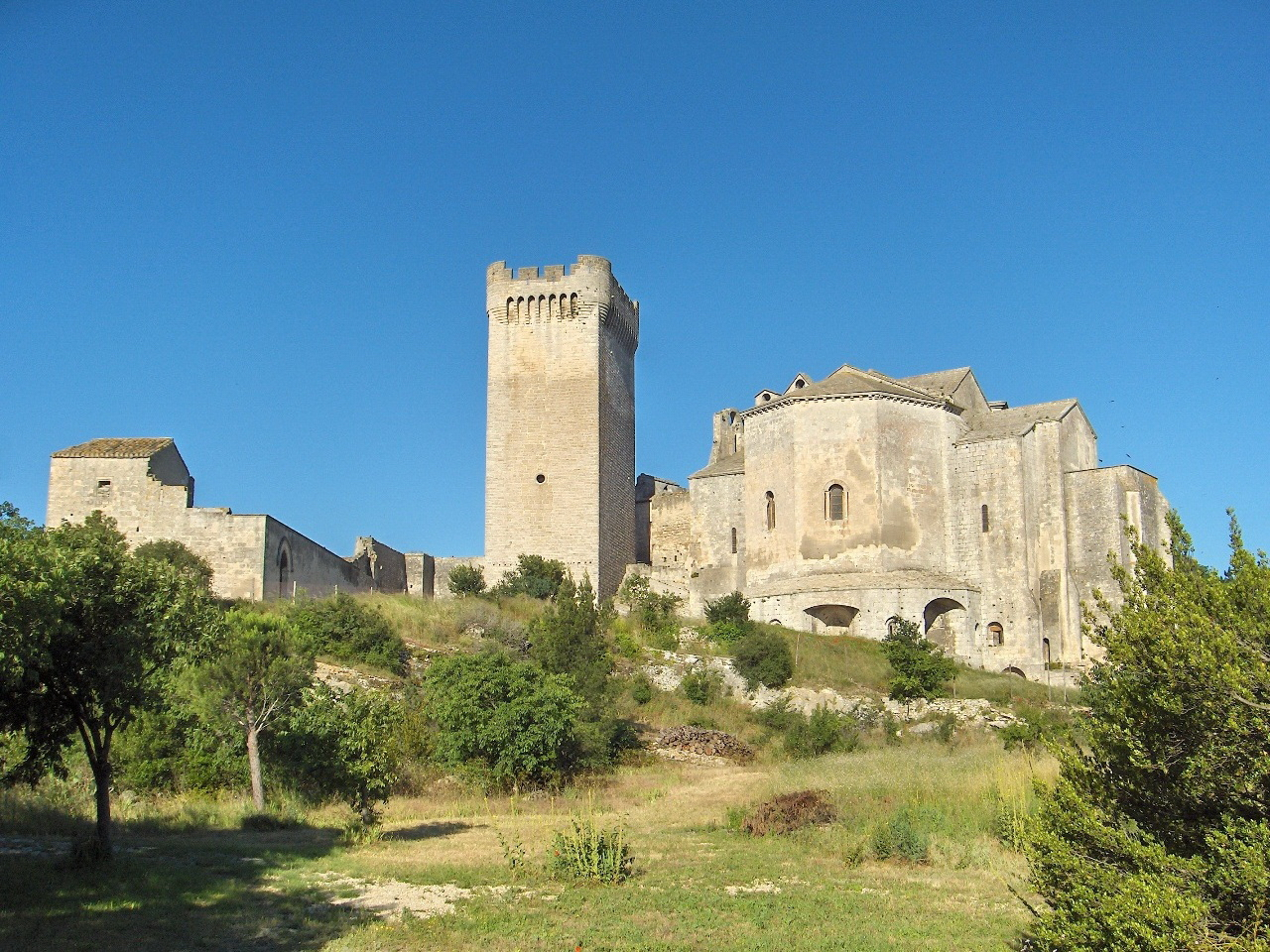
Montmajour Abbey was erected on a hill overlooking the marshy plain extending north of Arles.

Teucinde was a woman of the Burgundian aristocracy who followed Hugues d'Arles to Provence and belonged to the family of the counts of Cavaillon. She was the daughter of the Count of Apt, known by the nickname of Griffon, (Note: The Count of Apt, known only by his nickname "Griffon", in 972 delegated to his sons the task of leading the second army corps of William II, Count of Provence. After the conquest, they received as an endowment a large part of the limestone Prealps and also part of the crystalline Alps of the high Nissard country, in the extension of the principality of Riez between Jabron and Vésubie. This domain included the two former dioceses of Sénez and Glandèves. This immense, mainly mountainous territory, one of the largest allocated, was also "the poorest" and certainly the most difficult to manage.) appointed by King Conrad I of Burgundy in 948 or 949. Her brother was Gontard, (Note: Around 950 Gontard became bishop of Fréjus.) the provost of the Cathedral of Arles. Her nephew was Majolus, the fourth abbot of Cluny.

A very pious woman, whom some texts describe as a sancto monialis or Deo devota, (Note: Deo devota ("Devoted to God") widow or virgin who became a nun.) Teucinde distributed her goods to the religious communities of Arles under the archbishops of Arles, Manasses and Ithier. On 7 October 949, she bought the island of Montmajour, (Note: At the time, the site of Montmajour was an island because it was surrounded by marshes.) which belonged to the archbishopric of Arles, and donated it to the Benedictine monks who lived there. Montmajour Abbey was founded there. Teucinde confirmed this donation in her will in 977. On 19 July 973 Teucinde obtained from Archbishop Ithier the concession of Saint-Hippolyte near Arles for her and her nephew Riculf, (Note: Riculf, nephew of Gondard, succeeded him in this bishopric and around 990 became Abbot of Montmajour.) Bishop of Fréjus. They were to rebuild it, restore it, and own it until the end of their days.

Teucinde's gravestone was found in the 1970s on private property near Montmajour Abbey.

== Sources ==
- Aurell, Martin; Boyer, Jean-Paul; Coulet, Noël (7 July 2017), La Provence au Moyen Age, Presses universitaires de Provence
- "Insulam Sancti Petri que nominatur a Monte Majori", Archives départementales des Bouches-du-Rhône 2H11
