= Laugier of Nice =

Lord of Nice

- Born: c. 950
- Died: 1032
- Occupation: Aristocrat

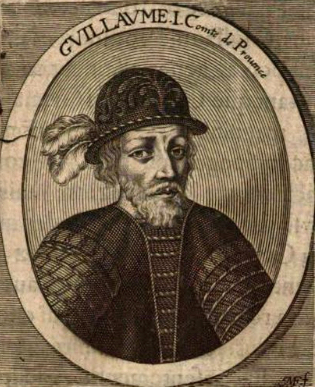
William I of Provence. Laugier de Nice (950-1032) was the husband of Odile of Provence and son-in-law of William I of Provence.

Laugier of Nice, known as the Roux (c. 950–1032), is also known as Laugier of Orange-Mévouillon or Laugier of Vence. He was co-lord of Nice, Gréolières, Cagnes and Vence. He held these titles in part through his wife Odile of Provence and his father-in-law, William I of Provence. Laugier seems to be related to the Mévouillon-Orange lineage. Some historians give him the title of viscount. He was a member of the first house of the counts of Orange-Nice. From 1023 Laugier was a monk of the order of Cluny.

== Family ==
Laugier was a member of the first house of the counts of Orange-Nice, as were his brothers Féraud de Nice, Pierre de Mirabel, both bishops and Pons III de Mevouillon, ancestor of the Mevouillon family.

Their father was Pons II de Mevouillon, precarist (Note: In Roman law a precarist is someone who holds a property in precarium. They have full rights to use the property, but must return it to the owner on demand.) of the church of Arles in Nyons. He was confirmed as owner of the villa Jocondis (Mornas), which had been granted in precarium to his parents by Archbishop Manasses of Arles in 954. We can therefore assume he was an adult at that time, and he lived at least until 983. The Archbishop Ithier of Arles gave him the villa Niomes and property in Busayrol, located in the county of Vaison. In 981, this precarium was confirmed to him by Annon, successor of Ithier, as well as by his two sons Pons III and Laugier of Nice. The Pons who donated to Cluny Abbey in 956–957 may have been Pons II de Mevouillon. Pons II and his wife Richilde, a native of Uzège, received the abbey of Sainte Marie de Goudargues from the archbishop of Arles.

Pons II de Mevouillon had eight sons who made a donation to Cluny Abbey in 1023. The charter of Cluny, no. 2779, of 22 May 1023, given in council in Saint-Privat in the territory of Sarrians, gives the first names of the eight brothers whose domains extended over the dioceses of Gap, Die, Vaison, Orange and Saint-Paul Trois Châteaux. By this act, two of the brothers, Féraud and Pons, having determined to become monks in Cluny, give Cluny Abey half of the castrum of Auton, the other half of which had been previously offered to Cluny Abbey by their father. This gift was made on the advice and with the consent of their brothers, to whom they abandoned the remainder of their inheritance. These six brothers were Féraud of Nice, Bishop of Gap, Pierre of Mirabel, Bishop of Vaison, Arnoul, Gérard, Raoul and Rambaud.

== After the Reconquest of Nice ==
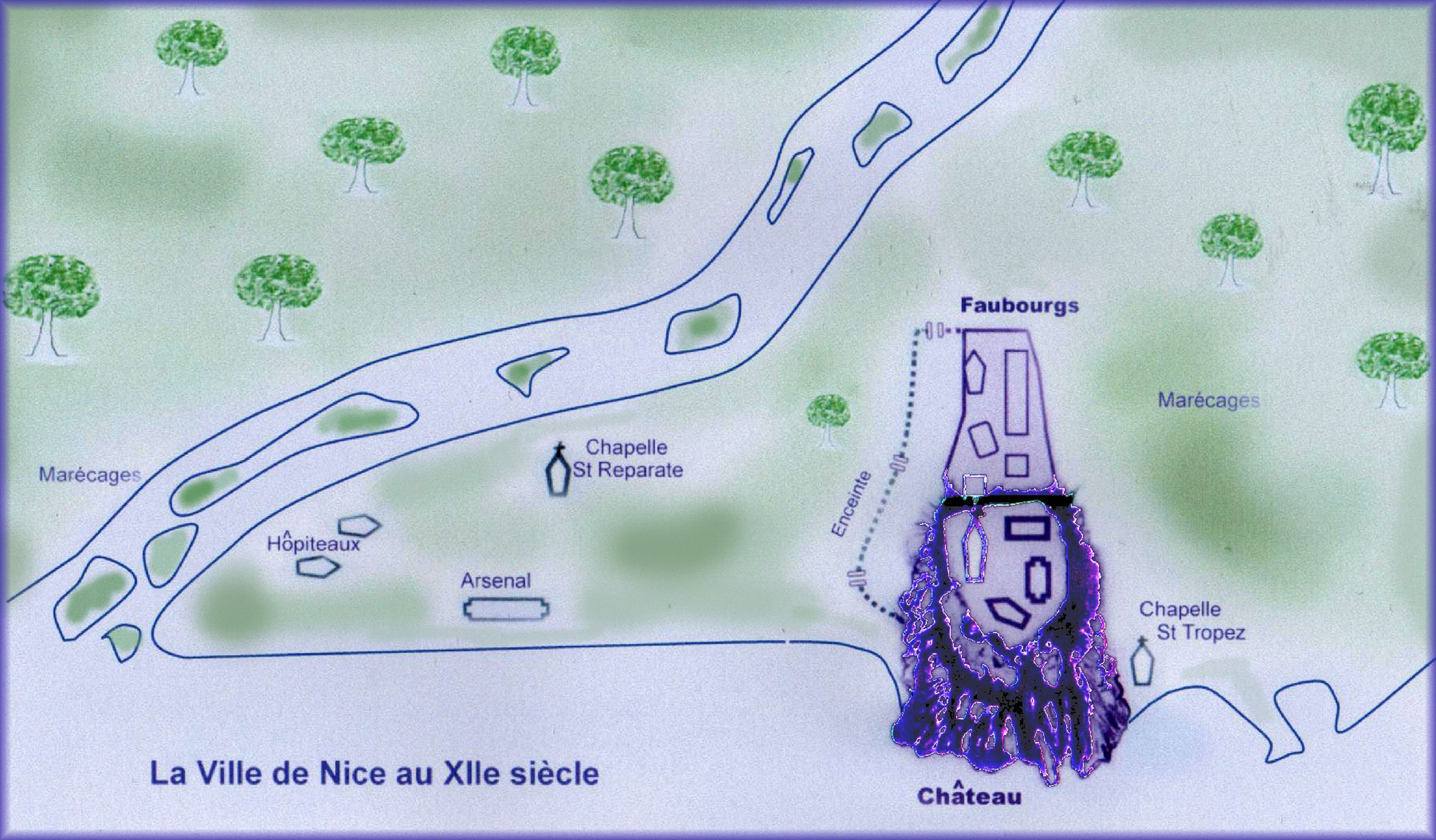
The Castle of Nice

The Reconquista of Spain has a French equivalent, which is less well known. At the end of the year 972, an expedition commanded by counts William I of Provence and Rotboald I of Provence, helped by Ardouin, Count of Turin, expelled the Saracens from Fraxinetum. The country around Nice, and the whole of eastern Provence, was now nullius land, a land of conquest. Count William carved out fiefs which he granted to his followers. The count kept the castle of Nice, of which his daughter Odile and her second husband Laugier of Nice were the Castellans, as can be seen from documents from the beginning of the twelfth century.

Laugier was described as rector of Nice in 981. He gave land to the cathedral of Nice in 1003. He was co-lord of Vence around 1005, so he is also known as Laugier of Vence, but should not be confused with Laugier Ruffi who defended Vence against the Saracens and who gave his daughter as a ransom in 973. We know that Laugier was a rich and powerful landowner from the Alps whose second marriage was to Odile of Provence, widow of Miron of Nice. He became co-lord of Nice, but not viscount, according to archival documents.

From 1023 Laugier was a monk of the order of Cluny. His father-in-law had given charge of the villa of Sarrians to the abbey so it could build a church. From 1023 until his death, Laugier of Nice directed the work, which ended in 1037. A charter tells us that Laugier and Odile donated Revest to the Abbey of St Pons in 1029. Laugier and his wife Odile made donations to the monastery of Saint Véran and to the church of Notre-Dame-la-Dorée, near the Loup River in the diocese of Vence in 1032.

== Marriage and descendants ==
Odile de Provence from her second marriage with Laugier had the following children:

- Rambaud of Nice, or Orange
- Rostan of Gréolières, co-lord of Vence, lord of Gréolières
- Pierre of Nice, bishop of Sisteron (1043-1059)
- Jauccara of Nice, married to Amic de Vence-Avignon
- Gerberge of Nice, married to Viscount Bérenger of Avignon

The three brothers gave the cathedral of Nice the churches of Sainte-Marie d'Olivula in Villefranche, Sainte-Marie de Beaulieu and Saint-Jean, near Saint-Hospice. They also enriched the monastery of Saint-Pons in Nice and the abbey of La Dorade, as well as the church of Vence.

== Descendants of Pons of Mevouillon ==
 Pons of Mevouillon
 m. Blismodis  
 |→ Humbert, Bishop of Vaison until 1005 
 |→ Garnier, Bishop of Avignon (976–991) 
 |→ Ison
 |→ Pons II of Mevouillon (ca 920–986)
       m. Richilde, from Uzège
       |→ Féraud de Nice  Bishop of Gap
       |→ Pierre of Mirabel  Bishop of Vaison
       |→ Pons III of Mevouillon (ancestor of the Mevouillon family) ...
       |→ Arnoul of Theys (ancestor of the Theys family) ...
       |→ Gérard
       |→ Rambaud 
       |→ Raoul
       |→ Laugier of Nice (ca 950–1032) 
             m. Odile (976–1032), daughter of William I of Provence
             |→ Rostan of Gréolières (ancestor of the Gréolières family) ...
             |→ Pierre, Bishop of Sisteron (1043–1059) 
             |→ Jauccara m. Amic of Vence-Avignon
             |→ Gerberge m. Bérenger of Avignon. 
             |→ Rambaud of Nice (1006-1073) 
                    m. 1032 Accelena of Apt 
                    |→ Laugier of Apt m. Amancia of Lacoste-Castellane
                    |→ Odila m. Boniface of Reillanne
                    |→ Gisla 
                          m. Rostang of Agoult
                          |→  Laugier of Agout, Bishop of Apt 
                    |→ Pierre II of Nice, Bishop of Sisteron, then Bishop of Vaison
                    |→ Rostan of Fréjus m. Accelena of Marignane
                    |→ Rambaud, Lord of Gréolières (died young)
                    m. Bélieldis of Marseille
                    |→ Amic 
                    |→ Guillaume 
                    m. before 1045 Azalaïs of Reillanne, widow of Guilhem of Agoult 
                    |→ Bertrand-Rambaud of Orange 
                          m. 1068 Adélaïde of Cavenez, widow of William Bertrand of Provence
                          |→ Léger or Laugerus, Bishop of Avignon (1124, 1126–1142)
                          |→ Jausserand Laugier, Lord of Gréolières	 
                          m. 1064 Gerberge, daughter of Fulk Bertrand of Provence
                          |→ Pierre
                          |→ Rambaud II of Orange 
                                |→ Thiburge of Orange 
                                     m. 1126 William of Omélas, son of William V of Montpellier 
                                      |→ Raimbaut d'Orange

== Sources ==
- Albanès (1899), Gallia Christiana Novissima, vol. III: Arles, Montbéliard
- "Chroniques de Haute-Provence", Bulletin de la Société Scientifique et Littéraire des Alpes de Haute-Provence (330–331), 1996
- Daremberg; Saglio (1919), "Precarium", Dictionnaire des Antiquités Grecques et Romaines (in French), Paris: Hachette Livre
- Didier, Noël (1954), Les églises de Sisteron et de Forcalquier du xie siècle à la Révolution : le problème de la « concathédralité » (in French), Libr. Dalloz
- Poly, J.-P. (1976), La Provence et la société féodal (879-1166) (in French), Paris
- Riche, Denyse (2000), L'ordre de Cluny à la fin du moyen âge: le vieux pays clunisien, XIIe-XVe siècles, Université de Saint-Étienne
- Ripert-Montclar (1907), Cartulaire de la Commanderie de Richerenches de l'Ordre du Temple (1136-1214) (in French), Avignon, p. XXIV
- Rossi, Edmond (2002), Les Légendes et Chroniques insolites des Alpes Maritimes (in French), Saint Rémy de Provence: Equinoxe-éditions
- Salvetti, Bonaventure (2003), L'abbaye de Saint-Pons: hors les murs de Nice : essai historique (in French), SERRE EDITEUR
- Tisserand, Eugène (1862), Chronique de Provence: histoire civile et religieuse de la cité de Nice et du Département des Alpes-Maritimes (in French), vol. 1–2, Visconti et Delbecchi
- Varano, Maria Cristina (9 July 2008), "Réformer l'Eglise, réformer l'Etat : une quête de légitimité (XIe-XIVe siècle)", Institution épiscopale et autorité comtale dans le diocèse de Sisteron, Rives Nord-Méditerranéennes (28), doi:10.4000/rives.1143, archived from the original on 8 July 2008
