= Ghibbelin of Arles =

Ghibbelin of Sabran (also spelled Gibelin) (c. 1045 – 1112) was Archbishop of Arles (1080–1112), papal legate (1107–1108), and Latin Patriarch of Jerusalem (1108–1112).

== Biography ==
Ghibbelin was named Archbishop of Arles at the Council of Avignon in 1080, at which Archbishop Aicard was deposed. He was consecrated by Pope Gregory VII. However, the clergy and people of Arles preferred Aicard, a relative of the viscounts of Marseille who had taken the side of Henry IV, Holy Roman Emperor against Gregory VII. Although Ghibbelin was supported by Bertrand I, Count of Provence, he was unable to take possession of his archdiocese. He was threatened by the citizens of Arles when he approached he city, and had to renounce his claim.

Ghibbelin waited many years to take his post. In 1096, when Pope Urban II toured southern France before preaching the First Crusade at the Council of Clermont, he neglected to visit Arles. After 1096 Ghibbelin was able to occupy the archdiocese during the periodic absences of Aicard; meanwhile he also directed the diocese of Avignon. He finally succeeded Aicard around 1098, when Urban II overturned the renouncement he had made under duress from the citizens of Arles in 1080. In 1105, the will of Raymond IV of Toulouse ordered his heirs to restore everything he had usurped from Ghibbelin in Arles, Argence, Fourques, Albaron, and Fos.

At the end of 1107, Ghibbelin left Arles for Palestine, as papal legate for Pope Paschal II. He was sent to settle a dispute over the Patriarchate of Jerusalem. Dagobert of Pisa had been deposed as Patriarch in 1102 and replaced by Ehremar. The pope reinstated Dagobert, who then died before he could return to Palestine. The pope was now inclined to reinstate Ehremar, but King of Jerusalem, Baldwin I, objected as he regarded him as incompetent, and Ghibbelin was chosen to decide the matter. He deposed Ehremar, and at the invitation of Baldwin himself accepted the office. He died there in December, 1112, and was succeeded by Arnulf of Chocques as Patriarch, while the archdiocese of Arles remained vacant until 1115.

Catholic Church titles
Preceded by Dagobert of Pisa	Latin Patriarch of Jerusalem; 1108–1112	Succeeded by Arnulf of Chocques
