= Archdiocese of Arles =

Roman Catholic archdiocese in France

Coordinates: 43.6767°N 4.6278°E

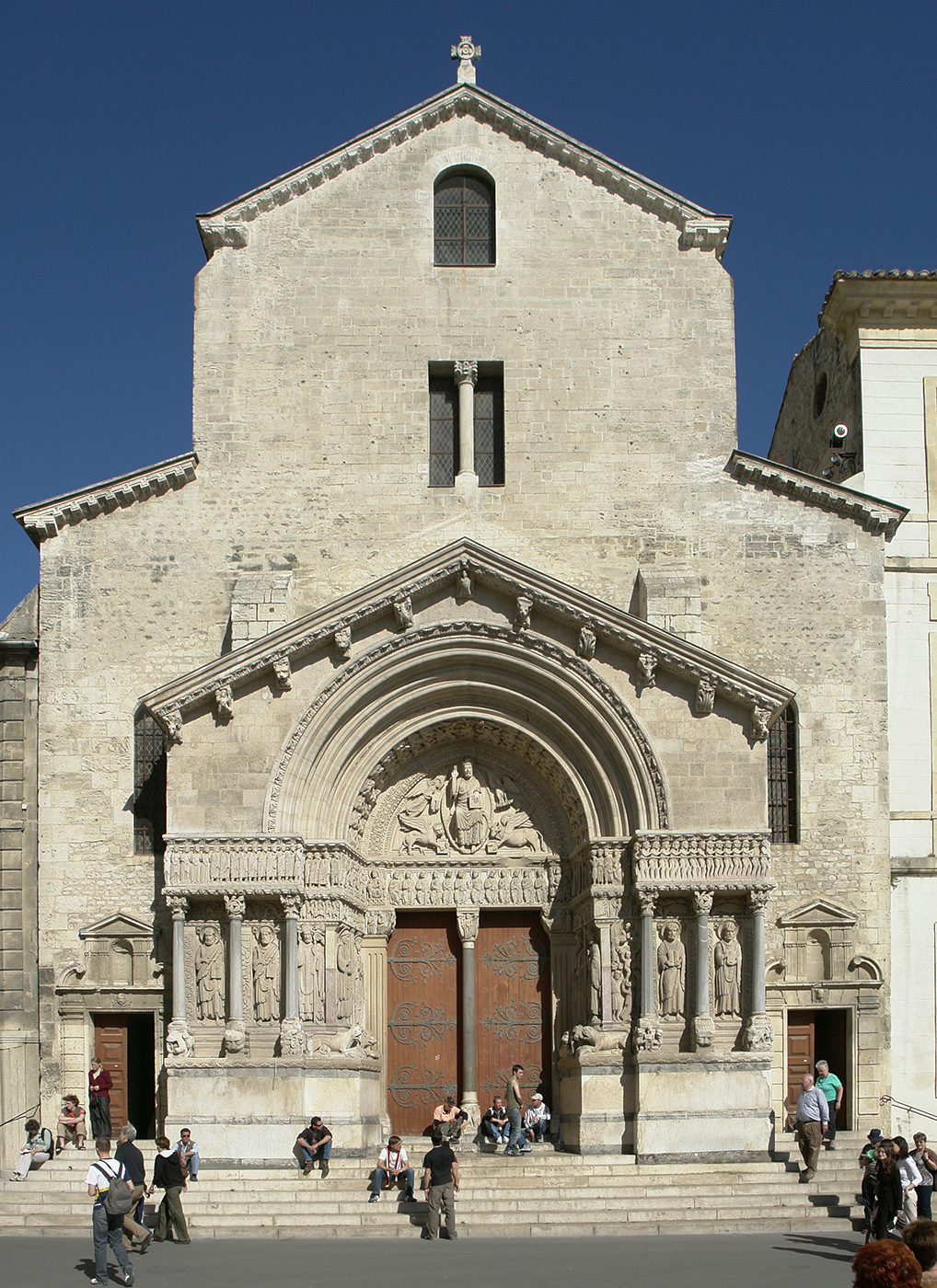
The former cathedral of St. Trophime, in Arles.

The former French Catholic Archbishopric of Arles had its episcopal seat in the city of Arles, in southern France. At the apex of the delta (Camargue) of the Rhone River, some 40 miles from the sea, Arles grew under Liburnian, Celtic, and Punic influences, until, in 46 B.C., a Roman military veteran colony was founded there by Tiberius Claudius Nero, under instructions from Julius Caesar. For centuries, the archbishops of Arles were regional leaders in creating and codifying canon law, through councils and synods.

The diocese was suppressed in 1822, fulfilling a condition in the Concordat of 1817 with King Louis XVIII.

== Diocesan history ==
The bishopric of Arles was founded before the middle of the third century. Its status as a metropolitan archdiocese was defined by Pope Leo I in 450. Its suffragans were the dioceses of: Orange, Avignon, Carpentras, Cavaillon, Marseille, Toulon, Saint-Paul-trois-chateaux, and Vaison. The archdiocese was suppressed a first time under the first French republic, to become part of the Metropolitan Archdiocese of Aix. The diocese was restored by Pope Pius VII in the concordat with King Louis XVIII on 11 June 1817.

The Archbishopric of Arles was suppressed again by Pius VII on 6 October 1822 in the bull "Paternae Charitatis", carrying out the commitments he had made in the apostolic letter to Louis XVIII in 1817. Its territory was incorporated into the Archdiocese of Aix. The latter is since officially called "Archdiocese of Aix (-Arles-Embrun)" and is no longer a Metropolitan but an archiepiscopal title, within the ecclesiastical province of Marseille.

=== Early councils ===
The first Council of Arles was held in 314, at the urging of the Emperor Constantine, for the purpose of putting an end to the Donatist controversy. Several bishops were invited by Constantine personally, including the bishop of Syracuse. Bishops from the western part of the empire including three from Britain attended. Claims that 600 or 300 bishops were present cannot be sustained; the synodial letter to Pope Sylvester was signed by thirty-three bishops, and a number of priests and deacons who held the proxies of bishops who did not attend. Archbishop Marinus of Arles presided, apparently on the appointment of Constantine. The synod confirmed the findings of the Council of Rome (313), recognizing the validity of the election of Caecilian of Carthage, and confirmed the excommunication of Donatus of Casae Nigrae. Its twenty-two canons dealing with various abuses that had crept into ecclesiastical life since the persecution of Diocletian (284–305) are important documents of early ecclesiastical legislation.

In 353, the Emperor Constantius II campaigned against the imperial usurper Magnus Magnentius, who had killed his brother, the Emperor Constans. After the suicide of Magnentius, following his defeat in the Battle of Mons Seleucus, Constantius took up his residence in Arles. Pope Liberius sent ambassadors to him, requesting permission to hold a council in Aquileia, but Constantius instead summoned a council which met in Arles. It was agreed beforehand that a compromise in which the orthodox Athanasius of Alexandria would be condemned, but that Arianism would also be condemned. The majority of the council, including Constantius himself and Archbishop Saturninus of Arles, was decidedly Arian in attitude. The two papal legates were compelled to reject communion with Athanasius, but the council refused to condemn Arius, an act which deeply disturbed the pope. In 356, Archbishop Saturninus held another council at Béziers, where he attempted to turn the bishops against the orthodox Bishop Hilary of Poitiers, but with no success.

In the synod of 443 (or 452), attended also by bishops of neighbouring provinces, fifty-six canons were formulated, mostly repetitions of earlier disciplinary decrees. Neophytes were excluded from major orders; married men aspiring to the priesthood were required to promise a life of continency, and it was forbidden to consecrate a bishop without the assistance of three other bishops and the consent of the metropolitan (Canon 5).

A council, called the third council of Arles, was held on 30 December of some year between 449 and 462, presided over by Archbishop Ravennius and including twelve other bishops, to settle the differences that had arisen between Faustus, Abbot of Lérins, and Theodorus Bishop of Fréjus.

Apropos of the conflict between the archiepiscopal See of Vienne and Arles a council was held in the latter city in 463, which had earlier called forth a famous letter from Pope Leo I (440–461), defining the metropolitan status of Arles.

Between 475 and 480 another council was called by Archbishop Leontius, attended by thirty bishops, in which the teachings of the priest Lucidus on pre-destination were condemned.

On 6 June 524, on the occasion of the consecration of the basilica in honor of the Virgin Mary outside the walls of Arles, a council of fourteen bishops and four priest delegates, was held under the presidency of Archbishop Caesarius of Arles; its four canons deal chiefly with the conferring of clerical orders. A number of Caesarius of Arles' works have been published in Sources Chrétiennes.

The synod of Arles of 29 June 554 was presided over by Archbishop Sapandus, with eighteen other bishops or their proxies in attendance. The synod was mostly concerned with relegislating the canons of earlier synods, especially concerning the discipline of the regular and secular clergy. Another synod may have taken place, possibly in 682.

On 3 February 557, Pope Pelagius I wrote to Archbishop Sapaudus, sending him the pallium and naming him Apostolic Vicar for all Gaul.

The liturgical uses of Arles were recommended by pope Gregory the Great as a model for Augustine of Canterbury.

=== Carolingian Councils ===
An important council was held at Arles on 10 May 813, one of five held at the instigation of Charlemagne, for the correction of abuses and the reestablishment of ecclesiastical discipline. Archbishop Jean of Arles and Archbishop Nebridius of Narbonne presided as missi dominici of the emperor. Its decrees insist on a sufficient ecclesiastical education of bishops and priests, on the duty of both to preach frequently to the people and to instruct them in the Catholic Faith, on the obligation of parents to instruct their children, etc.

In 1034 a meeting was held at Arles, in the nature of a revivalist meeting, for the re-establishment of peace, the restoration of Christian Faith, the awakening in the popular heart of a sense of divine goodness and of salutary fear by the consideration of past evils. Meetings were being held all over France, from the beginning of the millennium, inspired by the people and eagerly embraced by the bishops.

From 1080 to 1098, Aicard continued to act as bishop even though he had been deposed. He was followed on the episcopal throne by Ghibbelin of Sabran, who was later Latin patriarch of Jerusalem.

=== Archbishop Baussan's councils ===
On 10 July 1234, a council was held in Arles under the presidency of Archbishop Jean Baussan. It issued twenty-four canons, mostly against the prevalent Albigensian heresy, and for the observance of the decrees of the Lateran Council of 1215 and that of Toulouse in 1229. Close inspection of their dioceses is urged on the bishops, as a remedy against the spread of heresy; testaments are declared invalid unless made in the presence of the parish priest. This measure, met with in other councils, was meant to prevent testamentary dispositions in favour of known heretics. On 11 November 1236, Archbishop Jean held another council, in which the canons of the council of 1234 were republished.

In 1251, Archbishop Jean Baussan (1233–1258)of Arles, held a provincial council near Avignon (Concilium Insculanum), six of his suffragan bishops being present, and two absent. Every bishop was expected to have a diocesan inquisition of heretics, established according to canon law and by the authority of the provincial council and the bishop himself; they should use the Dominican Order as their agents (Canon 2). The bishops were to take chazrge of the property of heretics (Canon 3). Once an excommunication is pronounced in canonical form, it is to be observed by all, with a fine extracted from violators (Canon 4). Clandestine marriages are prohibited; a marriage must be celebrated in conformity to canon law (Canon 13).

=== Election of 1262 ===
Archbishop Bertrand de Malferrat died on 25 May 1262. The Chapter issued the customary summons for the attendance of all who wished, were obligated to, and were able, to attend the meeting for the election of a new bishop. When the votes were cast, disagreement appeared. Some chose Raimundus, the Provost of the cathedral Chapter, while the rest chose Robert de Ucena, a canon of Valence and a papal chaplain, who was only in minor orders. The Provost sent his procurator along with two canons representing the Chapter to the papal court, where Pope Urban IV (Jacques Pantaléon of Troyes) was living in exile from Rome. Raimundus' procurator renounced every right that Raimundus had in the election. The two canons then in their own names and those of others in the Chapter asked Pope Urban to appoint Robert de Ucena. Good reports were presented as to his education and character, but the pope decided not to appoint him. Instead, he chose to transfer the bishop of Akko-Ptolemais (Acre), Florentius, who had carried out useful work there and provided good example in the midst of many troubles.

=== Archbishop Florentinus' councils ===
In 1263, a council held by Archbishop Florentinus decreed that the sacrament of confirmation must be received while fasting; and that on Sundays and feast days the religious orders should not open their churches to the faithful, nor preach at the hour of the parish Mass. The laity should be instructed by their parish priests in the proper form of baptism in case of necessity. Marriage should not take place without ecclesiastical participation; failure to observe this requirement brought excommunication. Jewish leaders were not to go about in public in garb that resembled that of priests. Members of the religious orders should also frequent the parochial service, for the sake of good example. This council in particular condemned the doctrines spread abroad under the name of Joachim of Flora.

Archbishop Florentius held a council, probably in 1264, which promulgated seventeen canons.

In 1275, twenty-two earlier observances were promulgated anew at a provincial Council of Arles, held by Archbishop Bernard de Languissel (1274–1281).

On 16–17 May 1279, Archbishop Bernard de Languissel (1274–1281) presided over a provincial council at which four other bishops participated, and four bishops were absent but represented by procurators. Fifteen canons wefre promulgated.

Archbishop Guillaume de La Garde (1361–1374) presided at a regional council of the ecclesiastical provinces of Arles, Embrun, and Aix; it was held in the cathedral of Apt from 14 to 30 May 1365. He also held a diocesan synod in Spring 1370, on the second Sunday after Easter, 30 April.

=== Religious developments ===
On 1 February 1324, Archbishop-elect Jean Baussan authorized the Franciscan Provincial of Provence to construct a church, a religious house, and a cemetery at Salon (Sallonis) on land donated by Pierre Baston.

Archbishop Pierre de Cros (1374–1388) was mostly an absentee pastor, since he served at the Papal Court as Chamberlain of the Holy Roman Church for Pope Gregory XI, Pope Urban VI (briefly), and Pope Clement VII. He was still Chamberlain on 8 May 1382. He was named a cardinal by Clement VII on 23 December 1383. He was succeeded in the office of Chamberlain by Bishop François Conzié of Grenoble by 31 March 1384. Conzié assisted at the deathbed of Clement VII on 16 September 1394, and was reappointed Chamberlain S. R. E. by Pope Benedict XIII (Avignon Obedience).

==== Jesuits ====
In 1607, King Henri IV granted Arles permission to establish a Jesuit collège (high school) in the city, a project which the city council had been discussing since 1601. The Jesuits were greatly favored by Archbishop Oratio Montano (1598–1603), who regularly invited them to preach during Lent and Eastertide. In 1606, Archbishop Gaspard du Laurent (1603–1630) reached an agreement with the Jesuit superior in Aix to establish a house of Jesuits in Arles. In 1625, the Jesuits rented a house in Arles. In 1633, Archbishop Jean Jaubert de Barrault (1630–1643) assigned the church of S. Vincent to the Jesuits, along with the priest's residence, where they established themselves until the college was opened. After difficulties about finances and details of courses, agreement was reached in October 1636 for the Jesuits to provide seven teachers, who would offer courses in philosophy, theology, the humanities, and grammar. King Louis XIII issued letters patent in 1637 which made them masters of the college without restrictions.

In 1762, the Parliament of Paris declared the constitution of the Society of Jesus void, and ordered the members of the Society to leave their colleges within a week. In 1764, King Louis XV confirmed the decree, and the Society was completely suppressed.

=== Election of 1410 ===
Archbishop Artaud de Mélan died on 1 November 1410, and was buried on 5 November. The Provost, Étienne Langlade, and the members of the Chapter of the cathedral, sent out summonses to the interested parties that an electoral assembly would be held on 10 November, but on 9 November, Louis Comte de Provence and lord of Arles sent word that he would be unable to attend on that day. The meeting was therefore put back to 13 November. Two canons failed to appear on the 13th, and they were therefore cited to appear on the 14th. Finally, the election resulted in ten votes being cast for Bishop Paul de Sade of Marseille, one vote for the Provost Étienne Langlade by his nephew, who was a canon, and one vote, that of the Provost, for Henri d'Avaugour, a close advisor of the King of Sicily. The archdeacon thereupon moved that they make a formal request (postulation) for the transfer of Paul de Sade to the archdiocese of Arles.

To which pope, however, should the postulation be directed? There were three popes in 1410: Gregory XII of the Roman Obedience, Benedict XIII of the Avignon Obedience, and John XXIII who had been elected in Bologna by the cardinals who had participated in the Council of Pisa in 1409. The French monarchy supported the Avignon Obedience, and it was the Avignon pope Benedict XIII who had approved the election of Archbishop Artaud de Mélan on 17 December 1404. As the Western Schism dragged on and on, however, pressure mounted on King Charles VI of France from members of his own family, from his royal council, from the University of Paris, from prelates of the church and others, to act to bring the schism to an end. On 13 January 1408, it was announced that if the church were not returned again to the rule of a single pope by Ascension Day, then the kingdom of France would take the position of neutrality among the contenders, that is, rejecting the Obedience of Benedict XIII. Stimulated by Charles VI's announcement, Florence, Siena, and Venice immediately began discussion about joining the party of neutrality, that is, about rejecting the Obedience of Gregory XII. In mid-May 1408, seven cardinals of the Roman Obedience fled to Pisa from the papal court at Lucca, shocked at the perjury and violence of Gregory XII and his nephews; they were soon joined by two more cardinals. At the end of June, they and three cardinals of the Avignon Obedience met at Livorno, and signed a document calling for a General Council of the church to end the schism.

Archbishop Artaud de Mélan did not attend the Council of Pisa (March–July 1409), but sent a procurator to represent him. The fifth session of the council, on 5 June 1409, excommunicated and anathematized both Gregory XII and Benedict XIII as notorious schismatics, heretics, and perjurers.

When the electors of Bishop Paul de Sade of Marseille to be archbishop of Arles requested his confirmation, it was not Benedict XIII to whom they applied, since he had been rejected both by the king of France and by the Council of Pisa. In November 1410, their only recourse was to John XXIII. But Pope John announced that, while Archbishop Artaud was still alive, he had reserved the appointment of the next archbishop of Arles to himself, and therefore, on 24 November 1410, he named Cardinal Jean Allarmet de Brogny as Perpetual Apostolic Administrator of the archdiocese. On 27 December 1410, Pierre Fabri, Dean of the cathedral Chapter of Gap and procurator of Cardinal de Brogny, took possession of the archdiocese on behalf of the cardinal.

Archbishop Jean Jaubert de Barrault (1630–1643) participated in the general assembly of the French clergy in Paris in 1635–1636, and chaired some of the sessions in the absence of the archbishop of Bordeaux.

=== The French Revolution ===
The National Constituent Assembly decreed the abolition of monastic vows and the suppression of religious orders on 13 February 1790, and a decree fixing pensions for monks who left their monasteries was voted on 20 February. At the time of the dissolution of the monasteries in 1791, the archdiocese of Arles had only two Benedictine monasteries, the abbatia Montis Majoris (Saint Pierre-de-Montmayour) for men, and Saint-Césaire-d'Arles for women.

On 12 July 1790, the Constituent Assembly legislated the Civil Constitution of the Clergy, a document which completely nationalized the Catholic Church in France, and separated it entirely from the government of the Papacy. All dignities, canons, prebends, and chaplanships in cathedrals and collegiate churches were abolished; all regular and secular Chapters were abolished; all abbeys and priories of either sex were abolished. Bishops, and priests as well, were to be elected, in the same manner as representatives to the departmental assembly, that is, by specially qualified citizens, who did not have to be clerics, or even Christians; a bishop-elect must not apply to the pope for confirmation. Due to strong opposition both from clergy and laity, the National Assembly passed a law on 27 November 1790, requiring the clergy to swear an oath to the Constitution of France; refusal would bring dismissal from office, loss of income, and prosecution. Of the 133 bishops of France, only four took the oath, while 129, including Archbishop Jean Marie du Lau of Arles, did not.

After repeated attempts to convince King Louis XVI not to sign the Civil Constitution of the Clergy, Pope Pius VI finally addressed the urgent requests of one bishop after another to intervene. On 13 April 1791, he issued the apostolic letter "Charitas quae," which condemned both the Civil Constitution as heretical and schismatic, and constructed specifically to destroy the Catholic Church, and the oath which was being used to harass those who refused to take it.

Because of their refusal to take the oath, both Archbishop de Lau of Arles and Archbishop Jean de Boisgelin de Cucé of Aix were deposed by the French government, and in fulfilment of earlier plans, the diocese of Arles was suppressed and its territory added to that of Aix. Aix became the seat of the new metropolitanate called the "Bouches du Rhone." On 19 February 1791, the electors of the metropolitanate met at Aix, and elected Charles-Benoît Roux, the curé of Eyragues near Arles. In the meantime, the two deposed archbishops devoted their energies to rallying their non-juring clergy, and the inhabitants of the "Bouches du Rhone," a large number of whom were hostile to the policies and excesses of the government in Paris. The directors of the department, noted for their anticatholic attitudes, became aware of the archbishops' activities, and on 16 November 1791 wrote to the ecclesiastical committee in Paris and to the National Assembly that they were organizing a counter-revolutionary movement with a view to civil war.

The National Assembly passed a law on 27 May 1792, deporting all non-juring clergy from France immediately. Clerics who remained in France after their deportation was ordered, or who returned to France after deportation, were subject to imprisonment for ten years. Archbishop de Lau of Arles was in Paris that summer, in connection with an address which he had written to persuade the king not to sign the law of 29 May. On 11 August he was arrested at the Hôtel de Châtillon, rue du Petit-Bourbon, where he was residing, on orders of the Luxembourg section. Incriminating papers were found in his rooms, and he was therefore sent that evening to the church of the Carmelites, where there were already some sixty clerics incarcerated, and put on a diet of bread and water. On 2 September 1792, at the instigation of Jean-Lambert Tallien, who had given a fiery address in the National Assembly on 31 August, De Lau and 180 other clerics, were massacred in what came to be called the September Massacres.

== Archbishops ==
=== Before 1000 ===
- Trophimus of Arles (c. 250 – c. 280)
- Marcianus (attested 254/57)
- Marinus (attested 313–314)
- Saturninus (Arian; bef. 355 – 362/63)
- Concordius (attested 374)
- Ingenuus of Arles (attested 396)
- Heros of Arles (attested 412)
- Patroclus (412–426)
- Euladius (Helladius) (426)
- Honoratus (427–429)
- Hilary of Arles (430–449)
- Ravennius (attested 449–452)
- Leontius (attested 461 – 475)
- Aeonius (attested 494–500)
- Caesarius of Arles (503–542)
- Auxianus (542–546)
- Aurelianus (c. 546 – 551)
- Sapaudus (attested 552–586)
- Licerius (586–588)
- Virgilius of Arles (attested 588–601)
- Cyprianus (c. 613)
- Florianus (attested 613–614)
- Theodosius (attested 632–650)
- Johannes I (attested 659–668)
- Felix (attested 680)
- Wolbert (attested 683)
- Aurelius
- Polycarpus
- Martinus
- Protasius
- Innodius
- Georgius
- Ratbertus
- Kavisarius (Kavilarius)
- Virimarius (Wilimarus)
- Wiliaris (Viriarich)
- Arladis (Arladidius)
- Elifantus (attested 788)
- Johannes (II) (attested 811–816)
- Notho (attested 824–844)
- Rotlandus (bef. 852 – 869)
- Rostagnus (attested 871–913)
- Manasses (attested 920–961)
- Iterius (attested 963)
- Anno (c. 980–994)

=== 1000–1300 ===
- Pons de Marignane (1005–1029)
- Raimbaud de Reillanne (May 1030 – 18 February 1069)
- Aicard (1070 – 1080 or 1096?)
- Gibelin (1080 or 1099–1107, 1112 or 1115)
- Atton de Bruniquel (6 October 1115 – 6 March 1129)
- Bernard Guerin / Garin (1129 – 2 March 1138)
- Guillaume Monge (1139? – 1 January 1142)
- Raimon de Montredon (1142–1160)
- Raimon de Bollène (1163–1182)
- Pierre Isnard (1183–1190)
- Imbert d'Eyguière (9 October 1191 – 20 July 1202)
- Michel de Morèse (1202–1217)
- Hugues (1217)
- Hugo Béroard (27 March 1218 – 18 November 1232)
- Jean Baussan (27 July 1233 – 24 November 1258)
- Bertrand de Malferrat (25 November 1258 – 25 May 1262)
- Florent (28 November 1262 – 7 June 1266)
- Bertran de Saint-Martin (11 October 1266 – June 1273)
- Bernard de Languissel (4 February 1274 – 1281)
- Bertrand Amalric (20 December 1281 – 31 March 1286)
- Rostaing de la Capre (5 August 1286 – 22 August 1303)

=== 1300–1500 ===
- Peire de Ferrières (30 January 1304 – 21 September 1307)
- Arnaud de Faugères (1307 – 1309 or 1310)
- Gaillard de Faugères (19 December 1310 – 12 September 1317)
- Gaillard Saumate (1318–1323)
- Gasbert de la Val /du Val (1324–1341)
- Jean de Cardone (1341–1348)
- Étienne Aldebrand (1348–1350)
- Étienne de La Garde (1351–1361)
- Guillaume de La Garde (1361–1374)
- Pierre de Cros (1374–1388) (Avignon Obedience)

Melchior of Brunswick (1378) (Roman Obedience)

- François de Conzié (1388–1390) (Avignon Obedience)
- Jean de Rochechouart (1390–1398) (Avignon Obedience)
- Sede vacante (1398–1404)

♦ Harduin, Bishop of Angers (1400–1402) Apostolic administrator
♦ Guillaume le Tort, Bishop of Marseille (1402–1403) Apostolic administrator
♦ Philippe Sicard, Abbot of Aniane (1403–1404) Apostolic administrator

- Artaud de Mélan (1404–1410) (Avignon Obedience)
- Jean Allarmet de Brogny (1410–1423) (Avignon Obedience) Administrator
- Louis Aleman (1423–1450)
- Pierre de Foix (1450–1463)
- Philippe de Lévis (1463–1475)
- Eustache de Lévis (1475–1489)
- Nicolas de Cibo (1489–1499)
- Jean Ferrier I (1499–1521)

=== 1500–1792 ===
- Jean Ferrier II (1521–1550)
- Jacques du Broullat (1550–1560)
- Robert de Lenoncourt (1560–1561) Administrator
- Antoine d'Albon (1561–1562)
- Hippolyte d'Este (1562–1566)
- Prospero Santacroce (1566–1574)
- Silvio Santacroce (1574–1598)
- Oratio Montano (1598–1603)
- Gaspard du Laurent (1603–1630)
- Jean Jaubert de Barrault (1631–1643)
- François Adhémar de Monteil de Grignan (1644–1689)
- Jean-Baptiste Adhémar de Monteil de Grignan (1689–1697)
- François de Mailly (1698–1710)
- Jacques de Forbin-Janson (1711–1741)
- Jacques Bonne-Gigault de Bellefonds (1741–1746)
- Jean-Joseph de Jumilhac (1746 –1775)
- Jean Marie du Lau d'Allemans (1775–1792)

== See also ==
- Roman Catholic Archdiocese of Aix
- Catholic Church in France
- List of Catholic dioceses in France

== Sources ==
=== Lists of bishops ===
- Sainte-Marthe, Denis de (1716). Gallia christiana. (in Latin). Tomus primus. Paris: Typographia Regia 1716.
- Albanès, Joseph Hyacinthe; Ulysse Chevalier (1901). Gallia christiana novissima: Arles (in Latin). Valence: Soc. anonyme d'imprimerie montbéliardasie.
- Eubel, Conradus, ed. (1913). Hierarchia catholica (in Latin). Vol. 1 (Tomus I) (second ed.). Munster: Libreria Regensbergiana. p. 527.
- Eubel, Conradus, ed. (1914). Hierarchia catholica (in Latin). Vol. 2 (Tomus II) (second ed.). Munster: Libreria Regensbergiana.
- Eubel, Conradus, ed. (1923). Hierarchia catholica (in Latin). Vol. 3 (Tomus III) (second ed.). Munster: Libreria Regensbergiana.
- Gauchat, Patritius (Patrice) (1935). Hierarchia catholica (in Latin). Vol. 4 (IV) (1592–1667). Münster: Libraria Regensbergiana. p. 219.
- Ritzler, Remigius; Sefrin, Pirminus (1952). Hierarchia catholica medii et recentis aevi (in Latin). Vol. 5 (V) (1667–1730). Patavii: Messagero di S. Antonio.
- Ritzler, Remigius; Sefrin, Pirminus (1958). Hierarchia catholica medii et recentis aevi. Vol. 6 (Tomus VI) (1730–1799). Patavii: Messagero di S. Antonio.
- Ritzler, Remigius; Sefrin, Pirminus (1968). Hierarchia Catholica medii et recentioris aevi (in Latin). Vol. VII (1800–1846). Monasterii: Libreria Regensburgiana.
- Remigius Ritzler; Pirminus Sefrin (1978). Hierarchia catholica Medii et recentioris aevi (in Latin). Vol. VIII (1846–1903). Il Messaggero di S. Antonio.
- Pięta, Zenon (2002). Hierarchia catholica medii et recentioris aevi (in Latin). Vol. IX (1903–1922). Padua: Messagero di San Antonio. ISBN 978-88-250-1000-8.

=== Studies ===
- Clouzot, Étienne (1923). Pouillés des provinces d'Aix, d'Arles et d'Embrun. (in French). Paris: Imprimerie nationale, 1923. [pp. lxiv–lxxv; 135-164]
- Duchesne, Louis (1893). La Primatie d'Arles. Memoires de la Societe nationale des Antiquaires de France, LII (in French). Paris: Daupeley-Gouverneur.
- Duchesne, Louis (1907). Fastes épiscopaux de l'ancienne Gaule: Volume I. Provinces du Sud-Est. (in French). second edition. Paris: Fontemoing.
- Fisquet, Honoré (1867). La France pontificale (Gallia christiana): Aix, Arles, Embrun (in French). Vol. 1 (2nd ed.). Paris: E. Repos.
- Fisquet, Honoré (1867). La France pontificale (Gallia christiana): Arles, Embrun (in French). Vol. 2 (2nd ed.). Paris: E. Repos.
- Fournier, Paul (1891). Le royaume d'Arles et de Vienne (1138–1378): Étude sur la formation territoriale de la France dans l'Est et le Sudest. (in French). Paris: A. Picard, 1891.
- Jean, Armand (1891). Les évêques et les archevêques de France depuis 1682 jusqu'à 1801. Paris: A. Picard, 1891.
- Malnory, Arthur (1894). Saint Césaire, évêque d'Arles, 503–543 (in French). Paris: É. Bouillon.

==== External links ====
- Gabriel Chow, G-Catholic, Arles
