= Jean-Pierre Papon =

- Born: 23 January 1734; Puget-Théniers, County of Nice, Kingdom of Sardinia
- Died: 15 January 1803 (aged 68); Paris, France
- Occupations: Historian; Provencialist

Jean-Pierre Papon (23 January 1734 – 15 January 1803) was an 18th-century French abbot, historian of the Provence and of the French Revolution.

== Life and work ==
Papon finished school in Turin and at the age of 18 years became an Oratorian. He then taught as a secondary school teacher in Marseille, Riom, Nantes and Lyon. From 1780, he was a librarian in Marseille and a member of the Académie de Marseille. He fled the French revolution into the Cevennes and on 24 February 1796 became a non resident member of the newly (1795) founded Institut de France (Académie des sciences morales et politique). He was also one of the resident members of the Société des observateurs de l'homme.

He was one of the authors who prepared the scientific Romance and Provencal linguistics of the 19th century.

== Works ==
- 1765: L’art du poète et de l‘orateur. Ouvrage destiné à diriger les études, et à former le goût des jeunes gens et des personnes qui s'adonnent à la littérature. Preceded by an Essai sur l'Éducation, Lyon 1765, 1766, 1768, 1774, 1783; Paris 1800, 1806; Avignon 1811
- 1777–1786: Histoire générale de Provence - 4 vol. Moutard; Read online. In the second volume he incorporated long passages about the troubadours and the history of the Provencal language.
- 1780: Histoire littéraire de Provence - Barois l'aîné Read online
- 1788: Histoire du Gouvernement Français, depuis l'Assemblée des Notables, tenue le 22 février 1787, jusqu'à la fin de Décembre de la même année, London 1788, Paris 1789
- 1800: De la peste ou Epoques mémorables de ce fléau et des moyens de s'en préserver - Lavillette et compagnie - Paris
- 1815: Histoire de la Révolution de France, 6 vol. (posthumous work)

== Sources ==
- Pierre Larousse, Dictionnaire universel du XIXe siècle.
