= Feudal Revolution =

The Feudal Revolution was a major socio-economic and politico-military transformation of Western Europe that supposedly took place in the decades on either side of the year 1000. It is also known as the Transformation of the Year 1000, a term borrowed from the French mutation de l'an mil. The concept of the Feudal Revolution has been hotly debated in medieval studies.

In the standard account of the Feudal Revolution, the public authority of the king and his appointed officers (such as the count), which had characterized the Carolingian Empire, became fragmented in the course of the 10th century. Local lords gradually appropriated public rights, such as levying taxes, enforcing justice, demanding military service and the general right to command (ban). Castles proliferated as bases for these petty lords and the public peace of the Carolingian era was replaced by endemic violence. The result of these changes is what is known as feudalism. The Peace and Truce of God movements are often seen as responses to the Feudal Revolution. The "feudal age" was only came to an end with the emergence of strong monarchies in the 12th and 13th centuries.

The idea of the Feudal Revolution has its genesis in the work of French historian Georges Duby on the region of the Mâconnais between about 980 and 1030, in which period he detected "a breakdown in public law and order". A generation of French scholars following Duby documented evidence for the same processes beyond the Mâconnais and outside France. By the mid-1970s, the process was being described as a revolution. Jean-Pierre Poly and Éric Bournazel provide the first synthesis of this research in 1980 and introduced the term "mutation".

A reaction against the idea of the Feudal Revolution was apparent as early as 1985. Duby himself downplayed the notion in a 1987 book and Dominique Barthélemy rejected it in his 1988 study of the Vendômois. By the 1990s, critiques of the thesis came primarily in two kinds. Barthélemy strengthened his earlier critique by arguing that Carolingian society was as violent and oppressive as anything that came after. On his view, researchers had been misled by, among other things, the word choices of monastic cartularies. Barthélemy sees the fall of the Carolingians after 888 and the rise of urbanisation, bureaucratisation and scholasticism around 1100 as more decisive transformations than anything that took place around 1000. The other kind of critique, represented by Stephen D. White, objects to any periodisation of premodern society based on revolutions or rapid transformations.

== Bibliography ==
- Barthélemy, Dominique (1996). "The 'Feudal Revolution': I". Past & Present (152): 197–205. doi:10.1093/past/152.1.197. JSTOR 651060.
- Barthélemy, Dominique (2005). "La mutation de l'an 1100". Journal des Savants (1): 3–28.
- Barthélemy, Dominique (2009) [1997]. The Serf, the Knight, and the Historian. Translated by Graham Robert Edwards. Cornell University Press.
- Bisson, Thomas N. (1994). "The 'Feudal Revolution'". Past & Present (142): 6–42. JSTOR 651195.
- Bisson, Thomas N. (1997). "The 'Feudal Revolution': Reply". Past & Present (155): 208–225. JSTOR 651131.
- Bois, Guy (1992) [1989]. The Transformation of the Year One Thousand: The Village of Lournand from Antiquity to Feudalism. Translated by Jean Birrell. Manchester University Press.
- Buc, Philippe (2019). "What is Order? In the Aftermath of the 'Feudal Transformation' Debates". Francia. 46: 281–300. doi:10.11588/fr.2019.0.83886.
- Cheyette, Fredric L. (2003). "Some Reflections on Violence, Reconciliation and the 'Feudal Revolution'". In Piotr Gorecki; Warren Brown (eds.). Conflict in Medieval Europe. Ashgate. pp. 243–264.
- Duby, Georges (1953). La société aux XI^{e} et XII^{e} siècles dans la région mâconnaise. Librairie Armand Colin.
- Fiore, Alessio (2020) [2017]. The Seigneurial Transformation: Power Structures and Political Communication in the Countryside of Central and Northern Italy, 1080–1130. Translated by Sergio Knipe. Oxford University Press.
- Fouracre, Paul (2020). "Feudal Revolution? Transformations Around the Year 1000". In Stephen Mossman (ed.). Debating Medieval Europe: The Early Middle Ages, c. 450 – c. 1050. Manchester University Press. pp. 125–149. doi:10.7765/9781526158222.00010.
- Frassetto, Michael (2010). "Feudal Revolution ('transformation of the year 1000')". In Robert E. Bjork (ed.). The Oxford Dictionary of the Middle Ages. Oxford University Press.
- Hollister, C. Warren (1968). "1066: The 'Feudal Revolution'". The American Historical Review. 73 (3): 708–723. JSTOR 1870668.
- Poly, Jean-Pierre; Bournazel, Éric (1991) [1980]. The Feudal Transformation, 900–1200. Translated by Caroline Higgitt. Holmes and Meier Publishers.
- Reuter, Timothy (1997). "The 'Feudal Revolution': III". Past & Present (155): 177–195. JSTOR 651130.
- Tabarrini, Lorenzo (2019–2020). "The 'Feudal Revolution' After All? A Discussion on Four Recent Books". Storicamente. 15–16 (63): 1–29. doi:10.12977/stor809.
- West, Charles (2013). Reframing the Feudal Revolution: Political and Social Transformation Between Marne and Moselle, c. 800–c. 1100. Cambridge University Press.
- White, Stephen D. (1996). "The 'Feudal Revolution': II". Past & Present (152): 205–223. doi:10.1093/past/152.1.205. JSTOR 651060.
- Wickham, Chris (1997). "The 'Feudal Revolution': IV". Past & Present (155): 196–208. doi:10.1093/past/155.1.196. JSTOR 651130.
- Wickham, Chris (2014). "The 'Feudal Revolution' and the Origins of Italian City Communes". Transactions of the Royal Historical Society. 24: 29–55.
