= Abbey of St Caesarius, Arles =

Abbey in Arles, France

- Abbaye Saint-Césaire
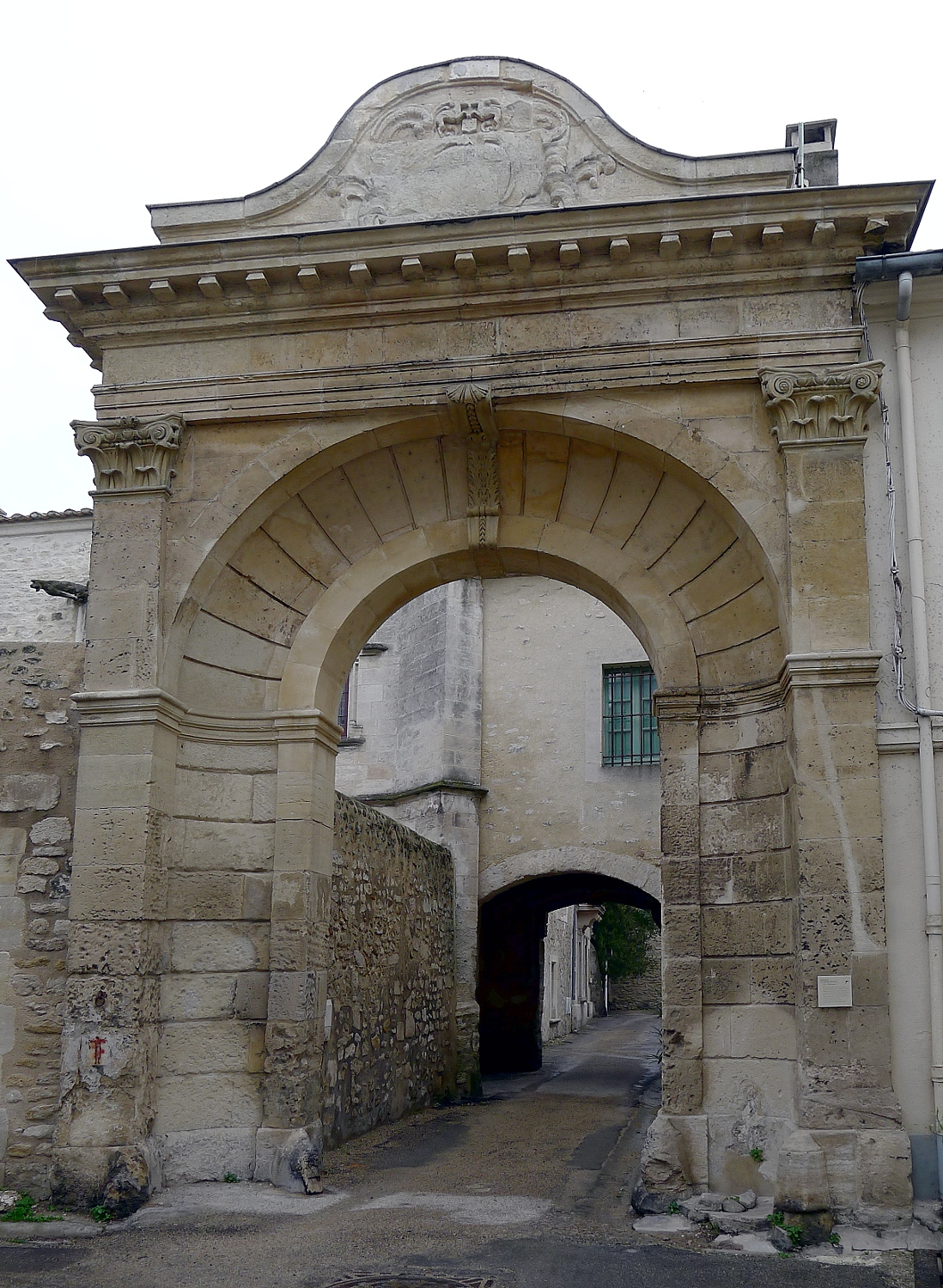
- 18th-century portal of the former Abbey of St Caesarius (classified MH1)

- Location within France
- Interactive map of Abbey of St Caesarius, Arles

Architecture
- Heritage designation: Classé MH 1840/1908/1989; Inscrit MH 1941

Site
- Location: Arles, Bouches-du-Rhône, Provence-Alpes-Côte d'Azur
- Country: France
- Coordinates: 43.67614°N 4.63161°E

The Abbey of St Caesarius (French: Abbaye Saint-Césaire; Occitan: Abadia de Sant Cèsari), at first called the abbey or monastery of St John (French: monastère Saint-Jean; Occitan: monastèr de Sant Joan), was a nunnery in the city of Arles in the south-eastern corner of the rampart. It was founded in 512 AD by Saint Caesarius of Arles, after whom it is now named. The abbey was suppressed in the French Revolution. Those that remained of the buildings were later used as a hospice; they are now abandoned.

== History ==
=== Early Middle Ages ===
The abbey of Saint-Jean was founded on 26 August 512 by the Archbishop of Arles, Caesarius, who appointed his sister Caesaria as first abbess. This foundation followed a first attempt to settle outside the walls in the years 506–507 that was destroyed by Frankish and Burgundian troops during the siege of Arles in 507–508. Around 567 a wife of Guntram, King of Burgundy, probably Marcatrude or Teutéchilde, was locked up in the convent. (Note: Imprisoned queen: According to Christian Settipani and Patrick van Kerrebrouck, this would be Marcatrude, queen of Burgundy by her marriage with the king Gontran. She was locked up with nuns from Arles at the "Monastery of St. John" in 567 after the birth of a stillborn child. She would be the sister of "Giuccio" and "Magnachar" (c. 506–565), Duke of the Francs-Transjurans. However, Gregory of Tours says the queen was Teutéchilde. He wrote in his History of the Franks, King Charibert himself died shortly after her [Paris, between 567 and 570], and after her death Teutéchilde, one of his wives, sent messengers to King Gontran, and offered herself to him in marriage. The king answered, Let her come to me without delay with her treasures, and I will take her to wife and make her great in the eyes of the people, that she may enjoy more honor with me than she has had with my brother who just died. She, happy at this answer, gathered everything she had and came to him. What the king saw, he said: It is more just that these treasures should be in my power than in the power of this which my brother shamefully put into his bed. So taking away much of what she had, and leaving her only a small portion, he sent her to the monastery of Arles. There she submitted only with great sorrow to the fasts and vigils; She therefore addressed herself by secret messengers to a certain Goth, promising him that, if he wanted to take her to Spain and marry her, she would leave the monastery with its treasures and follow him very willingly. He promised it without hesitation: she had therefore gathered her effects and put them in bundles, preparing to leave the convent, but the abbess by her vigilance prevented this project, and having taken her in fraud had her cruelly castigated, then shut up, and she remained thus until her death in not small sufferings.)

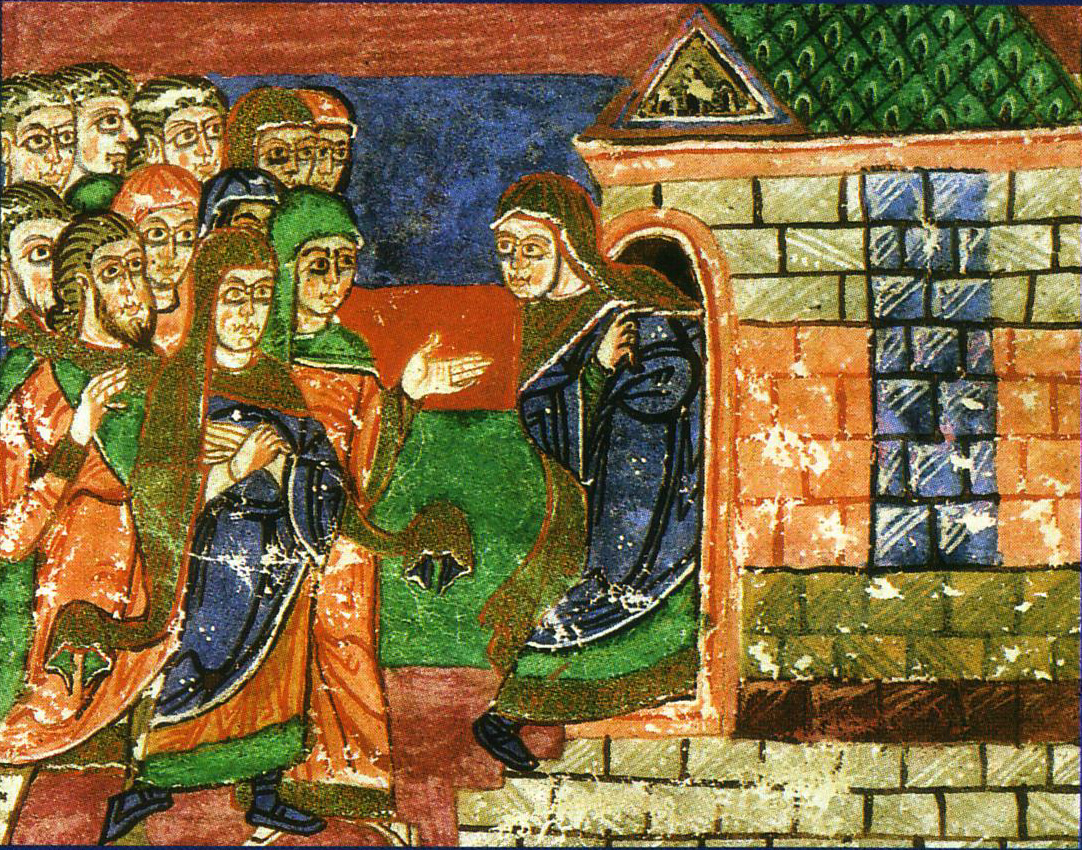
Radegund (c. 520–587) retires, accompanied by the people, to the monastery dedicated to the Virgin that she founded in Poitiers on the model of the Abbey of Saint-Jean d'Arles. Life of Saint Radegonde, eleventh century. Poitiers municipal library

The influence of the monastery and its first abbesses allowed the Rule of St Caesarius to spread widely in the kingdom of the Franks, starting with the monastery created in Poitiers by Radegund, the former wife of King Chlothar I, who stayed in Arles. And in this monastery around 568–569 under the abbacy of Liliole, the third abbess, who died shortly after. (Note: Radegund: Gregory of Tours wrote in his Histoire des Francs, In the sequel, Blessed Radegonde often sought to recover good relations with her bishop, but without being able to achieve it; so that, forced by necessity, she went to the city of Arles with the abbess she had instituted. There, they embraced the rule of Saints Césaire and Césarie, and unable to arrange that their chosen pastor would defend them, they put themselves under the protection of the king. From there arose disputes which grew sour from day to day, until the time when Saint Radegonde passed from this world to the other.) She was accompanied by Agnes, her spiritual sister whom she chose as future abbess and Venantius Fortunatus, an Italian poet who later became her biographer.

The Vie de Rusticule, a text dedicated to the fourth abbess of this nunnery, identifies several churches inside the abbey: a church dedicated to the Holy Cross then to the Archangel Saint Michael and another larger one built to receive the relics of the Holy Cross in better conditions. The presence of these relics in Arles is probably linked to the stay of Queen Radegund. This document also mentions a Basilica of Saint Peter which still existed in the tenth century and specifies the saints who were venerated there. Strangely enough, they are characters of oriental origin with names not widely used in Gaul, such as the archangels Gabriel and Raphael, Saint Thomas, Saint Maurice, Saint Sebastian and Saint Pons. On 12 August 632, the Archbishop Theodosius of Arles took part in the funeral of this abbess considered later as a saint.

The abbey seems to have ceased to exist from the 7th to the 9th century. Towards the end of the 860s, the Archbishop Rotland of Arles wrested authority over it from Emperor Louis II. The historian Jean-Pierre Poly, for his part, specifies and traces this property back to the year 869. In 883, Archbishop Rostang of Arles, the successor of Rotlang, restored the tomb of Saint Caesarius there, which had been violated shortly before during the capture and looting of the city by the Saracens. (Note: Christophe Picard suggests 850 as the date of looting of the Monastery of Saint Césaire by Andalusian and probably Maghrebian sailors.) In 887, in his will, the same Rostang gave a new start to the abbey, which had at that time three groups of estates: one near Arles, in Trébon and Gallignan, and especially in the Camargue including in particular Gimeaux, Malmissane, Notre-Dame-de-la-Mer, Ulmet, Agon, Saint-Césaire de Bozaringue; another in the county of Vaison to the north with Nyons, Vinsobres and Visan; and the last in the county of Saint-Paul-Trois-Châteaux. The abbey then went through a period of subjection to the archbishop and of independence.

=== High Middle Ages ===
Map of the center of the city of Arles (2008); the Abbey of St caesarius was located to the south-east of the city (below, to the right of the map), on the heights which dominate the intersection of boulevards Emile-Combes and Lices

In 972 the abbey regained its autonomy under the leadership of Abbess Ermengarde, appointed by the Archbishop Ithier of Arles. Twenty years later, William I of Provence returned important estates to it. In 1194, Pope Celestine III placed it under his direct authority.

From the sixth to the thirteenth century, the Abbey of Saint-Jean appears as a large landowner endowed initially by Caesaria then by Rostan in their wills, and enriched by purchases as well as numerous donations. For example, in 972 the villa of Niomes is mentioned in a deed of gift from the churches of Saint-Vincent and Saint-Ferréol de Nions to the Abbey of Saint-Césaire. Shortly after 1060 Enaurs, widow of Hugues I of Baux, and her sons returned the Albergues they saw on the villa of Agon in the Camargue. The abbey also had one of the three cemeteries of Alyscamps, as mentioned in an arbitration award of 1121 fixing the respective burial rights with those of Saint-Honorat (i.e., Lérins Abbey).

=== Late Middle Ages ===
In the fourteenth century, the abbey was transformed into a fermier in its Camargue estates (Agon, Granouillet); initially it practiced direct exploitation there, then in the fifteenth century, taking into account the insecurity and the increase in labor costs, the form of sharecropping or renting like the Hospitallers.

A demographic crisis was linked in large part to the epidemics of plague, which caused the loss of more than half of the population of Arles between 1320 and 1430. It severely affected the community of nuns, who mainly originated from the Arles nobility, and whose numbers sank from 108 in 1343 to 22 in 1428.

At that time, the abbey ran up against the archbishop on several occasions and was shaken by internal conflicts linked to the personality of the nuns as well as to monastic discipline, which was slackened significantly. (Note: On 13 July 1441 the council adopted the following text "that those who have no relatives in the convent must not visit it, because this risks compromising the reputation of the convent" and decided to write to Cardinal Louis Aleman, Archbishop of Arles, if the official did not settle the question. For members of the local gentry, the abbey was like a salon where people could meet and talk.) The problem still did not seem to be resolved at the end of the fifteenth century, when a nun decided to leave the monastery to join another community in Aix, because of the looseness of the abbey's mores.

=== Ancien Régime ===
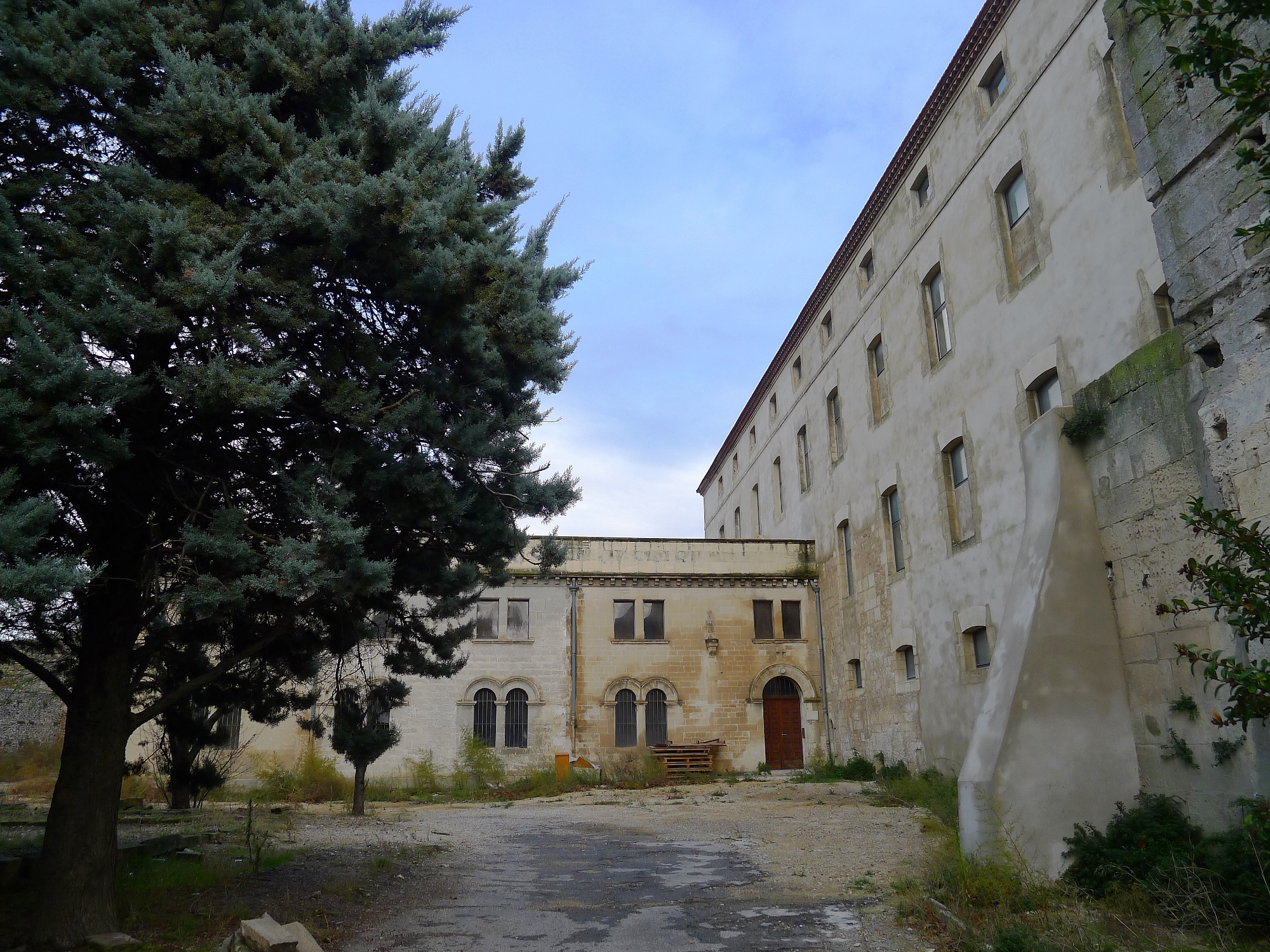
In the background, remains of buildings from the Ancien Régime

In 1559, Abbess Marguerite de Clermont asked the authorities to block the passage between the nunnery and the city wall due to untimely intrusions by young people coming to cause scandals even within the confines of the nunnery itself.

In 1628, Archbishop Mgr du Laurens visited the abbey. His prosecutor considered it necessary to establish a prison in order to put the disobedient nuns back on the right path.

In the mid-1630s the Archbishop of Arles Jean Jaubert de Barrault introduced the Benedictine reform of the Congregation of Saint Maur into the nunnery.

=== After the Revolution ===
Under the French Revolution the abbey was closed and then sold in 1792 as national property. It was then largely destroyed.

In 1877 the Congregation of the Sisters of Notre-Dame des Douleurs moved into what remained of the buildings under the leadership of Berthilde Bertrand from Nancy, who financed the start of the project. The first two sisters, Sister Bernard and Sister Zacharie, left the mother congregation of Tarbes and arrived in Arles on Sunday, 22 October 1877. They established a hospice for the elderly which required major building redevelopments entrusted to the Arles architect Auguste Véran. Inaugurated on 16 October 1898, the site became the Hospice of Saint-Césaire (l'hospice Saint-Césaire.

In 1995, the buildings were permanently abandoned.

== Gallery ==
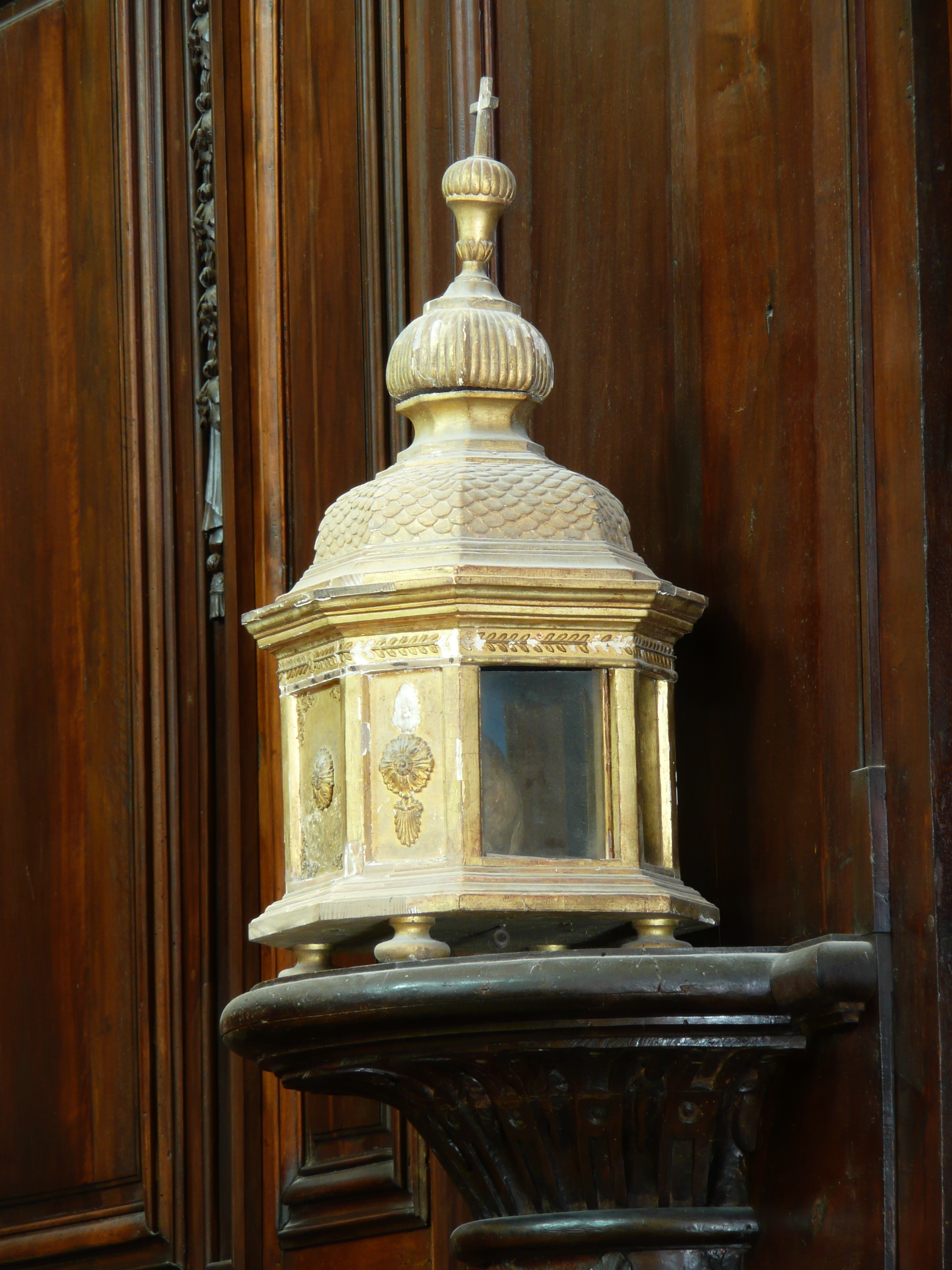
Reliquary of Saint Rusticule exhibited at the Church of the Major in Arles

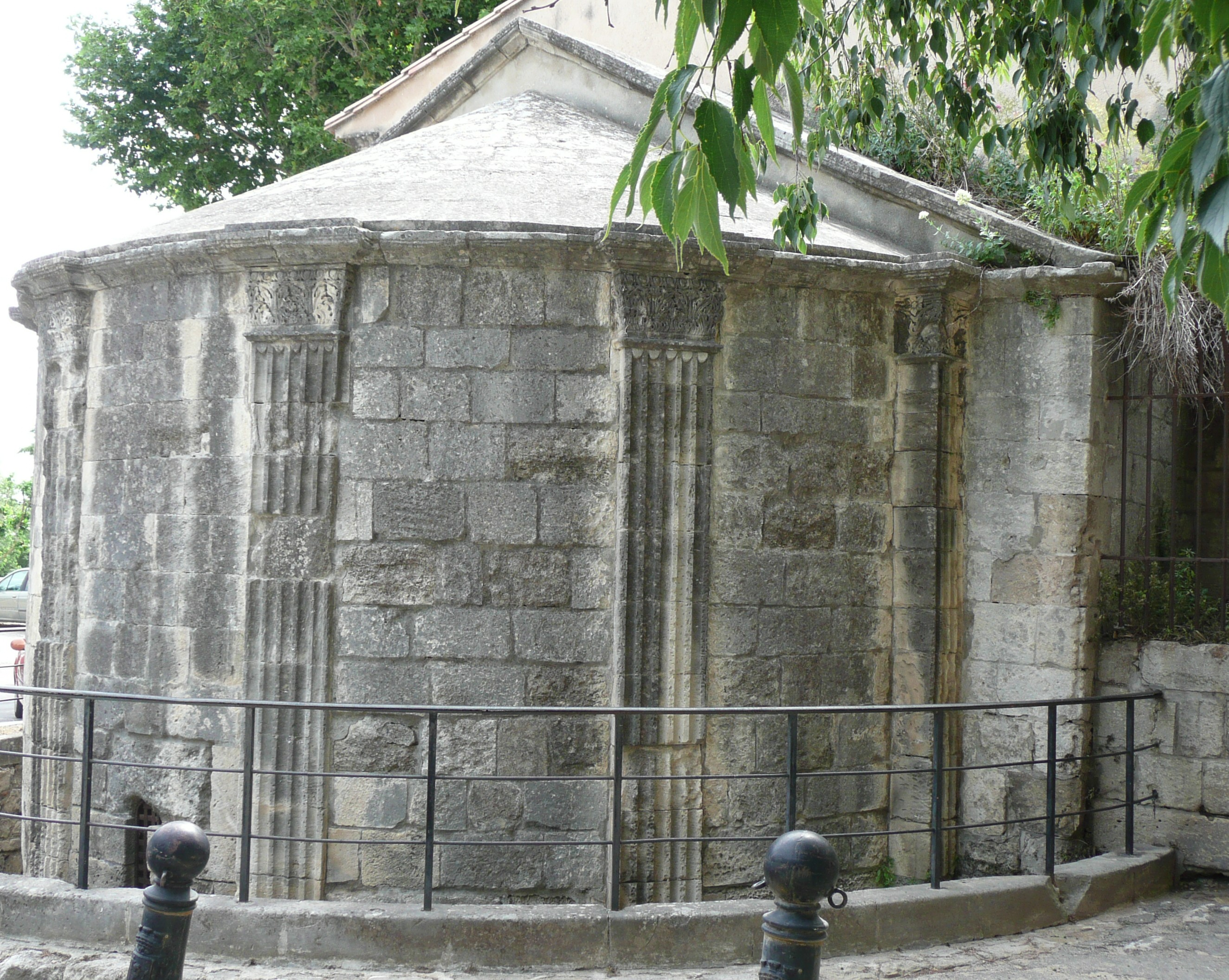
Chapelle Saint-Jean-du-Moustiers

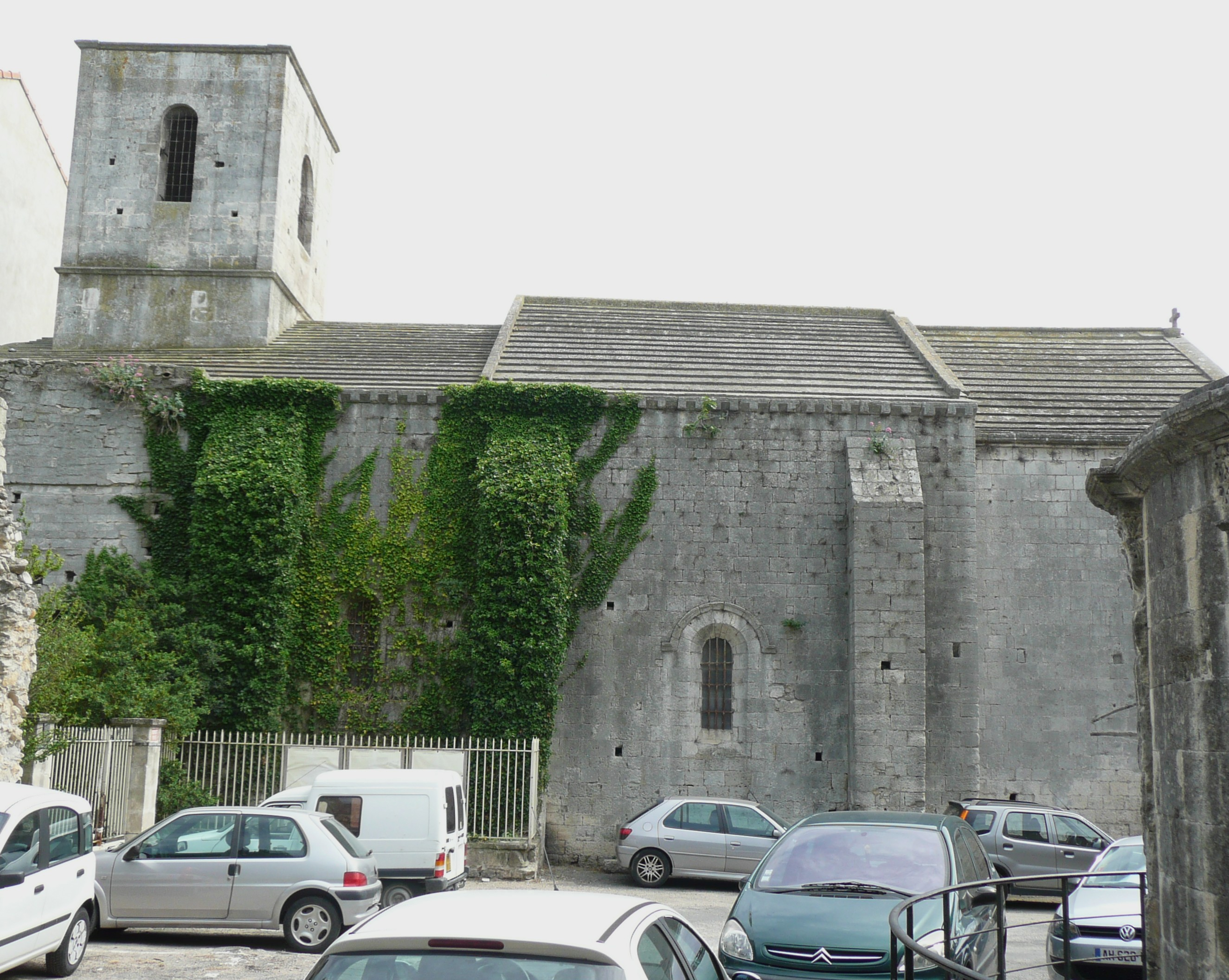
Église Saint-Blaise, north face

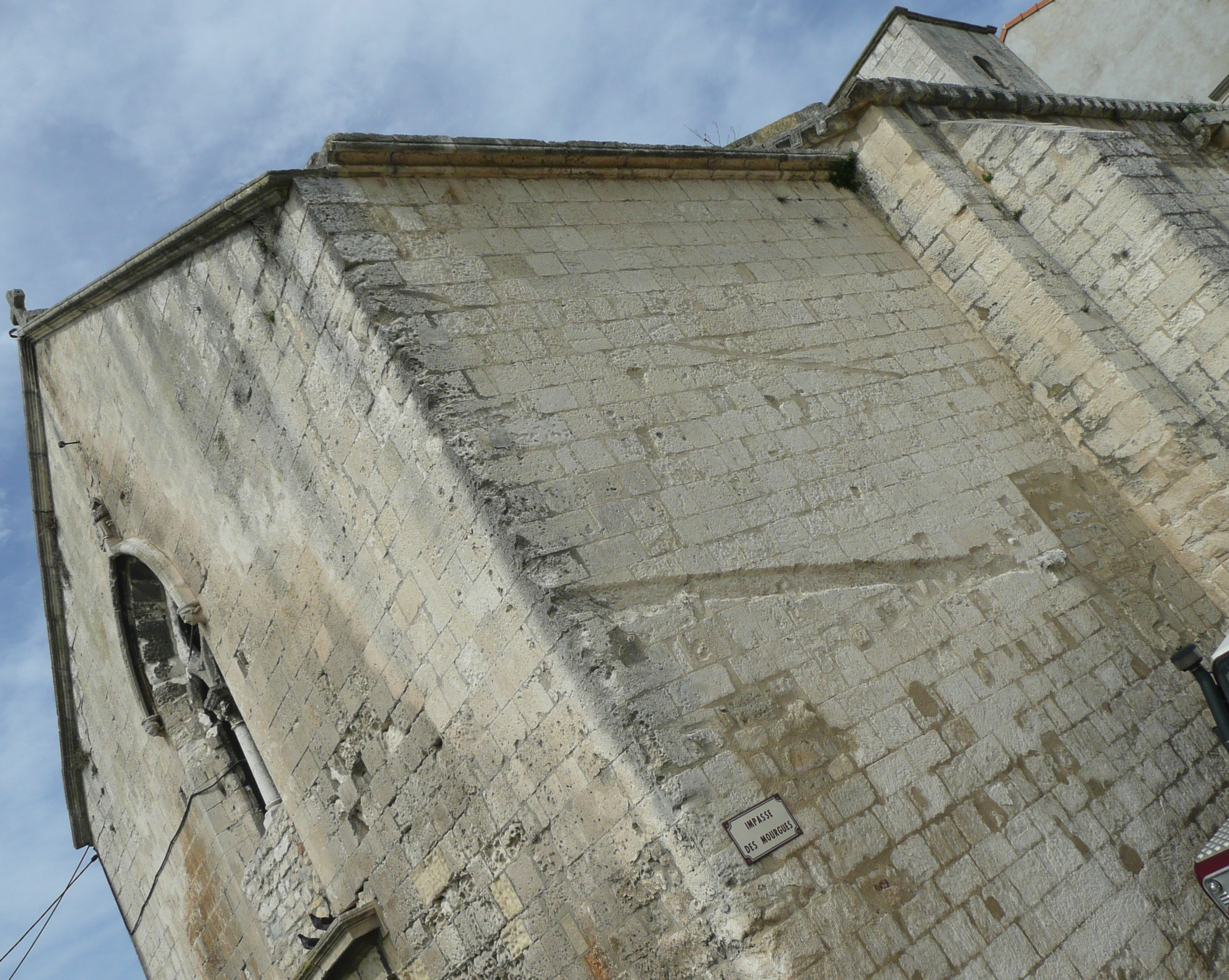
Église Saint-Blaise, west window mullion detail

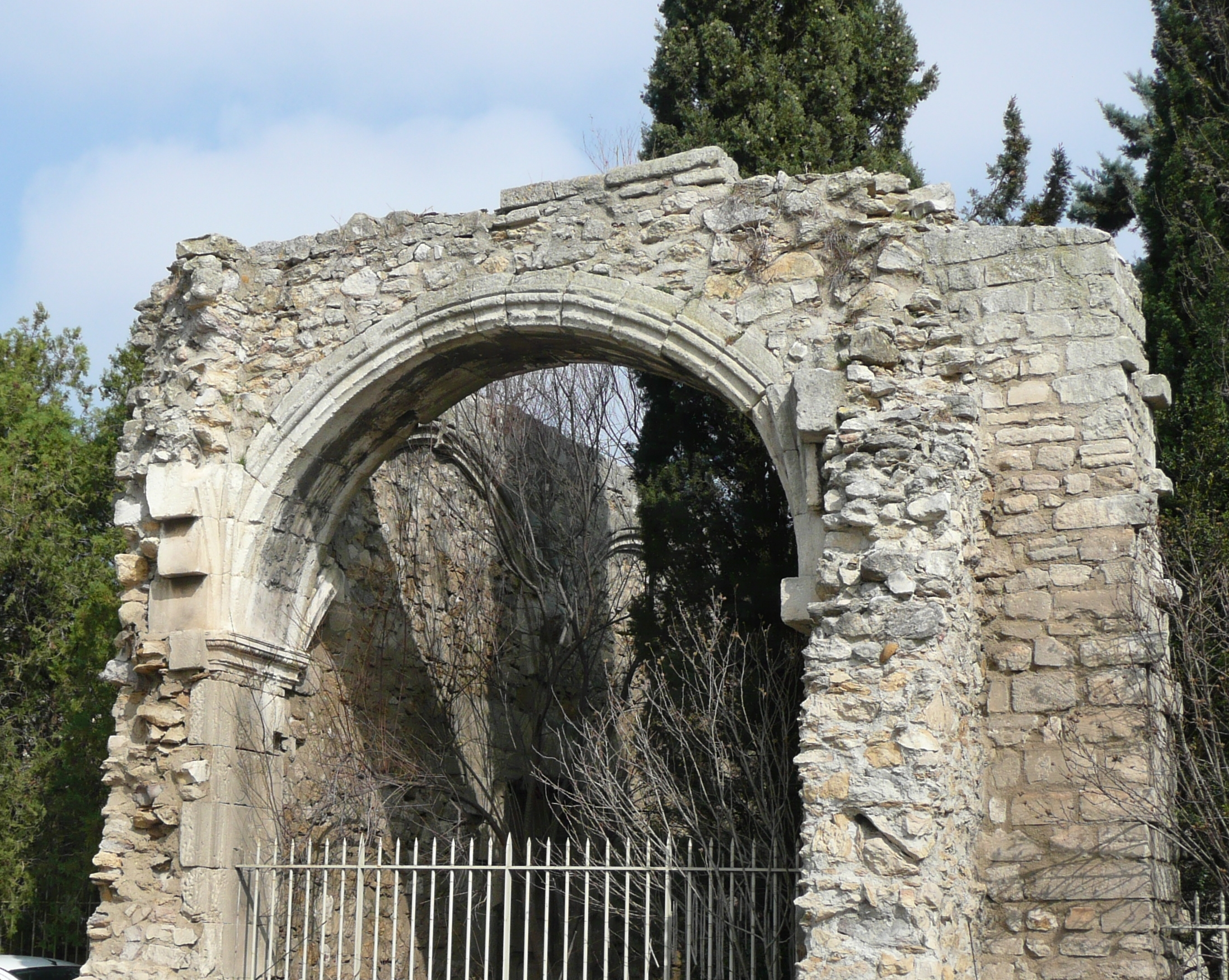
Saint-Césaire Convent, vestiges of vaulted room

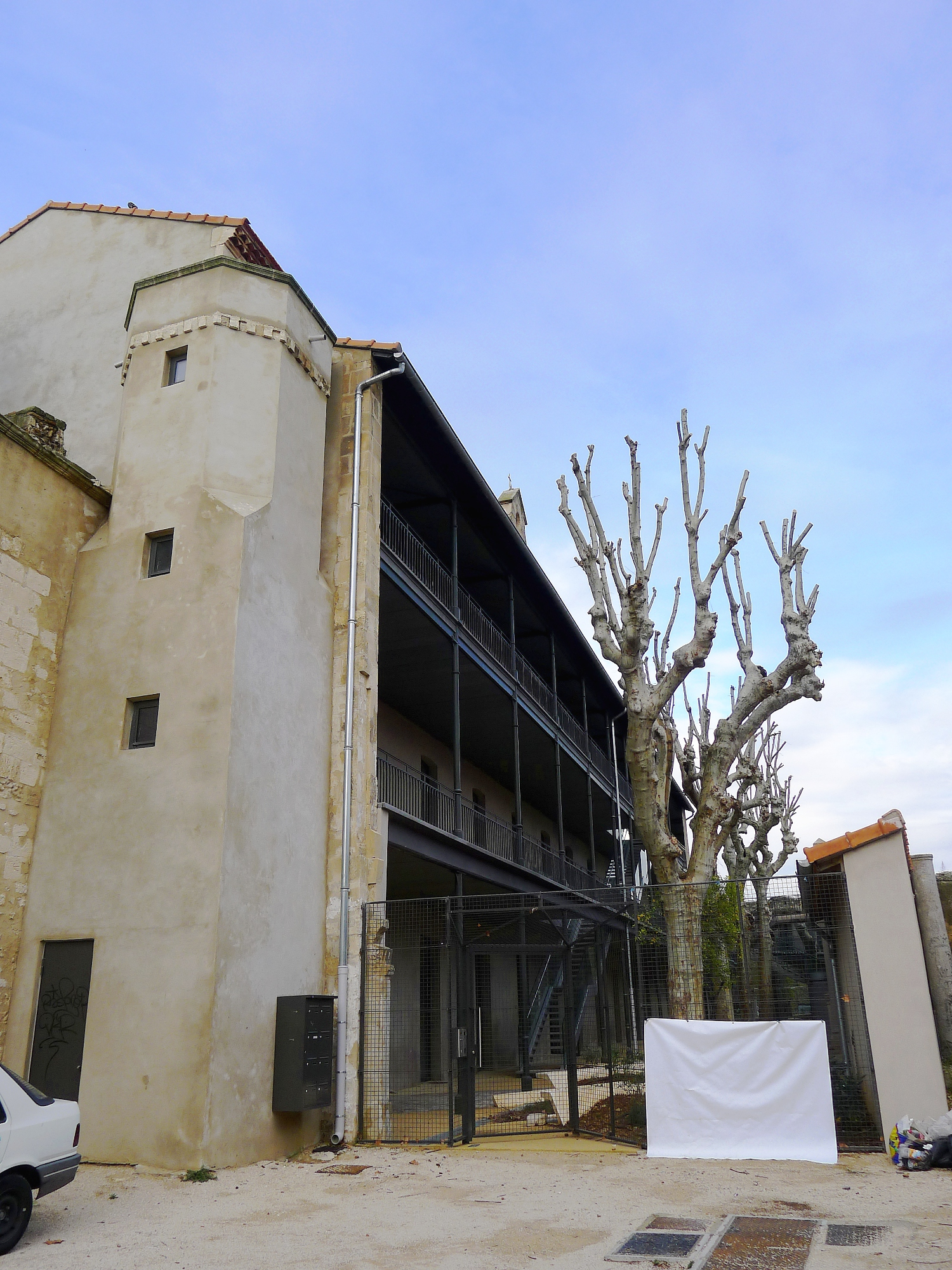
Hospice building transformed into a residence

== Abbesses ==
- 512–527: Caesaria, sister of Bishop Caesarius of Arles
- 527–559: Caesaria II
- 562–569: Liliola (Note: Liliole: We find a first mention of her as abbess of the monastery of Saint–Césaire in 562/563, in a letter she addressed to King Gontran.) Local saint, feast on 6 August
- 569–632: Rusticula or Marcia (551–632)
- 632–?: Celsa
- 6??–6??: Sainte Eulalie.
- 6??–7??: Sainte Léocadie.
- 7??–7??: Sainte Suzanne.
- 7??–8??: Sainte Julienne.
- 8??–8??: Sainte Eugènie.
- 8??–9??: Sainte Victoire.
- 9??–9??: Sainte Euphémie.
- 9??–970: Sainte Préminole.
- 972– : Ermengarde, named abbess by Archbishop Ithier of Arles
- 992–993: Eloïse.
- 993–997: Gillette I.
- 997–10??: Adèle.
- 10??–1026: Gillette II.
- 1026–1059: Galburge.
- 1059–11??: Anceline I.
- 11??–1170: Anceline II.
- 1170 c.: Jourdane. (Note: Jourdane c. 1170 gave in fief the territory on which the Benedictines founded Ulmet abbey)
- 1176–1196 c.: Aldiarde. (Note: Aldiarde was abbess in 1192, and was still abbess in April 1196.)
- 1208 c. : Audiarde
- 1221 c. : Audiarda (Note: It is probable that Aldiarde, Audiarde and Audiarda are one person, abbess of Saint–Césaire from 1174 to 1221, or about 50 years.)
- 1233 c. : Florence (Note: Florence c. 1233. Raymond Bérenger V gave Florence, abbess of Saint–Césaire, his rights to the fief, adjoining an estate owned by Bertan Porcelet, owned by his monastery in Albaron.)
- 1259 c. : Ermessinde (Note: F. de Marin de Carranrais wrote in L'Abbaye de Montmajour : étude historique, "Guillaume de Ronnis ... administered the affairs of the monastery [Montmajour abbey] for about a year without having received confirmation of his title. He ceded to Ermessînde, abbess of Saint-Césaire d'Arles, all the rights that Montmajour had over Vile de Cordes, located a short distance to the south-east of the abbey, and received from her in exchange his domain of Castellet, which was also very close.)
- 1270 c. : Hermessinde (Note: Hermessinde c. 1270: The monks of Ulmet Abbey in Camargue recognised thar they owed her an annual rent.)
- 1273 c. : Audiarda (Note: Audiarda is mentioned in an act dated 21 November 1271 that was passed in Arles in the palace of the archbishopric.) (Note: Eldéarde, daughter of Giraud V Adhémar de Monteil, baron of Grignan, widow in 1266 of Bertrand des Baux, son of Raymond seigneur of Meyrargues and Alasacie, vicomtesse of Marseille, retired to the Saint Césaire Convent where she soon became the abbess-)
- 1296–1314 : Alasacia de Lambisco or Azalaïs de Lambesc (Note: Alasacia de Lambisco is named in an act dated 1 January 1296 that was passed in Arles in the palace of the archbishop.)
- 1314–1317 : Rixendis de Sancto–Cannato
- 1317–1319 : Rixendis de landa
- 1319–1326 : Margarita de Benevento
- 1326–1329 : Elixendis de Vicinis
- 1329–1345 : Suriana de Arenis, d'une famille de Beaucaire
- 1345–1350 : Dionisa de Ripe Digna
- 1351–1366 : Guillelma de Remolonis
- 1366–1385 : Jauseranda de Cadella
- 1385–1391 : Maria de Crosio, of a family from Limousin; relative of Pierre de Cros, Archbishop of Arles.
- 1391–1416 : Galiena de Pugeto, de Puget–Théniers; sister of Manuel de Puget, Viguier d'Arles killed by the Tuschins during the capture of Arles in July.
- 1416–1433 : Dulcia Gantelme, daughter of Johan Gantelme, founder of the monastery of Notre–Dame et Saint–Honorat in Tarascon.
- 1433–1468 : Esmengarda Stephani. (Note: Esmengarda Stephani: Daughter of Raymundus Stephani, seigneur of Lambesc and Venelles. In 1454 she was cited in an exchange of rights with the archbishop of Arles and abbot of Montmajour, Pierre de Foix, le vieux.)
- 1468–1501 : Catherina de Sancto Michaele
- 1501–1521 : Jeanne Adhémar de La Garde
- 1521–1540 : Madeleine de Grille de Robiac
- 1540–1549 : Jeanne de Grille de Robiac
- 1549–1549 : Jehanne Reynaude d'Alen (Note: Jehanne Reynaude d'Alen; Elected in January 1549 she was deposed by Henri II who considered that her election was contrary to the concordat agreed between King Francis I and Pope Leo X.)
- 1549–1569 : Marguerite de Clermont
- 1569–1591 : Madeleine de Grille de Robiac
- 1591–1622 : Anne d’Autric
- 1622–1625 : Jeanne de Vincens de Mauléon de Causans
- 1625–1631 : Marie de Vincens de Mauléon de Causans
- 1631–1671 : Catherine de Grille de Robiac
- 1671–1705 : Marguerite de Poilloüe de Saint–Mars
- 1705–1706 : Claudine Charpin des Halles du Vernet
- 1706–1708 : Angélique Roses
- 1709–1754 : Marguerite Amat de Gravaison
- 1754–1775 : Françoise de Viguier (1716 – 11 January 1775); abbess from 10 December 1754
- 1775–1792 : Marguerite de Moreton de Chabrillan

== Sources ==
- "1877, les débuts de l'asile des vieillards ou enclos Saint-Césaire", AVA (in French) (173)
- Albanés, Joseph Hyacinthe (1895), Gallia christiana novissima: Histoire des archevêchés, évêques et abbayes de France (in French), vol. 178
- Amargier, Paul (1972), Cartulaire de Trinquetaille (in French), Aix-en-Provence: Université de Provence
- Aurell, Martin (2001), Actes de la famille Porcelet (972-1320), doc. inédits sur l'histoire de France (in French), Paris: CTHS
- Base Mérimée, Ancienne abbaye Saint-Césaire (in French), Ministère français de la Culture
- Baudat, Michel; Creissen, Claire-Lise (2013), Les saints d'Arles, Rencontre avec le Patrimoine religieux, ISBN 978-2-911948-38-1
- Congrès archéologique de France, 134e session (in French), Pays d'Arles
- F. de Marin de Carranrais (1877), L'Abbaye de Montmajour : étude historique d'après les manuscrits de D. Chantelou et autres documents inédits (in French), Marseille
- Fassin, Émile (1891), Bulletin archéologique d'Arles (in French)
- Gregory of Tours IV, Histoire des Francs (in French), vol. IV
- Gregory of Tours IX, Histoire des Francs (in French)
- Nadal, Abbé (1858), Essai historique sur les Adhémar et madame de Sévigné (in French), Valence
- Picard, Christophe (2015), La mer des Califes (in French), p. 138
- Poly, Jean-Pierre (1976), La Provence et la société féodale 879-1166 (in French), Paris: éditions Bordas, ISBN 978-2-04-007740-2
- Poupardin, René (1901), Le Royaume de Provence sous les Carolingiens (855-933?) (in French), Librairie Émile Bouillon
- Rouquette, Jean-Maurice (Conservateur en Chef Honoraire du Patrimoine) (16 October 2008), Saint-Jean d'Arles, la fondation et les débuts du monastère (in French)
- Rouquette, Jean-Maurice (2008b), Arles, histoire, territoires et cultures (in French), Paris: Éditions Imprimerie nationale, ISBN 978-2-7427-5176-1
- Settipani, Christian; Kerrebrouck, Patrick van (1993), La Préhistoire des Capétiens, 481-987, Première partie : Merovingians, Carolingians et Robertiens, Éditions Christian (in French), Villeneuve d'Ascq
- Stouff, Louis (2001), L'Église et la vie religieuse à Arles et en Provence au Moyen Âge (in French), Aix- en-Provence: Publications de l'Université de Provence, pp. 69–78
