= Neokaisareia =

Neokaisareia (Greek: Νεοκαισάρεια, "New Caesarea"), can refer to:

- the historical city of Neokaisareia in the Pontus, now Niksar in Turkey
- the village of Neokaisareia, Pieria in northern Greece, founded by Pontic refugees
