= Caesaria =

Caesaria may refer to:

- Caesaria the Elder, abbess of Arles (512–c.525)
- Caesaria the Younger, abbess of Arles (c.525–c.560), niece of the prec.
- Caesaria (turtle), a prehistoric genus of turtles

== See also ==
- Caesarea (disambiguation)
- Caesarian
