= Rusticula =

Abbess of Saint-Jean d'Arles

Start of Rusticula's Life in a 14th-century manuscript

Rusticula (c. 556 – 11 August 632), also called Marcia, was the abbess of Saint-Jean d'Arles from 575 until her death.

Heiress of a wealthy family, she was abducted as a child before being brought to the abbey. In 613, she was arrested and accused of being part of a plot against King Chlothar II but was ultimately freed. She was treated as a saint upon her death. Her biography was written within a generation of her death.

== Hagiography ==
Rusticula's life is known primarily though a Latin biography, The Life of Rusticula, or Marcia, Abbess of Arles, written by a certain Florentius, a priest of Saint-Paul-Trois-Châteaux, and dedicated to Celsa, Rusticula's successor. Florentius may have been raised in the convent and been present at Rusticula's death or funeral. The Latin title of the biography is Vita Rusticulae sive Marciae abbatissae Arelatensis.

The earliest complete copy of the Life is found in a 14th-century manuscript, now in Paris, Bibliothèque nationale de France, lat. 3820. In his edition for the Monumenta Germaniae Historica, Bruno Krusch condemned the Life as a forgery from the reign of Louis the Pious (814–840), based on the quality of the text's Latinity and its uncertain chronology. This view is not widely accepted today.

The Life is certainly a saint's life. It claims that Rusticula memorized the entire Bible and wore a hairshirt. It recounts several miracles performed by her during her arrest and on her return journey to Arles.

== Early life ==
Rusticula was born around 556 near Vaison into a wealthy Gallo-Roman family. According to the Life, Rusticula was a family name, while "the entire household" called her Marcia. It is not clear if the household in question was her parents' or the convent, in which case Marcia may have been a religious name adopted when she became a nun. Her parents were Valerianus and Clementia and, according to the Life, her father died on the day of her birth. The Life presents her as the sole heiress of her family, but there is reason to believe that Abbo of Provence, who lived a century later, was a member of the same family.

At a young age, Rusticula was abducted by Cheraonius, who wished to marry her for her inheritance. The intervention of Liliola, the abbess of Saint-Jean, and Bishop Syagrius of Autun with King Guntram secured her release and she was allowed to enter the abbey of Saint-Jean. Although Rusticula's mother petitioned Bishop Sapaudus of Arles for the return of her daughter, Guntram refused because the girl had already professed as a nun. She would have been at least six or seven years old at the time, according to the Regula virginum in force at Arles.

== Abbess ==
Rusticula was elected to succeed Liliola in 575. She appears to have had a relic of the True Cross that she carried on her person. The Life credits her with major building projects in which "she brought stones to the workmen with her own hands."

Sometime after 613, when Provence had fallen to Chlothar II, Rusticula was accused of participating in a plot against the king's life. She may have been perceived as too close to Guntram and his successors.

A prayer to Rusticula incorporated into a copy of the Life in a 17th-century manuscript

According to the Life, Rusticula was first accused by a certain bishop Maximus and the patrician of Provence, Ricomer. There was even an attempt on her life by a certain Audoaldus before Chlothar ordered her arrest. The man he sent, Faraulf, having failed to persuade her to surrender, threatened the local governor Nymfidius with retaliation if he did not engineer her surrender, which he did. For her arrest, Bishop Domnolus of Vienne denounced Chlothar II, probably at the Council of Paris in 614. She prevailed at the king's court and was permitted to return to Arles.

== Death and veneration ==
According to the Life, Rusticula was 77 years old when she died. Her death is usually placed in 632, although the year is not given in the Life. She died after a short illness on 11 August. Florentius reports one posthumous miracle worked through her intercession to prove her sainthood: a lame man was healed after drinking the water that washed the pallet that had carried her body.

Rusticula's feast day is 11 August in the Roman Martyrology, but her feast is not in the General Roman Calendar. It is mentioned in several missals and breviaries from Provence from the 13th and 14th centuries. One breviary from Arles from the early 14th century contains a brief extract from the Life.

== Bibliography ==
- Geary, Patrick J. (1985). Aristocracy in Provence: The Rhône Basin at the Dawn of the Carolingian Age. University of Pennsylvania Press.7
- McNamara, Jo Ann; Halborg, John E.; Whatley, E. Gordon, eds. (1992). Sainted Women of the Dark Ages. Duke University Press.
- Riché, Pierre (1954). "Note d'hagiographie mérovingienne: La Vita S. Rusticulae". Analecta Bollandiana. 72: 369–377. doi:10.1484/J.ABOL.4.01907.
- Watkins, Basil (2016). The Book of Saints: A Comprehensive Biographical Dictionary (8th rev. ed.). Bloomsbury.
