= Tachlifa of the West =

Historical West African political territory.

Tachlifa of the West (Hebrew: תחליפא בר מערבא, romanized: Tachlifa bar Ma'arava, lit. 'Tachlifa son of the West') was an amora in Syria Palæstina region, who also traveled to Babylonia. He was a student of Rabbi Abbahu, and also taught in the study hall of Rabbi Abbahu in Caesaria. In Baba Metzia Rav Tachlifa teaches that if two people are grabbing a tallis, they each take what is in their grasp, and they divide the rest equally. Rabbi Abbahu indicates to Rav Tachlifa that he should also note that they take an oath. In Berachot 55a, Tachlifa shares a teaching about dreams of Rabbi Yohanan Ben Zakkai of Tiberias in the study hall of Abbahu in Caesaria. Whereas Rav Tahlifa noted a verse from Daniel 2:21 as a prooftext, Rabbi Abbahu points out to him that we in Caesaria derive that idea about how dreams are interpreted from a verse in Exodus 31:6. In Sotah 27a Rav Tachlifa teaches in the study hall of Abbahu that if a woman is suspected of adultery, the children are not considered bastards.
