= Caesarea =

Caesarea, a city name derived from the Roman title "Caesar", was the name of numerous cities and locations in the Roman Empire:

== Places ==
=== In the Levant ===
- Caesarea Maritima, also known as "Caesarea Palaestinae", an ancient Roman city near the modern Israeli town
  - Caesarea in Palaestina (diocese)
- Caesarea (modern town), official name Qeysarya, a modern town in Israel built near the site of ancient Caesarea Maritima
- Barrat Qisarya, a tribal village near in Mandatory Palestine until depopulation in 1948
- Caesarea ad Libanum, a Roman name of Arqa in Lebanon
- Caesarea Philippi, an ancient city at Banias in the Golan Heights
- Caesarea Magna, formerly Larissa in Syria, now Shaizar, an ancient Roman city and modern Syrian town

=== In Turkey ===
- Caesarea in Cappadocia, modern Kayseri, an ancient Roman and modern Anatolian city
- Caesarea in Bithynia, alias Germanicopolis (Bithynia), former bishopric and present Latin Catholic titular see
- Caesarea in Cilicia, renamed Anazarbus, an ancient Cilician and Roman city in Turkey
- Caesarea in Paphlagonia, renamed Hadrianopolis in Paphlagonia, in Turkey
- Caesarea Antiochia, also known as Antioch of Pisidia, an ancient Pisidian and Roman city
- Caesarea Germanica, now Kahramanmaraş in southern Turkey, an ancient Roman and Byzantine town
- Caesarea Cibyra, in southwest Anatolia, also called Cibyra

=== Elsewhere ===
- Kaisareia, Kozani in Macedonia, Greece
- Caesarea in Mauretania, an ancient Roman-Berber city and former capital of Mauretania Caesariensis now in Cherchell, Algeria
- Caesarea, a former name of the island of Jersey in the Channel Islands
- Nova Caesarea, the Latin name applied to the colony of New Jersey, now a US state, derived from the name of the island

== Other uses ==
- The Kidon, a unit in the Mossad formerly known as the Caesarea
- Caesarea, the third novel in The Pontypool Trilogy by Tony Burgess
- Caesarea (plant), a plant genus in the family Francoaceae

== See also ==
- Caesaria
- Caesariana
- Claudiocaesarea or Mistea, an ancient Roman city near Beyşehir in Turkey
