= William E. Klingshirn =

American classicist (born 1955)

- Born: 1955 (age 70–71); North Olmsted, Ohio, U.S.

Academic background
- Education: College of the Holy Cross (BA); Stanford University (MA, PhD)
- Thesis: Authority, Consensus and Dissent: Caesarius of Arles and the Making of a Christian Community in Late Antique Gaul (1985)

Academic work
- Discipline: Classics
- Institutions: Catholic University of America

William Eugene Klingshirn (born 1955) is an American classicist and authority on Caesarius of Arles. He is the Margaret H. Gardiner Professor Emeritus of Greek and Latin at the Catholic University of America.

== Early life and education ==
Klingshern was born and raised in North Olmsted, Ohio. He graduated from the College of the Holy Cross with a Bachelor of Arts in classics, with highest honors, in 1977. He then earned a Master of Arts in classics in 1982 and his Ph.D. in classics in 1985 from Stanford University. His doctoral dissertation was titled, Authority, Consensus and Dissent: Caesarius of Arles and the Making of a Christian Community in Late Antique Gaul.

== Academic career ==
After receiving his doctorate, Klingshern became a professor at the Catholic University of America (CUA) in 1985. He primarily taught the history and culture of the late antique Mediterranean world. He also taught courses in classics, ancient history, Latin, Ancient Greek, early Christianity, and late antiquity. In 2013–2014, he was the chairman of the Department of Greek and Latin.

Much of Klingshirn's scholarship has concerned Christianity and society in late antiquity, particularly the history of Caesarius of Arles. In 1994, he published Caesarius of Arles: The Making of a Christian Community in Late Antique Gaul, a study of Christianization in sixth-century southern Gaul centered on Caesarius's efforts to promote Christian beliefs and practices. The same year he published Caesarius of Arles: Life, Testament, Letters, which provided translations, notes, and an introduction to a collection of writings by and about Caesarius. His later research has included divination in late antiquity, lived religion in the early Middle Ages, and Latin literature concerning medicine, divination, and magic in the sixth and seventh centuries.

Klingshirn received fellowships from the National Endowment for the Humanities (NEH) in 1988–1989 and 2006–2007. In 2000, while an associate professor at Catholic University, he received an American Council of Learned Societies fellowship for a project titled Diviners and the Power of Knowledge in Late Antiquity.

Klingshirn became an associate director of Catholic University's Center for the Study of Early Christianity when the center was established in 2001. He then served as president of the Classical Association of the Atlantic States (CAAS) during the 2001–2002 academic year. In 2015, he succeeded Philip Rousseau as director of the Center for the Study of Early Christianity. In 2017, CUA named Klingshern as its Margaret H. Gardiner Professor of Greek and Latin.

Klingshern has served on the editorial committee of the Translated Texts for Historians series and was a member of the board of editors of the journal Traditio from 2007 to 2013. He also joined the editorial board, known as the Doctorum Collegium, of the new series of Latinitas, the journal of the Pontifical Academy for Latin. In 2014, he was appointed a fellow (sodalis) of the Pontifical Academy for Latin. He is also a corresponding member of the Académie d'Arles in France. In 2015, CAAS honored him with an ovatio for his scholarship and service to the association.

As of 2025–2026, Klingshern is the Margaret H. Gardiner Professor Emeritus of Greek and Latin at CUA.

== Selected publications ==
=== Books ===
- Klingshirn, William E. (1994). Caesarius of Arles: The Making of a Christian Community in Late Antique Gaul. Cambridge Studies in Medieval Life and Thought, Fourth Series. Vol. 22. Cambridge: Cambridge University Press. doi:10.1017/CBO9780511583872. ISBN 978-0-521-43095-1.
- Caesarius of Arles: Life, Testament, Letters. Translated Texts for Historians. Vol. 19. Translated by Klingshirn, William E. Liverpool: Liverpool University Press. 1994. ISBN 978-0-85323-368-8.
- Klingshirn, William E.; Vessey, Mark, eds. (1999). The Limits of Ancient Christianity: Essays on Late Antique Thought and Culture in Honor of R. A. Markus. Recentiores: Later Latin Texts and Contexts. Ann Arbor: University of Michigan Press. doi:10.3998/mpub.16249. ISBN 978-0-472-10997-5.
- Klingshirn, William E.; Safran, Linda, eds. (2007). The Early Christian Book. CUA Studies in Early Christianity. Washington, D.C.: Catholic University of America Press. doi:10.2307/j.ctt2853v4. ISBN 978-0-8132-1486-3.
- Luijendijk, AnneMarie; Klingshirn, William E., eds. (2018). My Lots are in Thy Hands: Sortilege and its Practitioners in Late Antiquity. Religions in the Graeco-Roman World. Vol. 188. Leiden: Brill. doi:10.1163/9789004385030. ISBN 978-90-04-38410-1.
