= Christian Settipani =

French genealogist and historian (born 1961)

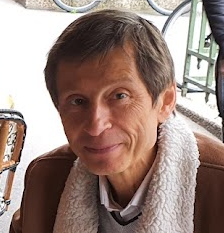
- Christian Settipani in 2020
- Born: 31 January 1961 (age 65)
- Occupations: IT technical director, genealogist, historian, author

Christian Settipani (born 31 January 1961) is a French genealogist, historian and IT professional, currently working as the Technical Director of a company in Paris.

== Biography ==
Settipani holds a Master of Advanced Studies from the Paris-Sorbonne University (1997), received a doctorate in history in December 2013 from the University of Lorraine with a dissertation titled Les prétentions généalogiques à Athènes sous l'empire romain ("Genealogical claims in Athens under the Roman Empire") and obtained in June 2019 from the Sorbonne university an habilitation (highest qualification level issued through university process) for a dissertation titled "Liens dynastiques entre Byzance et l'étranger à l'époque des Comnène et des Paléologue" (dynastic links between Byzantium and foreign countries under the Komnenos and Paleologos"). He collaborates with the U.M.R 8167 "Orient et Mediterranée - le monde byzantin" laboratory from the French Centre National de la Recherche Scientifique (CNRS).

Settipani is best known for his work on the genealogy and prosopography of elites in Europe and the Near East. He has given particular attention to the possibility of genealogical continuity between families of late antiquity and families of the early mediaeval period, as revealed by shared naming patterns amongst them (see Descent from antiquity). Settipani is co-founder and general editor with Katharine S. B. Keats-Rohan of the publication series of the Unit for Prosopographical Research at Linacre College of Oxford University.

Settipani's work is an important example of the trend in early mediaeval historical studies away from the idea, dominant for centuries, that elites of the late Roman Empire were entirely displaced in the West by unrelated Germanic invaders and "new men" or, alternatively, that to the extent they may not have been displaced memories of their origins and ties have become irretrievably obscured. This revision has contributed to better understanding of familial relations, society, and politics in that era, through a broad presentation of the subject matter, extensive citation of prior research and alternative viewpoints, and solutions to genealogical and prosopographical questions; Settipani has published his own work and has been extensively cited in scholarly papers and books on early mediaeval western European history. However, a few scholars have expressed concern that Settipani's presentation lacks accessibility, and that the very breadth and volume of the material which he treats in a single work tend to make it more difficult to evaluate his conclusions and their implications for specific historical contexts.

== Publications ==
=== Books ===
The earlier works were originally published by Éditions Francis Christian in French. Later works have been released via other publishers.

- Les ancêtres de Charlemagne, 1989
- Nos ancêtres de l'Antiquité, 1991
- La préhistoire des Capétiens, 1993
- Les Widonides: le destin d'une famille aristocratique franque du VIe au Xe siècle, 1998.
- Continuité gentilice et continuité sénatoriale dans les familles sénatoriales romaines à l'époque impériale, 2000
- Onomastique et Parenté dans l'Occident médiéval, 2000, Settipani and K.S.B. Keats-Rohan, editors
- La noblesse du Midi Carolingien, 2004
- Continuité des élites à Byzance durant les siècles obscurs. Les princes caucasiens et l'Empire du VIe au IXe siècle, 2006
- Les prétentions généalogiques à Athènes sous l'Empire romain, 2013
- Les ancêtres de Charlemagne. 2nd edition, 2014

=== Articles ===
- ‘Les Polignac : quelques orientations pour la recherche historique et généalogique’, Studies in Genealogy and Family History in Tribute to Charles Evans on the Occasion of His Eightieth Birday, éd. Lindsay Brook, Londres 1989, pp. 327–353 & pl. XVII.
- ‘Ruricius Ier, évêque de Limoges et ses alliances familiales’, Francia, 18, 1 (1991), pp. 195–222.
- ‘La transition entre Mythe et Réalité’, Archives and Genealogical Sciences / Les Archives et les Sciences Généalogiques, éd. André Vanrie, Archivum, 37 (1992), pp. 27–67.
- ‘Les origines maternelles du comte de Bourgogne Otte-Guillaume’, Annales de Bourgogne, 66 (1994), p. 5-63. 5. ‘Clovis. Un roi sans ancêtres ?’, Gé-Magazine, n° 153, octobre 1996, pp. 24–32.
- ‘Les Conradiens : un débat toujours ouvert’, en collaboration avec Jean-Pierre Poly, Francia, 23,1 (1996) (Prosopographica), p. 135-166.
- ‘Les comtes d’Anjou et leurs alliances aux Xe et XIe siècles’, in K. S. B. Keats-Rohan (éd.), Family trees and the Roots of Politics. Britain and France from the Tenth to the Twelfth Century, Oxford 1997, pp. 211–268.
- ‘L’origine des comtes de Nevers : nouveaux documents’, Onomastique et parenté, I, 2000, pp. 85–112.
- ‘L’apport de l’onomastique à l’étude des ‘fausses’ généalogies carolingiennes’, Onomastique et parenté, I, 2000, pp. 185–229.
- ‘Les vicomtes de Châteaudun et leurs alliés’, Onomastique et parenté, I, 2000, pp. 247–261.
- ‘Les recherches prosopographiques: le haut Moyen Age francais’, History and Computing, (2000), pp. 5972.
- ‘Addenda et Corridenda à Continuité gentilice et continuité familiale : juillet 2000-juillet 2003’ - http://www.linacre.ox.ac.uk/research/prosop/addrome.doc
- ‘Continuité gentilice et continuité familiale à Rome : un choix ou une chance ?’, Ktéma, 30 (2005), pp. 317–344.
- ‘Les Aviti et les évêques de Clermont’, Colloque Saint Julien de Brioude. Actes du colloque international organisé par la ville de Brioude du 22 au 24 sept. 2004, Brioude, 2007, pp. 131–170.
- ‘L’aristocratie méridionale des alentours de l’an mil : faits nouveaux et nouvelles approches’, Brioude aux temps carolingiens. Actes du colloque international organisé par la ville de Brioude 13-15 Septembre 2007, Le Puy-en-Velay, 2010, pp. 140–157.
- ‘Les revendications généalogiques à Athènes à la fin de l’Antiquité’, Les stratégies familiales dans l’Antiquité tardive, éd. Christophe Badel & Christian Settipani, Paris, éd. De Boccard, 2012, pp. 5780.
- ‘Les réseaux familiaux dans l’aristocratie byzantine. Quelques exemples du VIe au XIe siècle’, Histoire des réseaux familiaux dans l’Antiquité et au Moyen Âge. In Memoriam A. Laiou et É. Patlagean, Travaux et Mémoires du Centre d’Histoire et de Civilisation de Byzance, éd. B. Caseau, Paris, 2012, pp. 269–288.
- ‘Stratégies matrimoniales en question. Quelques unions atypiques dans les royaumes carolingiens aux IXe-XIe siècles’, Les stratégies matrimoniale (IXe-XIIIe siècles). Colloque des 25-26 mai 2012 au Centre d’Etudes Supérieures et de Civilisation médiévale, Université de Poitiers, éd. M. Aurell, Brepols, 2013, pp. 4976.
- ‘The Bagratids in the seventh century, between Armenia and Byzantium’, Constructing the 7th century, Travaux et Mémoires XVII, éd. C. Zuckerman, Paris, 2013, pp. 559–578.
- ‘Prosopographie sénatoriale romaine : nouveautés autour des Sextii’, La prosopographie au service des sciences sociales. Colloque international du 29-30 novembre et 1er décembre 2010 à l’Université Jean Moulin, Lyon 3, éd. Bernadette Cabouret et François Demotz, Lyon, 2014, pp. 57–77.
- ‘Pouvoir, religion et conflits familiaux à Byzance au IXe siècle’, Inheritance, Law and Religions in the Ancient and Mediaeval Worlds, éd. B. Caseau et S. R. Huebner (Centre de recherche d’Histoire et Civilisation de Byzance, Monographies 45), Paris 2014, pp. 191–214.

== See also ==
- Descent from antiquity
