= Julianus Pomerius =

African-born abbot and spiritual writer in Gaul (5th century)

Julius Pomerius
- Born: Unknown; Mauritania?
- Died: c. 499-505; Arles, Kingdom of the Franks
- Occupations: Priest; rhetor; grammarian; writer
- Years active: later 5th century
- Known for: teacher of Caesarius of Arles
- Notable work: De vita contemplativa

Julianus Pomerius was a Christian priest in fifth century Gaul. He wrote five treatises, only one of which, De Vita Contemplativa, survives.

== Life ==
He was renowned in rhetoric and grammar and was friends with Ennodius and Ruricius. He appears to have fled from Mauretania, North Africa, to Gaul to escape the Vandals, towards the end of the century. He became an abbot and a teacher of rhetoric at Arles, where he was known as the teacher of Caesarius, a great conservator of Augustine of Hippo's teachings. It is known that their titles probably emphasized the ascetic ideal.

Mary Josephine Suelzer said of Pomerius in her 1947 book Julianus Pomerius, the Contemplative Life:

Caesarius owed this accomplishment (saving Augustine of Hippo's works) to his teacher the African émigré Julianus Pomerius. [He] claims for Pomerius the further distinction of having bequeathed to us the oldest pastoral instruction that survives in the West. Mostly certainly, [Julianus Pomerius] is to be credited with a place of honor in the survival and justification of Augustine's name and teaching; and the thoughtful reader of his one remaining treatise will not deny him his place in the early history of pastoral theology. But who other than patrologists and a few theologians even know the name Pomerius? There are, it is true, several translations of the de vita contemplativa, all of them now very old and none of them in English; but even the specialist finds it extremely difficult to locate one of these in our great libraries.

== The De Vita Contemplativa ==
- The first book of the treatise was based around the question of whether a cleric, embroiled by pastoral duties, could ever attain the rewards of the saint who withdrew from the world.
- The second book of treatise detailed the active life of a good priest, warning against covetousness and advocating abstinence.
- The third book was less specifically aimed at priests and was applicable to all Christians, laity and clergy alike. It delineated the four major vices: pride, cupidity, envy and vanity, of which pride was considered the greatest.
- The third book also dealt with the four virtues: temperance, justice, fortitude and prudence.
- This part of treatise is like a Christian manual and advice is more practical than theoretical.

=== His letters from Ruricius ===
From their correspondence it appears that Ruricius is younger than Pomerius, but is of a higher rank in the church:

Perhaps you marvelled that I wrote to your reverence as brother ... because, just as you are greater in age, you likewise are lesser in rank.

Ruricius's letters to Pomerius are almost sermon-like, in that he takes examples from the Bible in order to justify his own actions:

It happens thus so that divine matters might be communicated to humanity and so that human activities might share in the divinity according to those words of the apostle.

=== Pomerius's Influence in the Early Middle Ages ===
From the mid-eighth century through the mid-ninth, Pomerius's text excerpted a strong influence on readers within the Carolingian realm. Prominent ecclesiastical writers of this era, including Chrodegang of Metz, Paulinus of Aquileia, Halitgar of Cambrai, and Jonas of Orléans, drew from Pomerius, although these writers often misattributed quotations from the De vita contemplativa to Prosper of Aquitaine. Pomerius's work was also frequently utilized in the acta resulting from the Church councils held between 813 and 836.

== Sources ==
- Devisse, Jean. "L'influence de Julien Pomere sur les clercs carolingiens: de la pauvrete aux Ve et IXe siecles." Revue d'histoire de I'église de France 61 (1970): 285–95.
- Klingshirn, William E. Caesarius of Arles: The Making of a Christian Community in Late Antique Gaul. Cambridge, 1994.
- Laistner, M.L.W. "The Influence During the Middle Ages of the Treatise De vita contemplativa and Its Surviving Manuscripts." In The Intellectual Heritage of the Early Middle Ages: Selected Essays by M.L.W. Laistner. 40–56. Edited by Chester G. Starr. New York, 1966.
- Leyser, Conrad. Authority and Asceticism from Augustine to Gregory the Great. Oxford, 2000.
- Markus, Robert A. The End of Ancient Christianity. Cambridge, 1991.
- Plumpe, Joseph C. "Pomeriana." Vigiliae Christianae 1.4 (1947): 227–39.
- Timmermann, Josh. "Sharers in the Contemplative Virtue: Julianus Pomerius's Carolingian Audience." Comitatus 45 (2014): 1-44.
