= Reframing the Feudal Revolution =

Scholarly book on the feudal revolution by Charles West

- First edition cover
- Author: Charles West
- Publication date: 2013
- ISBN: 978-1-107-02886-9

Reframing the Feudal Revolution: Political and Social Transformation Between Marne and Moselle, c. 800–c. 1100 (Cambridge: Cambridge University Press, 2013) (ISBN 978-1-107-02886-9) is a scholarly book by Charles West. It is based on his Ph.D. thesis, 'Upper Lotharingia and Champagne c.850 to c.1100' (University of Cambridge, Faculty of History, 2007).

== Summary ==
The book's key purpose, discussed in the introduction, is to advance discussion of the origins of feudalism. Whereas Georges Duby and his successors had argued from the 1950s that the 'feudal revolution' began in France around the year 1000, but Dominique Barthélemy in the 1990s had led an argument that many of the changes happened around 900, but became obvious in the surviving source-material only later. Others are more closely associated with the twelfth century. West argues that scholarship had reached an impasse and needed new perspectives drawing on earlier evidence. His chosen case study was the area between the rivers Marne and Moselle, corresponding to Champagne and Upper Lotharingia.

The key argument of the book, and its 'biggest departure from the Feudal Revolution model' is that the ninth-century Carolingians, faced with a world in which property rights were not clearly defined, and in which the meanings of rituals were fluid and open to interpretation, spurred a drive to define and formalise social relations, now known loosely as the 'Carolingian reforms'. West argues that while many aspects of Carolingian political life did not survive the collapse of the Carolingian Empire in the 880s, this urge to formalise did. He finds that the driver of feudalisation was not primarily the relationship between fiefs and vassals, but the formalisation of power as property rights (particularly ownership of land), which could then be exchanged. 'The ruling family's monopoly on rule was eventually lost, but in the end that was a mere matter of dynastic accident. It seems more important that had the Carolingian project continued, it would have ended in a world dominated by power so formalised and well-defined that it could in some circumstances even be thought of as property, which is more or less exactly what happened' (p. 263).

The book is arranged chronologically in three parts.

Part I, 'The Parameters of Carolingian Society', is structured as a thesis, antithesis, and synthesis. Chapter 1 shows that the Carolingians' efforts to formalise and integrate institutions of government─not least kingship─were not merely rhetorical and did have significant consequences. Chapter 2, however, shows the validity of counter-arguments that, despite this, formal ideas of offices and property 'dissolve on inspection' (p. 76), revealing a politics that was more unstable, contested and provisional. Chapter 3 synthesises these arguments by arguing that while Carolingians did not create a public state, their cultural reforms did have a profound effect on elites' ways of thinking: 'the impasse ... between top-down approaches and those centred on the local practice of power, which has shadowed the debate on the Feudal Revolution, can be dismantled. We need to think of symbolic practices reaching throughout society, with eminently practical consequences' (p. 104). This chapter has been seen as 'the keystone of the entire book'.

Part II, 'The Long Tenth Century, c. 880–c. 1030', examines a period where evidence is particularly hard to interpret, essentially bridging the better understood periods on either side. West uses the clearer evidence of sections 1 and 3 to establish a framework, and tries provisionally to interpret the disparate evidence about the tenth century through this framework. Chapter 4 argues that the weaker kingship evident in the post-Carolingian period may have been a consequence of the Carolingians' own project of formalising and stabilising the power of the aristocracy, and so a symptom of wider social change rather than a cause of it. Chapter 5, correspondingly, argues that the tenth century saw a process of 'symbolic impoverishment', whereby the social meanings of rituals and practices became less fluid and more fixed. Thus, rather than being defined through relationships with the royal court, the position of count (comes) came to be legally stable on its own terms, independently of the ruling dynasty.

Part III, 'The Exercise of Authority through Property Rights, c. 1030–c. 1130' argues that the emergence of feudalism was a knock-on effect of ninth-century Carolingian reforms. Chapter 6 focuses on the emergence of so-called 'bannal lordship' and argues that the eleventh century saw the emergence of a more tightly defined concept of land ownership familiar today but not before. Whereas before aristocrats might pass on their office to their successors, in the twelfth century they could pass on the ownership of land: a 'precipitation of rights' into a form of 'petrified social power'. Whereas the exercise of power had once been quite improvisatory, 'in the late eleventh century, lords everywhere were busily working out whether they had the right' to extract rents and dues (p. 196). Chapter 7 is the book's closest engagement with Susan Reynolds's seminal Fiefs and Vassals, and argues amongst other things that the ecclesiastical Investiture Dispute is evidence for a more general enthusiasm for defining and constituting more precisely social roles, statuses, laws and rituals. Finally, chapter 8 compares and contrasts Champagne and Upper Lotharingia, considering how different political conditions in these parts of the former Carolingian Empire cast light on West's thesis. 'Judicial rights emerged from the undifferentiated authority of the ninth century everywhere; it was merely the means by which they did so that differed. East of the Meuse, the process took place in a more ordered way, managed by the kings and co-ordinated by the exploitation of intact ecclesiastical estates; in the west, with less co-ordination provided either by ecclesiastical estates or the royal court, there was greater fragmentation' (p. 254).

== Reviews ==
- Shami Ghosh, 'Medieval Revolution and Reform Review Article', Reviews in History, review no 1651 (September 2014), DOI: 10.14296/RiH/2014/1651
- Levi Roach, History, 99 (2014), 305–7. DOI: 10.1111/1468-229X.12057_4
- Theo Riches, Early Medieval Europe, 24 (2016), 261–63
- Simon John, English Historical Review, 130 (2015), 692-94. DOI: 10.1093/ehr/cev099
