= Stephen D. White =

American historian (born 1945)

Stephen D. White (born April 16, 1945) is an American historian. White graduated from Harvard University in 1965 with a bachelor's degree. In 1972, he earned his PhD in history with a study of Edward Coke. White taught history at Harvard from 1968 to 1970, history and literature for the two years following. From 1972 to 1975 he was a lecturer at Harvard University. From 1975 to 1980, White taught as Assistant Professor of History, then Associate Professor of History from 1980 to 1985, and Professor of History at Wesleyan University from 1985 to 1989. From 1982 to 1983 he was a visiting member of the Institute for Advanced Study. White joined the faculty of Emory University in 1989, serving as the Asa G. Candler Professor of Medieval History until his retirement in 2013. In 1993/94 he was a visiting professor at the University of St Andrews and was appointed a fellow of the Norwegian Academy of Science and Letters and of the Medieval Academy of America.

His research interests are medieval France and Britain. He explored the conflict management and settlement in high medieval France, and other diverse aspects of political, legal and social history. In his study into the Bayeux Tapestry, White has "cautioned against reading it as an English or Norman story, showing how the animal fables visible in the borders may instead offer a commentary on the dangers of conflict and the futility of pursuing power". A festschrift in his honor was published in 1991.

== Publications ==
- Re-thinking Kinship and Feudalism in Early Medieval Europe. Aldershot 2005, ISBN 0-86078-960-8.
- Feuding and Peace-making in Eleventh-century France. Aldershot 2005, ISBN 0-86078-961-6.
- Custom, Kinship, and Gifts to Saints. The Laudatio Parentum in Western France, 1050–1150. Chapel Hill 1988, ISBN 0-8078-1779-1
- Sir Edward Coke and the Grievances of the Commonwealth. Manchester 1979, ISBN 0-7190-0759-3.
