= Caesariana =

Caesariana or Cæsariana may refer to the following places in/since Roman Antiquity:

- Caesariana (Numidia), modern Kessaria in Algeria, former bishopric and present Latin titular see
- Caesariana (Pannonia), in Pannonia province, modern Baláca in Hungary, a military settlement
