= Caesaria the Younger =

French abbess

Caesaria the Younger or Caesaria II (died c. 560) was the abbess of Saint-Jean d'Arles from around 525 until her death.

== Life ==
Caesaria was a relative of Bishop Caesarius of Arles, probably a niece. She succeeded the bishop's sister, Caesaria the Elder, as abbess around 525. She was appointed by Caesarius, who issued a revised rule for the convent on 22 June 534 granting the nuns the right to elect their abbess in the future. Around the same time, he made his last will and testament, in which he bequeathed Caesaria a cloak which she had previously made for him.

Sometime after Caesarius's death in 542, Caesaria commissioned Cyprian of Toulon to write his biography. She may have intended it to counter the influence of a new monastery founded by Aurelian of Arles in 547. Cyprian describes her abbacy thus: "Her work with her companions is so outstanding that in the midst of psalms and fasts, vigils and readings, the virgins of Christ beautifully copy out the holy books, with their mother herself as teacher." Sometime between 552 and 557, she sent a copy of Caesarius's rule for nuns, the Regula virginum, to Queen Radegund, who used it for her own foundation of Holy Cross Abbey in Poitiers.

Caesaria died around 560 and was succeeded as abbess by Liliola. In a poem addressed to Radegund after Caesaria's death, Venantius Fortunatus expresses that wish that "renowned Caesaria and the other Caesaria rise up in this place [Holy Cross] so that through you their former honour may be renewed."

== Letter ==
A letter by Caesaria addressed to Radegund and Richild is preserved in a single tenth- or eleventh-century manuscript, Codex Trecensis 1248, alongside two biographies of Radegund. It was sent along with the Regula virginum in response to a request from Radegund, whose letter is not preserved. The identity of Richild is uncertain, but it may be the birth name of Radegund's spiritual daughter, Agnes. Caesaria's letter has been translated into English.

The tone of the letter is "episcopal" and unemotional. Caesaria was probably elderly at the time of writing. She quotes extensively from a letter of Caesarius to Caesaria the Elder containing the same ideas eventually put into the rule. She also quotes extensively from the Bible, especially the Psalms and the Gospels. Her letter is the most densely scriptural of all letters surviving from Merovingian Gaul. This level of scriptural quotation is mainly associated with bishops.

Caesaria's advice to Radegund is mostly conventional. She insists that nuns be literate and advises Radegund against excessive asceticism. In line with her use of the Bible, she recommends regularly reading the Gospels and memorizing the Psalms. Although Caesaria's letter is a valuable survival for its "articulate, intelligent, strong" voice, the extensive quotation of scripture "to the modern mind ... appear overdone to the point where they weaken the overall effect rather than enhance it."

== Bibliography ==
- Klingshirn, William E. (1994a). Caesarius of Arles: The Making of a Christian Community in Late Antique Gaul. Cambridge University Press.
- Klingshirn, William E. (1994b). Caesarius of Arles: Life, Testament, Letters. Liverpool University Press.
- Klingshirn, William E. (2018). "Caesaria the Younger". In Nicholson, Oliver (ed.). The Oxford Dictionary of Late Antiquity, Volume 1: A–I. Oxford: Oxford University Press. p. 281. ISBN 978-0-19-881624-9.
- McNamara, Jo Ann; Halborg, John E.; Whatley, E. Gordon, eds. (1992). Sainted Women of the Dark Ages. Duke University Press.
- Tyrrell, V. Alice (2019). Merovingian Letters and Letter Writers. Brepols.
