= Caesaria the Elder =

French abbess

Saint Caesaria the Elder Abbess
- Born: unknown
- Residence: Arles, France
- Died: c. 530
- Venerated in: Catholic Church
- Feast: January 12

Caesaria the Elder or Caesaria I (died c. 530) was a saint and abbess. Little is known about her, but there were some "glowing" references to her in the writings of Venantius Fortunatus; according to Gregory of Tours, her life was "blessed and holy". She was born in a Gallo-Roman family and was trained at John Cassian's foundation in Marseilles.

Caesaria was the first abbess of convent of Saint-Jean, which was founded by her brother, Caesarius of Arles. The exact location of the convent is unknown, but it was probably built outside the walls of Arles in southern France, and remained there until the French Revolution in 1789. Her brother addressed his Regula ad Virgines ("Rule for Virgins") to Caesaria, and described how she taught and supervised the copying of the Bible at the convent. The nuns at St. Jean Convent spent their time in prayer, caring for the poor by washing and mending their clothes, doing menial work such as needlework, weaving, and transcribing books. They "lived in permanent enclosure", were not allowed meat except during illnesses, and did not bathe during Lent. Caesarius' contemporaries viewed the convent as "an ark of salvation for women in those stormy times"; the pope approved of and supported the work done there. By the time of Caesarius' death in 542, 200 nuns lived there.

Caesaria might have died in about 525; she was buried in a basilica next to the tomb reserved for Caesarius. According to hagiographer Alban Butler, the date of Caesaria's death is uncertain. Her niece, Caesaria the Younger, succeeded her as abbess. Caesaria's feast day is January 12.

== Works cited ==
- Klingshirn, William E. (2004). Caesarius of Arles: The Making of a Christian Community in Late Antique Gaul. Cambridge: Cambridge University Press. p. 105. ISBN 978-0-511-58387-2. OCLC 55719240
- McNamara, Jo Ann; Halborg, John E.; Whatley, E. Gordon (1992). Sainted Women of the Dark Ages. Durham, England: Duke University Press. ISBN 978-0-8223-8236-2. OCLC 55716176
