= Michael Frassetto =

American historian

- Born: Michael Frassetto; December 3, 1961 (age 64); Allentown, Pennsylvania, United States
- Education: La Salle University (1983); Michigan State University (1985); University of Delaware (1993)
- Occupations: Historian, writer
- Writing career
- Subject: History of medieval Europe

Michael Frassetto (born December 3, 1961) is an American historian, university professor and author.

== Background and family ==
Michael Frassetto was born in Allentown, Pennsylvania, to Eugene Frassetto, a computer programmer, and Joy Frassetto.

He married Jill R. Allen on September 8, 1984. He resides in Medford, New Jersey.

== Education ==
Frassetto earned his bachelor's degree from La Salle University in 1983, and his master's degree from Michigan State University in 1985. He was awarded a Fulbright scholarship, undertaking research for his dissertation in Berlin in 1989 and 1990, and received his doctorate from the University of Delaware in 1993. His dissertation was on Ademar of Chabannes.

== Career ==
Frassetto is a contributor to the Encyclopedia Britannica and has been their religion editor.

He is an adjunct professor in the Department of History at the University of Delaware. His special interests are medieval European history, the history of Christianity, and interfaith relations during the Middle Ages.

=== Awards and recognition ===
- Fulbright scholar, 1989
- Grant from National Endowment for the Humanities, 1993
- Member of the Medieval Academy of America

== Selected works ==
=== Books ===
Frassetto has authored a number of books which include:

- Christians and Muslims in the Middle Ages: From Muhammad to Dante. Rowman & Littlefield. November 12, 2019. ISBN 978-1-4985-7757-1.
- The Early Medieval World: From the Fall of Rome to the Time of Charlemagne. [2 volumes]. Santa Barbara, California (US): ABC-CLIO. 2013. ISBN 978-1-59884-995-0.
- The Great Medieval Heretics: Five Centuries of Religious Dissent. New York: BlueBridge. 2008. ISBN 978-1-933346-12-0. Ixtheo record
- Heretic Lives: Medieval Heresy from Bogomil and the Cathars to Wyclif and Hus. London: Profile Books. 2007. ISBN 978-1861977441. OCLC 145389541.

Published works of which Frassetto was the volume editor include:

- Frassetto, Michael, ed. (May 2018). Voices of the European Middle Ages: Contemporary Accounts of Daily Life. ABC-CLIO. ISBN 978-1-61069-821-4.
- Encyclopedia of Barbarian Europe: Society in Transformation. Bloomsbury Publishing USA. May 23, 2003. ISBN 978-1-85109-586-5.
- The Year 1000: Religious and Social Response to the Turning of the First Millennium. Palgrave Macmillan US. February 6, 2003. ISBN 978-1-4039-6029-0.

=== Chapters and essays ===
Chapters by Frassetto in edited works include:

- Prudlo, Donald S., ed. (February 28, 2019). "Precursors to Religious Inquisitions: Anti-heretical Efforts to 1184". A Companion to Heresy Inquisitions. Brill. pp. 41–72. doi:10.1163/9789004393875_004. ISBN 978-90-04-39387-5.

Frassetto has contributed essays or chapters to a number of collections of which he was also the editor (or co-editor). These include:

- Frassetto, Michael; Hosler, John; Gabriele, Matthew, eds. (January 1, 2014). "Ademar of Chabannes and the Peace of God". Where Heaven and Earth Meet: Essays on Medieval Europe in Honor of Daniel F. Callahan. Studies in the History of Christian Traditions. Brill. pp. 122–137. doi:10.1163/9789004274167_009. ISBN 978-90-04-27416-7.
- Frassetto, Michael, ed. (December 13, 2006). "Heretics and Jews in the early eleventh century: The writings of Rodulfus Glaber and Ademar of Chabannes". Christian Attitudes Toward the Jews in the Middle Ages: A Casebook. Routledge. ISBN 978-1-135-86641-9.
- Frassetto, Michael, ed. (January 1, 2005). "Pagans, Heretics, Saracens, and Jews in the Sermons of Ademar of Chabannes". Heresy and the Persecuting Society in the Middle Ages. Studies in the History of Christian Traditions. Series editor: Robert J. Bast. Brill. pp. 73–91. doi:10.1163/9789047409489_008. ISBN 978-90-474-0948-9.
- Blanks, David R.; Frassetto, Michael, eds. (1999). "The Image of the Saracen as Heretic in the Sermons of Ademar of Chabannes". Western Views of Islam in Medieval and Early Modern Europe: Perception of Other. New York: Palgrave Macmillan US. pp. 83–96. doi:10.1057/9780312299675_4. ISBN 978-0-312-29967-5.

=== Journal articles ===
Articles by Frassetto that have appeared in scholarly journals include:

- "Augustine's Doctrine of Witness and Attitudes toward the Jews in the Eleventh Century". Church History and Religious Culture. 87 (3): 287–304. January 1, 2007. doi:10.1163/187124107X232435. ISSN 1871-2428.
- "Resurrection of the Body: Eleventh–Century Evidence from the Sermons of Ademar of Chabannes". Journal of Religious History. 26 (3): 235–249. October 2002. doi:10.1111/1467-9809.t01-1-00154. ISSN 0022-4227.
- "Heretics and Jews in the Writings of Ademar of Chabannes and the Origins of Medieval Anti-Semitism". Church History. 71 (1): 1–15. March 2002. doi:10.1017/S0009640700095135. ISSN 1755-2613.
- "The writings of Ademar of Chabannes, the Peace of 994, and the 'Terrors of the Year 1000'". Journal of Medieval History. 27 (3): 241–255. September 2001. doi:10.1016/S0304-4181(01)00010-0. ISSN 0304-4181.
- "Reaction and Reform: Reception of Heresy in Arras and Aquitaine in the Early Eleventh Century". The Catholic Historical Review. 83 (3): 385–400. 1997. doi:10.1353/cat.1997.0050. ISSN 1534-0708.
