= Caesarius of Arles =

Merovingian monk, archbishop and saint

Saint Caesarius of Arles
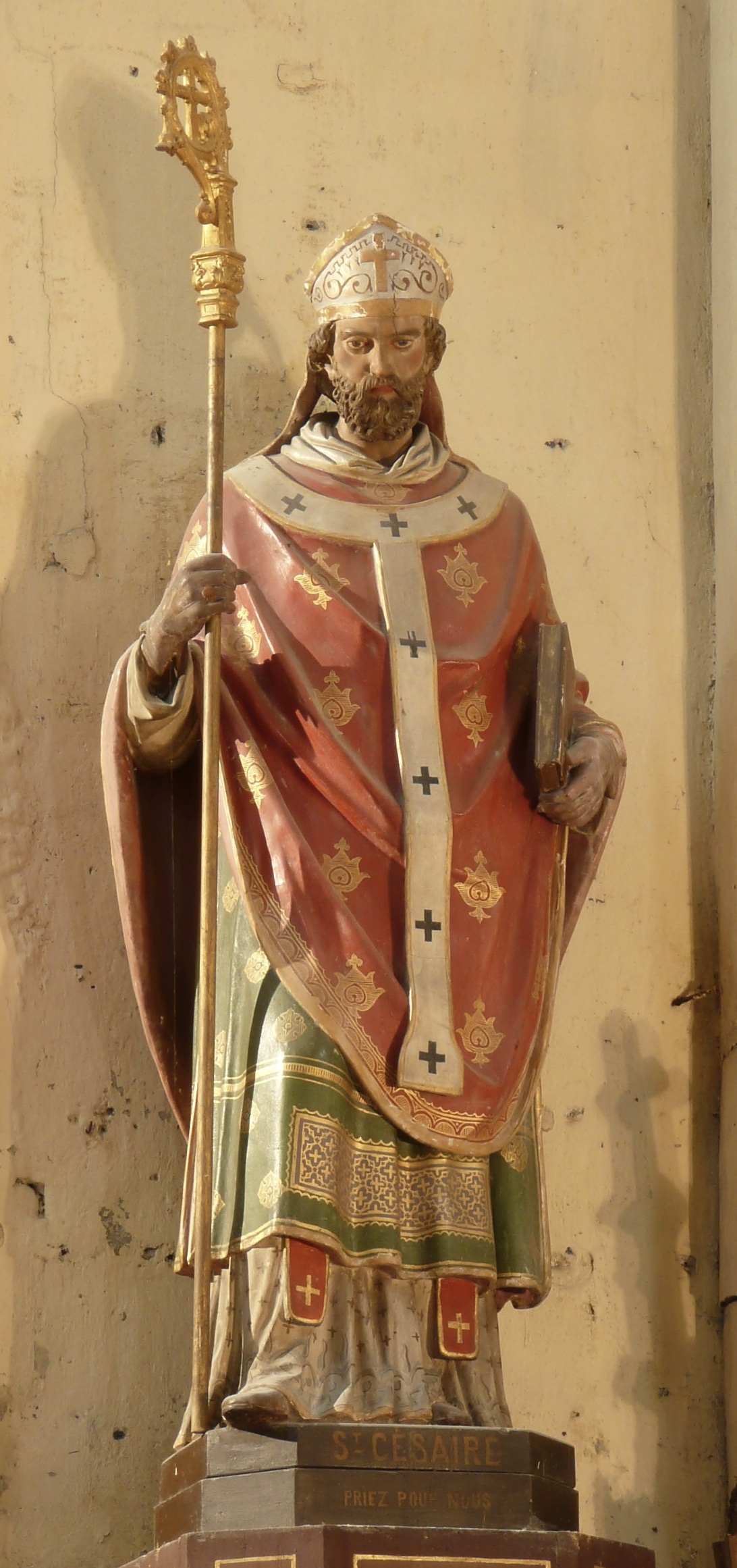
- Statue of St. Caesarius of Arles in the Church of St. Caesarius (Arles, France)

Monk and Bishop
- Born: 468/470 AD; Chalon-sur-Saône, Western Roman Empire
- Died: 27 August 542 AD; Arles, Francia
- Venerated in: Catholic Church; Eastern Orthodox Church
- Feast: August 27

Caesarius of Arles (Latin: Caesarius Arelatensis; 468/470 – 27 August 542 AD), sometimes called "of Chalon" (Cabillonensis or Cabellinensis) from his birthplace Chalon-sur-Saône, was the foremost ecclesiastic of his generation in Merovingian Gaul. Caesarius is considered to be of the last generation of church leaders of Gaul who worked to integrate large-scale ascetic elements into the Western Christian tradition. William E. Klingshirn's study of Caesarius depicts Caesarius as having the reputation of a "popular preacher of great fervour and enduring influence". Among those who exercised the greatest influence on Caesarius were Augustine of Hippo, Julianus Pomerius, and John Cassian.

The most important problem for Caesarius was the efficiency of the bishop's fulfillment of his pastoral duties. By that time, preaching had already become part of the standard church service in Gaul; many bishops recognized the importance of such a means of teaching morals and encouraged it. However, Caesarius' enthusiasm was outstanding in its own way, and he urged his clergy to preach as often as possible, in the church and outside it, to the willing and the opposing. Caesarius' sermon topics generally dealt with moral issues.

== Life ==
Map of participants of the Council of Agde in 506 AD, presided by Caesarius. (in French)

Caesarius was born at what is now Chalon-sur-Saône, to Roman-Burgundian parents in the last years of the Western Empire. His sister, Caesaria, to whom he addressed his "Regula ad Virgines" (Rule for Virgins), would later preside over the convent he had founded. At the time of his birth, Germanic kings de facto governed Burgundy despite nominal Roman administration. Unlike his parents, Caesarius developed a very strong and intense feeling for religion which alienated him from his family for the majority of his adolescence. Caesarius left home at seventeen and studied under Bishop Sylvester for a few years. Afterwards, he found his way to Lérins (Lerinum), an island monastery, which was known to be a major dynamo for creative forces of work in the Church of Roman Gaul. After training as a monk at Lérins he devoted himself to reading and applying the scripture in hopes of improving the quality and organization of Christian life and serving the poor. He rapidly became master of all the learning and discipline the monastery communicated and was appointed cellarer. However, he proved unpopular at Lérins when, as cellarer of the monastery, he withheld food from monks because he felt they were insufficiently austere. As a result, the abbot Porcarius removed Caesarius from his post, whereupon he began starving himself; the abbot intervened and sent Caesarius to Arles ostensibly for medical care. After living at Lérins for over a decade and his health steadily decreasing from monastic over-exertion, Caesarius sought out a different clerical Christian community in Arles.

Upon arriving in the city, the Vita Caesarii claims that Caesarius discovered, completely to his surprise, that the bishop of Arles - Aeonius - was a kinsman from Chalon (concivis pariter et propinquus - "at once a fellow citizen and a relative"). Aeonius later ordained his young relative deacon and then priest. For three years he presided over a monastery in Arles; but of this building no vestige is now left.

At the death of Aeonius the clergy, citizens, and persons in authority proceeded, as Aeonius himself had suggested, to elect Caesarius to the vacant seat, although Klingshirn suggests that there may have been considerable local hostility, that Caesarius' election may have been heavily disputed and that another cleric, Iohannes, who appears in the episcopal fasti of Arles may have been elected bishop. Caesarius was consecrated in 502, being probably about 33 years of age. In the fulfilment of his new duties he was courageous and unworldly, but yet exhibited great power of kindly adaptation. He took great pains to induce the laity to join in the sacred offices, and encouraged inquiry into points not made clear in his sermons. He also ordered the people to study Holy Scripture at home, and treat the word of God with the same reverence as the sacraments. His concern for the poor and sick was famous throughout and beyond Gaul as he regularly provided ransom for prisoners and aided the sick and the poor. He was specially zealous in redeeming captives, even selling church ornaments for this purpose.

By middle age, Caesarius had "become and was to remain the leading ecclesiastical statesman and spiritual force of his age". In September 506 he presided over the Council of Agde in Languedoc. Attended by thirty-five bishops, it dealt primarily with church discipline.

As bishop, Caesarius lived in a political world whose main theme was competition for Southern Gallic control among the Visigothic, Ostrogothic and Frankish kingdoms which led him to the constant ransoming of victims during these wars. The aftermath of a siege in 507–508 between the Burgundians and Franks and Visigothic and Ostrogothic kingdoms was devastating to its citizens. Peasants had no food supply and were in danger of enslavement, exile and death. Although Caesarius saved and ransomed many countryside citizens, his actions in redeeming captives were quite controversial. Although he ransomed many peasants of his country, he also ransomed numerous barbarians and enemies of the city. He defended himself by stating that barbarians were human beings and therefore had the potential to enter the City of God.

A notary named Licinianus denounced Caesarius to Alaric II as one who desired to subjugate the civitas of Arles to Burgundian rule. Caesarius was exiled to Bordeaux, but on the discovery of his innocence, was speedily allowed to return. He interceded for the life of his calumniator. Later, when Arles was besieged by Theodoric around the year 512, he was again accused of treachery and imprisoned. An interview with the Ostrogothic king at Ravenna the next year speedily dispelled these troubles, and the remainder of his episcopate was passed in peace.

Some rivalry appears to have existed in the sixth century between the sees of Arles and Vienne, but was adjusted by Pope Leo, whose adjustment was confirmed by Pope Symmachus. Caesarius was in favour at Rome. A book he wrote against the semi-Pelagians, entitled de Gratia et Libero Arbitrio, was approved and circulated by Pope Felix IV; and the canons passed at Orange were approved by Pope Boniface II. The learned antiquary Louis Thomassin believed him to have been the first Western bishop to receive a pallium from the pope. François Guizot in Civilisation en France cites part of one of Caesarius' sermons as that of a representative man of his age; while August Neander eulogizes his "unwearied, active, and pious zeal, ready for every sacrifice in the spirit of love," and his moderation on the controversy concerning semi-Pelagianism.

The old Roman political order seemed to have little significance to Caesarius who instead directed his attitude to reflecting and accepting Christian pragmatism.

== Religious beginnings ==
According to William Klingshirn, "Caesarius also has the reputation of being the faithful champion of Augustine of Hippo in the early middle ages." Thus Augustine's writings are seen to have profoundly shaped Caesarius' vision of human community, both inside and outside the cloister; and Caesarius' prowess as a popular preacher is understood to follow from his close attention to the example of the bishop of Hippo. Caesarius was also highly influenced by his teacher, Julianus Pomerius. Pomerius had been inspired by the life of Augustine of Hippo too and insisted that bishops and members of the clergy live more like monks as opposed to aristocrats. This meant that any luxurious behaviour, such as participating in bountiful banquets, enlarging estates and enjoying "secular" learning, was condemned. Instead Pomerius urged bishops to give away all their riches and personal wealth as well as dress and eat simply. Caesarius's monasticism led him to the movement of church reform and he became one of its most influential spokesmen. According to many of his testaments he stayed true to the teachings of Pomerius and Augustine by rejecting secular learning, shunning comfortable living and organizing his clergy into monastic living.

Christianization in the late Roman and Early Medieval West was a slow, inconsistent and incomplete social and religious change. It required the building of churches, conversion of elites and a widespread adoption of Christian self-identity with a system of Christian values, practices and beliefs. The church was constantly struggling against the survival of superstitions and pagan practices that were widely common among communities and common folk. However, it was only with the consent and participation of local populations that these religious changes were able to take effect. Therefore, as Klingshirn so carefully puts it, this process was reciprocal. Although the elites and theologians implemented all of the goals and strategies, it was up to the peasants and townspeople of local communities to accept these practices.

Caesarius composed two rules, one for men ("Ad Monachos"), the other for women ("Ad Virgines"). The rule for monks is based on that of Lérins, as handed down by oral tradition. This rule soon gave way to the Rule of Columbanus.

As a preacher, Caesarius displayed great knowledge of Scripture, and was eminently practical in his exhortations. Besides reproving ordinary vices of humanity, he had often to contend against lingering pagan practices, as auguries, or heathen rites on the calends. His sermons on the Old Testament are not critical, but dwell on its typical aspects.

Several volumes of his sermons have been published in Sources Chrétiennes.

== Writings and teachings ==
Caesarius has over 250 surviving sermons in his corpus. His sermons reveal him as a pastor dedicated to the formation of the clergy and the moral education of the laity. He preached on Christian beliefs, values, and practices against pagan syncretism. He emphasizes the life of a Christian as well as the love of God, reading the scriptures, asceticism, psalmody, love for one's neighbour, and the judgement that would come.

Through Pomerius's teachings, it is logical to conclude that many of Caesarius' homilies and writings were influenced greatly by Augustine. Caesarius' writings were known to be adapted as he reworked many other philosophers' introductions and conclusions, especially those of Augustine. Many of his writings and sermons, including the popular Vita Caesarii, were ordered to be written in French, German, Italian, and Spanish. Caesarius did not believe that his readings and sermons should be restricted to the clergy. He did not just address the upper class and elite but instead preached to many literate and near-literate bishops, abbots, parish priests, and monks. He encouraged the clergy to read to both themselves and others. He targeted the illiterate and asked that they hire others to read to them after church in order to absorb the divine lessons. Caesarius encouraged reading divine lessons both at church and in their homes, at night and during the day, alone and with family.

More than just learning and understanding the lessons, Caesarius emphasized that a "believer who does not share what he has learned, is not achieving what God intended". Therefore, the believer is given a large responsibility as the lectio (divine reading) is God and therefore he should not be denied access to what belongs to Him. Caesarius believed that Christian People were God's new "elect" and he idealized incorporating men of places from all over the world into a believing, peaceful, and loving human community. This belief parallels Augustinian work as Augustine often referred to the populus christianus which can be translated as the Christian People. Revelation tells that God made a covenant with the populus christianus and the Christian epoch was predicted in all of the scriptures.

Scholars have remarked on two aspects of Caesarius's teaching and activity that deserve considerable attention. The first aspect deals with Caesarius who was stated to be "the creative leader" who arranged at the Council of Orange in 529 a resolution of the century of disputes about grace and 'good works' which followed Augustine's death.

=== Council of Orange, 529 ===
The most important local council over which Caesarius presided was that of Orange (529). Its statements on the subject of grace and free agency have been eulogized by modern historians (see, e.g., Canon Bright, Church History, ch. xi. ad fin.). The following propositions are laid down in the Council of Orange's canon 25:

"This also do we believe, in accordance with the Catholic faith, that after grace received through baptism, all the baptized are able and ought, with the aid and co-operation of Christ, to fulfil all duties needful for salvation, provided they are willing to labour faithfully. But that some men have been predestinated to evil by divine power, we not only do not believe, but if there be those who are willing to believe so evil a thing, we say to them with all abhorrence anathema. This also do we profess and believe to our soul's health, that in every good work, it is not we who begin, and are afterwards assisted by Divine mercy, but that God Himself, with no preceding merits on our part, first inspires within us faith and love."

On the express ground that these doctrines are as needful for the laity as for the clergy, certain distinguished laymen (illustres ac magnifici viri) were invited to sign these canons. They are accordingly subscribed by eight laymen, and at least twelve bishops, including Caesarius.

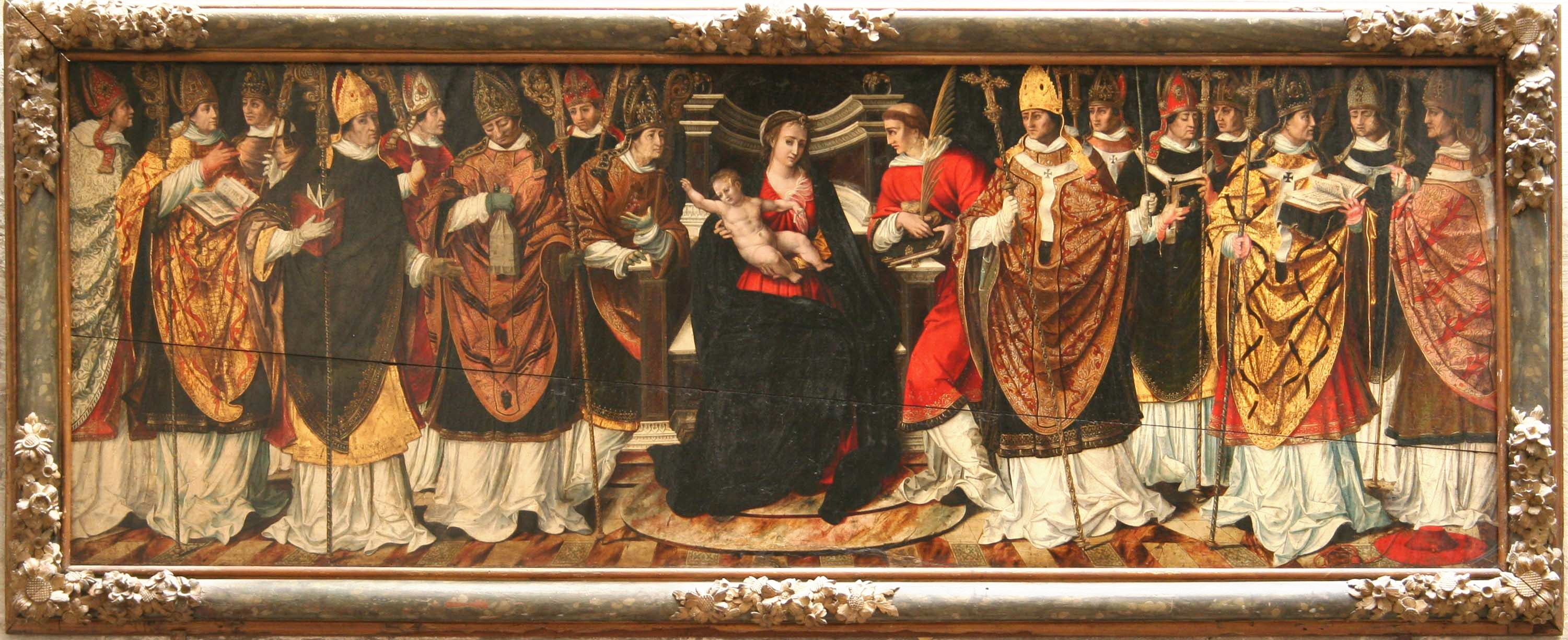
Provincial council, probably representing the condemnation of the bishop Contumeliosus, sixth from the left

The Council of Orange in 529 was said to have condemned "the teaching of grace that predominated in southern Gaul in favor of a modified Augustinian position."

=== Sermons ===
The second aspect of Caesarius's teaching that deserves attention is his sermons. As mentioned previously, his corpus consists of over 250 surviving sermons. Caesarius was determined to edit, shorten, and simplify his sermons in order to make them more effective and available to the existing patristic tradition. About 1/3 of his sermons are efforts of this sort. His works travelled to all parts of the Christian West, spreading his medieval sermon tradition and its topics of Christian love, the meaning of the last Judgement, the rights of the poor and the notion of Christianity. His writings were used by monks in Germany, repeated in Anglo-Saxon poetry and turned up in the important works of Gatianus of Tours and Thomas Aquinas.

In DelCogliano's article, he mentions two other historians who studied and presented new critical texts of Caesarius's sermons. The two historians, Courreau and Vogüé, noted that although Caesarius's monastic sermons contain their own perspective and emphasis, his teachings are largely consistent throughout all of his sermons. Certain recurring themes include the expectations of monks in the monastery (i.e., important to attain Christian salvation within the safe haven of a monastery with the help of God) as well as being assisted on this Christian journey by fellow brothers who must offer mutual support. Caesarius, unlike other monks like Anthony the Great, did not believe in solitude in order to be blessed with the Grace of God; instead he emphasized brothers living amongst each other and providing edification and a good example to one another.

=== A Rule for women ===
Caesarius' Regula virginum (512), also known as the Rule for Virgins, is the first western rule written exclusively for women. In this text, Caesarius argues for the practice of claustration, the complete containment of women in the monastery from their entry until death. Caesarius also created a strict regime for women in the monasteries to adhere to, specifying times for prayer, limits on earthly luxuries such as fine clothes and elaborate decoration, and standards of modesty and piety. Caesarius begins the "Rule" by prefacing that the virgins for which he was writing this rule were the "gems of the Church" as they, "with God's help, evade the jaws of spiritual wolves." He also composed a letter of guidance, Vereor, for the women of his religious community in its early stages. As mentioned earlier, Caesarius was captured and later returned from Bordeaux. After he returned he began to build a monastery for women outside of Arles. The monastery was built for a group of ascetic women living under the spiritual direction of his sister, Caesaria. It can be assumed that most of the women entering the monastery were from elite families, as there were strict provisions in "Regula Virginum" against having servants, luxurious clothes, and excessive decoration. There had been no monastery for women in Arles which allowed Caesarius, possibly in the imitation of Augustine, to provide women with an equal opportunity for a monastic life. Caesarius viewed the women in the monastery as having a religious advantage in being separated from the anxieties and responsibilities of daily life in the city, as they were able to devote themselves to a life of piety:

"And therefore I ask you, oh sacred virgins and souls dedicated to God, who with you lamps shining await with clear conscience the coming of the Lord, that, because you know that I labored to establish a monastery for you, you with your prayers might ask that I be made a companion on your journey; and that, when you shall enter joyfully into the kingdom with the wise and holy virgins, you might obtain by your plea that I not remain outside with the foolish ones."

Caesarius kept the monastery in his family until his death. Around 525, he appointed his niece, Caesaria the Younger, to succeed his sister.

== Influence ==
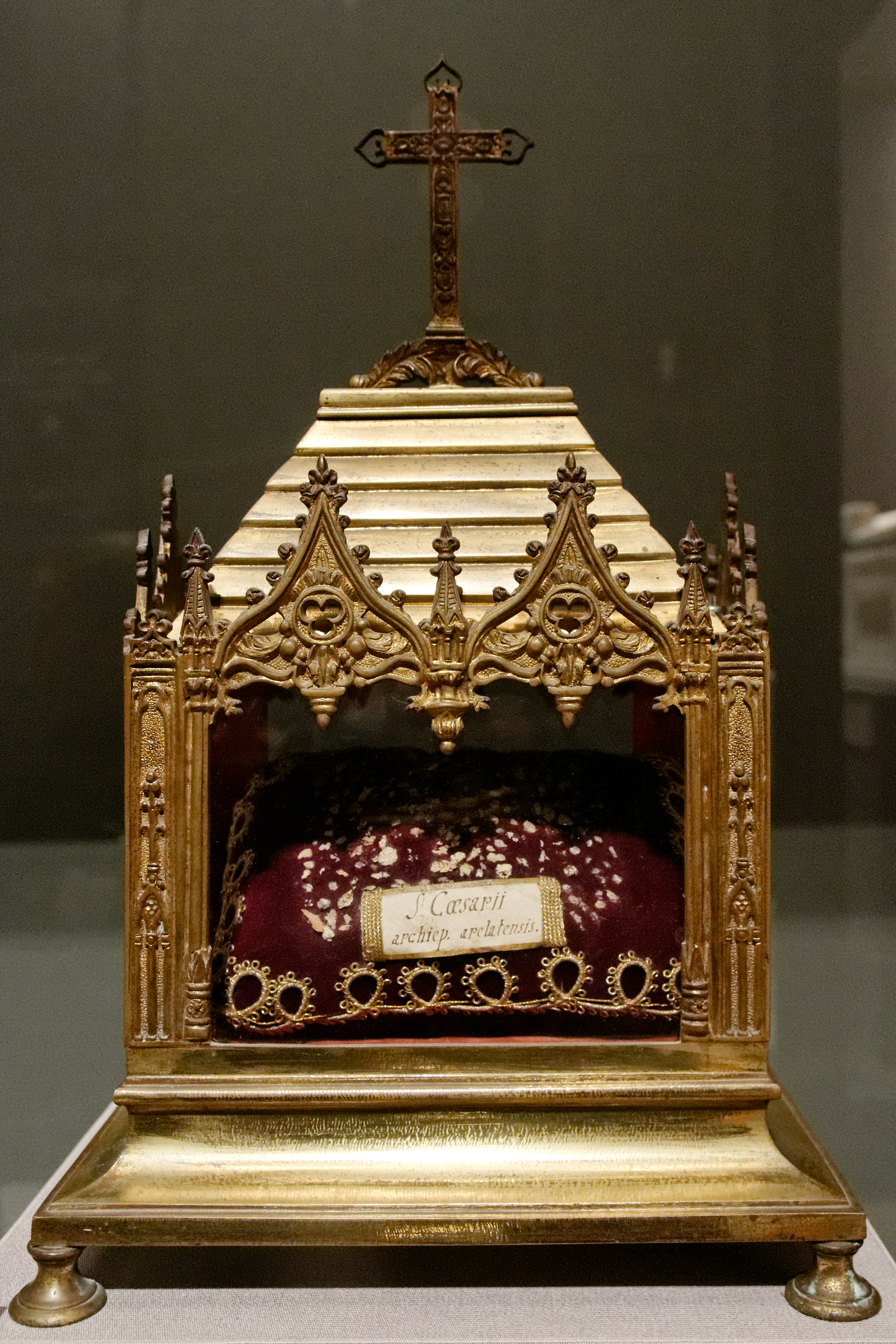
19th-century reliquary of St Caesarius, Church of St. Trophime in Arles

As the occupant of an important see, the bishop of Arles exercised considerable official, as well as personal, influence. Caesarius was liberal in the loan of sermons, and sent suggestions for discourses to priests and even bishops living in Spain, Italy, and elsewhere in Gaul. The great doctrinal question of his age and country was that of semi-Pelagianism. Caesarius, though evidently a disciple of Augustine, displayed in this respect considerable independence of thought. His vigorous denial of anything like predestination to evil has caused a difference in the honour paid to his memory, according as writers incline respectively towards the Jesuit or Jansenist views concerning divine grace.

In Daly's article on Caesarius of Arles, he suggested that Caesarius in many ways may have anticipated the medieval notion of Christendom. His concern for others, redemption of captives and establishing bonds of peace, have been seen as a function of 'his basic theology of love'. Unlike Augustine, who was a supporter and founder of the theology of Christian love, Caesarius stressed the clarification and integration of implications for spiritual activism. Caesarius promoted that God put the exercise of love in every man's reach. Klingshirn backs up this statement in his article when he describes how Caesarius was concerned with the barbarians and enemies of Arles as they were still within the City of God and therefore deserved redemption.

According to the previously mentioned scholars and historians who have written on Caesarius such as Arbesmann, Daly, DelCogliano, Ferreiro and Klingshirn, Caesarius lived through an era full of many societal shifts. Historians have stated that Caesarius was caught up in its early stages and lacked historical "hindsight and perspective" to this era. However, he witnessed and understood the beginning of the vast societal shifts which surrounded him and intentionally set out to shape this process. This was an influential stance as it has been said that the displacement of Roman by European civilization was a long-lasting, complex, and mystifying process. Caesarius dreamed and saw an "expanding, world-embracing, world-uniting society". Caesarius emphasized and spread his treatises and beliefs of patristic tradition to men and women around Arles and surrounding cities. This recognizable social model occurred in a time when social communities were disappearing. Caesarius helped to foresee the institutional shapes of medieval Christendom and may have helped create it, with his ideas circulating for a millennium in the medieval West.

== Works ==
- Sermons, ed. by German Morin, Corpus Christianorum Series Latina, vol. 103–104, Turnhout: Brepols 1953, English translation by Magdeleine Mueller, Caesarius of Arles, Sermons, 3 vols., Washington D.C.: Catholic University of America Press 1956-73 (The Fathers of the Church, vol. 31, 47, 66).
- Rule for nuns, ed. by Adalbert de Vogüé and Joël Courreau, Sources Chrétiennes, vol. 345, Paris: Cerf 1988, pp. 170–272, English translation by Maria Caritas McCarthy, Washington D.C.: Catholic University of America Press 1960.
- Rule for monks, ed. by Adalbert de Vogüé and Joël Courreau, Sources Chrétiennes, vol. 398, Paris: Cerf 1994, pp. 204–226 (not yet translated into English).
- Testament, ed. by Joël Courreau and Adalbert de Vogüé, SC 345, pp. 360–396, English translation in Klingshirn, Caesarius of Arles: Life, Testament, Letters, pp. 71–76.
- Letters, transl. by William E. Klingshirn, Caesarius of Arles: Life, Testament, Letters, Liverpool 1994 (Translated Texts for Historians, vol. 19).

== See also ==
- Christianity in Gaul
- Christianity in the 6th century

== Notes ==
Attribution

== Sources ==
- Life of Caesarius of Arles (VIta Caesarii Arelatensis), by Bishop Cyprian of Toulon and others, ed. by Bruno Krusch, Monumenta Germaniae Historica, vol. 3, Hannover: Hahn 1896, pp. 433-501, English translation by William Klingshirn, Caesarius of Arles: Life, Testament, Letters, Liverpool: Liverpool University Press 1994 (Translated Texts for Historians, vol. 19), pp. 1–70.
- Acts of Councils in Gaul, in Concilia Galliae, vol. 2: a. 511-a. 695, ed. by Charles de Clercq, Corpus Christianorum Series Latina, vol. 148a, Turnhout: Brepols 1963 (not translated into English).
