= Jean-Pierre Poly =

French historian

- Born: 1941
- Awards: Grand prix des Rendez-vous de l'histoire (2003)
- Scientific career
- Fields: History of law and feudalism

Jean-Pierre Poly (born 1941) is a French historian. He was the student of Georges Duby, and graduated with a Phd in History in 1972. He specializes in feudalism.

== Sources ==
- Lorraine (2007). "Concours d'agrégation d'histoire du droit". Université de Lorraine. Université Nancy 2. Archived from the original on 20 February 2011.
- Poly, Jean-Pierre (1972). "La Société féodale en Provence du Xe au XIIe siècle. Contribution à l'étude des structures féodales dans le midi de la Gaule". OCLC 492268525.
