= Francia =

Western European kingdom (c. 481–843)

Kingdom of the Franks Regnum Francorum (Latin)
- 481–843
- Expansion of the Frankish Kingdom, 481–870
- Religion: Catholicism (official)
- Demonyms: Frank, Frankish
- Government: Monarchy
- King
  - c. 481–511 (first): Clovis I
  - 840–843 (last): Contested between Lothair I, Louis the German and Charles the Bald (Note: All three were sons of Louis the Pious.)
- Historical era: Early Middle Ages
  - Clovis I crowned king of the Salian Franks: c. 481
  - Clovis I unites all Franks: 481
  - Charlemagne crowned Emperor of the Romans: 25 December 800
  - Death of Louis the Pious: 20 June 840
  - Treaty of Verdun: c. 10 August 843

Area
- 814 (peak): 1,200,000 km^{2} (460,000 sq mi)
- Currency: Denier (Note: After c. 673)
Preceded by
| Western Roman Empire |
| Kingdom of Soissons |
Succeeded by
| Middle Francia |
| East Francia |
| West Francia |
| Carolingian Empire |

The Kingdom of the Franks (Latin: Regnum Francorum), also known as the Frankish Kingdom or Francia, was the largest post-Roman kingdom in Western Europe. It was established by the Franks, one of the Germanic peoples. During the Early Middle Ages, the kingdom was ruled by the Merovingian and Carolingian dynasties. In 800, it evolved into the Carolingian Empire, thus becoming the longest lasting Germanic kingdom from the era of Great Migrations.

Originally, the core Frankish lands inside the Western Roman Empire were located close to the Rhine and Meuse rivers in the north, but Frankish chiefs such as Chlodio expanded their influence within Roman territory as far as the Somme river in the 5th century.

Childeric I, a Salian Frankish king, was one of several military leaders commanding Roman forces of various ethnic affiliations in northern Roman Gaul. His son, Clovis I, succeeded in unifying most of Gaul under his rule following the collapse of Roman dominion by notably conquering Soissons in 486 and Aquitaine in 507, as well as subduing all the Frankish kingdoms on or near the Rhine frontier; thus founding what became known as the Merovingian dynasty. The dynasty then gained control over a significant part of what is now western and southern Germany.

It was by building upon the basis of these Merovingian deeds that the subsequent Carolingian dynasty—through the nearly continuous campaigns of Pepin of Herstal, his son Charles Martel, grandson Pepin the Short, and great-grandson Charlemagne—secured the greatest expansion of the Frankish state by the early 9th century. Charlemagne was crowned Holy Roman Emperor in 800, thus creating the Frankish-Roman Empire, also referred to as the Carolingian Empire.

Francia was one large polity, generally subdivided into several smaller kingdoms ruled by different members of the ruling dynasties. Whilst these kingdoms coordinated, they also regularly came into conflict with one another. The old Frankish lands, for example, were initially contained within the kingdom of Austrasia, centred on the Rhine and Meuse. The bulk of the former Gallo-Roman territory to its south and west was called Neustria. The borders and number of these subkingdoms varied over time, until a basic split between eastern and western domains became persistent.

After various treaties and conflicts in the late 9th and early 10th centuries, West Francia came under control of the Capetian dynasty, becoming the Kingdom of France, while East Francia and Lotharingia came under the control of the Saxon Ottonian dynasty, becoming the Kingdom of Germany (which would conquer Burgundy and Italy to then form the medieval Holy Roman Empire). Competing French and German nationalisms in later centuries would claim succession from Charlemagne and the original kingdom, but nowadays both have become seen by many as pan-European symbols.

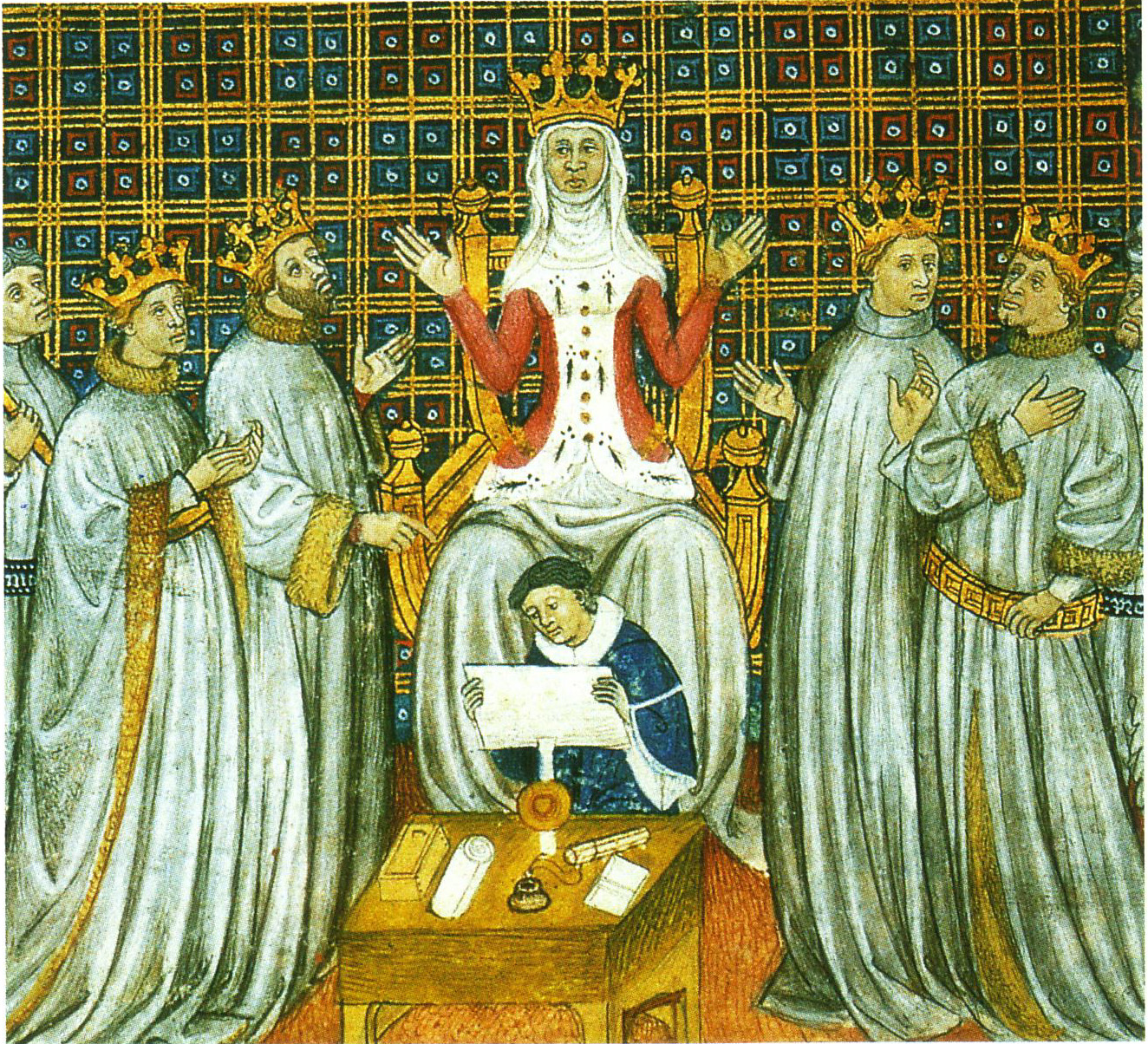
The partition of the Frankish kingdom among the four sons of Clovis with Clotilde presiding, Grandes Chroniques de France (Bibliothèque municipale de Toulouse)

== The Franks before Clovis ==
The term "Franks" emerged in the 3rd century AD as a term for several Germanic tribes including the Bructeri, Chamavi, and Chattuarii, who had long lived near the Rhine, just outside the Roman Empire. During the Crisis of the Third Century, while the empire was weakened by internal turmoil, the Franks were able to cross the Rhine, raiding into Roman Gaul and settling in the Rhine delta. In the late 3rd century the so-called Tetrarchy emperors were eventually able to reassert Roman authority over their Rhine frontier, and their hegemony over the Frankish tribes, but they also effectively gave up the Rhine delta and regions near it as an area for normal taxation and governance, and population and agricultural activity decreased dramatically. In the 4th century Franks re-entered the delta region and continued to make incursions into the empire. The emperor Julian the Apostate campaigned against various Frankish groups and renegotiated some of their agreements with the empire. He allowed the Salian Franks to settle not only in the delta, but also further south in Texandria in what is now the Netherlands. He also created new military units based on recruitment among the Frankish tribes. Under emperor Valentinian I Frankish people reached high military positions. Some of the Frankish elite were then closely intertwined with the Roman military and political system. The Frankish presence in northern Gaul, and within the Roman military, increased and when a large-scale invasion of Gaul was made in 406 it was the Frankish forces who defended the Rhine, killing Godigisel the king of the Hasdingi Vandals.

After the Franks were established in Germania Inferior under several kings, one of them named Chlodio launched an attack on territory which was still inhabited by Romans, south of the "Silva Carbonaria" or "Charcoal forest", which was south of modern Brussels. He conquered Tournai, Artois, Cambrai, and probably reached as far as the Somme river, in the Roman province of Belgica Secunda in what is now northern France. Chlodio is believed to be the ancestor of the future Merovingian dynasty. Other Franks took control of the important Roman cities of Cologne and Trier.

In 451 various groups of Franks were on both sides when the Roman general Aetius fought against the Huns at the Battle of the Catalaunian Plains, near Troyes.

Childeric I, the father of Clovis, was possibly a relative of Chlodio. He acted as a Roman general, ruling as king over Frankish forces in northern Gaul, and he was also perhaps governor of the province of Belgica Secunda.

== Birth of the Frankish kingdom with Clovis ==
The Frankish kingdoms at the death of Clovis in 511

Clovis I unified the Frankish kingdoms in 481 by executing the other Salian or Ripuarian Frankish kings, his relatives: King Ragnachar (Cambrai) and his brothers Richaire and Rigomer, King Chararic, King Chlodoric.

Having unified the Salian and Rhenish Frankish kingdoms, Clovis I, with the support of the clergy and the great Gallo-Roman families, unified Gaul by destroying the other Germanic kingdoms whose kings, of the Arian faith, hardly enjoyed the trust of predominantly Catholic populations.

In 486, he seized the cities of Senlis, Beauvais, Soissons, and Paris. His victory in the Franco-Roman War against Syagrius, considered "king of the Romans", who controlled a Gallo-Roman enclave between the Meuse and the Loire regarded as the last fragment of the Western Roman Empire, allowed Clovis to control all of northern Gaul.

== Unity of the Frankish kingdom despite partitions ==
The kingdom of the Franks founded by Clovis was later often divided into sub-kingdoms, called "parts of the kingdom" or "separate states", following the Frankish custom of equitable partition of the kingdom among the sovereign's sons. Periods of monarchical unity are therefore rather exceptional. However, the unity of these different sub-kingdoms was always recognized, despite sometimes violent conflicts. Several facts bear witness to this unity:

The sense of belonging to a common and higher entity, the kingdom of the Franks, covering most of Gaul and united by allegiance to the same royal dynasty, remained strong among the Franks and sustained the sense of Frankish unity. Moreover, as early as the second half of the 6th century, the inhabitants of northern Gaul recognized themselves as Franks, testifying to the accomplishment of the gradual fusion between Gallo-Romans and Franks, which would be completed in the 7th century, as well as to the birth, in the words of Ferdinand Lot, of a Gallo-Frankish patriotism.

These kingdoms also knew how to set aside their internal conflicts in order to unite against other kingdoms, such as during the assaults of the Frankish kings against the Burgundians.

Despite the partitions of the unified kingdom by Clovis I, all his descendants reigning over portions of Frankish territory bore the title of King of the Franks, thereby expressing their awareness of the unity and special identity of the Frankish kingdom.

This unity of the Frankish kingdom was also manifested by the indivisible character of Paris, the seat of the kingdom by the will of Clovis I, and later by the proximity of the different capitals in the Paris Basin.

However, this idea of a unified Frankish kingdom despite the partition of territories among the Merovingians is not shared by all historians. Some favor instead the idea of a “Frankish duality,” that is, the division of former Roman Gaul into two competing entities, which some monarchs attempted unsuccessfully to unify: the Salian/Neustrian kingdom and the Rhenish/Austrasian kingdom.

== Merovingian period ==
=== Clovis I (481–511) ===
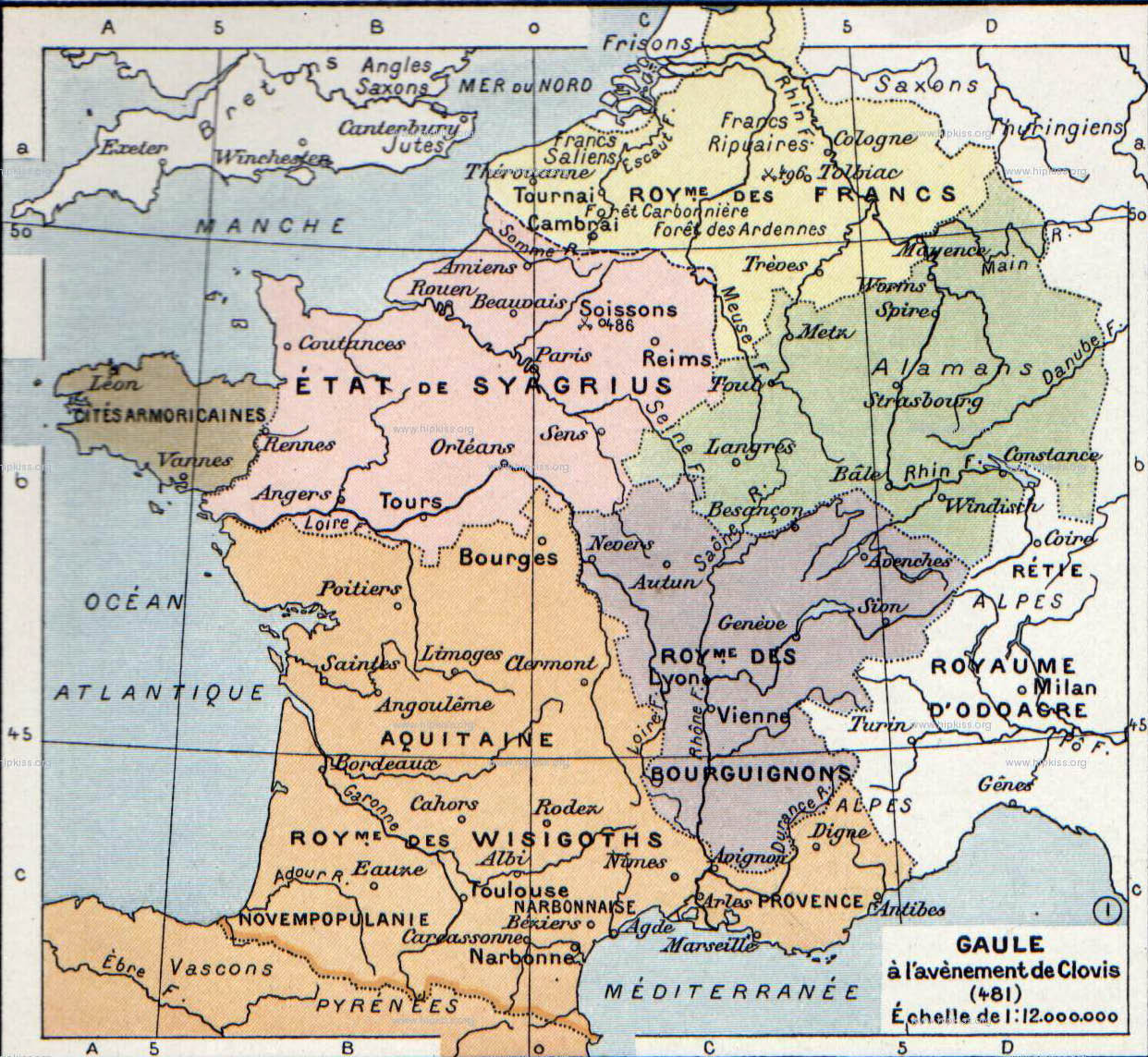
The political divisions of Gaul at the inception of Clovis's career (481). Note that only the Burgundian kingdom and the province of Septimania remained unconquered at his death (511).

Chlodio's successors are obscure figures, but what can be certain is that Childeric I, possibly his grandson, ruled a Salian kingdom from Tournai as a foederatus of the Romans. Childeric is chiefly important to history for bequeathing the Franks to his son Clovis, who began an effort to extend his authority over the other Frankish tribes and to expand their territorium south and west into Gaul. Clovis converted to Christianity and put himself on good terms with the powerful Church and with his Gallo-Roman subjects.

During his 30-year reign Clovis defeated Syagrius in the Franco-Roman War and conquered the Kingdom of Soissons. He defeated the Alemanni at the Battle of Tolbiac in 496 and established Frankish hegemony over them. Clovis defeated the Visigoths at the Battle of Vouillé in 507 and conquered all their territory north of the Pyrenees save Septimania, and he conquered the Bretons (according to Gregory of Tours) and made them vassals of the Franks. He also incorporated the various Roman military settlements (laeti) scattered over Gaul: the Saxons of Bessin; the Britons and the Alans of Armorica and the Loire Valley; and the Taifals of Poitou to name a few. By the end of his life, Clovis ruled all of Gaul save the Gothic province of Septimania and the Burgundian kingdom in the southeast.

The date on which Clovis became "king of all Franks" is not known, but it happened sometime after the Battle of Vouillé. In 508 Clovis made Paris his capital, and on Christmas Day 508 he converted to Catholicism, and some time later he orchestrated the murders of Frankish kings Sigobert and Ragnachar, uniting all Franks under his rule. The sole source for this early period is Gregory of Tours, who wrote around the year 590. His chronology for the reigns of the early kings is almost certainly fabricated, often contradicting itself and other sources. Clovis' baptism, traditionally dated to 496, is now believed to have taken place in 508.

The Merovingians were a hereditary monarchy. The Frankish kings adhered to the practice of partible inheritance, dividing their lands among their sons. Even when multiple Merovingian kings ruled, the kingdom—not unlike the late Roman Empire—was conceived of as a single realm ruled collectively by several kings, and a turn of events could result in the reunification of the whole realm under a single king. The Merovingian kings ruled by divine right, and their kingship was symbolised by their long hair and initially by their acclamation, which was carried out by raising the king on a shield in accordance with the ancient Germanic practice of electing a war-leader at an assembly of the warriors.

=== Clovis' successors (511–561) ===
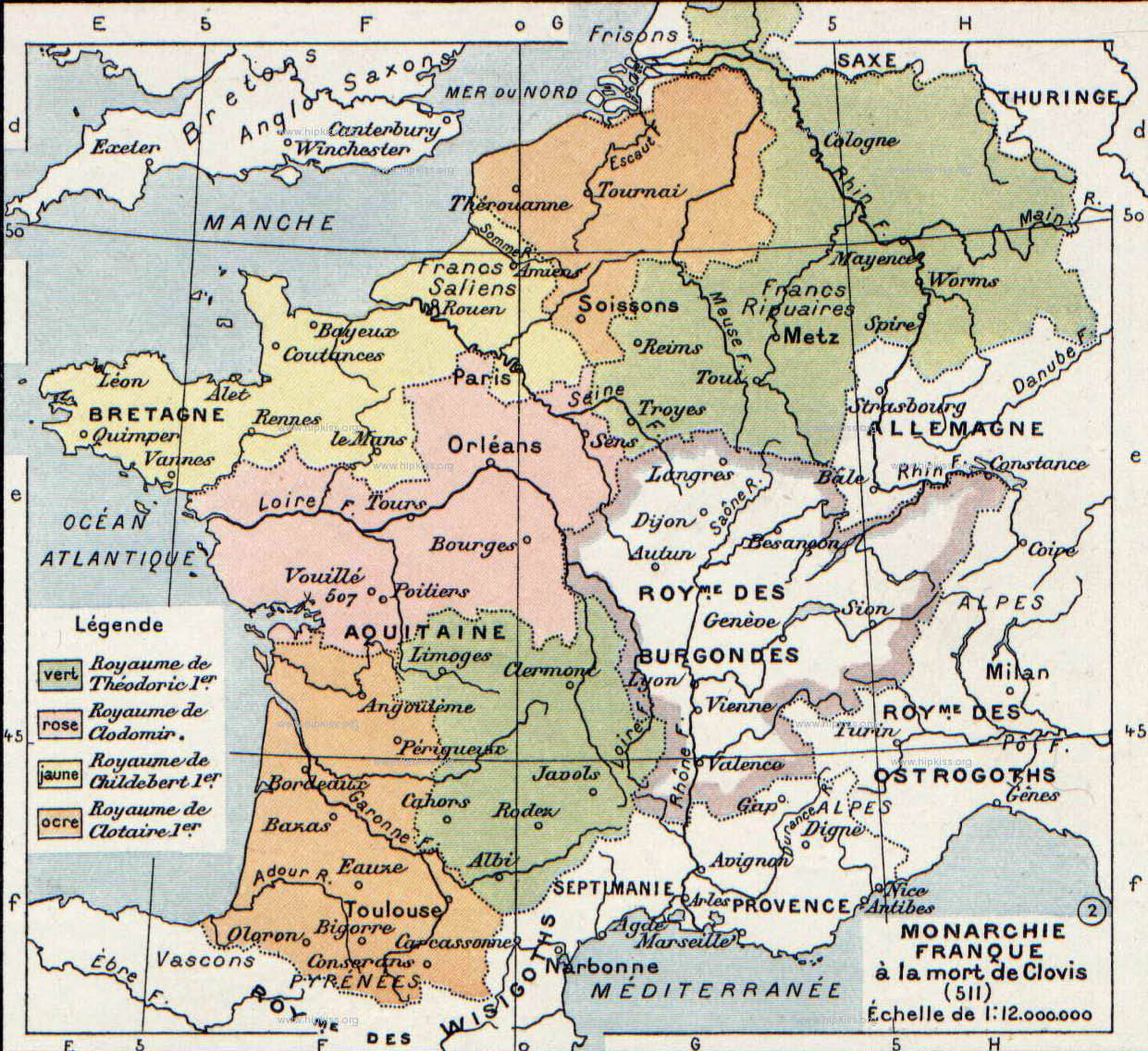
The division of the Frankish kingdom on Clovis's death (511). The kingdoms were not geographic unities because they were formed in an attempt to create equal-sized fiscs. The discrepancy in size reveals the concentration of Roman fiscal lands.

At the death of Clovis, his kingdom was divided territorially by his four adult sons in such a way that each son was granted a comparable portion of fiscal land, which was probably land once part of the Roman fisc which had been seized by the Frankish government. Clovis's sons made their capitals near the Frankish heartland in northeastern Gaul. Theuderic I made his capital at Reims; Chlodomer at Orléans; Childebert I at Paris; and Chlothar I at Soissons. During their reigns, the Thuringii (532), Burgundes (534), and Saxons and Frisians (c. 560) were incorporated into the Frankish kingdom. The outlying trans-Rheine tribes were loosely attached to Frankish sovereignty, and though they could be forced to contribute to Frankish military efforts, in times of weak kings they were uncontrollable and liable to attempt independence. The Romanised Burgundian kingdom, however, was preserved in its territoriality by the Franks and converted into one of their primary divisions, incorporating the central Gallic heartland of Chlodomer's realm with its capital at Orléans.

The fraternal kings showed only intermittent signs of friendship and were often in rivalry. On the death of Chlodomer in 524, Chlothar had Chlodomer's sons murdered in order to take a share of his kingdom, which was, in accordance with custom, divided between the surviving brothers. Theuderic died in 534, but his adult son Theudebert I was capable of defending his inheritance, which formed the largest of the Frankish subkingdoms.

Theudebert was the first Frankish king to formally sever his ties to the Roman emperor in Constantinople by striking gold coins with his own image on them and calling himself magnus rex (great king) because of his supposed suzerainty over peoples as far away as Pannonia. Theudebert interfered in the Gothic War on the side of the Gepids and Lombards against the Ostrogoths, receiving the provinces of Raetia, Noricum, and part of Veneto as spoils. His son and successor Theudebald was unable to retain them, and on Theudebald's death in 555 all the lands passed to Chlothar. With the death of Childebert in 558, the entire Frankish realm was reunited under the rule of Clothar.

=== Chlothar's successors (561–592) ===
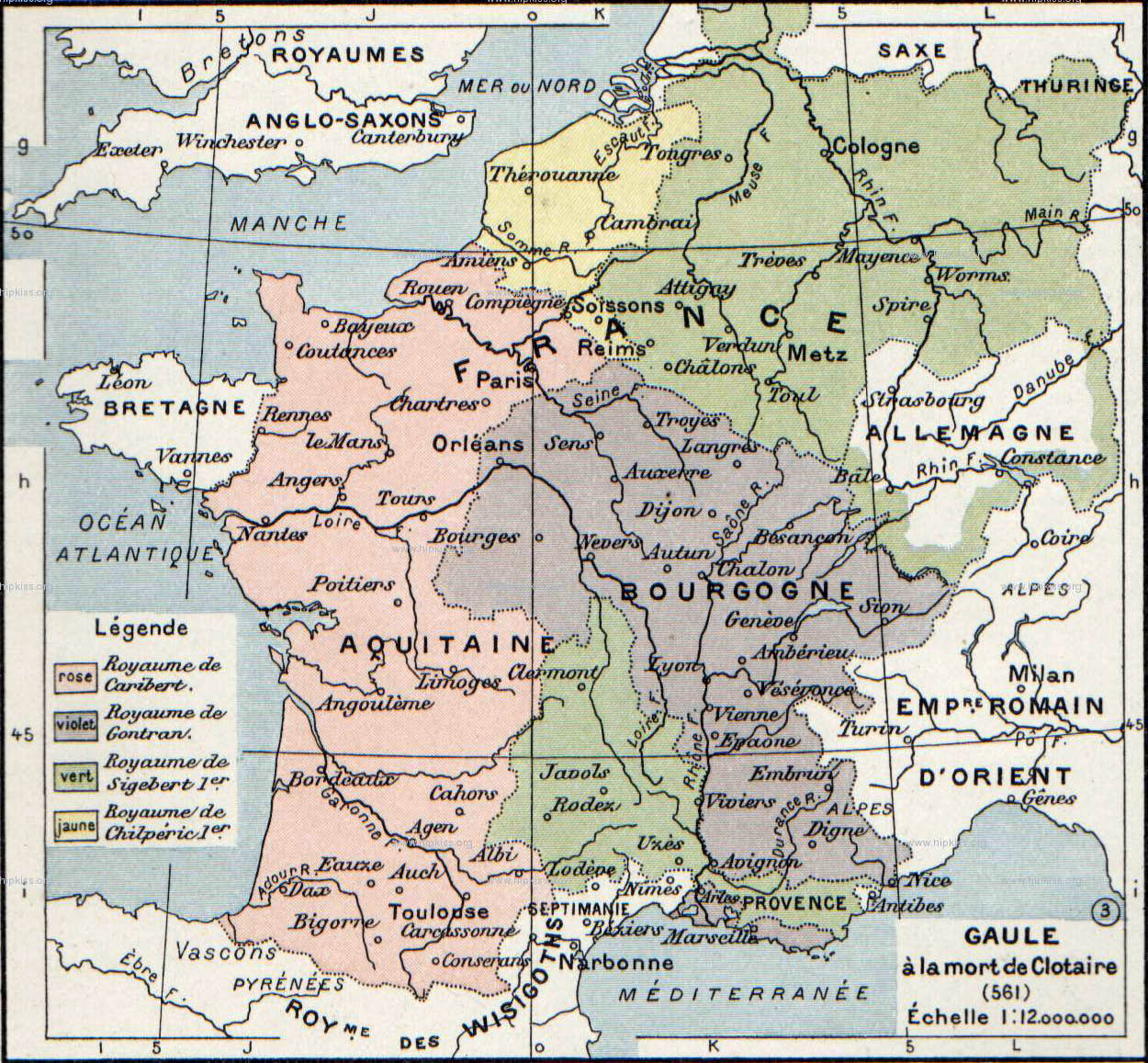
The division of Gaul on Chlothar I's death (561). Though more geographically unified realms were created out of the second fourfold division, the complex division of Provence created many problems for the rulers of Burgundy and Austrasia.

In 561 Chlothar died, and his realm was divided between his four sons in a replay of the events of 50 years prior, with the chief cities remaining the same. The eldest son Charibert I inherited the kingdom with its capital at Paris and ruled western Gaul. Guntram inherited the old kingdom of the Burgundians, augmented by the lands of central France around Orléans, which became his chief city, and most of Provence. The rest of Provence, the Auvergne, and eastern Aquitaine were assigned to Sigebert I, who also inherited Austrasia with its chief cities of Reims and Metz. The smallest kingdom was Soissons, which went to the youngest son, Chilperic I.

The divided kingdom was quickly ruined by fratricidal wars, waged largely over the 568 murder of Galswintha, the wife of Chilperic, allegedly by his mistress (and second wife) Fredegund. Brunhilda, Galswintha's sister and wife of Sigebert, incited her husband to war, and the conflict between the two queens continued to plague relations until the next century. Guntram sought to keep the peace, though he also attempted twice (585 and 589) to conquer Septimania from the Goths, but he was defeated both times.

All the surviving brothers benefited at the death of Charibert in 567, but Chilperic was also able to extend his authority during the period of war by bringing the Bretons to heel again. After Chilperic's death in 584, Guntram had to again force the Bretons to submit. In 587, the Treaty of Andelot—the text of which explicitly refers to the entire Frankish realm as Francia—between Brunhilda and Guntram secured his protection of her young son Childebert II, who had succeeded Sigebert when he was assassinated in 575. Together the territory of Guntram and Childebert was well over three times the size of the realm of Chilperic's successor, Chlothar II.

=== Split into Neustria, Austrasia, and Burgundy (592–614) ===
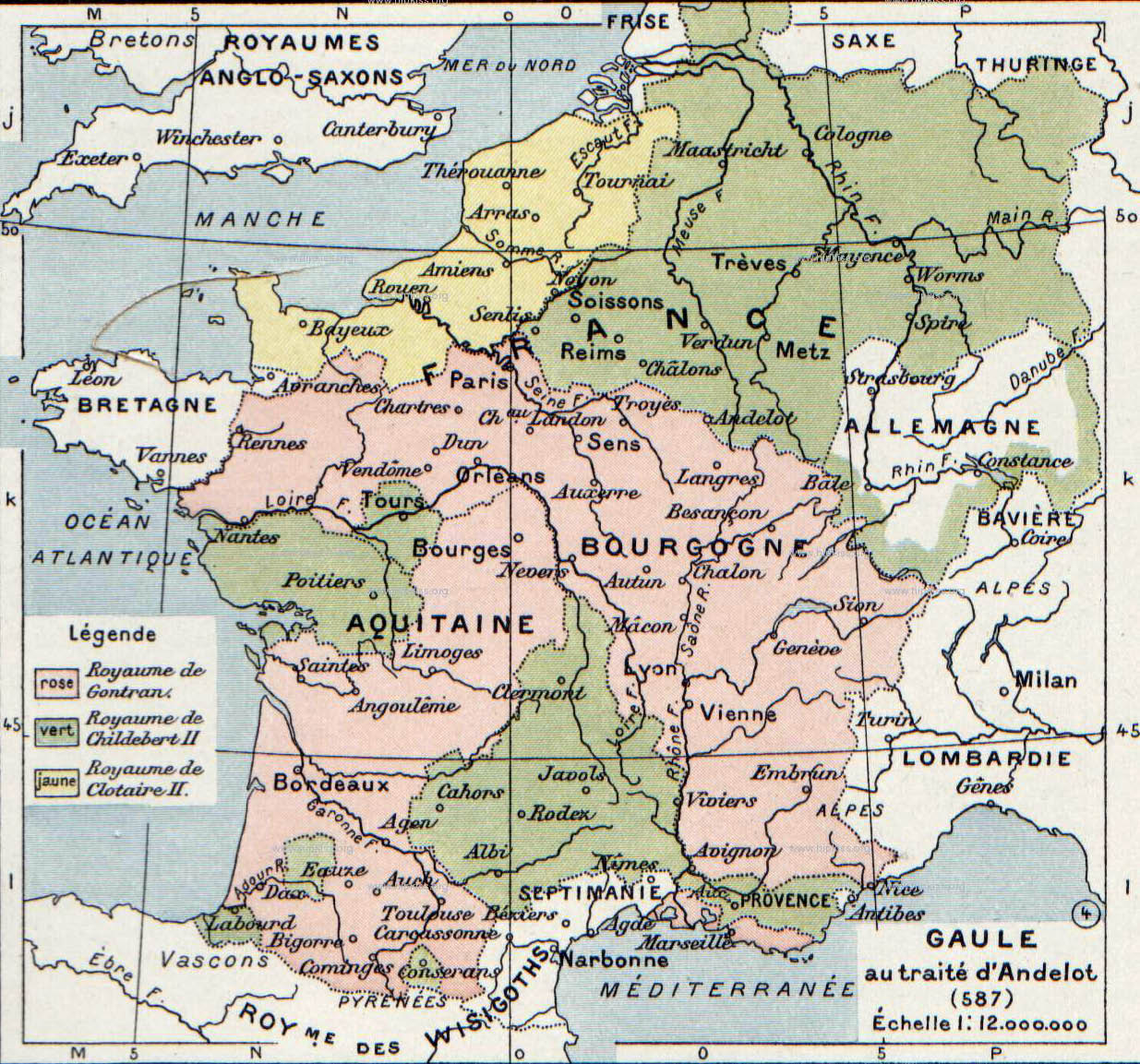
Gaul as a result of the Treaty of Andelot (587). The treaty followed the division of Charibert I's kingdom between the three surviving brothers. It gave Guntram's portion with Poitou and Touraine to Childebert II in exchange for extensive lands in southern and central Aquitaine.

When Guntram died in 592, Burgundy went to Childebert in its entirety, but he died in 595. His two sons divided the kingdom, with Theudebert II taking Austrasia plus Childebert's portion of Aquitaine, while Theuderic II inherited Burgundy and Guntram's portion of Aquitaine. United, the brothers sought to remove Chlothar II from power, conquering most of his kingdom and reducing him to only a few cities, but they failed to capture him. In 599 they routed his forces at Dormelles and seized the Dentelin region.

During their reigns, Theudebert and Theuderic campaigned successfully in Gascony, where they had established the Duchy of Gascony and brought the Basques to submission in 602. This original Gascon conquest included lands south of the Pyrenees, namely Biscay and Gipuzkoa, but these were lost to the Visigoths in 612. On the opposite end of his realm, the Alemanni had defeated Theuderic in a rebellion, and the Franks were losing their hold on the trans-Rheine tribes.

Theudebert and Theuderic began infighting, often incited by Brunhilda who, angered over her expulsion from Theudebert's court, convinced Theuderic to unseat him. In 610 Theudebert extorted the Duchy of Alsace. In 612 Theuderic killed Theudebert, and the entire realm was again ruled by one man. This was short-lived, however, as he died on the eve of preparing an expedition against Chlothar in 613, leaving his illegitimate son Sigebert II as inheritor of the kingdoms of Burgundy and Austrasia in 613.

During the brief reign of Sigebert II, the office of the mayor of the palace, which had for some time been visible in the kingdoms of the Franks, came to the fore in its internal politics, with a faction of nobles coalescing around Warnachar II, Rado, and Pepin of Landen, to give the kingdom over to Chlothar in order to remove Brunhilda, the young king's regent, from power. Warnachar was already the mayor of the palace of Austrasia, while Rado and Pepin were rewarded with mayoral offices after Chlothar's coup succeeded and Brunhilda and the ten-year-old king were killed.

=== Chlothar II (614–631) ===
In 614 Chlothar II promulgated the Edict of Paris which has generally been viewed as a concession to the nobility, though this view has come under recent criticism. The purpose of the edict was primarily to guarantee justice and end corruption in government, but it also entrenched the regional differences between the three kingdoms of Francia and probably granted the nobles more control over judicial appointments.

By 623 the Austrasians had begun to clamour for a king of their own, since Chlothar was so often absent from the kingdom and, because of his upbringing and previous rule in the Seine basin, was more or less an outsider there. Chlothar thus granted that his son Dagobert I would be their king, and he was duly acclaimed by the Austrasian warriors. Nonetheless, though Dagobert exercised authority in his realm, Chlothar maintained ultimate control over the whole Frankish kingdom.

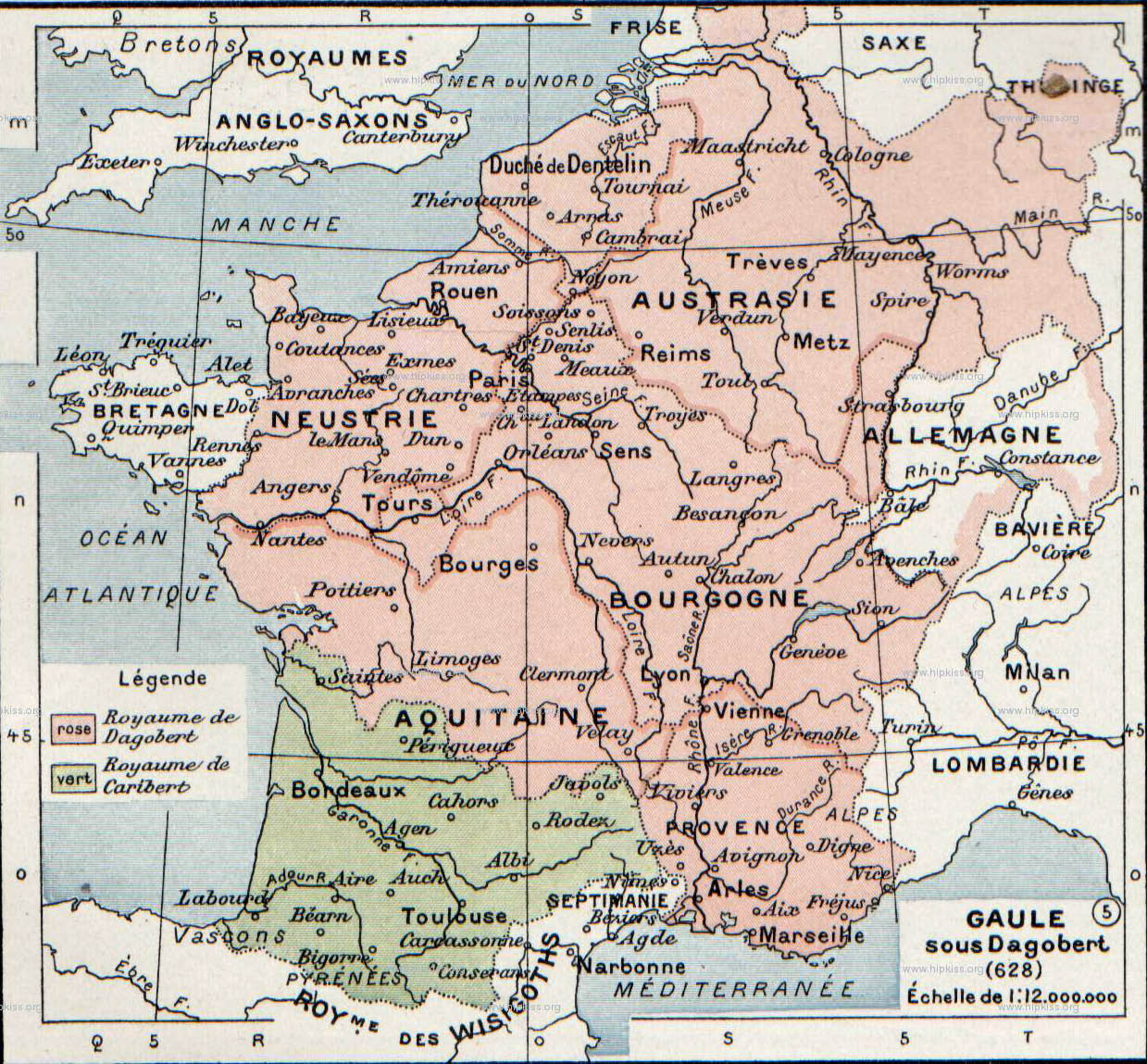
The Frankish Kingdom of Aquitaine (628). The capital of Aquitaine was Toulouse. It included Gascony and was the basis of the later Duchy of Aquitaine.

During the joint reign of Chlothar and Dagobert, who have been called "the last ruling Merovingians", the Saxons—who had been loosely attached to Francia since the 550s—rebelled under Berthoald, Duke of Saxony, and were defeated and reincorporated into the kingdom by the joint action of father and son. When Chlothar died in 628, Dagobert in accordance with his father's wishes granted a subkingdom to his younger brother Charibert II. This subkingdom, commonly called Aquitaine, was a new creation.

=== Dagobert I and successors (631–687) ===
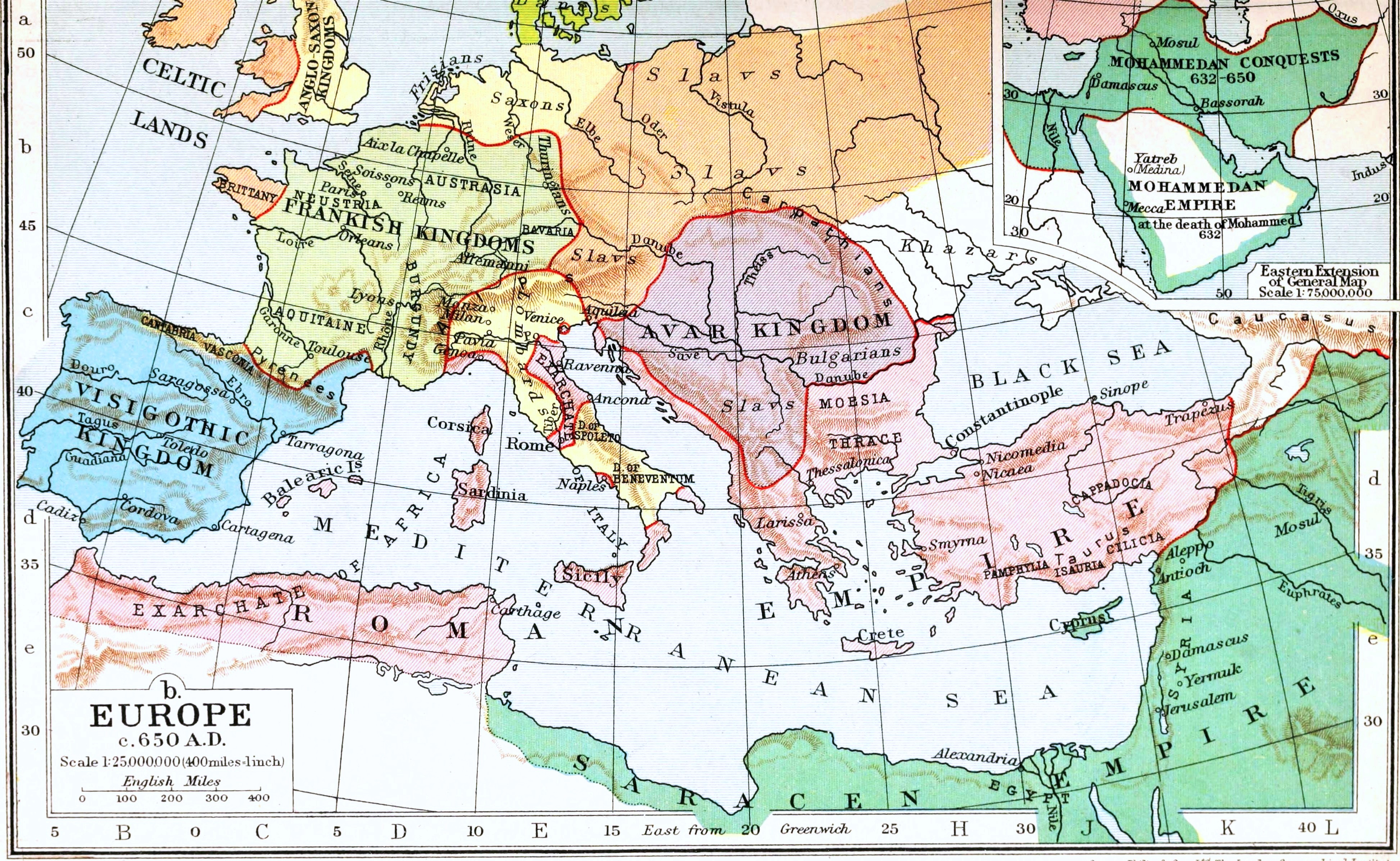
Francia and neighbouring Slavic peoples c. 650

In 631 Dagobert tried to force tribute of the Slavs, but he was defeated by King Samo at the Battle of Wogastisburg. Dagobert made the Saxons, Alemans, and Thuringii, as well as the Slavs beyond the borders of Francia subject to the court of Neustria and not of Austrasia. This incited the Austrasians to request a king of their own from the royal household.

The subkingdom of Aquitaine corresponded to the southern half of the old Roman province of Aquitania, and its capital was at Toulouse. The other cities of his kingdom were Cahors, Agen, Périgueux, Bordeaux, and Saintes; the Duchy of Vasconia was also part of his allotment.

Charibert campaigned successfully against the Basques, but after his death in 632 they revolted again (632). At the same time the Bretons rose up against Frankish suzerainty. In 635 Dagobert subdued the Basques, while threats of military action induced the Breton leader Judicael to relent, make peace with the Franks, and pay tribute.

In 632 Dagobert had Charibert's infant successor Chilperic assassinated and reunited the entire Frankish realm, though he was forced by the strong Austrasian aristocracy to grant his son Sigebert III to them as a sub-king in 633. This act was precipitated largely by the Austrasians' desire to be self-governing at a time when Neustrians dominated at the royal court. Chlothar had been the king at Paris for decades before becoming the king at Metz as well, and the Merovingian monarchy was ever after him to be a Neustrian monarchy first and foremost. Indeed, it is in the 640s that "Neustria" first appears in writing, its late appearance relative to "Austrasia" probably because Neustrians (who formed the bulk of the authors of the time) called their region simply "Francia". Burgundia also defined itself in opposition to Neustria at about this time; however, it was the Austrasians who had been seen as a distinct people within the realm since the time of Gregory of Tours, who were to make the most strident moves for independence.

Sigebert was dominated during his minority by Mayor of the Palace Grimoald the Elder, who convinced the childless king to adopt his own Merovingian-named son Childebert as his son and heir. After Dagobert's death in 639 Radulf, Duke of Thuringia, rebelled and tried to make himself king. In 640 he defeated Sigebert in what was a serious reversal for the ruling dynasty. Sigebert lost the support of many magnates while on campaign, and the weakness of the monarchic institutions by that time are evident in his inability to effectively make war without the support of the magnates; in fact, he could not even provide his own bodyguard without the loyal aid of mayors of the palace Grimoald and Adalgisel. Sigebert is often regarded as the first roi fainéant: "do-nothing king".

Clovis II, Dagobert's successor in Neustria and Burgundy, which were thereafter attached yet ruled separately, was a minor for almost the whole of his reign. He was dominated by his mother Nanthild and Mayor of the Palace Erchinoald. Erchinoald's successor Ebroin dominated the kingdom for the next 15 years of near-constant civil war. On his death in 656 Sigbert's son was shipped off to Ireland, while Grimoald's son Childebert reigned in Austrasia. Ebroin eventually reunited the entire Frankish kingdom for Clovis's successor Chlothar III by killing Grimoald and removing Childebert in 661. However, the Austrasians demanded a king of their own again, and Chlothar installed his younger brother Childeric II. During Chlothar's reign, the Franks had made an attack on northwestern Italy, but were driven off by Grimoald, King of the Lombards, near Rivoli.

In 673 Chlothar III died, and some Neustrian and Burgundian magnates invited Childeric to become king of the whole realm, but he upset some Neustrian magnates and was assassinated n 675. The reign of Theuderic III was to prove the end of the Merovingian dynasty's power. Theuderic III succeeded his brother Chlothar III in Neustria in 673, but Childeric II of Austrasia displaced him soon thereafter—until he died in 675, and Theuderic III retook his throne. When Dagobert II died in 679, Theuderic received Austrasia as well and became king of the whole Frankish realm.

=== Mayors of the palace (687–751) ===
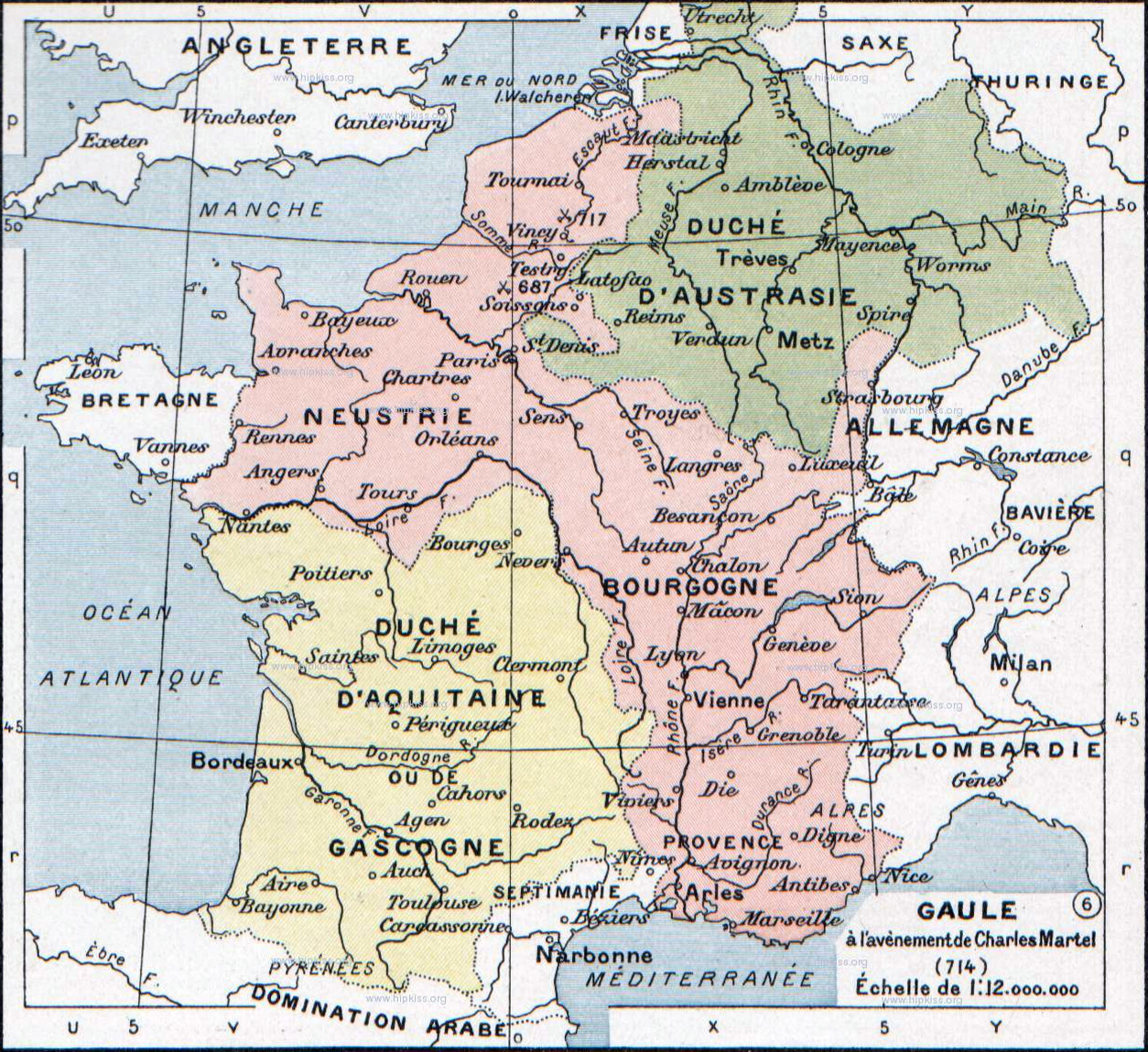
Gaul at the death of Pepin of Heristal (714). At this time the vast duchy of Aquitaine (yellow) was not a part of the Frankish kingdom.

In 687 Theuderic III was defeated by Pepin of Herstal, the Arnulfing mayor of Austrasia and the real power in that kingdom, at the Battle of Tertry and was forced to accept Pepin as sole mayor and dux et princeps Francorum: "Duke and Prince of the Franks", a title which signified the beginning of Pepin's reign according to Liber Historiae Francorum. Thereafter the Merovingian monarchs showed only sporadically in the surviving records, and any activities were of a non-symbolic and self-willed nature.

During the period of confusion in the 670s and 680s, attempts had been made to re-assert Frankish suzerainty over the Frisians but to no avail. In 689 Pepin launched a campaign of conquest in West Frisia and defeated King Radbod near Dorestad, an important trading centre. All the land between the Scheldt and the Vlie was incorporated into Francia. Then, circa 690, Pepin attacked central Frisia and took Utrecht. In 695 Pepin could even sponsor the foundation of the Archdiocese of Utrecht and the beginning of the conversion of the Frisians under Willibrord. However, East Frisia remained outside of Frankish suzerainty.

Having achieved great successes against the Frisians, Pepin turned towards the Alemanni. In 709 he launched a war against Willehari, duke of the Ortenau, probably in an effort to force the succession of the young sons of the deceased Gotfrid on the ducal throne. This outside interference led to another war in 712, and the Alemanni were for the time being subject to Francia. However, in southern Gaul, which was not under Arnulfing influence, the regions were pulling away from the royal court under leaders such as Savaric of Auxerre, Antenor of Provence, and Odo of Aquitaine. The reigns of Clovis IV and Childebert III from 691 until 711 have all the hallmarks of those of rois fainéants, though Childebert made some royal judgements against of the Arnulfings.

=== Charles Martel (714–751) ===
Pepin died suddenly in 714. Just before Pepin's death, his consort Plectrude convinced him to disinherit the sons he had with his mistress Alpaida in favour of his grandson Theudoald (the son of Pepin and Plectrude's son Grimoald), who was still a young child (and amenable to Plectrude's control). His grandchildren through Plectrude claimed themselves to be Pepin's true successors and, with the help of Plectrude, tried to maintain the position of mayor of the palace after Pepin's death. However, Charles Martel (son of Pepin and Alpaida) had gained favour among the Austrasians, primarily for his military prowess and ability to keep them well supplied with booty from his conquests. Despite the efforts of Plectrude to silence her child's rival by imprisoning him, Charles became the sole mayor of the palace—and de facto ruler of Francia—after a civil war which lasted for more than three years.

In 717 Charles installed Chlothar IV in opposition to King Chilperic II, whose rule was thereby restricted to Neustria. This marked the first time since 679 that the kingdom was divided. Following Chlothar's death in 718, the kingdom was reunited under Chilperic II. In 718 at the Battle of Soissons, Charles defeated his rivals and forced them into hiding. There were no more active Merovingian kings after that point, and Charles and his Carolingian heirs ruled the Franks.

After 718 Charles embarked on a series of wars intended to strengthen the Franks' hegemony in western Europe. In 718 he defeated the rebellious Saxons, in 719 he overran West Frisia, in 723 he suppressed the Saxons again, and in 724 he defeated Ragenfrid and the rebellious Neustrians, ending the civil war phase of his rule. In 720 Chilperic II died, and Theuderic IV was appointed king, but he was a puppet king. In 724 Charles forced his choice of Hugbert for the ducal succession upon the Bavarians and forced the Alemanni to assist him in his campaigns in Bavaria (725 and 726), where laws were promulgated in Theuderic IV's name. In 730 Alemannia was subjugated, and Duke Lantfrid was killed. In 734 Charles fought against East Frisia and finally subdued it.

In the 730s the Umayyad conquerors of Spain, who had also subjugated Septimania, began advancing northwards into central Francia and the Loire Valley. Around 736 Duke Maurontus of Provence called in the Umayyads to aid him in resisting the expanding influence of the Carolingians. However, Charles invaded the Rhône Valley with his brother Childebrand and a Lombard army and devastated the region. It was because of the alliance against the Arabs that Charles was unable to support Pope Gregory III against the Lombards.

In 732 or 737—modern scholars have debated over the date—Charles marched against an Arab army between Poitiers and Tours and defeated it in a watershed battle that turned back the tide of the Arab advance north of the Pyrenees. But Charles' real interests lay in the northeast, primarily with the Saxons, from whom he had to extort the tribute which for centuries they had paid to the Merovingians.

Shortly before his death in October 741, Charles divided the realm as if he were king between his two sons by his first wife, marginalising his younger son Grifo, who did receive a small portion (it is unknown exactly what). Though there had been no king since Theuderic's death in 737, Charles's sons Pepin the Short and Carloman were still only mayors of the palaces. The Carolingians had assumed the regal status and practice, though not the regal title, of the Merovingians. The division of the kingdom gave Austrasia, Alemannia, and Thuringia to Carloman; and Neustria, Provence, and Burgundy to Pepin. It is indicative of the de facto autonomy of the duchies of Aquitaine (under Hunoald) and Bavaria (under Odilo) that they were not included in the division of the regnum.

After Charles Martel was buried in the Abbey of Saint-Denis alongside the Merovingian kings, conflict immediately erupted between Pepin and Carloman on one side and Grifo on the other. Though Carloman captured and imprisoned Grifo, it may have been enmity between the elder brothers that caused Pepin to release Grifo while Carloman was on a pilgrimage to Rome. Perhaps in an effort to neutralise his brother's ambitions, Carloman initiated the appointment of a new king, Childeric III, drawn from a monastery, in 743. Others have suggested that perhaps the position of the two brothers was weak or challenged, or perhaps there Carloman was merely acting for a loyalist or legitimist party in the kingdom.

In 743 Pepin campaigned against Odilo and forced him to submit to Frankish suzerainty; Carloman campaigned against the Saxons; and the two together defeated a rebellion led by Hunoald at the head of the Basques and another led by Alemanni. In 746, however, the Frankish armies were still, as Carloman was preparing to retire from politics and enter the monastery of Monte Soratte. Pepin's position was further stabilised and the path was laid for his assumption of the crown in 751.

== Carolingian period ==
=== Pepin the Short (751–768) ===
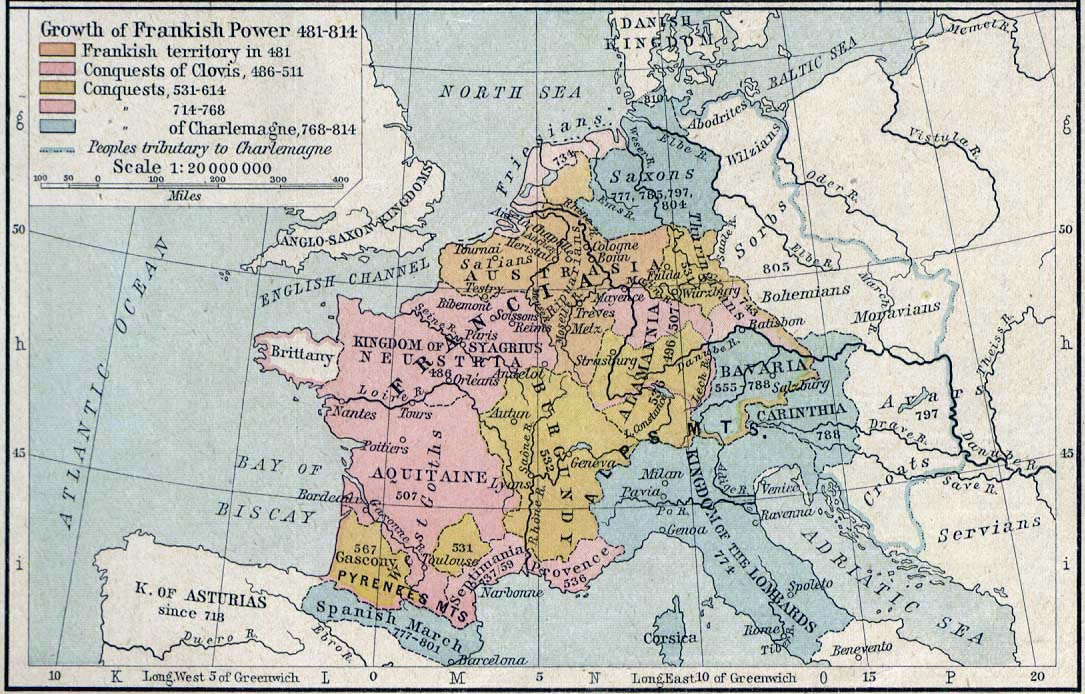
The growth of Frankish power, 481–814, showing Francia as it originally was after the crumbling of the Western Roman Empire. It was located northeasterly of that during the time of Constantine the Great.

Frankish expansion from the early kingdom of Clovis I (481) to the divisions of Charlemagne's Empire (843/870)

Pepin reigned as an elected king. Although such elections happened infrequently, a general rule in Germanic law stated that the king relied on the support of his leading men. These men reserved the right to choose a new "kingworthy" leader out of the ruling clan if they felt that the old one could not lead them in profitable battle. While in later France the kingdom became hereditary, the kings of the later Holy Roman Empire proved unable to abolish the elective tradition and continued as elected rulers until the empire's formal end in 1806.

Pepin solidified his position in 754 by entering into an alliance with Pope Stephen II, who presented the king of the Franks a copy of the forged "Donation of Constantine" at Paris, and in a magnificent ceremony at Saint-Denis Stephen anointed the king and his family and declared him patricius Romanorum ("protector of the Romans"). The following year Pepin fulfilled his promise to the pope and returned the Exarchate of Ravenna to the papacy, which had recently fallen to the Lombards. Pepin donated the conquered areas around Rome to the pope, laying the foundation for the Papal States in the "Donation of Pepin" which he laid on Saint Peter's tomb. The papacy had good cause to expect that the remade Frankish monarchy would provide a deferential power base (potestas) in the creation of a new world order, centred on the pope.

Upon Pepin's death in 768, his sons Charles and Carloman once again divided the kingdom between themselves. However, Carloman withdrew to a monastery and died shortly thereafter, leaving sole rule to his brother, who would later become known as Charlemagne or Charles the Great, a powerful, intelligent, and modestly literate figure who became a legend for the later history of both France and Germany. Charlemagne restored an equal balance between emperor and pope.

=== Charlemagne (768–814) ===
From 772 to 804, Charles fought the Saxons to incorporate their realm into the Frankish kingdom. These campaigns expanded the practice of non-Roman Christian rulers undertaking the conversion of their neighbours by armed force; Frankish Catholic missionaries, along with others from Ireland and Anglo-Saxon England, had entered Saxon lands since the mid-8th century, resulting in increasing conflict with the Saxons, who resisted the missionary efforts and parallel military incursions. Charles's main Saxon opponent, Widukind, accepted baptism in 785 as part of a peace agreement, but other Saxon leaders continued to fight. Upon his victory in 787 at Verden, Charles ordered the wholesale killing of thousands of pagan Saxon prisoners. After several more uprisings, the Saxons suffered definitive defeat in 804. This expanded the Frankish kingdom eastwards as far as the Elbe river, something the Roman Empire had only attempted once, and at which it failed in the Battle of the Teutoburg Forest (9 AD). In order to more effectively Christianize the Saxons, Charles founded several bishoprics, among them Bremen, Münster, Paderborn, and Osnabrück.

Europe at the death of Charlemagne in 814

Charles conquered the Lombards and thus included northern Italy in his sphere of influence. He renewed the Vatican donation and the promise to the papacy of continued Frankish protection. In 788 Tassilo III, Duke of Bavaria, rebelled against Charles. Crushing the rebellion incorporated Bavaria into Charles's kingdom. This added to the royal fisc and drastically reduced the power and influence of the Agilolfings (Tassilo's family), another leading family among the Franks and potential rivals. Charles continued to expand the kingdom even farther southeast, into today's Austria and parts of Croatia. He thus created a realm that reached from the Pyrenees in the southwest including an area in northern Spain (Marca Hispanica), over almost all of France (except Brittany, which the Franks never conquered), eastwards to most Germany, including northern Italy and Austria. In the hierarchy of the church, bishops and abbots looked to the patronage of the king's palace, where the sources of patronage and security lay. Charles had fully emerged as the leader of Western Christendom, and his patronage of monastic centres of learning gave rise to the "Carolingian Renaissance" of literate culture. Charles also created a large palace at Aachen, as well as a series of roads and a canal.

On Christmas Day 800, Pope Leo III crowned Charles as "Emperor of the Romans" in Rome in a ceremony presented as a surprise (Charlemagne did not wish to be indebted to the bishop of Rome), a further papal move in the series of symbolic gestures that had been defining the mutual roles of papal auctoritas and imperial potestas. Though Charlemagne preferred the title "Emperor, king of the Franks and Lombards", the ceremony formally acknowledged the ruler of the Franks as the Roman Emperor, triggering disputes with the Byzantine Empire, which had maintained the title since the division of the Roman Empire into East and West. The pope's right to proclaim successors was based on the Donation of Constantine. After an initial protest at the usurpation, the Byzantine Emperor Michael I Rangabe acknowledged in 812 Charlemagne as co-emperor, according to some. According to others, Michael reopened negotiations with the Franks in 812 and recognized Charlemagne as basileus (emperor) but not as emperor of the Romans. The coronation gave permanent legitimacy to Carolingian primacy among the Franks.

=== Divided empire, after 840 ===
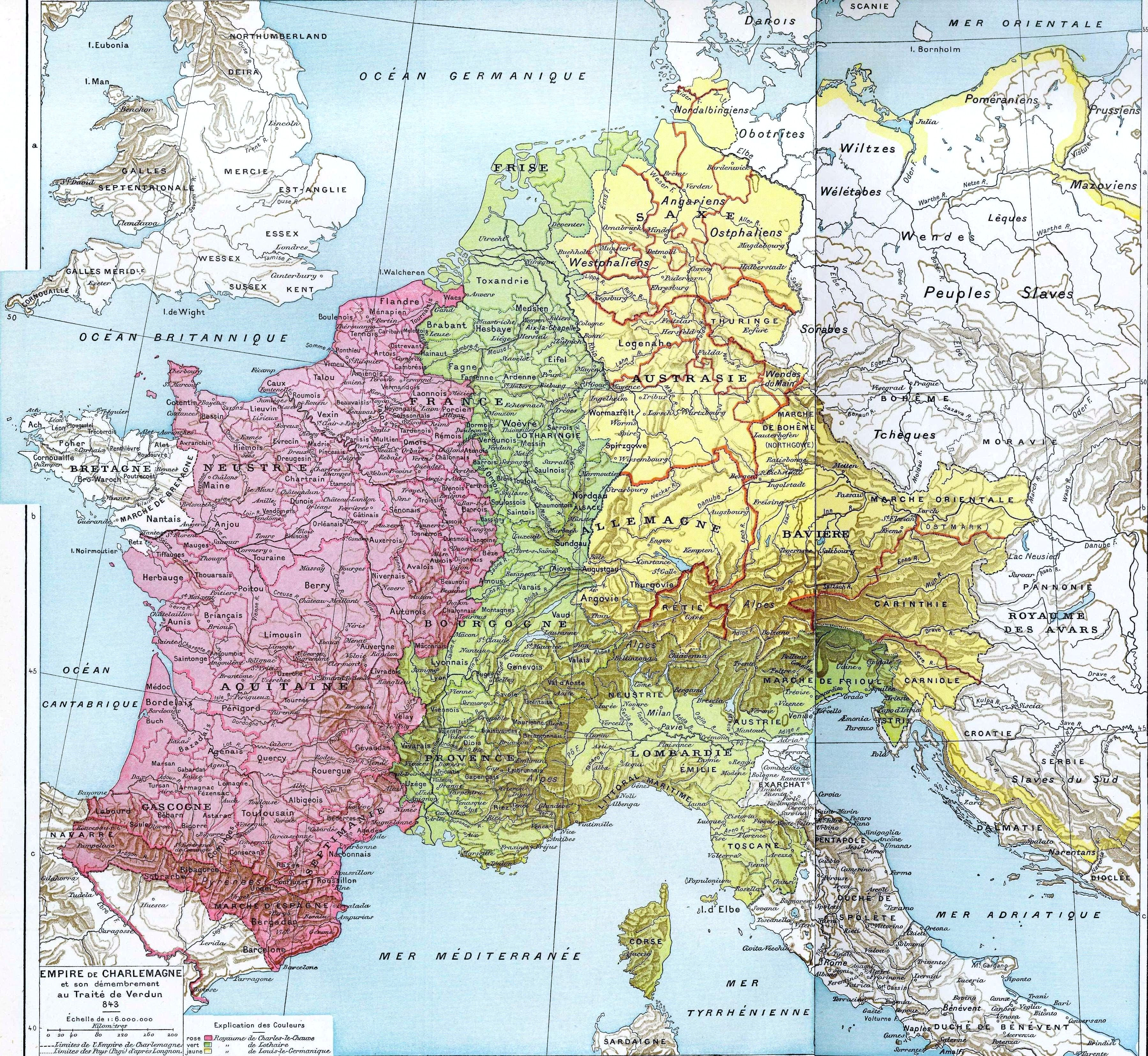
The Carolingian Empire at its greatest extent, with borders displaying the three territorial divisions of 843, from left to right: West Francia or the West Frankish Kingdom: Charles the Bald, King of the West Franks.; Middle Francia or the Middle Frankish Kingdom: Lothair I, King of the Middle Franks, nominally titled Emperor. This kingdom lasted only until 869.; East Francia or the East Frankish Kingdom: Louis the German, King of the East Franks.

Charlemagne died in 814. He had several sons, but only one survived him, Louis the Pious. Louis followed his father as the ruler of a united empire, but sole inheritance remained a matter of chance rather than intent. When Louis died in 840, the Carolingians adhered to the custom of partible inheritance, and after a brief civil war between the Louis' three sons, they made an agreement in 843, the Treaty of Verdun, which divided the empire into three parts. Lothair I became emperor in name but de facto only the ruler of the Middle Francia. His three sons in turn divided this kingdom between them into Lotharingia, Burgundy, and Lombardy. Louis the German became king of East Francia, and Charles the Bald ruled West Francia.

In 870 the Treaty of Meerssen partitioned Lotharingia. In 884 Charles the Fat (son of Louis the German) reunited most of the Carolingian Empire, aside from Burgundy. In 887 his nephew Arnulf of Carinthia revolted and assumed the title as King of the East Franks. Charles died on 13 January 888, and Odo, Count of Paris, was chosen to rule in the west. At this point, West Francia was composed of Neustria in the west and in the east by Francia proper, the region between the Meuse and the Seine. The Carolingians were restored ten years later in West Francia and ruled until 987, when the last Frankish King Louis V died.

West Francia was divided into the following great fiefs: Aquitaine, Brittany, Burgundy, Catalonia, Flanders, Gascony, Gothia, Paris & Blois, and Toulouse. Middle Francia was split on the death of Lothair II in 869 into those of Lotharingia, Provence (with Burgundy divided between it and Lotharingia), and north Italy. East Francia was divided into four duchies: Swabia (Alamannia), Franconia, Saxony and Bavaria; to which after the death of Lothair II were added the eastern parts of Lotharingia. Otto I was crowned in 962, marking the true beginning of the Holy Roman Empire.

== Culture ==
=== Law ===
The different Frankish tribes—such as the Salians, Ripuarii, and Chamavi—had different legal traditions which were only later codified, largely under Charlemagne. The Leges Salica, Ribuaria, and Chamavorum were Carolingian creations, their basis in earlier Frankish reality being difficult for scholars to discern at the present distance. Under Charlemagne codifications were also made of the Saxon law and the Frisian law.

It was also under Frankish hegemony that the other Germanic societies east of the Rhine began to codify their tribal law, in such compilations as the Lex Alamannorum and Lex Baiuvariorum for the Alemanni and Bavarii respectively. Throughout the Frankish kingdoms there continued to be Gallo-Romans subject to Roman law and clergy subject to canon law. After the Frankish conquest of Septimania and Catalonia, those regions which had formerly been under Gothic control continued to utilise the Visigothic law code.

During the early period, Frankish law was preserved by the rachimburgs, officials trained to remember it and pass it on. The Merovingians adopted the capitulary as a tool for the promulgation and preservation of royal ordinances. Its usage was to continue under the Carolingians and even the later Spoletan emperors Guy and Lambert under a programme of renovation regni Francorum ("renewal of the Frankish kingdom").

The last Merovingian capitulary was one of the most significant: the Edict of Paris issued by Chlothar II in 614 in the presence of his magnates had been likened to a Frankish Magna Carta entrenching the rights of the nobility, but in actuality it sought to remove corruption from the judiciary and protect local and regional interests. Even after the last Merovingian capitulary, kings of the dynasty continued to independently exercise some legal powers. Childebert III even found cases against the powerful Arnulfings and became renowned among the people for his justness. But law in Francia was to experience a renaissance under the Carolingians.

Among the legal reforms adopted by Charlemagne were the codifications of traditional law mentioned above. He also sought to place checks on the power of local and regional judiciaries by the method of appointing missi dominici in pairs to oversee specific regions for short periods of time. Usually missi were selected from outside their respective regions in order to prevent conflicts of interest. A capitulary of 802 gives insight into their duties. They were to execute justice, enforce respect for the royal rights, control the administration of the counts and dukes (who were royal appointees), receive the oath of allegiance, and supervise the clergy.

=== Church ===
The Frankish Church grew out of the Church in Gaul in the Merovingian period, which was given a particularly Germanic development in a number of "Frankish synods" throughout the 6th and 7th centuries. With the Carolingian Renaissance, the Frankish Church became a substantial influence of the medieval Western Church.

In the 7th century, the territory of the Frankish realm was (re-)Christianized with the help of Irish and Scottish missionaries. The result was the establishment of numerous monasteries, which would become the nucleus of Old High German literacy in the Carolingian Empire. Irish missionary Columbanus was active in Frankish lands from 590, establishing monasteries until his death at Bobbio in 615. He arrived on the continent with 12 companions and founded Annegray, Luxeuil, and Fontaines in France and Bobbio in Italy. During the 7th century. The disciples of Columbanus and other Scottish and Irish missionaries founded several monasteries or schottenklöster. The Irish influence in these monasteries is reflected in the adoption of Insular style in book production, visible in 8th-century works such as the Gelasian Sacramentary. The Insular influence on the uncial script of the later Merovingian period eventually gave way to the development of the Carolingian minuscule in the 9th century.

By the end of the 8th century, under the influence of some earlier Visigothic practices, various Church leaders in Francia developed an erroneous notion that the Filioque clause was an authentic part of the original Nicene Creed, and those views were further expanded by the Libri Carolini, thus provoking the Roman popes of that time (Hadrian I and Leo III) to intervene against the Filioque interpolation but with no result, and thus the interpolated Creed became common throughout the Frankish realms.

=== Society ===
Immediately after the fall of Rome and through the Merovingian dynasty, trading towns were re-established in the ruins of ancient cities. These specialised in exchange of goods, craft and agriculture, and were mostly independent of aristocratic control. Carolingian Francia saw royal sponsorship for the construction of monastic cities, built to showcase a revival of the architecture of ancient Rome. Administration was conducted by bishops. The old Gallo-Roman aristocrats had survived in prestige and as an institution by taking up the episcopal offices, and they were now put in charge of fields such as justice, infrastructure, education and social services. Kings were legitimized by their links with the religious institutions. Episcopal elections became supervised by the kings, and royal confirmation helped to strengthen the bishops' authority as well. There were improvements in agriculture, notably the adoption of a heavy plough and the growing use of the three-field system.

=== Currency ===
Byzantine coinage was in use in Francia before Theudebert I began minting his own money at the start of his reign. Theudebert's successor restored the Byzantine emperor's image on the coinage, and the Byzantine emperors continued to be depicted on some Frankish coins until the reign of Emperor Heraclius before disappearing in 613. The solidus and triens were minted in Francia between 534 and 679. The denarius (or denier) appeared later, in the name of Childeric II and various non-royals around 673–675. A Carolingian denarius replaced the Merovingian one, and the Frisian penning was used in Gaul from 755 to the 11th century.

The denarius subsequently appeared in Italy issued in the name of Carolingian monarchs after 794, later by so-called "native" kings in the tenth century, and later still by the German emperors from Otto I (962). Finally, denarii were issued in Rome in the names of pope and emperor from Leo III and Charlemagne onwards to the late 10th century.

== See also ==
- List of Frankish kings
