= Godinus =

Godinus (or Godin) was a Merovingian noble who succeeded his father Warnachar as mayor of the palace of Burgundy in 626 and held that post until 627. He married his stepmother Bertha (or Bertane) and the king, Clotaire II, hunted him down for this. He fled to the court of Dagobert I, the king's son, in Austrasia, but Clotaire found him in Chartres and executed him.

== Sources ==
- Wallace-Hadrill, John Michael (1960): The Fourth Book of the Chronicle of Fredegar, Nelson, p. 44
- Fox, Yaniv (2014). Power and Religion in Merovingian Gaul: Columbanian Monasticism and the Formation of the Frankish Aristocracy. Cambridge University Press. ISBN 9781107587649.

Preceded by Warnachar	Mayor of the Palace of Burgundy; 626–627	Succeeded by Brodulf
