= Council of Paris (614) =

Christian synod convoked by Chlothar II

The Council of Paris was a synod convoked by King Chlothar II in 614. It was a concilium mixtum, attended by both ecclesiastics and laymen from throughout the kingdom of the Franks. It was the first of three councils held by Chlothar. It helped secure his rule over the whole kingdom, which he only acquired in 613.

The council met in the basilica of Saint Peter. It was attended by 76 metropolitan and suffragan bishops and a single abbot. The ecclesiastical province of Vienne was represented by five bishops, Arles by eleven, Lyon by four, Sens by seven, Eauze by seven, Bourges by seven, Bordeaux by six, Tours by five, Besançon by three, Rouen by six, Trier by three, Cologne by two, Reims by seven and Mainz by three. There were even two attendees from England. Chlothar and his optimates (best men) and fideles (faithful men) were also present. The council concluded on 10 October.

The council issued a set of seventeen written canons. It prohibited Jews from holding any military or public office in which they had the power of command over Christians unless they accepted baptism. This may have been motivated in part by the support given to Chlothar's aunt and rival, Brunhild, by Jewish refugees from Visigothic Spain. On 18 October, Chlothar used fourteen of the canons as a basis for his Edict of Paris, but he modified them as it suited him. The alterations, although in some instances undercutting the bishops' purposes, "did not negate the original canons [but] merely clarified the circumstances in which the monarchy would enforce them." Nevertheless, at the Council of Clichy in 626 or 627, the assembled bishops referred to the canons of the Council of Paris as having the king's authority.

The canons of the council are preserved in two collections, the Collectio Remensis and Collectio Diessensis, both with eighth-century manuscripts. Four of its canons (6, 11, 14 and 15) were included among the False Decretals in the mid-ninth century. A few canons were picked up by later canonists. Regino of Prüm included some in his Libri duo de synodalibus causis. Burchard of Worms and Gratian adopted canons 6 and 15 from Regino. Ivo of Chartres included 15 in his Decretum.

According to the biography of Saint Agilus, he and Eustasius were sent to evangelize neighbouring peoples by a council convoked by Chlothar after he unified the kingdom and about three years after Columban's exile. This could be the council of Paris of 614, although neither Agilus nor Eustasius signed the canons.

== Bibliography ==
- Bachrach, Bernard S. (1977). Early Medieval Jewish Policy in Western Europe. University of Minnesota Press.
- Halfond, Gregory I. (2010). The Archaeology of Frankish Church Councils, AD 511–768. Brill.
