= Edict of Paris =

614 edict by Frankish king Chlothar II

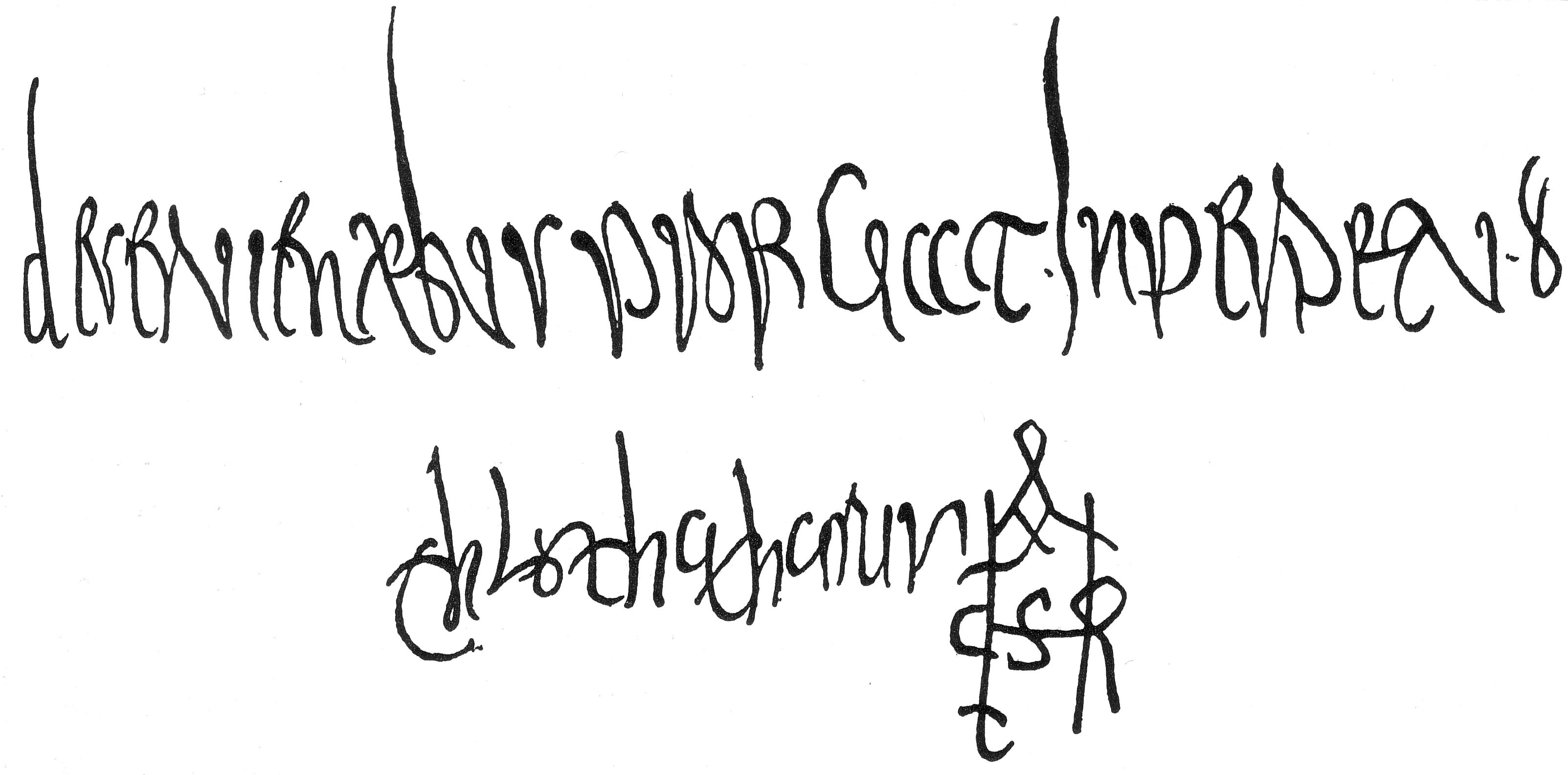
Chlothar II's signature, from a document of 625

The Edict of Paris (in Latin: Chlotarii II Edictum, in French: Édit de Clotaire II) was promulgated 18 October 614 in Paris by Chlothar II, the Merovingian king of the Franks. It is a body of legislation focused on administering justice and ensuring the rights of the church, aristocracy, and people of Francia. The 24-article Edict was issued directly after the Council of Paris; many of its clauses were based on the canons of the church council. It is the last of the Merovingian capitularia, a series of legal ordinances governing church and realm.

== Background ==
Civil war had dominated the Frankish kingdom due to a feud between two Merovingian queens, Brunhild and Fredegund, and their descendants. Due to her supposed autocratic rule, the aristocracy of Austrasia and Burgundy switched their loyalties from Brunhild, and her great-grandson Sigibert, to Fredegund’s son Chlothar II. In 613, these dukes aided Chlothar in capturing both Brunhild and Sigibert. Sigibert, his brother Corbus, and Brunhild were all executed. Chlothar II assumed full kingship and united all of Francia under his rule. In 614, Chlothar II held the Council of Paris, followed by issuing the Edict of Paris. Both were meant to correct the abuses and injustices incurred by the previous regime of Brunhild and restore peace.

== Content ==
The Edict throughout attempts to establish order by standardising orderly appointments to offices, both ecclesiastic and secular, and by asserting the responsibilities of all—the magnates, bishops, and the king—to secure the happiness and peace of the realm: the felicitas regni and pax et disciplina in regno. The twenty-four articles in the Edict address issues related to clergy, criminal matters, the administration of justice, and fiscal concerns. Fourteen of the articles drew directly from the canons issued at the previous week's Council of Paris.

=== Clerical Issues ===
The election and replacement of a bishop would be chosen by the clergy and the people, then ordained by the king. A bishop could not name his own successor. Clergy could only be tried by a public judge in the case of criminal issues and a bishop must be present. Otherwise, they were judged by ecclesiastical courts. Virgins and widows who had committed themselves to God could not be forced into marriage; forcing them to do so would be a capital offense.

=== Criminal Issues ===
Cases that involved both public and ecclesiastical people should be presided over by both secular and church officials. No one, whether free or slave, could be punished without being tried and judged. Jews could not make charges against Christians.

=== Fiscal Issues ===
Property lost during the civil war was to be returned to its owner. Property of the deceased was to go to legitimate heirs, not the king. Swineherds could only enter church or private property with permission of the landlord. Only tolls dating back to the reigns of King Guntrum, Chilperic, and Sigibert were to be collected.

=== Article 12 ===
The most famous of the twenty-four articles is number twelve, which states judges could only be appointed in the region in which they held property. No judge from one region, or province, could be appointed in another. Historically, this had been interpreted as Chlothar II making concessions to the aristocracy (which had sided with him against Brunhild), decreasing royal authority, and increasing the power and influence of the regional magnates. In The State in the Middle Ages, Heinrich Mitteis compared the Edict to the English Magna Carta. Mitteis claimed the Edict was the price Chlothar II had to pay for aristocratic support in the civil war. Chlothar's concessions slowly redirected power from the throne to the magnates. Historians linked this transfer of power from the Edict to the rise of the Carolingians, who eventually supplanted the Merovingians.

Now, Article Twelve is understood differently. Attention has been drawn to the second clause, which states a judge was to be attached to the region they were governing through their own property, which would act as a safeguard against any unlawful property seizes. A judge's property was to be used to ensure fair governing. Thus, Article Twelve was aimed at restraining local officials, not giving them more power.

Latin: Et nullus iudex de aliis provinciis aut regionibus in alia loca ordinetur; ut, se aliquid mali de quibuslibet condicionibus perpetraverit, de suis propriis rebus exinde quod male abstolerit iuxta legis ordine debeat restaurare.

English Translation: and no judge from other provinces or regions shall be assigned to other places; so that, if he has done something wrong in any situation, he must restore from his own things what he has wrongly taken away according to the order of the law.

The Edict of Paris is now widely understood as merely a modest concession to regional landholders, a sign of the 'intensely local character of Francia', and Chlothar II establishing his authority over the realm, but also pledging to respect the privileges and customs of the provinces in order to restore peace and order.

The Edict of Paris remained in force during the reign of his successor, Dagobert.
