= Pepin of Landen =

Mayor of the Palace of Austrasia under King Dagobert I (623-629)

Pepin Ι of Landen
- Mayor of the palace of Austrasia
- Born: 580
- Died: 640
- Noble family: Pippinids (named after him)
- Spouse: Itta of Metz
- Issue: Begga; Grimoald; Bavo; Gertrude
- Father: Carloman

Pepin I (also Peppin, Pipin, or Pippin) of Landen (c. 580 – 21 February 640), also called the Elder or the Old, was the Mayor of the palace of Austrasia under the Merovingian King Dagobert I from 623 to 629. He was also the Mayor for Sigebert III from 639 until his death.

== Life ==
Pepin's father was named Carloman by the Chronicle of Fredegar, the chief source for his life. His byname comes from his probable birthplace: Landen, modern Belgium. However, according to Godefroid Kurth, it was only in the twelfth century that the chroniclers of Brabant began to associate him with that locality. He is sometimes called Pepin I and his other nicknames (Elder and Old) come from his position at the head of the family called the Pippinids after him.

He was lord of a great part of Brabant, and governor of Austrasia, when their king, Theodebert II, was defeated by Theodoric II, king of Burgundy. In 613, several leading magnates of Austrasia and Burgundy abandoned Brunhilda, the great-grandmother and regent of their king, Sigebert II, and turned to Chlothar II of Neustria for support, promising not to rise in defense of the queen-regent and recognizing Chlothar as rightful regent and guardian of the young king. Chief among these leading men were Warnachar II, Rado, Arnulf, and Pepin. The latter two were described by Fredegar as the "two most powerful barons of Austrasia" and they made some agreement with Chlothar at Andernach. However, while Rado was confirmed as mayor in Austrasia and Warnachar in Burgundy, Pepin did not receive his reward until 623, when he was appointed mayor in Austrasia after Chlothar made his young son Dagobert king there. Arnulf, his lifelong friend, was appointed adviser to the new king alongside him.

Pepin was praised by his contemporaries for his good government and wise counsel. Though some enemies tried to turn the king against him, their plots were foiled and Pepin remained on good terms with the king until 629, when, for reasons unknown, he retired (or was retired) to his estates, where he remained for the next decade, until Dagobert's death.

On Dagobert's death, Pepin came out of retirement to take on the mayoralty in Austrasia for the heir Sigebert III and to oversee the distribution of the treasury between Sigebert and his brother, Clovis II, and his stepmother Nanthild, who was ruling on Clovis' behalf in Neustria and Burgundy. Sigebert's share of the inheritance was amicably surrendered, partly because of the friendship between Pepin and the Burgundian mayor of the palace, Aega. Pepin and Arnulf's successor as chief counselor to the king, Cunibert, Bishop of Cologne, received the treasure at Compiègne and brought it back to Metz. Pepin died in 640. He was so popular in Austrasia that, though he was never canonized, he was listed as a saint in some martyrologies. Butler lists him as "blessed". His feast day was 21 February.

== Marriage and children ==
Married Itta of Metz and had four children:

- Begga
- Grimoald
- Bavo
- Gertrude

== Sources ==
- Oman, Charles. The Dark Ages 476–918. London: Rivingtons, 1914.
- Wallace-Hadrill, J. M., translator. The Fourth Book of the Chronicle of Fredegar with its Continuations. Connecticut: Greenwood Press, 1960. [this document is not sourced and is nonfiction and authenticity should be advised.]

Preceded by Hugh; Adalgisel	Mayor of the Palace of Austrasia; 623–629; 639–640	Succeeded by Adalgisel; Otto
