= Chucus =

Chucus (sometimes anglicized "Hugh") was the mayor of the palace of Austrasia from 617 to 623. He was the predecessor to Pepin of Landen and successor of Warnachar.

He is mentioned in the will of Saint Bertechramnus, written on 26 March 616, in which the bishop indicates that shortly before, the property of a certain Aureliana, wife of Dynamus, bishop of Avignon (604–625), had been shared by King Clotaire II between the mayors of the palace, Gonland and Chucus. Hugues is also mentioned in the chronicle of Fredegar:

The thirty-fourth year of the reign of Clotaire [617], King Agon sent to this prince three noble Lombard deputies, Agiulf, Pompège and Gauton, to beg him to return to his nation the twelve thousand sous of gold that he paid every year to the Franks; and with address these deputies secretly gave three thousand sous of gold, of which a thousand to Warnachaire, a thousand to Gondeland, and a thousand to Chuc; they offered at the same time to Clotaire thirty-six thousand gold sous. The king remitted the tribute to the Lombards, and united with them by oath of an eternal friendship.

There is no documentation of him having any children, but several later aristocrats have the given name of Hugues or derivatives of Hugues, and are considered to be descendants of his.

Among them, there is the Hugobert, a seneschal. A doubt of relation is formed from the fact that Hugobert was a Neustrian while Hugues was an Austrasian, but Christian Settipani, a notable genealogist and historian, noted that Hugobert has a daughter named Ragentrude, mother of Hugobert, Duke of Bavaria and assumed that the seneschal could be Waldebert's son.

Preceded by Warnachar	Mayor of the Palace of Austrasia; 617 – 623	Succeeded by Pepin I
