= Mayor of the palace =

Merovingian-dynasty term for the manager of the King's household

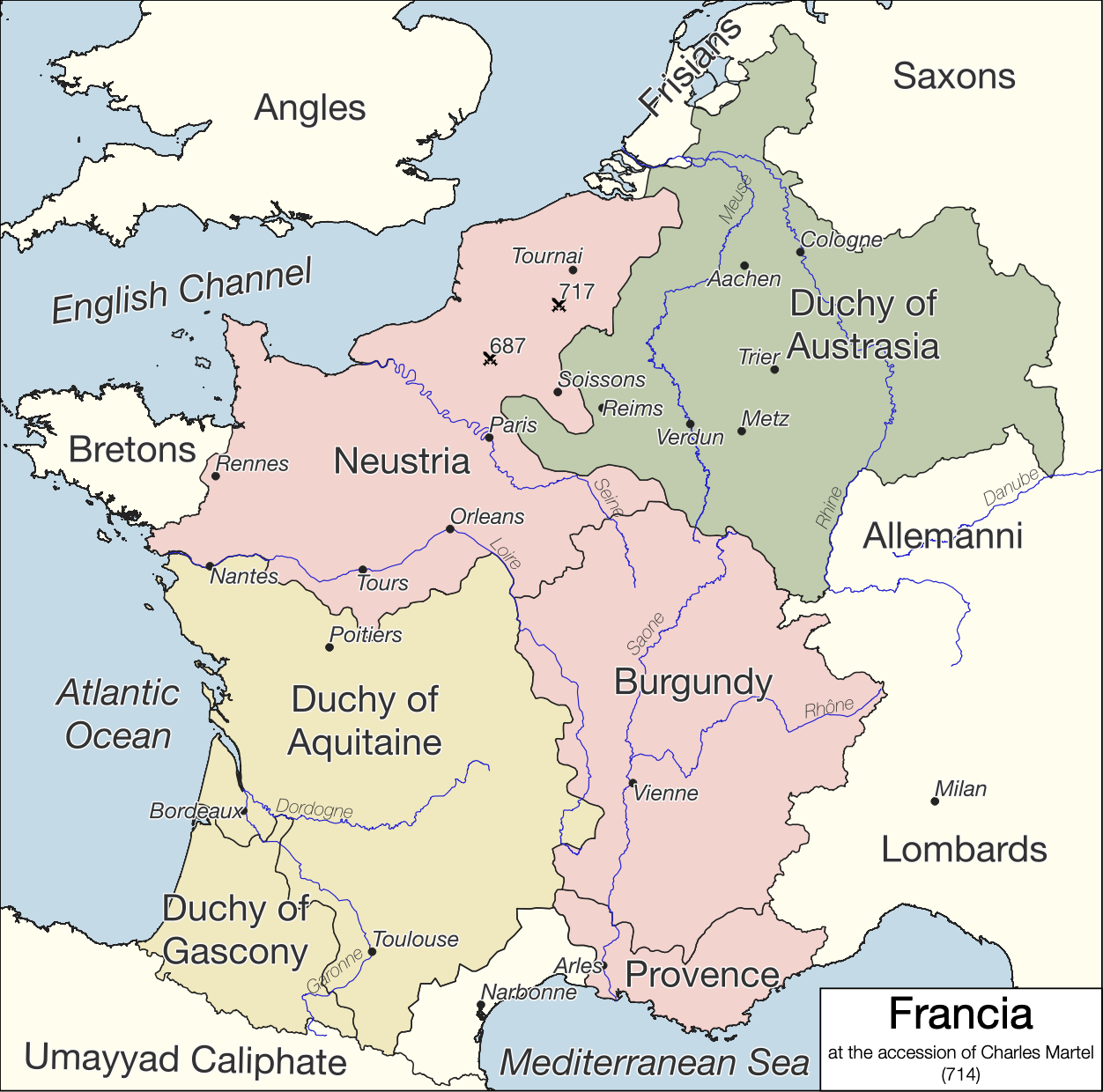
Francia in 714

Under the Merovingian dynasty, the mayor of the palace or majordomo, (Latin: maior palatii or maior domus) was the manager of the household of the Frankish king. He was the head of the Merovingian administrative ladder and orchestrated the operation of the entire court. He was appointed by the king from among the magnates, the most powerful families. Austrasia, Neustria and Burgundy had their own mayor of the palace. After Chlothar II, who ruled over the entire Frankish Kingdom, had ordered the execution of Warnachar, the mayor of Burgundy, the magnates of Burgundy declared in 626 not to want their own mayor anymore. This declaration marks the effective end of the Burgundian court and the beginning of the Neustrian-Burgundian political alliance against Austrasian influence. The Austrasian magnates revolted and the Battle of Tertry of 687 became the Austrasian victory with Pepin of Herstal as their leader and the new mayor of the palace.

During the second half of the seventh century, the office evolved into the "power behind the throne". At that time the mayor of the palace held and wielded the real and effective power to make decisions affecting the kingdom, while the kings were increasingly reduced to performing merely ceremonial functions, which made them little more than figureheads (rois fainéants, 'do-nothing kings').

In 687, after victory over the western kingdom of Neustria, the Austrasian mayor, Pippin of Herstal, took the title Duke of the Franks to signify his augmented rule. His son and successor, Charles Martel, ruled without elevating a new king during the last four years of his reign (737–741). His sons Carloman and Pepin the Short elevated another Merovingian king, Childeric III, but he was eventually deposed in 751 by Pepin, who was crowned king in his place.

== Lists of mayors of the palaces ==
=== Austrasia ===
Name	In office	Family	Remarks
Parthenius	531–548	court position is unknown	
Carloman, father of Pepin of Landen	c. 550-560		
Gogo	567–581	court position is mentioned as 'comes' and 'nutricius'	
Wandalenus	581–583	Waltrichs	
...			
Florentianus	by 589		
...			
Protadus	595–600		
Claudius	600		
Gondulphus	600–612	Merowingians (uncert.)	
Warnachar	613		Short after the assassination of Sigibert II
Rado	613–616/617		
Hugh (Chucus)	617–622	Hugobertins (uncert.)	
Pepin of Landen	624/25–634	Pippinids	First time
Adalgisel	634–639		
Pepin of Landen	639–640	Pippinids	Second time
Otto	640–643		
Grimoald I	643–657 or 662	Pippinids	
Ansegisel	657 or 662–662	Arnulfingians	
Wulfoald	662–679	Etichonen (uncert.)	
Pepin of Herstal	679–714	Pippinids	
Theudoald	714–715	Pippinids	de jure under his grandmother Plectrude
Charles Martel	715–741	Pippinids	After the Battle of Soissons (718) Maior Domus in all parts of the realm
Carloman	741–747	Pippinids	Austrasia containing also Alemania
Pepin the Short	747–751	Pippinids	Maior Domus for the whole realm

=== Neustria ===
- Mummolin (566)
- Landric, under Clotaire II
- Gundoland (613 or 616–639)
- Aega (639–641), also in Burgundy
- Erchinoald (641–658)
- Ebroin (658–673), deposed
- Wulfoald (673–675), also in Austrasia (662–680)
- Leudesius (675), chosen but later deposed
- Ebroin (675–680), again
- Waratto (680 or 681–682), deposed by his son Gistemar
- Gistemar (682), usurper his father Waratton
- Waratto (682–684 or 686), again
- Berchar (686–688 or 689), murdered in 688 or 689
- Nordebert 687-695), under protection of Pippin of Herstal
- Grimoald II (695–714)
- Theudoald (714–715), also in Austrasia. Driven out of Neustria by the nobility, surrendered claim in 716.
- Ragenfrid (715–718), took power in Neustria in 714 or 715 but defeated by Charles Martel first in 717 and definitively in 718
- Charles Martel (718–741), also in Austrasia (715–741)
- Pepin the Short (741 or 742–751), became king of the Franks in 751

=== Burgundy ===
- Warnachar I (596–599)
- Berthoald (before 603–604)
- Protadius (604–606)
- Claudius
- Rado (613–617)
- Warnachar II (617–626), also in Austrasia
- Godinus (626–627)
- ...
- Aega (639–641), also in Neustria
- Flaochad (642)
- Radobertus (642–662)

Hereafter the office remained vacant, with Burgundy a separate realm under the King of Neustria and Burgundy. The administration of Burgundy was briefly separate under:

- Drogo (695–708), also duke of Champagne from 690 and duke of Burgundy from 697

=== Aquitaine ===
- Brodulf (627–628)
