= Adalgisel =

Adalgisel or Adalgis (Adalgyselus ducis in contemporary Latin) was a Frankish duke and the mayor of the palace of Austrasia. He assumed that office in December 633 or January 634 at the same time that Sigebert III assumed the kingship. Along with Cunibert, Bishop of Cologne, he acted as regent for the young king. Adalgisel, Cunibert, and Sigebert were all appointed by Dagobert I.

Adalgisel and Grimoald led the Austrasian army against the Thuringii sometime around 639, but their magnates defected and they were forced to concentrate on protecting the young king's life. His forces were subsequently defeated by Duke Radulf. Not long after, he ceased to be duke and was replaced by Pepin of Landen, probably following the nearly concurrent death of Dagobert. Though he lost his office, there is no evidence that he died at that time and some charters referring to a person of the same name may refer to him, thus indicating his survival long after the fact.

He left a son Bobo, who had accompanied him into battle against the Thuringii, and was later Duke of Auvergne.

== Sources ==
- Wallace-Hadrill, J. M., translator. The Fourth Book of the Chronicle of Fredegar with its Continuations. Greenwood Press: Connecticut, 1960.
- Bachrach, Bernard S. Merovingian Military Organization, 481–751. Minneapolis: University of Minnesota Press, 1971.
