= Rado (mayor of the palace) =

Rado, a brother of Audoin/Ouen and son of Saint Authaire (Audecharius), was the mayor of the palace of Burgundy from 613 to 617.

He, along with Warnachar, Pepin of Landen, and Saint Arnulf, abandoned the cause of the queen Brunhilda and the young king Sigebert II and joined with Clotaire II, promising not to rise in defence of the queen-regent and recognising Clotaire as rightful regent and guardian of Sigebert. He was confirmed in his mayoralty by Clotaire, who also confirmed Warnachar as mayor of Austrasia. Rado (who, like Audoin, spent much of his career as court referendary), was the founder in about 630 of the monastery at Reuil-en-Brie, which from his name was called Radolium.

On Rado's death, Warnachar was confirmed in Burgundy and Austrasia was given to another.

Preceded by Claudius	Mayor of the Palace of Burgundy; 613–617	Succeeded by Warnachar II
