= Warnachar II =

Warnachar (sometimes numbered Warnachar II; in modern French, Warnachaire or Garnier) was the mayor of the palace of Burgundy (617–626) and briefly Austrasia (612–617).

== Biography ==
He began his career as the regent during Theuderic II's minority (596 – c. 604). In 612, when Theuderic became king of Austrasia, he became mayor of the palace. Following Theuderic II's death in 613, he helped Queen Brunhilda secure the accession of the young King Sigebert II, but soon defected to King Clotaire II of Neustria after discovering a plot to kill him, thus betraying Brunhilda into Clotaire's hands. Therefore, when Clotaire then became sole king of the Franks, he left Warnachar as the mayor of the palace of Burgundy and swore that he should never be deposed from this office during his lifetime.

He held this position for over a decade, until he died in 626 (or 627 or 628, when he is said to have called a synod of Burgundian bishops). His son, Godinus, succeeded him.

== Sources ==
- Fox, Yaniv (2014). Power and Religion in Merovingian Gaul: Columbanian Monasticism and the Frankish Elites. Cambridge University Press. ISBN 9781107587649.

Preceded by Rado	Mayor of the Palace of Burgundy; 617–626	Succeeded by Godinus
Preceded by Landric	Mayor of the Palace of Austrasia; 612–617	Succeeded by Hugh
