= Sigebert II =

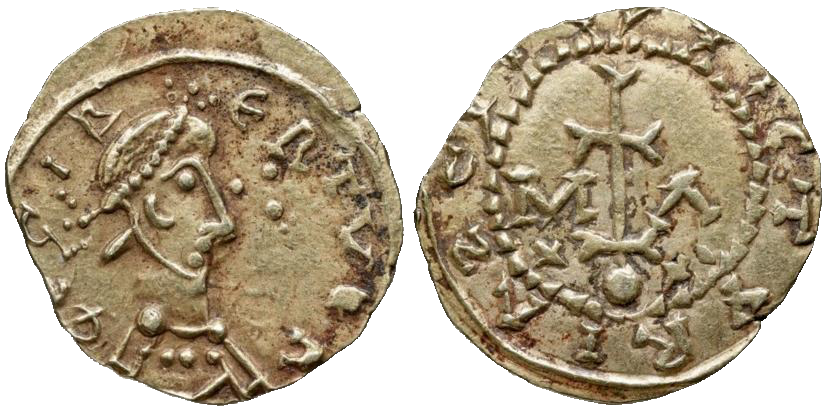
- Effigy of Sigebert II on his coin, minted in Marseille

King of Burgundy and Austrasia
- Reign: 613–613
- Coronation: 613
- Predecessor: Theuderic II
- Successor: Clotaire II (Reunion of entire Frankish kingdom)
- Born: 601
- Died: 613 (aged 12)
- Dynasty: Merovingian
- Father: Theuderic II

See Sigeberht II of Essex for the Saxon ruler by that name.

Sigebert II (601–613), also called Sigisbert II, was the illegitimate son of Theuderic II, from whom he inherited the kingdoms of Burgundy and Austrasia in 613. He was put on the throne by his great-grandmother, Brunhilda, who dominated his short reign.

Warnachar, mayor of the palace of Austrasia had Sigebert brought before a national assembly, where he was proclaimed king by the nobles over both his father's kingdoms. However, when the kingdom was invaded by Clotaire II of Neustria, Warnachar and Rado, mayor of the palace of Burgundy, betrayed Sigebert and Brunhilda and joined with Clotaire, recognising Clotaire as rightful regent and guardian of Sigebert and ordering the army not to oppose the Neustrians. Brunhilda and Sigebert met Clotaire's army on the Aisne, but the Patrician Aletheus, Duke Rocco, and Duke Sigvald deserted her host and Brunhilda and Sigebert were forced to flee, before being taken by Clotaire's men at Lake Neuchâtel.

Brunhilda, little Sigebert and Sigebert's younger brother Corbo were executed by Clotaire's orders, and Austrasia and Neustria were reunited under Clotaire's rule, who now ruled the entire kingdom of the Franks.

Sigebert II Merovingian Dynasty Born: 601 Died: 613
Preceded by Theuderic II	King of Austrasia and Burgundy; 613	Succeeded by Clotaire II
