= Austrasian Letters =

The Austrasian Letters (Latin: Epistulae Austrasicae) is a collection of 48 Latin letters sent from or to Austrasia between the 470s and 590s. The collection is transmitted in a single 9th-century manuscript from the Abbey of Lorsch.

The collection was probably assembled in Metz in the late 6th century. It has been attributed to Bishop Magneric of Trier, who was a counsellor of King Childebert II in the 580s. It is generally thought that the compilation was made for the use of the Austrasian chancery. Recently, however, it has been argued that the compilation was only brought together in the early 9th century at Lorsch.

The letters give insight into the workings of Frankish diplomacy and life at the Austrasian court. The letters give insights into the literacy of the kings' inner circle, along with snippets of information not supplied by other sources of the period. They provide more contemporary evidence for the reign of Clovis I than any other source. The letters are particularly useful in illuminating the complex diplomatic relations between Austrasia and the Byzantine Empire. A majority of the letters concern this relationship.

== Table of letters ==
| Number | Sender | Addressee | Date | Notes |
|---|---|---|---|---|
| 1 | Remigius of Reims | Clovis I | c.509? (Note: before 486?) | |
| 2 | Remigius of Reims | Clovis I | 482/3 (Note: 486?) | |
| 3 | Remigius of Reims | Heraclius, Leo and Theodosius | 512 | |
| 4 | Remigius of Reims | Falco of Tongres | c.511?–533 (Note: perhaps as early as 500) | |
| 5 | Florianus | Nicetius of Trier | 543/552 (Note: 550/552) | |
| 6 | Florianus | Nicetius of Trier | c.550 | |
| 7 | Nicetius of Trier | Justinian I | c.550–553 (Note: before 565) | |
| 8 | Nicetius of Trier | Chlodosuinth | 561/567 (Note: before 568?) | |
| 9 | Germanus of Paris | Brunhild | 575 | |
| 10 | Aurelian of Arles | Theudebert I | c.534 or 546–548 | |
| 11 | Mapinius of Reims | Nicetius of Trier | c.550 | Only known source for the Council of Toul (550). |
| 12 | Dynamius of Provence | Chaming | about or before 580? | |
| 13 | Gogo | Chaming | c.561? (Note: before 575?) | |
| 14 | Venantius Fortunatus | Magneric of Trier | c.566/585 (Note: c.568) | |
| 15 | Mapinius of Reims | Vilicus of Metz | c.542/549 (Note: c.540–550) | |
| 16 | Gogo | Traseric of Toul | c.565–before 581 | |
| 17 | Dynamius of Provence | Vilicus of Metz | 561–568 (Note: 542–568) | |
| 18 | Theudebald | Justinian I | 548/9 (Note: 547) | |
| 19 | Theudebert I | Justinian I | 536–538 (Note: 534–547) | |
| 20 | Theudebert I | Justinian I | 540–545 | |
| 21 | Rufus of Martigny | Nicetius of Trier | c.550 | |
| 22 | Gogo | Peter of Metz | after 568 (Note: 568?) | |
| 23 | Auspicius of Toul | Arbogast of Trier | c.472–474 (Note: c.460) | |
| 24 | unknown | Nicetius of Trier | 561 | |
| 25 | Childebert II | Maurice | 587–588 (Note: 584) | These letters pertain to the embassy sent to the Byzantine Empire in late 587 or early 588. |
| 26 | Brunhild | Maurice | 587–588 | These letters pertain to the embassy sent to the Byzantine Empire in late 587 or early 588. |
| 27 | Brunhild | Athanagild | 587–588 | These letters pertain to the embassy sent to the Byzantine Empire in late 587 or early 588. |
| 28 | Childbert I | Athanagild | 587–588 | These letters pertain to the embassy sent to the Byzantine Empire in late 587 or early 588. |
| 29 | Brunhild | Anastasia | 587–588 | These letters pertain to the embassy sent to the Byzantine Empire in late 587 or early 588. |
| 30 | Brunhild | Anastasia | 587–588 | These letters pertain to the embassy sent to the Byzantine Empire in late 587 or early 588. |
| 31 | Childebert II | John IV of Constantinople | 587–588 | These letters pertain to the embassy sent to the Byzantine Empire in late 587 or early 588. |
| 32 | Childebert II | Honoratus the Apocrisarius | 587–588 | These letters pertain to the embassy sent to the Byzantine Empire in late 587 or early 588. |
| 33 | Childebert II | Domitian of Melitene | 587–588 | These letters pertain to the embassy sent to the Byzantine Empire in late 587 or early 588. |
| 34 | Childebert II | Theodore the Magister | 587–588 | These letters pertain to the embassy sent to the Byzantine Empire in late 587 or early 588. |
| 35 | Childebert II | John the Quaestor | 587–588 | These letters pertain to the embassy sent to the Byzantine Empire in late 587 or early 588. |
| 36 | Childebert II | Megas the Curator | 587–588 | These letters pertain to the embassy sent to the Byzantine Empire in late 587 or early 588. |
| 37 | Childebert II | Paul | 587–588 | These letters pertain to the embassy sent to the Byzantine Empire in late 587 or early 588. |
| 38 | Childebert II | Italica the Patrician | 587–588 | These letters pertain to the embassy sent to the Byzantine Empire in late 587 or early 588. |
| 39 | Childebert II | Venantius the Patrician | 587–588 | These letters pertain to the embassy sent to the Byzantine Empire in late 587 or early 588. |
| 40 | Romanus (?) | Childebert II | 590 (Note: 585) | |
| 41 | Romanus | Childebert II | 590 | |
| 42 | Maurice | Childebert II | 585? (Note: 590) | |
| 43 | Fortunatus | Theodosius | 585 | These letters pertain to the embassy sent to the Byzantine Empire in 585–586 with the possible exception of no. 46, which more likely pertains to that of 589. |
| 44 | Brunhild | Anastasia | 585 | These letters pertain to the embassy sent to the Byzantine Empire in 585–586 with the possible exception of no. 46, which more likely pertains to that of 589. |
| 45 | Childebert II | John IV of Constantinople | 585 | These letters pertain to the embassy sent to the Byzantine Empire in 585–586 with the possible exception of no. 46, which more likely pertains to that of 589. |
| 46 | Childebert II | Lawrence II of Milan | 589 (Note: 585 or 587) | These letters pertain to the embassy sent to the Byzantine Empire in 585–586 with the possible exception of no. 46, which more likely pertains to that of 589. |
| 47 | Childebert II | Maurice | 585 | These letters pertain to the embassy sent to the Byzantine Empire in 585–586 with the possible exception of no. 46, which more likely pertains to that of 589. |
| 48 | Gogo | Grasulf of Istria | before 581? | |

== Editions ==
- Gundlach, Wilhelm, ed. (1892). "Epistolae Austrasicae". Epistolae Merowingici et Karolini Aevi I. Monumenta Germaniae Historica. Vol. Epistolae 3. Berlin. pp. 110–153.
- Malaspina, Elena, ed. (2001). Il Liber epistolarum della cancelleria austrasica (sec. V–VI). Rome: Herder.

== Bibliography ==
- Barrett, Graham; Woudhuysen, George (2016). "Assembling the Austrasian Letters at Trier and Lorsch" (PDF). Early Medieval Europe. 24 (1): 3–57. doi:10.1111/emed.12132. S2CID 164122125.
- Dumézil, Bruno; Loseby, Simon (2018). "Epistulae Austrasicae". In Nicholson, Oliver (ed.). The Oxford Dictionary of Late Antiquity, Volume 1: A–I. Oxford: Oxford University Press. p. 550. ISBN 978-0-19-881624-9.
- Goubert, Paul (1951). "Chronologie des lettres austrasiennes". Mélanges d'histoire du Moyen Âge dédiés à la mémoire de Louis Halphen. Paris. pp. 291–296.
- McCormick, Michael (1991). "Epistolae Austrasicae". In Kazhdan, Alexander (ed.). The Oxford Dictionary of Byzantium. Oxford and New York: Oxford University Press. ISBN 0-19-504652-8.
- Tyrrell, V. Alice (2012). Merovingian Letters and Letter Writers (PDF) (PhD diss.). University of Toronto.
- Tyrrell, V. Alice (2019). Merovingian Letters and Letter Writers. Brepols.
