= Nicetius (disambiguation) =

Nicetius can refer to:

- Nicetius, bishop of Trier
- Nicetius of Lyon, bishop of Lyon
- Nicetius of Provence, rector of Provence
