= Dynamius of Provence =

Ruler of Provence

Dynamius or Dinamius was the Rector of Provence (rector Provinciae) from 575, when he replaced Albinus. At the time, Provence and Austrasia lay within the kingdom of Childebert II, though half of Marseille, the chief Provençal city, was under the lordship of Guntram, King of Burgundy.

Dynamius and Guntram allied together for their own mutual benefit at the expense of Childebert. Dynamius instigated the canons of the Diocese of Uzès to elect their deacon Marcellus, son of the senator Felix, as bishop in opposition to their already-elected bishop Jovinus, a former governor of Provence. While Jovinus and Theodore, Bishop of Marseille, were travelling to the court of Childebert II, Guntram had them arrested. Dynamius, meanwhile, blocked Gundulf, a duke of an important senatorial family and Childebert's former domesticus, from entering Marseille on behalf of Childebert. Eventually he was forced to yield, though he later arrested Theodore again and had him sent to Guntram.

Despite his revolt, which saw him replaced by Leudegisel (585) and Nicetius (587), he was reconciled with Childebert and formally restored to favour on 28 November 587. According to the poet Venantius Fortunatus, with whom he had a correspondence, Dynamius was a man of culture, a poet, and an author of saints' lives. Dynamius' wife, Eucheria, wrote poetry as well: one of her poems, a list of impossible things, is extant. Dynamius also corresponded with Gregory of Tours, who mentions that he was "pious" and a founder of monasteries.

== Sources ==
- Gregory of Tours. The History of the Franks. 2 vol. trans. O. M. Dalton. Oxford: Clarendon Press, 1967.
- Peter Dronke, Women Writers of the Middle Ages. Cambridge: Cambridge University Press, 1984.
