= Saint-Étienne, Uzès =

Church of Saint-Étienne
- Église Saint-Étienne (French)
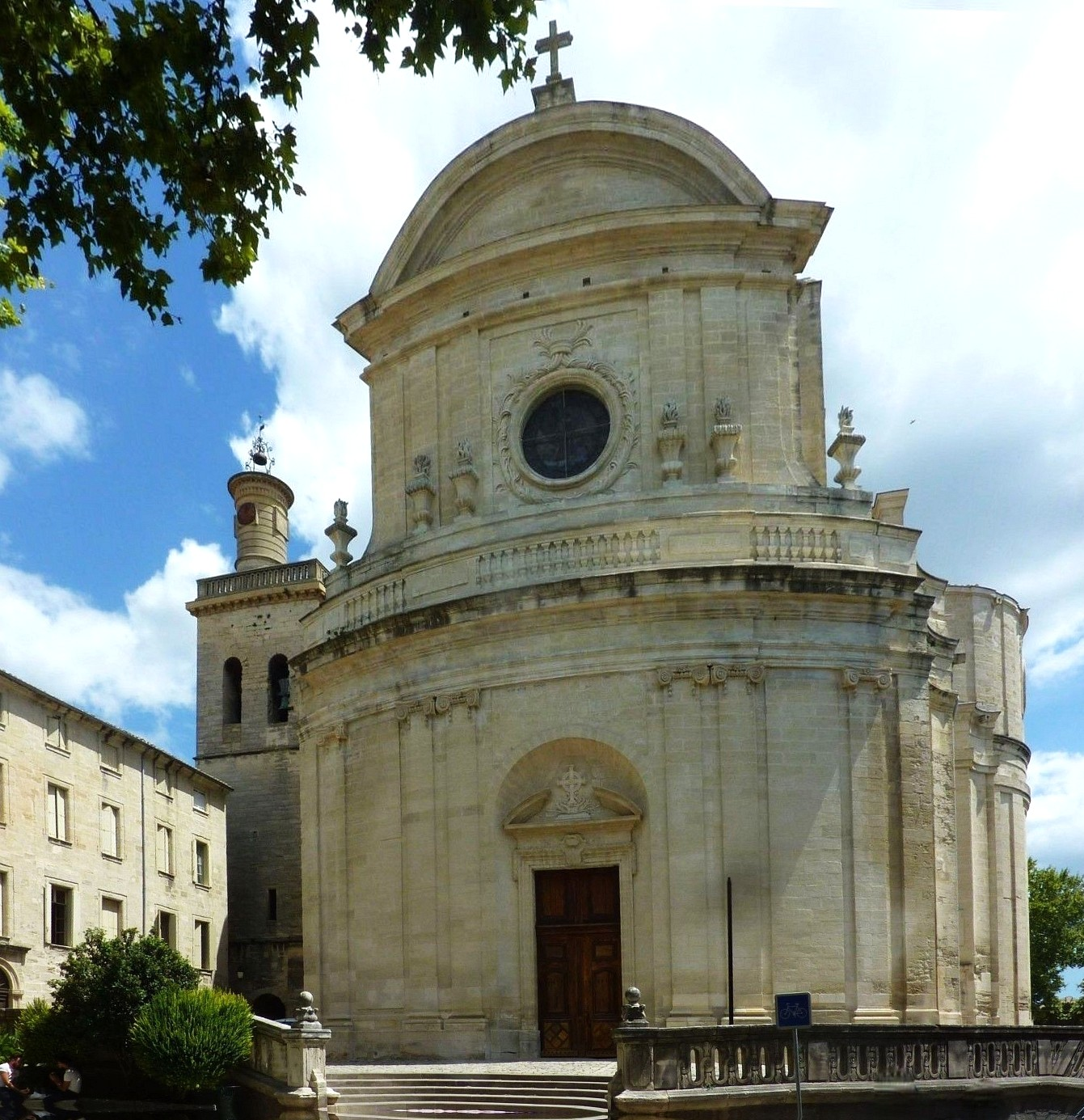
- Façade of Saint-Étienne
- Church of Saint-Étienne
- 44°00′39″N 4°25′08″E
- Location: Uzès, Gard, France
- Denomination: Catholic Church

History
- Dedication: Saint Stephen

Architecture
- Style: Baroque
- Groundbreaking: 1764
- Completed: 1774

Administration
- Diocese: Diocese of Nîmes

Monument historique
- Type: Église
- Designated: 29 November 1974
- Reference no.: PA00103254

The Church of Saint-Étienne is a Roman Catholic church located in Uzès, in the Gard department of France. The baroque church was built in the mid-18th century, and is listed as a French monument historique.

== History ==
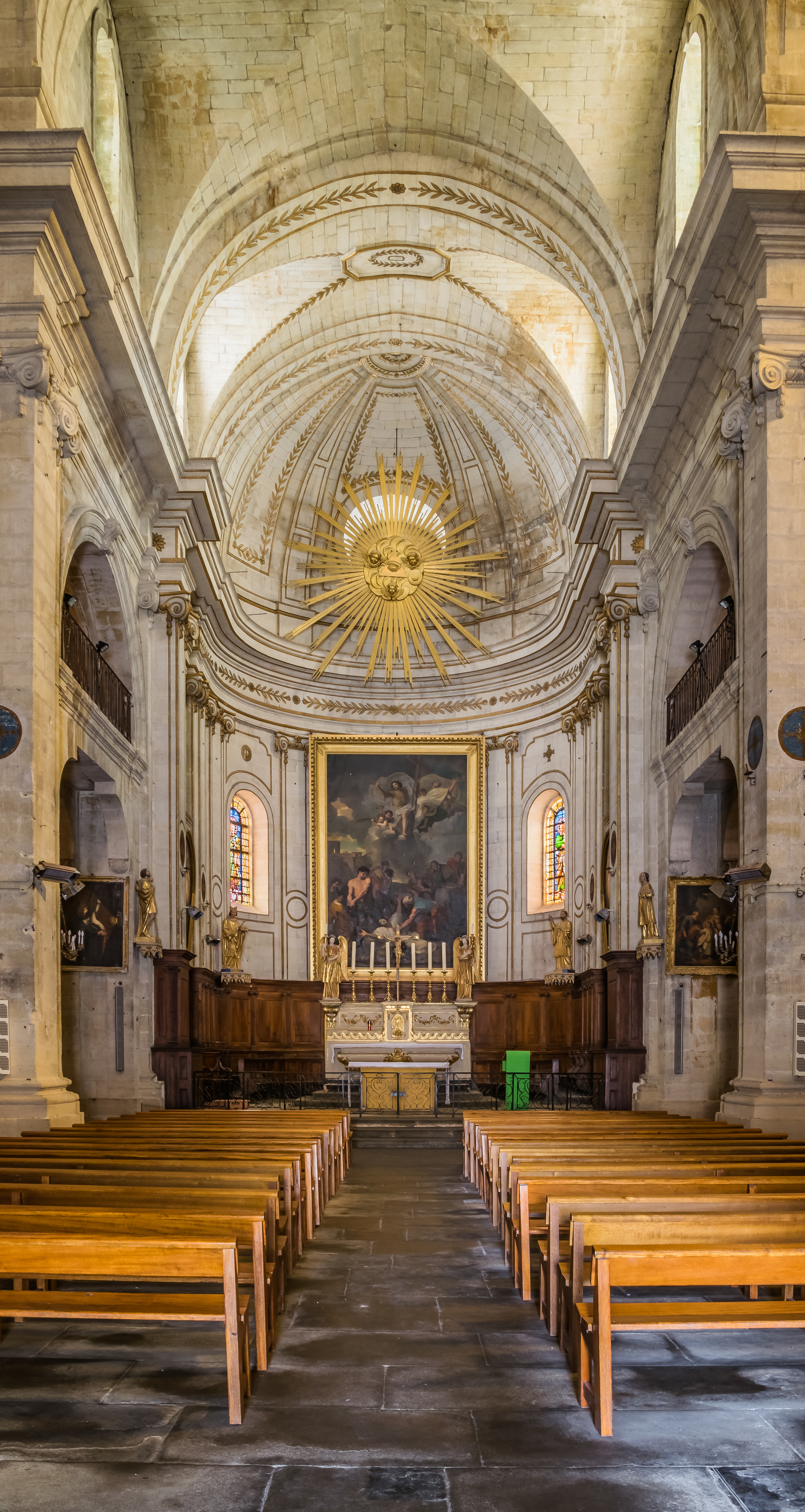
Interior of the church

Commissioned by Bishop Bonaventure Baüyn, the Bishop of Uzès, the Church of Saint-Étienne was built to replace a previous church at the same site that had been destroyed by the Protestants during the Wars of Religion and used as a store and arsenal. The only element that remains of the original church is the bell tower, which dates to the 13th century and was spared to be used as a defensive watchtower. Construction on the baroque building occurred between 1764 and 1774, according to the designed by Pierre Bondon, an architect from Avignon. The cruciform church is laid out in the form of a Greek cross.

The church was classified as a monument historique on 29 November 1974.

== See also ==
- Catholic Church in France
