= Virgilius of Arles =

Virgilius of Arles (died c. 610; Virgil, Virgile) was Archbishop of Arles in Gaul.

According to a life written in the eighth century he was born in a village of Aquitaine, became a monk, Abbot of Lérins, and Bishop of Arles, where he built a basilica of Saint Stephen and another of the Saviour. This life, accepted in its outlines by Mabillon and the Bollandists, is the scarcely modified reproduction of the Life of St. Maximus, Bishop of Riez, written by the patrician Dynamius before the death of Virgilius.

According to Gregory of Tours, Virgilius was first Abbot of the Abbey of St. Symphorian, Autun, and through the support of Syagrius, Bishop of Autun, succeeded Lizier as Bishop of Arles. In his zeal for the conversion of the numerous Jews whom trade attracted to Provence, Virgilius employed force. Gregory the Great wrote (591) to Virgilius, and to Theodore, Bishop of Marseille, praising their good intentions but recommending them to confine their zeal to prayer and preaching.

On 1 August 595, St. Gregory extended to Virgilius the title of pontifical vicar, granted to the bishops of Arles by Pope Zosimus (519); this dignity made him the intermediary between the Gallic episcopate and the Apostolic See. King Childebert was urged by the pope to assist Virgilius in exterminating simony from the Churches of Gaul and Germania. Gregory several times requested Virgilius (596, 601) to extend a welcome to Augustine of Canterbury and his monks, whom he was sending to England. On another occasion he recommended to his protection a monastery belonging to the Patrimony of the Roman Church of which Lizier had taken possession. In a letter to Virgilius and to Syagrius, Bishop of Autun, the pope complains (July, 599) of their negligence in not preventing the marriage of Syagria, a woman who, having embraced the religious life, had been violently given in marriage. In 601 Gregory advised Virgilius to assemble a council against simony and to induce the Bishop of Marseilles to reform his house.

On 23 August 613, Pope Boniface IV sent the pallium to Virgilius's successor Florian.
