= Magneric of Trier =

Frankish bishop and saint

Magneric of Trier (also called Magnerich, or Magnericus) (born c. 522, died c. 596) was a Frankish bishop of Trier. He is a Catholic and Orthodox saint, with a feast day on July 25. Magneric was one of the first bishops with a Germanic name. He was a friend and admirer of Gregory of Tours, mentioned in his History of the Franks, and ordained St Géry, one of his disciples, who became bishop of Cambrai-Arras on the ascent of King Childebert II. Venantius Fortunatus described the Bishop as virtuous and charitable, and an "ornament of bishops".

== Biography ==
Magneric was born and grew up in Trier, Germany. Not much is known about his early life. Once installed as bishop, he continued the work begun by his predecessor of restoring the city of Trier and its environs. He founded several clerical communities, including St. Eucharius and St. Paulin. He had a great devotion to Saint Martin of Tours, and built several monasteries and churches dedicated to him. He converted the Holy Cross Church in Trier to an oratory in honour of St Martin; it later became the Abbey of St. Martin or the Deumelberg. Other churches Magneric dedicated to St Martin are in Yvois, Karden on the Moselle, and a second one in Trier.

He gave sanctuary to bishop Theodore of Marseille when he was exiled by Guntram in 585, and pleaded with King Childebert II on behalf of the bishop.

He lived in the residence of bishop Nicetius, and accompanied the bishop into exile when Nicetius was banished by King Chlothar I. This was an act of revenge for the King being excommunicated. Magneric returned to Trier the next year. He was ordained by Nicetius in 566.

Magneric was close to the Merovingian royal house and Childebert II, who made him godfather of his son Theudebert II in 586. In 587 he attended a family congress of kings Childebert and Guntram, which nearly cost him his life. At the meeting, Duke Gontran Boson, who had been condemned by the King, fled to his house and took the Bishop hostage. The house was set on fire at the King's command.

The proximity to the Merovingian family and his influence on the fortunes of Austrasia and the Gallic Church helped him maintain urban and regional domination until his death.

He was buried in the cemetery of St. Martin's Abbey in Trier. Around the year 1000 Abbot Eberwin wrote a hagiography of the Bishop, whereupon his worship spread throughout Lorraine. In 1506 his grave was opened, and after the destruction of the church his remains disappeared.
