= Jovinus of Provence =

Former Governor of Provence

Jovinus or Jovin was the Governor of Provence from 570 until he was replaced by Sigebert I with Albinus in 573. He was a famous and cultured man and he maintained a brief correspondence with the poet Venantius Fortunatus.

== Testimony ==
He testified against Albinus in court when the latter was charged with imprisoning an archdeacon unlawfully on Christmas Day. Albinus was later replaced by Dynamius and elected to the Diocese of Uzès. When he died, Jovinus was elected bishop in his place. Guntram of Burgundy later had Jovinus arrested as he travelled with Theodore, Bishop of Marseille, to meet Childebert II, because Guntram was then in rivalry concerning the diocese of Marseille. In alliance with Guntram, Dynamius instigated the election of rival candidate in the person of the deacon Marcellus, son of the senator Felix. Marcellus made war on Jovinus but eventually just bought him off.

== Sources ==
- Gregory of Tours. The History of the Franks. 2 vol. trans. O. M. Dalton. Oxford: Clarendon Press, 1967.
