= Albinus of Provence =

Albinus or Albin was the Prefect of Provence from 573 until he was replaced by Dynamius in 575. He was a royal appointee of Sigebert I. After his prefecture was up, he was elected to replace Ferreolus as Bishop of Uzès in 581.

The man he had replaced as prefect, Jovinus, later testified against him in court when it was alleged that he had unlawfully imprisoned an archdeacon on Christmas Day for the theft of a merchant's goods. After Albinus died the cathedral chapter elected Jovinus bishop.

== Sources ==
- Gregory of Tours (1974). The History of the Franks. Translated by Lewis Thorpe. London, England: Penguin UK. ISBN 9780141903798.
