= Crussol =

Crussol may refer to:

== In people ==
- Anne-Charlotte de Crussol de Florensac (1700–1772), French translator and salonniere
- Anne Emmanuel de Crussol d'Amboise (1726-1794), French nobleman and military officer
- Antoine de Crussol, 1st Duke of Uzès (1528-1573), Protestant military commander and peer of France
- Emmanuel de Crussol, 15th Duke of Uzès (1927-1999), French aristocrat
- Jacques de Crussol, member of the chivalric Order of Saint-Michel
- Jacques de Crussol, 2nd Duke of Uzès (1540-1584), Protestant, then Catholic military commander and duke during the French Wars of Religion
- Louis de Crussol, 14th Duke of Uzès (1871-1943), French aristocrat and art collector
- Margaret de Crussol d'Uzès (1932-1977), American‐born oil heiress

== In other ==
- Château de Crussol, mostly-ruined French 12th century limestone castle
- House of Crussol, French noble family
