= Nicetius of Provence =

Sixth-century governor of Provence

Nicetius, or Nicetas, was the Count of Clermont, Duke of Auvergne, and Governor of Provence in the late sixth century.

He sent gifts to Childebert II in order to secure a dukedom. He received, as constituting his duchy, the cities of Rodez, Clermont, and Uzès. According to Gregory of Tours, though he was young at the time, he was "a man of acute insight," who "established peace in the Auvergne."

In 585, he participated in a war against the Visigoths; Gregory strongly criticises his conduct in the war ("crime and deception"). Afterwards, he patrolled the border between Septimania (the Gothic province of Narbonensis) and his own Frankish territory, the so-called "Dukedom of Auvergne."

In 587, he was made governor of Provence (the diocesan province of Marseille) as well. In 588 Theodore, Bishop of Marseille, complained to the king that there had been a plague in Provence. Nicetius was replaced in the countship of Clermont by one Eulalius.

== Sources ==
- Gregory of Tours. The History of the Franks. 2 vol. trans. O. M. Dalton. Oxford: Clarendon Press, 1967.
