= Falco of Maastricht =

Dutch saint

Saint Falco of Maastricht

Bishop of Tongeren
- Died: 512; Tongeren or Maastricht, Kingdom of Francia
- Venerated in: Roman Catholic Church; Eastern Orthodox Church; Anglican communion Lutheranism
- Feast: February 20

Saint Falco, sometimes: Falco of Maastricht or of Tongeren (died 512), was according to tradition bishop of Maastricht from 495 until 512. He is also venerated as a Roman Catholic saint.

In Medieval hagiography he is hardly noted. Yet, Falco is the first bishop of Maastricht, after Servatius, who is securely documented. He is mentioned in an undated letter sent by Saint Remigius, in which Remigius complains about Falco usurping certain rights in Mouzon. He allegedly attended the Council of Auvergne (535) and the Fifth Council of Orléans.

His feast day is February 20, which he shares with Eucharius I, traditionally his predecessor as bishop of Maastricht.
