= Saint-Péray =

- Commune
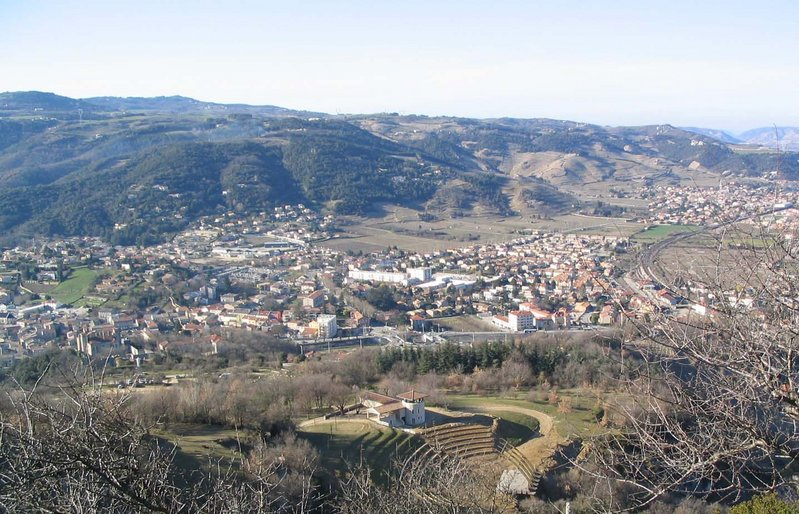
- A general view of Saint-Péray

- Coat of arms
- Location of Saint-Péray
- Location within France Location within Auvergne-Rhône-Alpes
- Coordinates: 44°56′58″N 4°50′45″E
- Country: France
- Region: Auvergne-Rhône-Alpes
- Department: Ardèche
- Arrondissement: Tournon-sur-Rhône
- Canton: Guilherand-Granges

Government
  - Mayor (2025–2026): Frédéric Gerland
- Area^{1}: 24.05 km^{2} (9.29 sq mi)
- Elevation: 128 m (420 ft)
- Highest elevation: 652 m (2,139 ft)
- Lowest elevation: 107 m (351 ft)
- Population (2023): 7,580
  - Density: 315/km^{2} (816/sq mi)
- Time zone: UTC+01:00 (CET)
  - Summer (DST): UTC+02:00 (CEST)
- INSEE/Postal code: 07281 /07130
- ^{1} French Land Register data, which excludes lakes, ponds, glaciers > 1 km^{2} (0.386 sq mi or 247 acres) and river estuaries.

Saint-Péray (French pronunciation: [sɛ̃ peʁɛ]; Occitan: Sant Pèire d'Ai) is a commune in the Ardèche department in the Auvergne-Rhône-Alpes region in southern France. Historically part of the royal province of Vivarais, it has been a significant settlement since the 15th century when inhabitants moved from the fortified castle of Crussol to the valley of Mialan. The village was originally named Saint-Pierre d'Ay, which later evolved into its current name, Saint-Péray.

== Geography ==
Saint-Péray is located at the foot of Crussol Hill, in the western part of the Valence urban area, bordering the Rhône Valley. It serves as a transit point between the Ardèche mountains and the plains of Valence. The commune is characterized by its geological features, primarily composed of sedimentary layers that support a diverse Mediterranean flora and fauna, despite its relatively high latitude.

== Climate ==
The climate in Saint-Péray is classified as Mediterranean with variations, characterized by hot summers and cooler winters. The average annual temperature is around 12.9 °C, with significant temperature fluctuations throughout the year. Rainfall is concentrated in the autumn months, with an annual average of approximately 933 mm.

== Hydrography ==
The eastern part of the commune is bordered by the Rhône River, while the Mialan, a tributary of the Rhône, flows through the town.

== Transport ==
Saint-Péray is accessible via several roadways, including the D86, which connects Lyon to Nîmes. The commune is also served by local bus lines and has a railway station that can accommodate passenger services on a temporary basis.

== Demographics ==
The residents are known as Saint-Pérollais in French.

Historical population

Year	Pop.	±% p.a.
1793	1,559	—
1800	1,652	+0.83%
1806	1,528	−1.29%
1821	1,791	+1.06%
1831	2,321	+2.63%
1836	2,490	+1.42%
1841	2,485	−0.04%
1846	2,720	+1.82%
1851	2,584	−1.02%
1856	2,762	+1.34%
1861	2,680	−0.60%
1866	2,710	+0.22%
1872	2,521	−1.20%
1876	2,815	+2.80%
1881	2,658	−1.14%
1886	2,642	−0.12%
1891	2,555	−0.67%
1896	2,569	+0.11%
1901	2,603	+0.26%

Year	Pop.	±% p.a.
1906	2,658	+0.42%
1911	2,587	−0.54%
1921	2,538	−0.19%
1926	2,595	+0.45%
1931	2,597	+0.02%
1936	2,634	+0.28%
1946	2,797	+0.60%
1954	3,168	+1.57%
1962	3,097	−0.28%
1968	3,592	+2.50%
1975	4,310	+2.64%
1982	5,196	+2.71%
1990	5,886	+1.57%
1999	6,502	+1.11%
2007	7,254	+1.38%
2012	7,311	+0.16%
2017	7,692	+1.02%
2023	7,580	−0.24%

Source: EHESS and INSEE (1968-2023)

== Economy ==
Saint-Péray is renowned for its wine production, particularly its white wines, which are often sparkling and classified within the Saint-Péray appellation, part of the Côtes du Rhône wine region. The local vineyards primarily cultivate the Roussanne and Marsanne grape varieties, producing wines with a pale yellow hue and floral aromas.

== Cultural and Historical Significance ==
The commune has a rich historical background, with references to its early existence found in documents dating back to the 10th century. Saint-Péray has preserved its cultural heritage through various communal activities and partnerships with other European towns, including Groß-Umstadt in Germany and Santo Tirso in Portugal.

== Education and Facilities ==
Saint-Péray hosts several educational institutions, including primary schools and a secondary school, the Collège de Crussol. The community also features sports facilities and a media library.

== See also ==
- Château de Crussol, located on the territory of the commune.
- Communes of the Ardèche department
