= Mapinius =

Mapinius (also spelled Mappinius, Mappinus or Mapinus) was the bishop of Reims from 535 until 550. His name is of Gaulish (Celtic) origin.

Mapinius did not attend the Fifth Council of Orléans in 549 in person, but he sent the archdeacon Protadius as his representative. Two letters he wrote are preserved in the collection known as the Epistulae Austrasicae. In the first, dated to between about 540 and 550 by the editors, Mapinius congratulates Bishop Vilicus of Metz on his seventieth birthday. He also praised him for not only pastoring sheep, but fattening bishops with his charm. This praise was, however, only prefatory to his true purpose, which was to inquire about the price of pigs around Reims. This may have been related to business or to the payment of taxes in kind (pigs) to the crown.

In the second letter, responding to a letter from Bishop Nicetius of Trier, Mapinius apologizes for being unable to attend the Council of Toul in 550. This latter is a valuable historical source for this council. Mapinius indicates that he was invited to the council through a letter from King Theudebald. When he wrote back demanding to know the purpose of the council, he learned that the king wished to overturn Nicetius' excommunication of certain Franks for incest. In his letter to Nicetius, he claimed not have received this information until too late, but some scholars reject this explanation. It may be that he simply did not wish to become involved or to make the journey. There may, however, have been a genuine breakdown in communication between the bishops, if Mapinius and Nicetius were indeed on the same side. Mapinius scolds Nicetius for not informing him directly of the council's purpose, and he asks about the guilt of the excommunicated parties and whether as a bishop he should receive them.

== Bibliography ==
- Barrett, Graham; Woudhuysen, George (2016). "Assembling the Austrasian Letters at Trier and Lorsch" (PDF). Early Medieval Europe. 24 (1): 3–57. doi:10.1111/emed.12132. S2CID 164122125.
- Dumézil, Bruno (2007). "Gogo et ses amis: écriture, échanges et ambitions dans un réseau aristocratique de la fin du VI^{e} siècle". Revue Historique. 309 (Fasc. 3): 553–593. doi:10.3917/rhis.073.0553. JSTOR 40958005.
- Halfond, Gregory I. (2010). Archaeology of Frankish Church Councils, AD 511–768. Brill.
- Halfond, Gregory I. (2020). "Corporate Solidarity and Its Limits within the Gallo-Frankish Episcopate". In Bonnie Effros; Isabel Moreira (eds.). The Oxford Handbook of the Merovingian World. Oxford University Press. pp. 278–298.
- Hubschmid, J. U. (1936). "Ausdrücke der Milchwirtschaft gallischen Ursprungs: dt. senn, ziger, lomb. mascarpa, mašoka, matüs". Vox Romanica. 1: 88–105.
- Kreiner, Jamie (2020). "Agricultural Brokers". Early Medieval Europe. 28 (3): 425–443. doi:10.1111/emed.12410. S2CID 242397537.
- Marone, Paola (2014). "Mapinius of Reims". In Angelo Di Berardino (ed.). Encyclopedia of Ancient Christianity. Vol. II. IVP Academic. p. 668.
- Tyrrell, Vida Alice (2012). Merovingian Letters and Letter Writers (PDF) (PhD diss.). University of Toronto.
