= Council of Toul =

The Council of Toul was a Frankish synod convoked by Theudebald, King of Austrasia, that convened in Toul on 1 June 550. It is not known how many bishops attended. It extended to the ecclesiastical provinces of Reims and Trier and perhaps beyond. The diocese of Toul was a suffragan of Trier. The metropolitan bishop, Nicetius of Trier, was certainly in attendance.

Theudebald apparently convoked the council because Nicetius had begun excommunicating Frankish aristocrats who contracted marriages within the prohibited degree of consanguinity. The king wished to obtain a judgement against the metropolitan and a reversal of the excommunications.

The council is known from a letter of Bishop Mapinius of Reims in the Austrasian Letters collection. He had received an invitation to the council written in the king's name. He had not attended and was writing to explain his absence to Nicetius. He claimed that he had not learned of the purpose of the council in time.

== Bibliography ==
- Dumézil, Bruno (2007). "Gogo et ses amis: écriture, échanges et ambitions dans un réseau aristocratique de la fin du VI^{e} siècle". Revue Historique. 309 (643): 553–593. JSTOR 40958005.
- Halfond, Gregory I. (2010). Archaeology of Frankish Church Councils, AD 511–768. Brill.
- Pohlsander, H. A. (2000). "A Call to Repentance Bishop Nicetius of Trier to the Emperor Justinian". Byzantion. 70 (2): 456–473. JSTOR 44172526.
