= Uzès Cathedral =

Cathedral in Uzès, France

Uzès Cathedral Cathédrale Saint-Théodorit d'Uzès
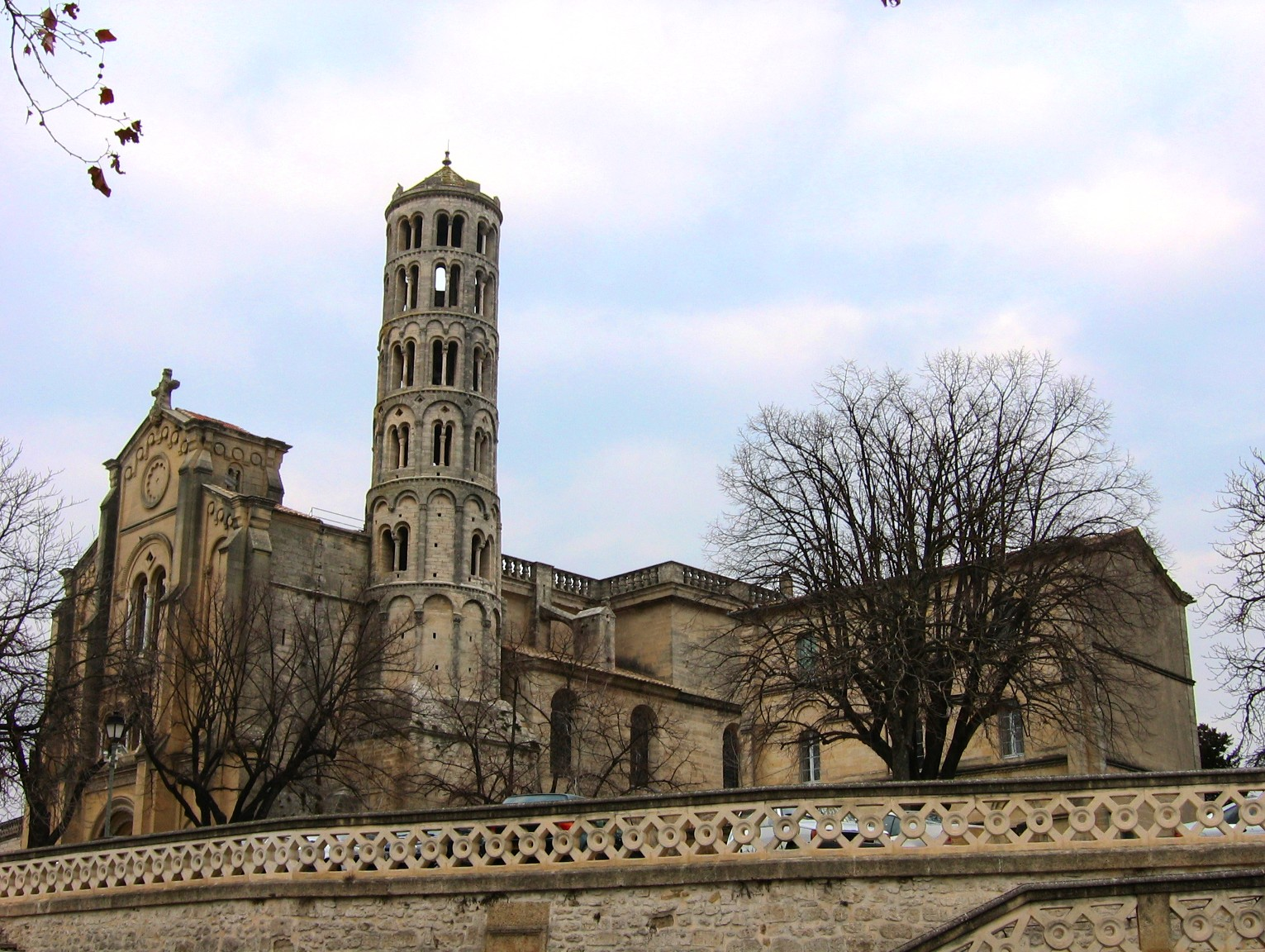
- Uzès Cathedral

Religion
- Affiliation: Roman Catholic Church
- Province: Diocese of Nîmes, Uzès and Alès
- Region: Gard
- Rite: Roman
- Ecclesiastical or organisational status: Cathedral
- Status: Active

Location
- Location: Pamiers, France
- Interactive map of Uzès Cathedral; Cathédrale Saint-Théodorit d'Uzès
- Coordinates: 44°00′44″N 4°25′21″E

Architecture
- Type: church
- Style: Neoclassical
- Groundbreaking: 17th century
- Completed: 19th century

Uzès Cathedral (French: Cathédrale Saint-Théodorit d'Uzès) is a former Roman Catholic church located in Uzès, France. As a cathedral this church was built at the time of the first crusade where several feudal lords of the region participated with their overlord Raymond de Saint-Gilles. It is dedicated to Saint Theodoritus, probably because one of these lords brought back some supposed relics of this catholic saint. The cathedral is now a parish church. Its church bell tower called the "Tour Fenestrelle" has been registered in the official list of French historical monuments in 1862.

The church was formerly the seat of the Bishops of Uzès, until the diocese was abolished under the Concordat of 1801 and its territory passed to the Diocese of Avignon. In 1877, the territory of the former diocese of Uzès was removed from that of Avignon and added to the Diocese of Nîmes, now the Diocese of Nîmes, Uzès and Alès.

The present building, which was gutted during the French Revolution, and after repair and with the addition of a 19th-century Neo-classical façade is now used as a parish church, dates from the 17th century, and was a rebuild of the previous cathedral, which was destroyed during the French Wars of Religion. That cathedral in its turn had been built to replace a still earlier one which had been destroyed in the 12th century during the Albigensian Crusade. The campanile, the well-known Tour Fenestrelle, is the only part to survive from the medieval structure, although it was previously taller by two storeys.

== Interior ==
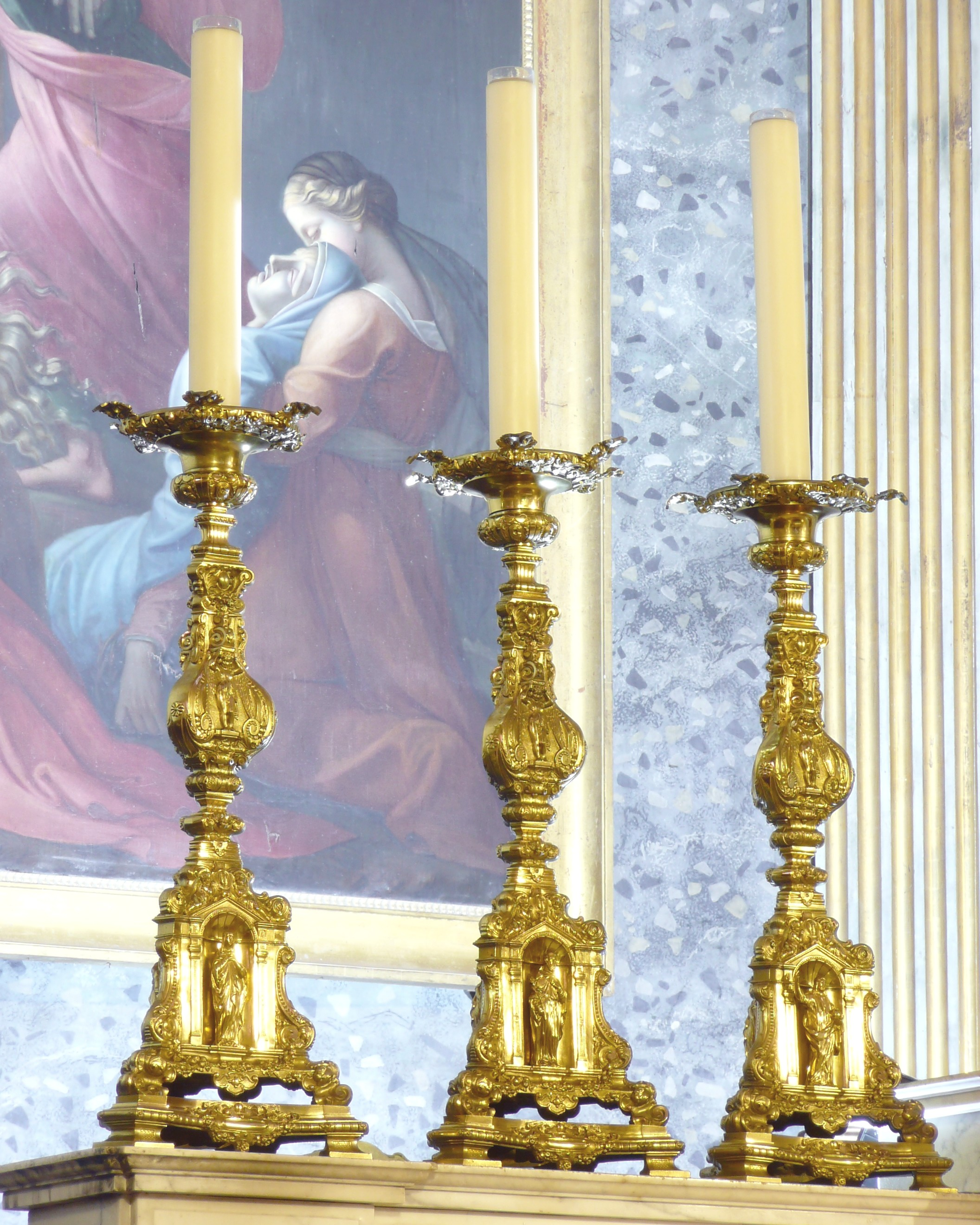
Candlesticks

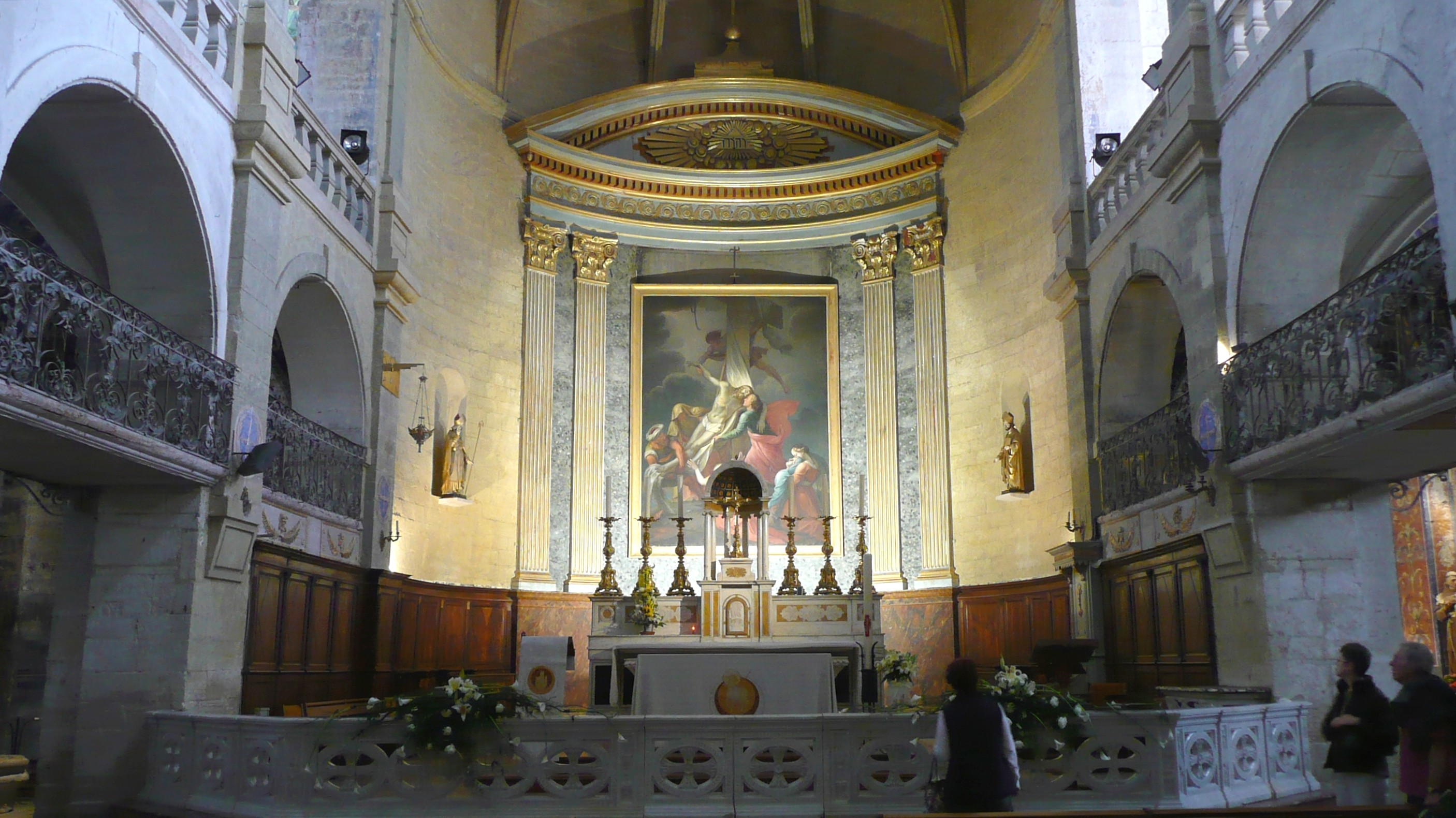
Altar

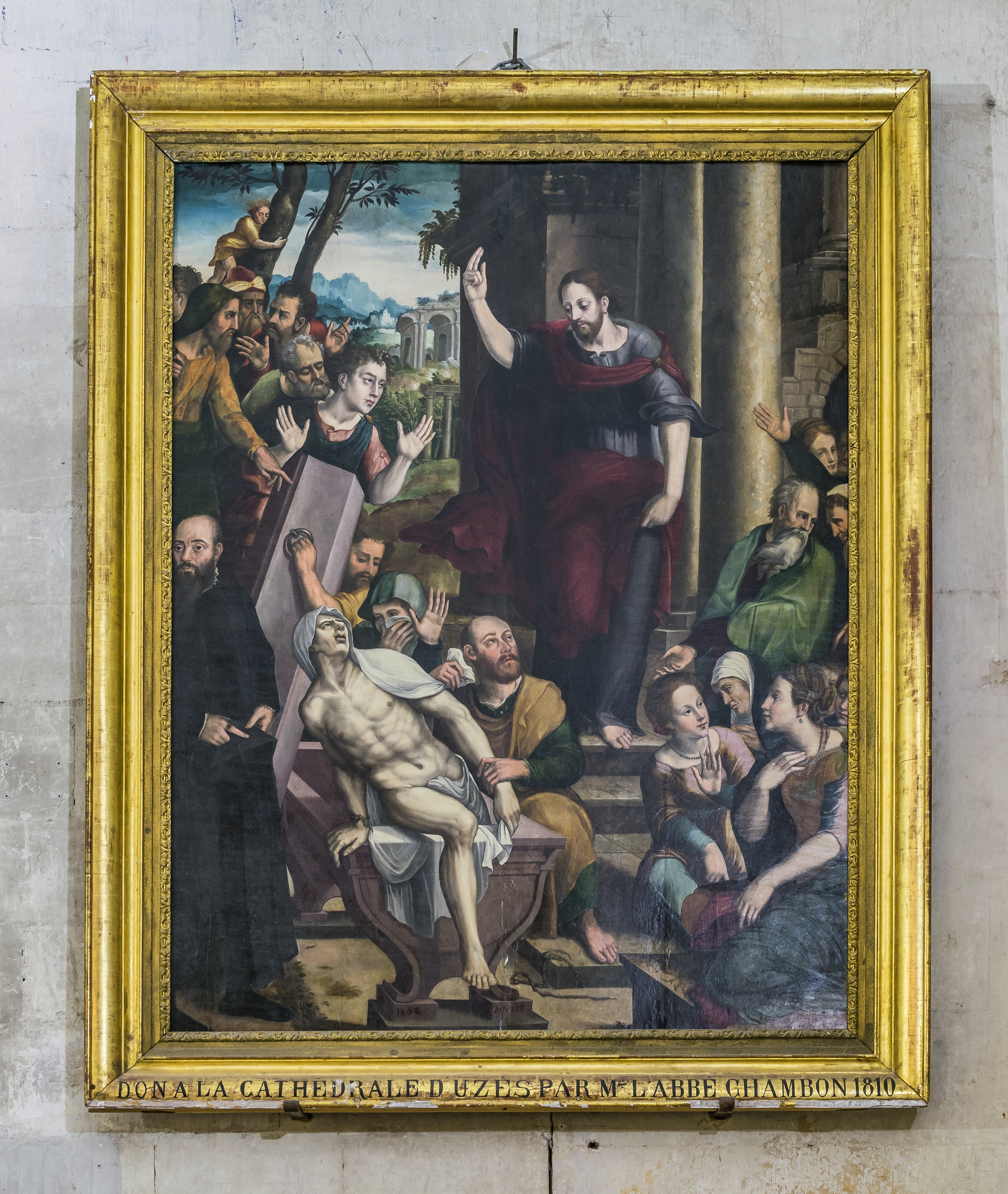
La Résurrection de Lazare

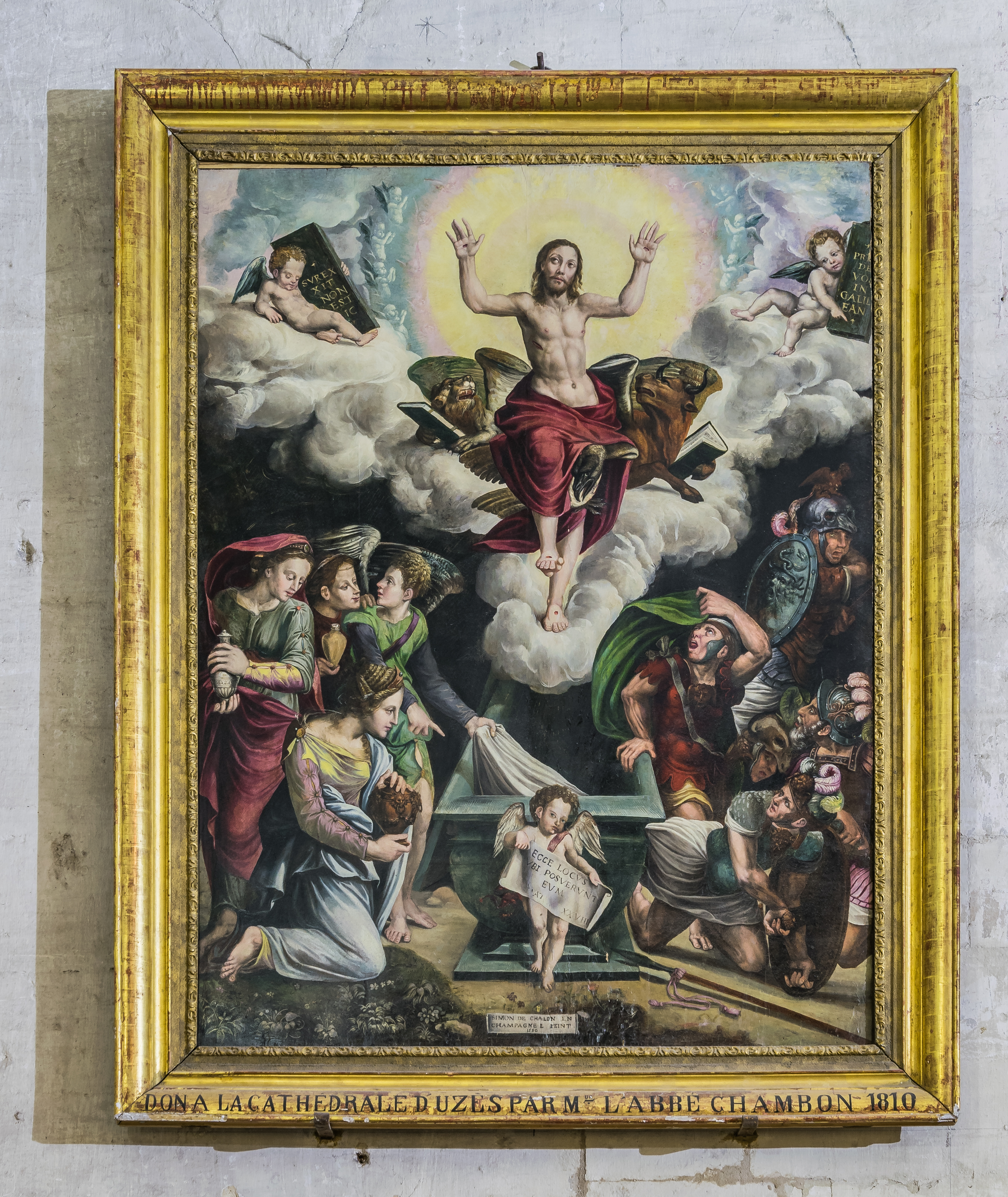
La Résurrection du Christ

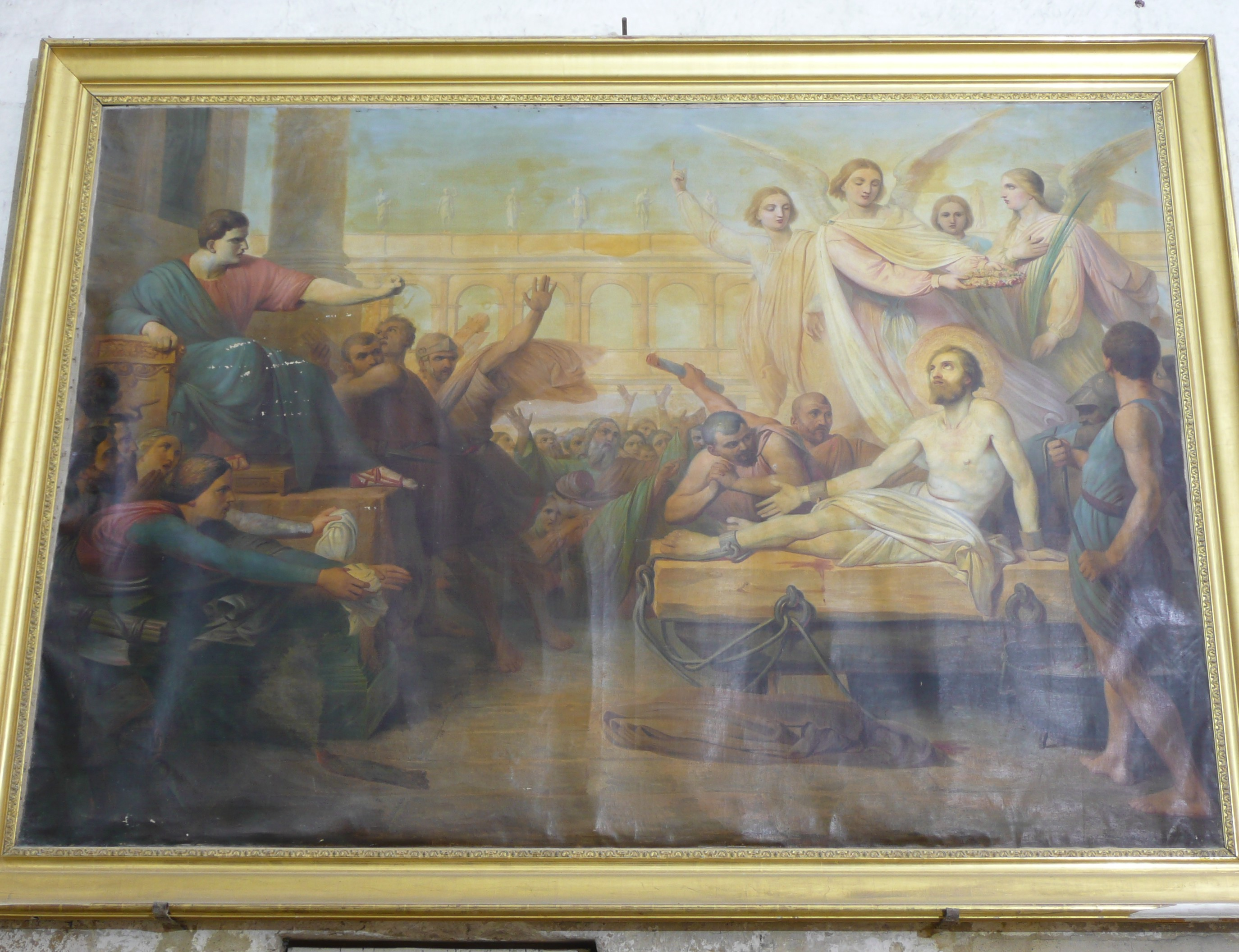
Interior art

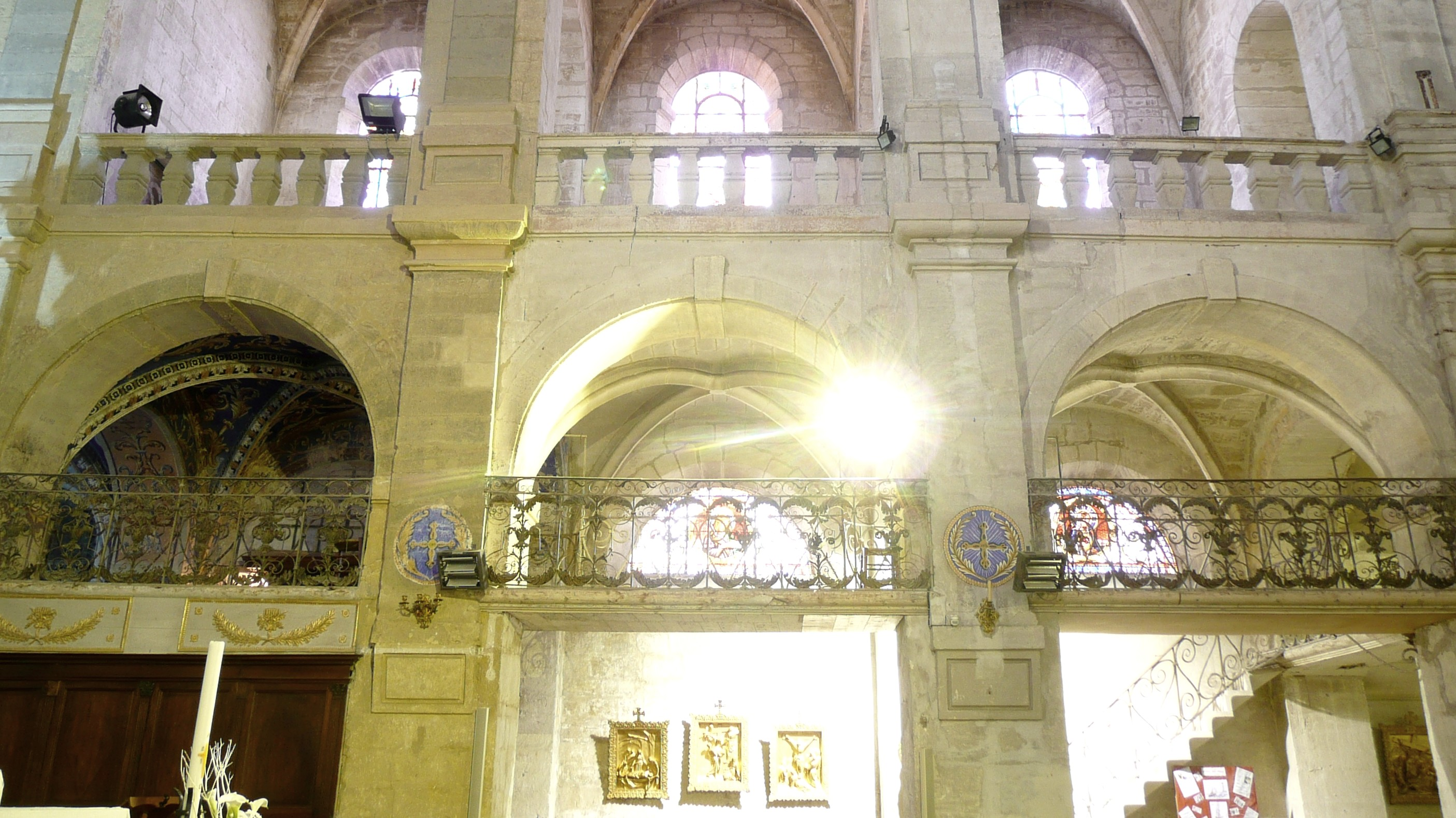
Interior

== Sources and external links ==
- Photographs: Exterior, interior
- Catholic Hierarchy: Diocese of Uzès
