= Château de Crussol =

Castle in Saint-Péray, Ardèche, France

Coordinates: 44°56′18″N 4°51′09″E

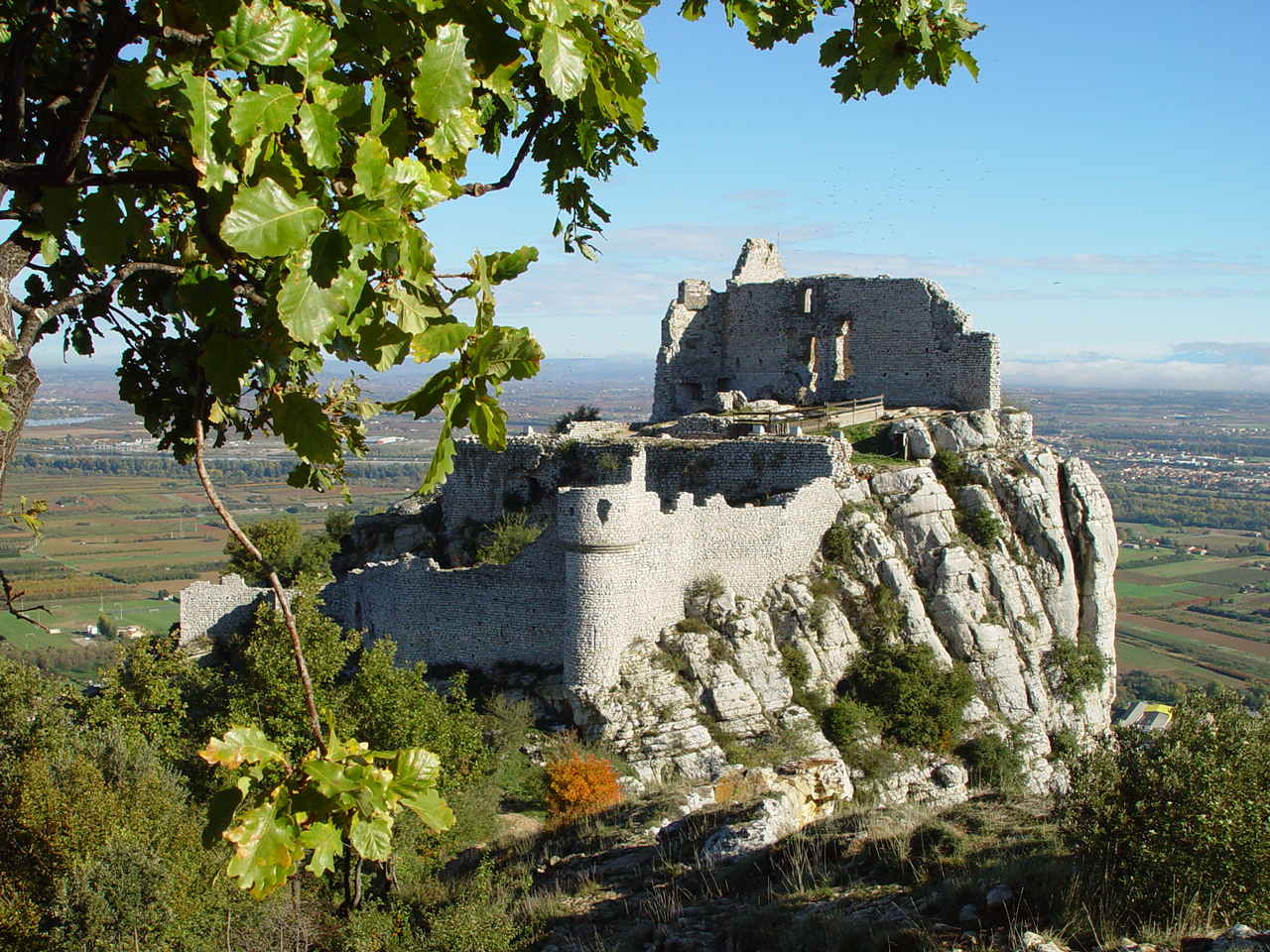
The Château de Crussol

The Château de Crussol is a mostly-ruined 12th century limestone castle in the commune of Saint-Péray that dominates the valley of Rhône, just opposite Valence in the Ardèche département, Rhône-Alpes région of France.

== Location ==
Located over the peak of the hill of Crussol, at the edge of a cliff over 200 metres above surrounding plain, the castle overlooks Saint-Péray in the west, and Guilherand-Granges and Valence in the east. The site comprises about 3 hectares, including the Vilette, a small hamlet of about a hundred houses, and the castle itself at the top of the hill. The entire grounds are enclosed by ramparts that are still quite visible.

== History ==
The hill of Crussol has been occupied since Roman times. Initially, it was the site of a temple, which was subsequently extended with a fortified building to the south in the course of the 5th century, but was abandoned in later centuries for the present site. The first fort, probably built in the 10th century, was made of wood and was destroyed in a fire. It was rebuilt in stone in the 12th century, by a lord named Gerald Basset, in order to control the existing transportation route along the Rhône River.

At the end of the 15th century, the Crussols were linked by marriage to the Uzès. The castle was abandoned for the more comfortable Château d'Uzès. During the Religious Wars, the castle was taken and set afire on several occasions by various warlords. It was finally sacked in the 17th century.

On September 3, 1855, a mine explosion in the quarry under the castle destroyed part of the building. Lightning further destroyed part of the keep in 1952.

The site was classified as an official historical monument of France (French: monument historique) in 1927. The commune of Guilherand-Granges bought the ruins in 1984, even though the site is technically within the boundaries of the commune of Saint-Péray. The inter-communal syndicate of these two communes and Soyons are jointly engaged in the restoration of the castle.

== See also ==
- House of Crussol
- List of castles in France
