= Theodoret (martyr) =

Saint Theodoret of Antioch
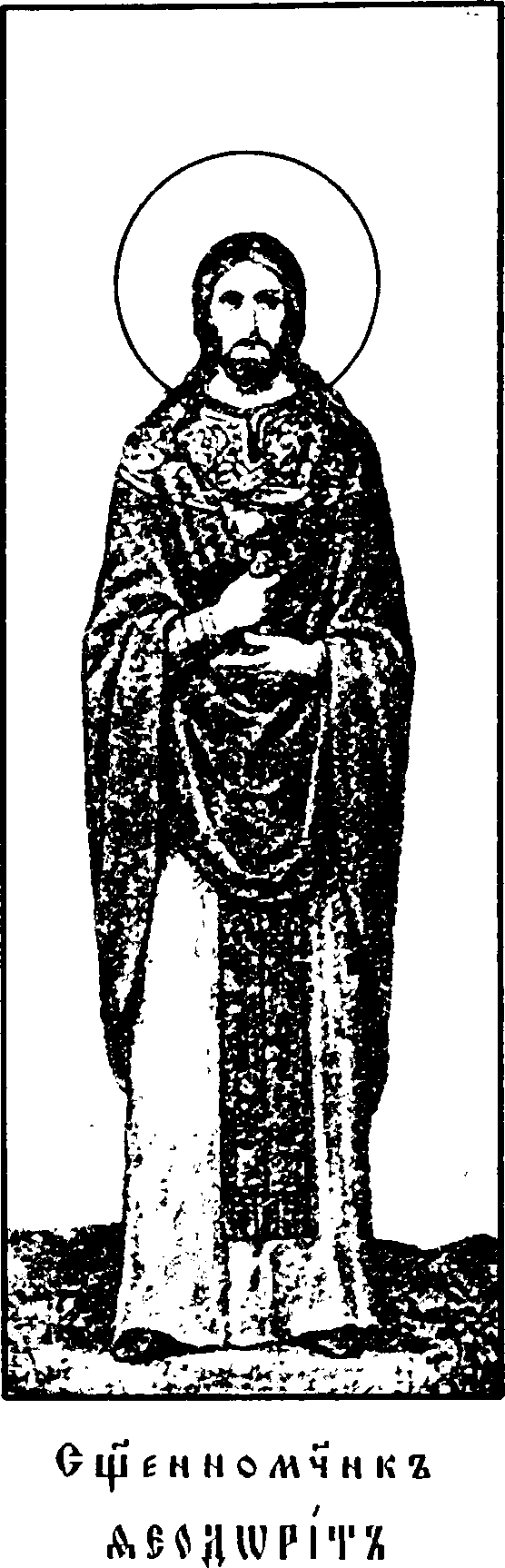

Priest and Hieromartyr
- Born: Antioch, Syria (modern-day Antakya, Hatay, Turkey)
- Died: October 22, 362; Antioch, Syria (now modern-day Antakya, Hatay, Turkey)
- Venerated in: Roman Catholic Church; Eastern Orthodox Church
- Canonized: Pre-congregation
- Major shrine: Uzès Cathedral
- Feast: October 22; October 23

Saint Theodoret of Antioch or Saint Theodoritus of Uzès (Greek: Θεοδώρητος, "God given"; died October 22, 362) was a Greek-speaking Syrian Christian priest who died a martyr in Antioch during the reign of Emperor Julian the Apostate. His life is recorded only by apologetic works. His relics were later taken to Uzès in the south of France and placed in the cathedral, which is dedicated to him.

== Life ==
Emperor Julian the Apostate, who was the nephew of the Emperor Constantine I, made his uncle Julian a count and governor of the East. Hearing that in the treasury of one of churches of Antioch there was much wealth, Count Julian was determined to seize it and published a proclamation banning the clergy. Theodoret, a priest, who was keeper of the sacred vessels, refused to abandon his flock and continued publicly to celebrate the Divine Liturgy. Count Julian ordered that he should be arrested and brought before him, with his hands bound behind his back. Count Julian accused him of having destroyed the statues of the gods in a previous reign. Theodoret retorted by reproaching the Count with his apostasy. Count Julian now ordered that Theodoret be tortured. It was said that Theodoret spoke these words to Count Julian and to the magistrate: "O most wretched man," he said, "you know well that at the day of judgment the crucified God Whom you blaspheme will send you and the tyrant whom you serve to hell." He was later beheaded on October 22, 362.
