= Aredius =

6th-century French abbot and Christian saint

Saint Aredius
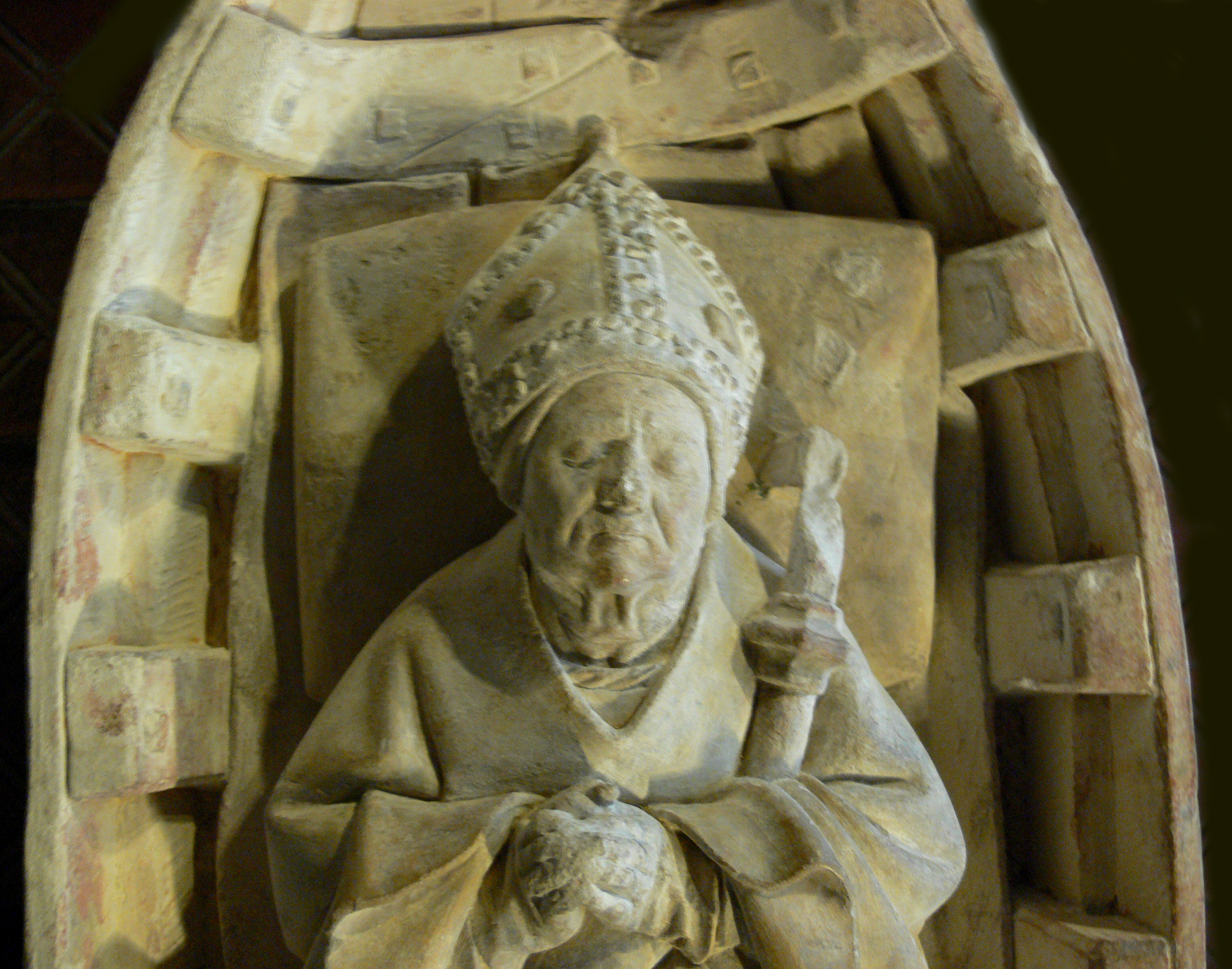
- Saint Aredius

Abbot of Attane
- Born: c. 510; Limoges, France
- Died: 25 August 591: Saint-Yrieix, Haute-Vienne; (later Saint-Yrieix-la-Perche)
- Venerated in: Catholic Church; Eastern Orthodox Church
- Canonized: Pre-congregation
- Feast: 25 August

Aredius, (Note: Being from an Occitan-speaking region, the abbot's birth name was one native to that language: Iriès. This was modified to Yrieix for Francophone ears, and then the Latinised Aredius adopted for official use and in religious life. The Latinate form was then reassimilated into French as Arède.) also Yrieix, Abbé d'Attanum and Arède d'Atane (c. 510 – 25 August 591, at Saint-Yrieix in the Haute-Vienne), was chancellor to Theudebert I, king of Austrasia, and later Abbot of Attane (or Atane, Latin: Attanum). He founded the monastery of Attane, which was renamed after his death Saint-Yrieix in his honour. The town at the site became known as Saint-Yrieix-la-Perche. Several other French communes are also called Saint-Yrieix after him.

He is venerated as a saint in the Catholic and Eastern Orthodox Churches; his feast day is commemorated on the date of his death, 25 August.

== Background and early years ==
Aredius was from a prominent Gallo-Roman family of Limoges, in Limousin, an Occitan-speaking region. He was the son of a noble landowner, Jucundus, and his wife, Pelagia of Limoges. As a young boy he received his education from the abbot Sebastian of the monastery at Vigeois. As a young man, he was sent to the court of the Frankish king Theodebert I of Austrasia (r. 534–548) at Trier. By 540 he was appointed the king's chancellor.

Nicetius, the bishop of Trier persuaded Aredius to leave the dissolute life at court. According to Gregory of Tours, one day, while the clerics sang psalms in the church, a dazzling white dove, after flying around Aredius, landed on his head, as if to show that he was already filled with the Holy Spirit. As he was a little shy, he waved it away, and it flittered a little before landing on its shoulder, and followed him all the way to the bishop's house.

== Monastic establishment and works ==
Upon the death of his father, Aredius returned to the Limousin to care for his mother. Entrusting to her the management of his estates, he lived for a time as a hermit in a cave. He founded, between 564 and 572, the monastery of Attane on the land of his inherited estate, located on the rivers Loue and Couchou in Haute-Vienne. He was the first abbot of the monastery, and the earliest monks were members of his own household. Gregory of Tours says that the house followed the rule of Saint John Cassian and later incorporated some aspects of the rule of Saint Basil of Caesarea. Later, other monks joined them. The site of the monastery was to give rise to the city of Saint-Yrieix-la-Perche.

Aredius divided his time between agricultural labor and study. He was known for his evangelical journeys throughout Gaul. He founded monasteries in Vigeois and Excideuil in Périgord and went on pilgrimages, always on foot. Every year he made a pilgrimage to Tours to celebrate the feast of Saint Martin of Tours. He would also travel annually to the Holy Cross Abbey in Poitiers to visit Queen Radegund. He supported the cult of Medardus of Soissons and probably built the church in his honour at Excideuil. Aredius built several churches in honour of saints whose relics he had collected.

== Hagiography and relics ==
Miracle stories began to be associated with him. People in the area believed him to have the gift of healing. His hagiographer, Gregory of Tours, says they crowded to Aredius "like bees to a hive". On more than one occasion, he intervened with the Merovingian princes on behalf of the people regarding oppressive taxes.

He was a friend of Gregory of Tours who wrote the most well-known accounts of Aredius' life. Gregory included Aredius in three of his works Historiae (sometimes known as Historia Francorum, 'History of the Franks'), Lives of the Fathers and Glories of the Martyrs. Aredius bequeathed his wealth to, among other beneficiaries, the church of St Martin of Tours.

The town of Saint-Yrieix-La-Perche has requested that the Metropolitan Museum of Art in New York return a reliquary of Aredius, which the town maintains was illegally purchased in 1906.
