= Roman Catholic Diocese of Uzès =

Coordinates: 44.01°N 4.42°E

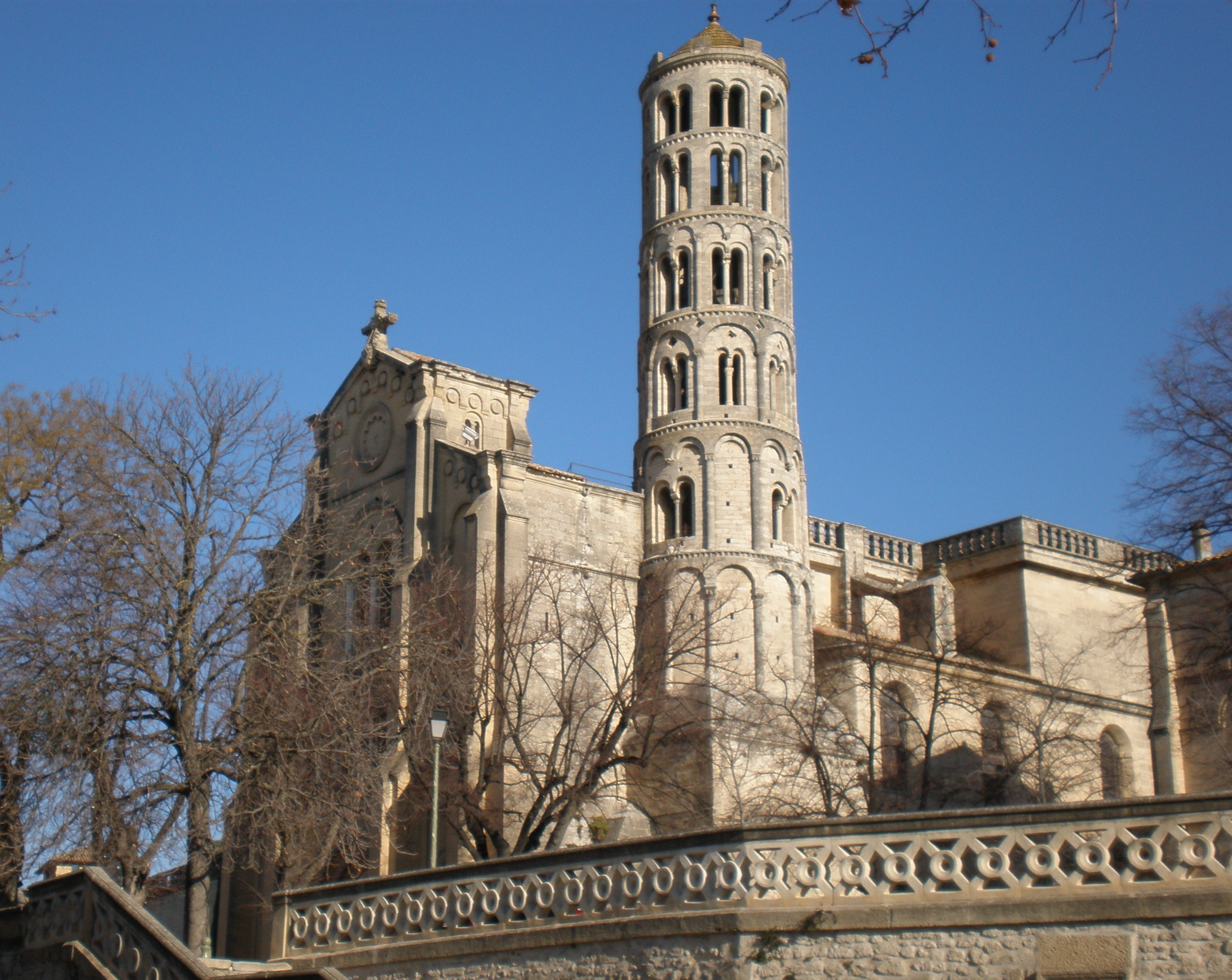
Uzès Cathedral

The Ancient Diocese of Uzès (Lat.: Uceticensis) is a former Roman Catholic diocese in France. From the arrival of Christianity in the 5th century until the French Revolution the southern French city of Uzès, in the department of Gard, was the seat of a bishop, a competitor to the local lords.

== History ==
The first reliably documented Bishop of Uzès was Constantius, who was present at the Council of Vaison in 442. Other notable bishops were the fourth, Saint Firminus (541–53), who is locally venerated as Saint Firmin and whose remains are kept in Uzès Cathedral. The cathedral is dedicated to Saint Theodoritus (Saint Théodorit) priest of Antioch, martyr, and patron saint of the town, and who was invoked against plague. Also honored is Saint Ferreol (553–81).

In the eighth century, Saracen occupation of the town resulted in the destruction of all the Christian structures. Under Charlemagne, who liberated Uzès, the territory was organized into a county. The count of Uzès freed the bishop from his military obligations. The counts, however, were dependent upon the counts of Toulouse, who in 1065 managed to place one of their nephews in Uzès; eventually Uzès lost the title of count and became a seignory of Toulouse.

On 15 October 879, Bishop Walefridus of Uzès participated in the election of Boso of Provence, the son of Bivin of Gorze, count of Lotharingia, and Richildis, the daughter of Boso the Elder, as King of Provence.

In 1177, the Albigensians, who entirely rejected the idea of a church hierarchy, entered Uzès, destroyed the cathedral, the church of Ss. Peter and Paul, the church of S. Jean, and the church of the monastery of Saint-Ferreol.

As the power of territorial magnates dispersed, the bishops obtained the right to strike coinage. The date of the beginning of coinage by the bishops is unknown, but the privilege was confirmed by Louis the Younger in 1156, and again by Philip II in 1211. In the 13th century, at the height of the see's power, the bishop was able to purchase a part of the signory of Uzès. Prior Guillaume de Grimoard held office as vicar-general of the bishop of Uzès, from 1357 to 1362, before becoming Pope Urban V.

=== Huguenots ===
Like many cloth-manufacturing centers (Uzès manufactures serge), the city and the surrounding countryside were strongly Protestant during the Wars of Religion in the 16th century, which wreaked havoc in the Languedoc regions, and Bishop Jean de Saint Gelais (1531–60) became a Calvinist. Many of the city's churches were burned by Huguenots and only two remained.

The Capuchins first established a house in Uzès in 1605, and by 1635, with help from the duke of Uzès, they built a church and a convent.

The missionary Jacques Bridaine (1701–67) was a native of the village of Chusclan in the diocese of Uzès. Even before he was ordained a priest, he was commissioned by Bishop Michel Poncet de la Rivière of Uzès to preach in Vers, then in Saint-Quentin. His mission was to bring back Catholicism to an area which had been Huguenot for a century.

=== French Revolution ===
The diocese of Uzès was a suffragan of the archdiocese of Narbonne. The diocese had two religious houses, one for men, the Cluniac Pont-Saint Esprit; the other for women, the Cistercian Valsauve-de-Bagnols. Both were closed during the French revolution, their members releaste from their vows by governmental order and pensioned off, the properties appropriated by the government. The Chapter of the cathedral was also dissolved.

For seventy days, from February to April 1813, the city of Uzès was the enforced residence of Cardinal Bartolomeo Pacca, the pro-Secretary of State of Pope Pius VII. He had been deported from Rome along with Pope Pius VII when Napoleon annexed the Papal States to France. After his confinement at Fenestrelle (1812–1813), he was permitted to visit Pius at Fontainebleau, before being sent under guard to Uzès.

The bishopric of Nîmes was re-established as a separate diocese in 1821.

A Papal Brief of 27 April 1877, granted to its bishop the right to add the titles Alais and Uzès to Nîmes, with the territory of the two suppressed dioceses combined with that of Nîmes.

== Bishops of Uzès ==
=== To 1150 ===
- 419?–462 Constantius
- 506 : Probatius

[Roricius]

- 538–553 : Firminus
- 553–581 : Ferreolus
- 581 : Albinus

[581] : Jovinus usurper

- 581 : Marcellus

...

- 659 : Aurelien (Aurele)
- 661 : Mummolus

...

- 773 : Sigibert (Sigepert, Sigisbert)
- 791 : Arimundus (Arimond)
- 823–835 : Amelius I.
- 841 : Éliphas
- 858–879 : Walafrid
- 885 : Asaël
- c.886–c.915 : Amelius (II).

...

- 945 : Rostagnus

...

- 994–c.1030 : Heribaldus

...

- 1030–after 1066 : Hugues (Hugo)

...

- 1096–1138 : Raymond (I.)
- 1139–1150 : Ébrard (I.) (Éverard)

=== From 1150 to 1400 ===
- 1150–1188 : Raymond de Posquières
- 1188–1190 : Bertrand (I.)
- 1190–1204 : Guillaume de Vénéjan
- 1203–1207 : Ébrard (II.)
- 1208–1212 : Raymond
- 1212–1227 : Raymond (IV)
- 1228–1239 : Berlio
- 1240–1249 : Pons de Becmil
- 1249–1285 : Bertrand Armand
- 1285–1308 : Guillaume des Gardies

Sede vacante (1308–1314)

- 1314–1318 : André de Frédol, O.S.A.
- 1318–1344 : Guillaume de Mandagout
- 1344–1346 : Élias (Hélias de Saint-Yrieix)
- 1357–1365 : Pierre d'Aigrefeuille
- 1365–1366 : Pierre (II.) (Gérard de la Rovère)
- 1366–1371 : Bonuspar (Bompar)
- 1371–1374 : Bernard de Saint-Étienne
- 1374–1398 : Martial

=== From 1400 to 1801 ===
- 1400–1405 : Pierre de Beaublé (Belbladi)
- 1405–1426 : Géraud de Breuil (Guiraud de Broglio)

[1426 : Pierre Soybert]

- 1427–1441 : Bertrand de Cadoène
- 1441–1442 : Guillaume de Champeaux
- 1442–1445 : Alain de Coëtivy Administrator
- 1445–1446 : Guillaume Soybert
- 1446–1448 : Olivier du Châtel
- 1448–1463 : Gabriel du Châtel
- 1463–1483 : Jean de Mareuil
- 1483–1503 : Nicolas Malgras (Maugras, Malgrassi)
- 1503–1531 : Jacques de Saint-Gelais
- 1531–1570 : Jean de Saint-Gelais
- 1570–1591 : Robert de Girard
- 1591–1601 : François Rousset
- 1601–1624 : Louis de Vigne
- 1621–1633 : Paul-Antoine de Fay de Peraut
- 1633–1660 : Nicolas de Grillié (de Grillet)
- 1660–1674 : Jacques Adhémar de Monteil de Grignan
- 1674–1677 : Michel Phélypeaux de la Vrillière
- 1677–1728 : Michel Poncet de la Rivière
- 1728–1736 : François de Lastic de Saint-Jal
- 1737–1779 : Bonaventure Baüyn
- 1779–1801 : Henri Benoît Jules de Béthizy de Mézières

== See also ==
- Catholic Church in France
- List of Catholic dioceses in France

== Bibliography ==
=== Sources: Episcopal lists ===
- Gams, Pius Bonifatius (1873). Series episcoporum Ecclesiae catholicae: quotquot innotuerunt a beato Petro apostolo (in Latin). Ratisbon: Typis et Sumptibus Georgii Josephi Manz. pp. 548–549. (Use with caution; obsolete)
- Eubel, Conradus, ed. (1913). Hierarchia catholica (in Latin). Vol. 1 (second ed.). Münster: Libreria Regensbergiana.
- Eubel, Conradus, ed. (1914). Hierarchia catholica (in Latin). Vol. 2 (second ed.). Münster: Libreria Regensbergiana.
- Eubel, Conradus; Gulik, Guilelmus, eds. (1923). Hierarchia catholica (in Latin). Vol. 3 (second ed.). Münster: Libreria Regensbergiana.
- Gauchat, Patritius (Patrice) (1935). Hierarchia catholica (in Latin). Vol. IV (1592-1667). Münster: Libraria Regensbergiana.
- Ritzler, Remigius; Sefrin, Pirminus (1952). Hierarchia catholica medii et recentis aevi (in Latin). Vol. V (1667-1730). Patavii: Messagero di S. Antonio.
- Ritzler, Remigius; Sefrin, Pirminus (1958). Hierarchia catholica medii et recentis aevi. Vol. VI (1730-1799). Patavii: Messagero di S. Antonio.

=== Studies ===
- Congregation of St. Maur, O.S.B. (edd.) (1739. Gallia Christiana, In Provincias Ecclesiasticas Distributa. (in Latin). Tomus Sextus, Volume 6. Paris: Typographia regia, 1739. [pp. 609–663; "Instrumenta", pp. 293–312].
- Albiousse, Lionel d' (1903). Histoire de la ville d'Uzès. (in French). Uzès: H. Malige, 1903.
- Charvet, Gratien (1870). La première maison d'Uzès, étude historique et généalogique de la première maison d'Uzès suivi du catalogue analytique des évêques d'Uzès. (in French). Alais: J. Martin 1870.
- Devic, Claude; Vaissete, J. (1872). Histoire générale de Languedoc: avec des notes et les pièces justificatives. (in French and Latin). Volume 4. Toulouse: E. Privat, 1872. [chronological annotated list, pp. 298–304; 864-870].
- Duchesne, Louis (1907). Fastes épiscopaux de l'ancienne Gaule (in French). Vol. Tome I: Provinces du Sud-Est (deuxieme ed.). Paris: A. Fontemoing. pp. 314–316.
- Jean, Armand (1891). Les évêques et les archevêques de France depuis 1682 jusqu'à 1801 (in French). Paris: A. Picard. p. 520.
- Pisani, Paul (1907). Répertoire biographique de l'épiscopat constitutionnel (1791-1802) (in French). Paris: A. Picard et fils.

=== External links ===
- Image of cathedral.
- Uzès Cathedral
- St. Theodoritus
