= Uzès =

Uzès Usès (Occitan)
- Commune
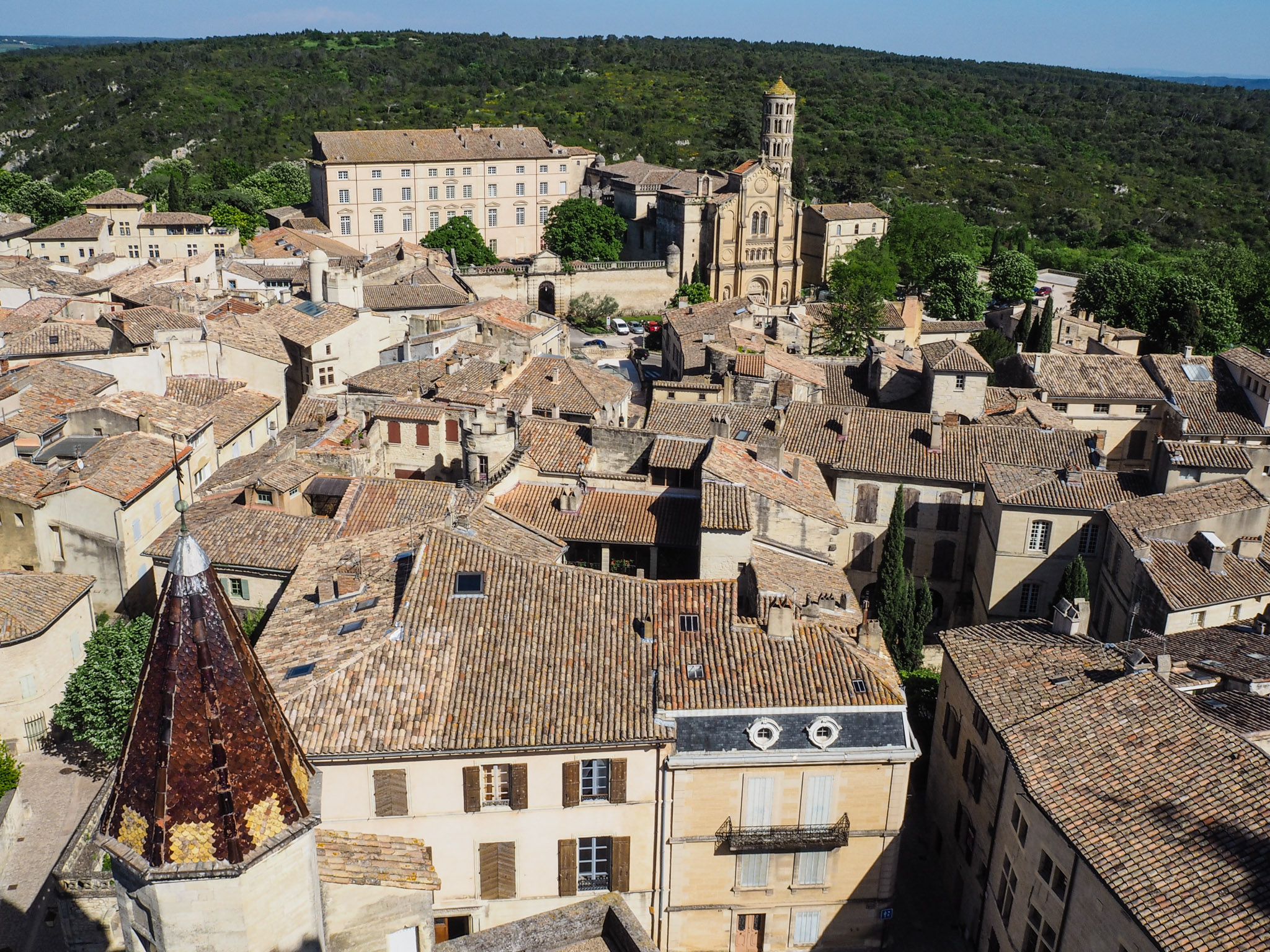
- View of part of the town centre with Saint-Théodorit Cathedral and Fenestrelle Tower

- Coat of arms
- Location of Uzès
- Location within France Location within Occitanie
- Coordinates: 44°00′47″N 4°25′14″E
- Country: France
- Region: Occitania
- Department: Gard
- Arrondissement: Nîmes
- Canton: Uzès

Government
  - Mayor (2020–2026): Jean-Luc Chapon
- Area^{1}: 25.41 km^{2} (9.81 sq mi)
- Elevation: 167 m (548 ft)
- Highest elevation: 274 m (899 ft)
- Lowest elevation: 49 m (161 ft)
- Population (2023): 8,519
  - Density: 335.3/km^{2} (868.3/sq mi)
- Time zone: UTC+01:00 (CET)
  - Summer (DST): UTC+02:00 (CEST)
- INSEE/Postal code: 30334 /30700
- ^{1} French Land Register data, which excludes lakes, ponds, glaciers > 1 km^{2} (0.386 sq mi or 247 acres) and river estuaries.

Uzès (French pronunciation: [y.zɛs]; Occitan: Usès) is a commune in the Gard department in the Occitanie region of Southern France. Uzès lies about 25 kilometres (16 miles) north-northeast of Nîmes, 40 kilometres (25 miles) west of Avignon, and 32 kilometres (20 miles) southeast of Alès.

== History ==
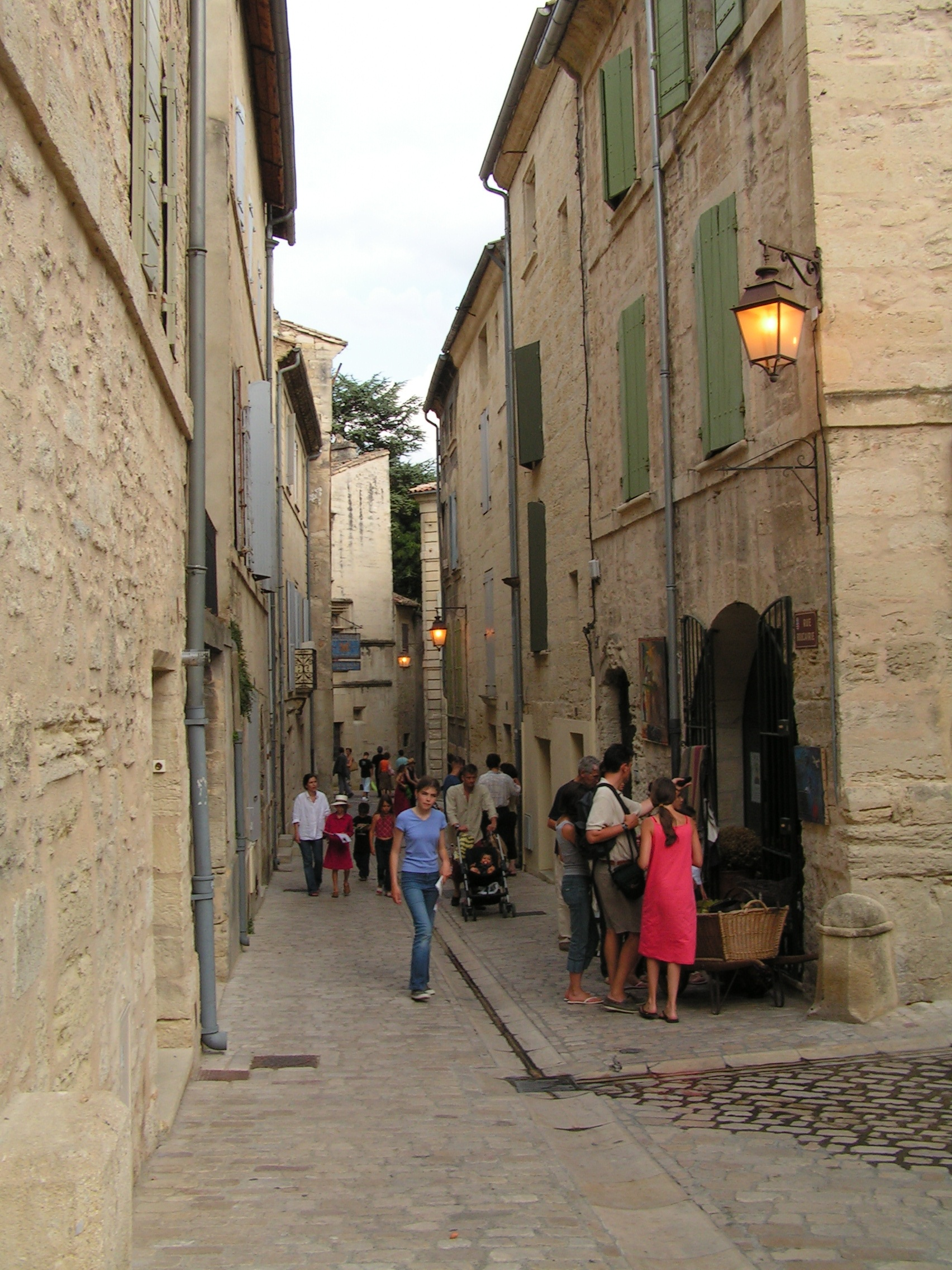
Old town

Originally Ucetia or Eutica in Latin, Uzès was a small Gallo-Roman oppidum, or administrative settlement. The town lies at the source of the Alzon river, at Fontaine d'Eure, from where a Roman aqueduct was built in the first century AD, to supply water to the city of Nîmes, 50 kilometres (31 miles) away. The most famous stretch of the aqueduct is the Pont du Gard, now a UNESCO World Heritage Site, which carried fresh water over splendid arches across the Gardon river.

Jews were apparently settled there as early as the 5th century. Saint Ferréol, Bishop of Uzès, was said to have admitted them to his table. Complaints were made of him to King Childebert I for this issue, whereupon the bishop was required to turn against them, expelling those Jews from Uzès who would not convert to Christianity. After his death (581), many of the converts who had been baptised returned to Judaism. In 614 the Christian government expelled Jews from the region.

In early 8th century, Uzès was a fortified civitas and bishopric under the Archbishop of Narbonne. During the Umayyad conquest of Gothic Septimania, Uzès became the northernmost stronghold of Muslim Spain circa 725. Charles Martel laid siege to the stronghold in 736, but it remained in Gothic-Andalusian hands up to 752. That year counts loyal to Ansemund of Nîmes ceded numerous of strongholds to the Frankish Pepin the Short. In 753 the stronghold rebelled against the Franks after Ansemund's assassination, but the uprising was suppressed and a Frankish trustee of Pepin imposed.

In the 13th century, Uzès hosted a small community of Jewish scholars, as well as a community of Cathars.

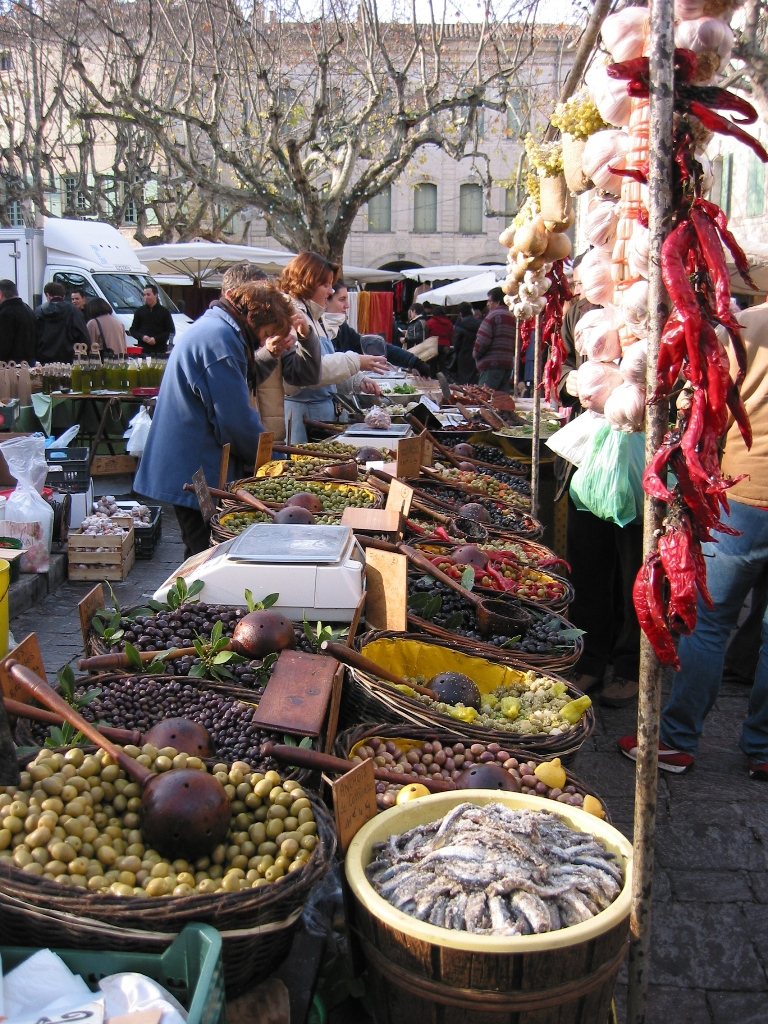
Farmers market

Like many cloth-manufacturing centers (Uzès was known for its serges), residents of the city and the surrounding countryside had become strongly Protestant during the 16th century, and religious and class conflicts played out in the Wars of Religion. The Languedoc region suffered considerable violence: Protestants trashed and burned many of the city's churches. Only two have survived to the 21st century. Saint-Étienne was reconstructed after the violence.

=== Ucetia ===
Ucetia is the name of a Gallo-Roman oppidum in the Roman province of Occitania. Its existence was recorded on a list of eleven other settlements on a stela in Nîmes (ancient Nemausus) on which its name appears as "VCETIAE". It was under the administration of Nemausus, to which it provided water via a Roman aqueduct. Ucetia was also known as Castrum Uceciense, which is in the Notitia of the provinces of Gallia.

In 2017, Roman mosaics were discovered by accident during construction at a local high school, and represented material proof of Ucetia. The mosaics had depictions of animals such as a deer, an owl, an eagle, and bulls. These have been identified as "honor to the Roman gods". For many European cultures, deer represented deities of the woodlands, and the owl was a symbol of the goddess Athena. Together with the animals, decorations represented water, geometric shapes, colors, and patterns, including a design with ancient swastika-like elements.

Ucetia was inhabited from at least the 1st century B.C. until the 7th century A.D.

==== Ucetia and Pont du Gard ====
Ucetia was known to have been a source of water carried via aqueduct to many communities, especially ancient Nemausus (Nîmes), which grew to a population of about 30,000. The aqueduct system included the Pont du Gard. Construction of the aqueduct led to a "classic Roman tragedy" of greed in the nearby cities and towns that affected Ucetia and other communities.

=== Second World War ===
From September 1940 to 9 November 1942, PC Cadix operated at Château des Fouzes near Uzès, in Vichy France. It was a cryptographer team organized by French major Gustave Bertrand, comprising 15 Polish men from the Polish Cipher Bureau, 9 Frenchmen and 7 Republican Spanish refugees. From there, they worked against Axis ciphers including the Enigma machine.

== Geography ==
=== Climate ===
Uzès has a hot-summer Mediterranean climate (Köppen climate classification Csa). The average annual temperature in Uzès is 14.5 °C (58.1 °F). The average annual rainfall is 809.4 mm (31.87 in) with November as the wettest month. The temperatures are highest on average in July, at around 23.7 °C (74.7 °F), and lowest in January, at around 6.1 °C (43.0 °F). The highest temperature ever recorded in Uzès was 43.9 °C (111.0 °F) on 28 June 2019; the coldest temperature ever recorded was −12.1 °C (10.2 °F) on 2 March 2005.

Climate data for Uzès (1991−2020 normals, extremes 2002−present)
| Month | Jan | Feb | Mar | Apr | May | Jun | Jul | Aug | Sep | Oct | Nov | Dec | Year |
|---|---|---|---|---|---|---|---|---|---|---|---|---|---|
| Record high °C (°F) | 21.7 (71.1) | 24.2 (75.6) | 26.9 (80.4) | 30.9 (87.6) | 33.6 (92.5) | 43.9 (111.0) | 39.9 (103.8) | 41.5 (106.7) | 37.2 (99.0) | 31.4 (88.5) | 24.8 (76.6) | 20.4 (68.7) | 43.9 (111.0) |
| Mean daily maximum °C (°F) | 11.4 (52.5) | 12.6 (54.7) | 16.7 (62.1) | 20.2 (68.4) | 23.8 (74.8) | 29.3 (84.7) | 32.0 (89.6) | 31.4 (88.5) | 26.7 (80.1) | 21.3 (70.3) | 15.6 (60.1) | 11.9 (53.4) | 21.1 (70.0) |
| Daily mean °C (°F) | 6.1 (43.0) | 6.9 (44.4) | 10.0 (50.0) | 13.3 (55.9) | 16.8 (62.2) | 21.4 (70.5) | 23.7 (74.7) | 23.3 (73.9) | 19.5 (67.1) | 15.4 (59.7) | 10.4 (50.7) | 6.9 (44.4) | 14.5 (58.1) |
| Mean daily minimum °C (°F) | 0.9 (33.6) | 1.2 (34.2) | 3.3 (37.9) | 6.4 (43.5) | 9.7 (49.5) | 13.5 (56.3) | 15.5 (59.9) | 15.2 (59.4) | 12.2 (54.0) | 9.4 (48.9) | 5.3 (41.5) | 1.9 (35.4) | 7.9 (46.2) |
| Record low °C (°F) | −8.6 (16.5) | −11.5 (11.3) | −12.1 (10.2) | −4.6 (23.7) | 0.9 (33.6) | 5.1 (41.2) | 8.2 (46.8) | 7.2 (45.0) | 2.3 (36.1) | −1.5 (29.3) | −6.3 (20.7) | −9.5 (14.9) | −12.1 (10.2) |
| Average precipitation mm (inches) | 57.2 (2.25) | 42.8 (1.69) | 55.8 (2.20) | 70.9 (2.79) | 60.6 (2.39) | 37.0 (1.46) | 32.9 (1.30) | 49.9 (1.96) | 110.0 (4.33) | 114.3 (4.50) | 121.7 (4.79) | 56.3 (2.22) | 809.4 (31.87) |
| Average precipitation days (≥ 1.0 mm) | 6.3 | 5.0 | 5.4 | 7.2 | 6.5 | 4.2 | 3.5 | 4.0 | 4.6 | 6.6 | 8.0 | 5.7 | 66.9 |
Source: Météo-France

== Dukes of Uzès ==
The title of Duke of Uzès, in the Crussol family, is the premier title in the peerage of France, coming right after the princes of the blood. The title of seigneur d'Uzès is attested in a charter of 1088. After part of Languedoc was attached to royal demesne (1229), the lords' (and later dukes') military skill and fealty to the Crown propelled their rise through the nobility, until, after the treason of the last Duke of Montmorency, beheaded in 1632, the title of First Duke of France fell to Uzès, who retain their stronghold in the center of town today, which has expanded round the 11th century Tour Bermond. If France were a kingdom, it would be the job of the duke of Uzès to cry out, "Le Roi est mort. Vive le Roi!" at each state funeral, and defend the honour of the queen mother. Twenty-one dukes have been wounded or killed as hereditary Champion of France over the centuries.

== Sights ==
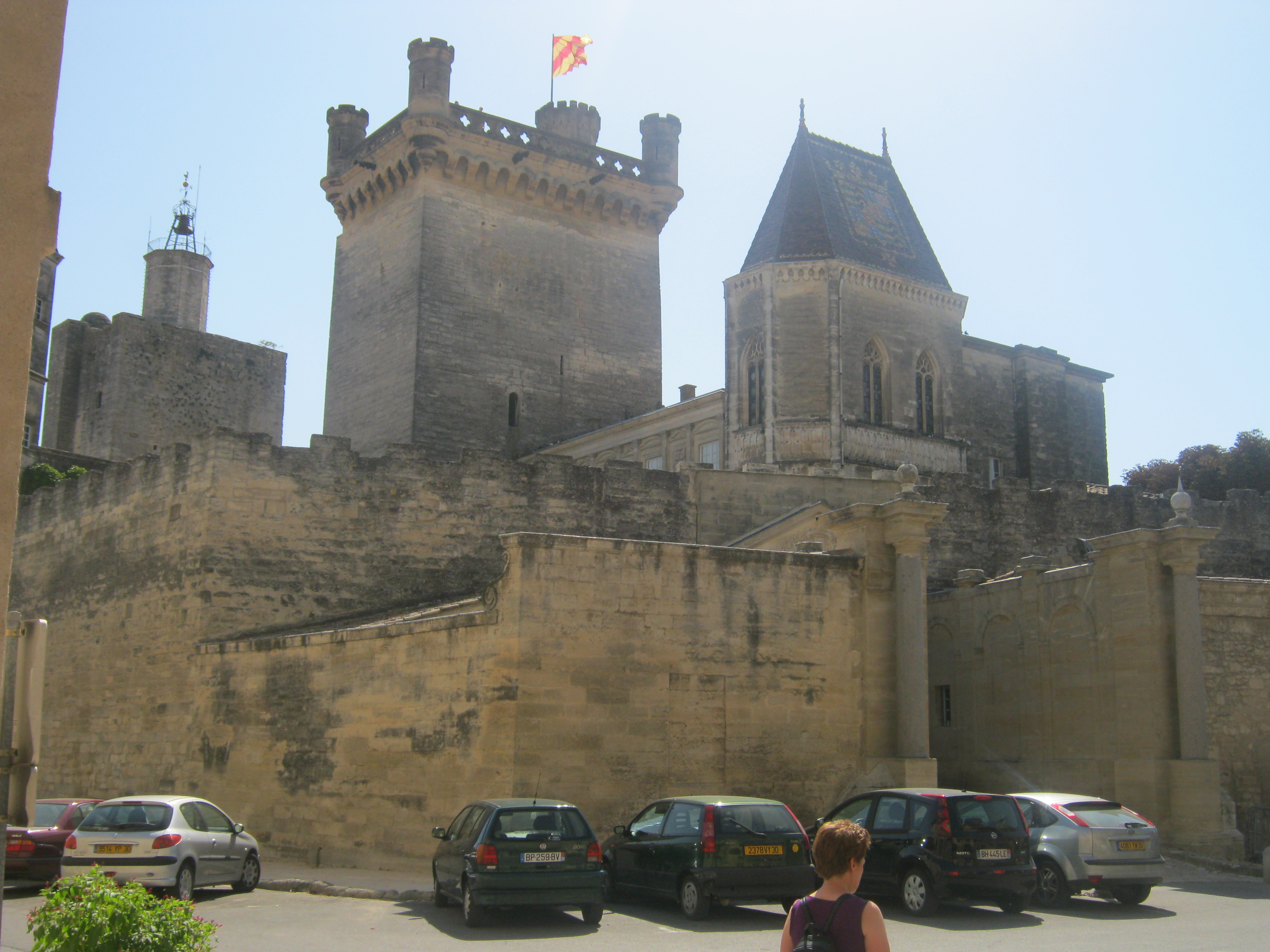
Duché Palace

The present-day city retains the trace of its walls as a circuit of boulevards. A Capuchin chapel, built in 1635 to house the mortal remains of the dukes, occupies the site of a 1st-century AD temple dedicated to the first Roman Emperor, Augustus. There are monuments of the prestige of the former bishopric, once one of the most extensive of Languedoc, but extinguished at the Revolution, and private houses that witness the wealth that the textile trade brought in the 16th century. The town is also home to three feudal towers, the Bermonde Tower (part of the château du Duché), the Bishop Tower and the Royal Tower.

Uzès Cathedral was destroyed in the Albigensian Crusade, rebuilt, and destroyed again in the 16th century Wars of Religion. Rebuilt again in the 17th century, it was stripped out during the French Revolution. The 11th century Romanesque Tour Fenestrelle ("Window Tower"), with its paired windows, is probably the most famous icon of the city. It was listed as a French Historical Monument in 1862.

Uzès is locally famous for its Saturday market. The market offers local produce, but it also boasts textiles made in the region and many tourist delights.

== Economy ==
Tourism is one of the key industrial sectors, alongside the local arts scene and wine making.

The region has a long history in the production of licorice. The German company Haribo maintains a factory and museum in Uzès, which traces its roots back to the licorice factory Henri Lefont opened there in 1862. His company later merged with Ricqlès, and was then taken over by Haribo.

== Population ==
Historical population

| Year | Pop. | ±% p.a. |
|---|---|---|
| 1793 | 6,150 | — |
| 1800 | 6,350 | +0.46% |
| 1806 | 6,287 | −0.17% |
| 1821 | 5,684 | −0.67% |
| 1831 | 6,162 | +0.81% |
| 1836 | 6,856 | +2.16% |
| 1841 | 7,274 | +1.19% |
| 1846 | 7,215 | −0.16% |
| 1851 | 6,934 | −0.79% |
| 1856 | 6,333 | −1.80% |
| 1861 | 6,242 | −0.29% |
| 1866 | 5,895 | −1.14% |
| 1872 | 5,574 | −0.93% |
| 1876 | 5,585 | +0.05% |
| 1881 | 5,449 | −0.49% |
| 1886 | 5,146 | −1.14% |
| 1891 | 4,989 | −0.62% |
| 1896 | 4,819 | −0.69% |
| 1901 | 4,889 | +0.29% |

| Year | Pop. | ±% p.a. |
|---|---|---|
| 1906 | 5,182 | +1.17% |
| 1911 | 4,804 | −1.50% |
| 1921 | 4,098 | −1.58% |
| 1926 | 4,456 | +1.69% |
| 1931 | 4,212 | −1.12% |
| 1936 | 4,033 | −0.86% |
| 1946 | 4,667 | +1.47% |
| 1954 | 5,222 | +1.41% |
| 1962 | 5,649 | +0.99% |
| 1968 | 6,851 | +3.27% |
| 1975 | 7,078 | +0.47% |
| 1982 | 7,525 | +0.88% |
| 1990 | 7,649 | +0.20% |
| 1999 | 8,007 | +0.51% |
| 2007 | 8,088 | +0.13% |
| 2012 | 8,578 | +1.18% |
| 2017 | 8,454 | −0.29% |
| 2023 | 8,519 | +0.13% |

Source: EHESS and INSEE (1968-2023)

== Notable people ==
- Firmin Abauzit (1679–1767), scholar who worked on physics, theology and philosophy
- Vice-Admiral François-Paul Brueys D'Aigalliers, Count de Brueys, (1753–1798), the French commander in the Battle of the Nile.
- Oliver Bevan (1941–) English artist
- Leon Krier, urbanist
- Dhuoda, duchess consort of Septimania and writer of the Liber Manualis
- Bernard Plantapilosa, Count of Auvergne and second son of Dhuoda
- David Redfern (1936–2014) English music photographer
- Suzanne Verdier (1745–1813), writer
- Frédéric Gabillon (1976–), racing driver
- Roland Bervillé (1966–), racing driver

== See also ==
- Bishopric of Uzès
- Viscounts and Dukes of Uzès
- Philip O'Connor
- Communes of the Gard department
