= Ferréol of Uzès =

Saint Ferréol (Ferreolus) of Uzès
- Born: unknown Narbonne
- Died: 581
- Venerated in: Orthodox Church; Roman Catholicism
- Feast: January 4

Saint Ferréol (Ferreolus) of Uzès (530 – January 4, 581 AD) was bishop of Uzès and possibly bishop of Nîmes (Catholic Encyclopedia "Nîmes") (553-581). His Feast Day is January 4.

He was born in Narbonne, apparently a grandson of Cloderic of the Ripuarian Franks. Bishops in Merovingian Gaul were ordinarily drawn from the highest levels of society. Ferréol founded a Benedictine abbey, for which he wrote a rule that survives; it regards the work of transcription in the scriptorium as the equivalent of manual labor, since it charges that the monk "who does not turn up the earth with the plow ought to write the parchment with his fingers." As bishop of Uzès, Ferréol devoted himself in particular to converting the Jews within his diocese.

Under Childebert I Ferréol was banished from his see in 555, for having lived in too friendly relations with the Jews of Septimania. The thoroughly Romanized region had until recently been ruled by a Visigothic and Arian upper class, and relaxed relations with the long-established and urbane Jewish community was a Visigoth tradition. Ferréol's motive lay in hopes of making conversions, according to the Vita Ferreoli, apud Marcus Antonius Dominicy, Ausberti Familia Rediviva, published in Paris, 1648 (Jewish Encyclopedia).

He was restored to his see after three years (Benedictine Encyclopedia), but now had to toe the strict Merovingian line: "Ferréol ordered the Jews of his diocese to meet in the Church of St Theodoric, and preached to them a baptismal sermon. Some Jews abjured their faith; he forbade the others to remain in the city, and expelled them from his diocese" in 558 (Jewish Encyclopedia).

Ferréol makes a brief appearance in the phantasmic parade of Episode 12 ("Cyclops") in James Joyce's Ulysses.

His sister Saint Tarsicia of Rodez (died ca 600) lived as a hermit in the Rouergue near Rodez, where she is still venerated by the Benedictines, with a feast day of January 15. She was said in error to have been a granddaughter of Clotaire II, and more accurately a granddaughter of Clotaire I and, less likely, of St. Radegunda (Catholic Encyclopedia "Rodez"). Thus, they were two among numerous members of the Merovingian royal house whose posthumous veneration was encouraged by the Catholic Church.

An earlier, legendary St. Ferreolus (Saint Ferréol) was sent to evangelize in Besançon in the late 2nd century. In 1320, the chanter of Notre-Dame de Paris, Hugues de Besançon, founded a chaplaincy "in honor of Saints Ferréol and Ferrutien" at the altar of one of the recently completed chapels .
