= Theodore of Marseille =

Theodore (Latin: Theodorus) was the bishop of Marseille from at least 566 until 591/594. In the 580s, Theodore was at the centre of a dispute over the city of Marseille between King Guntram and his nephew, King Childebert II. He was arrested several times. His troubles are recorded by the contemporary historian Gregory of Tours, who depicts him as a saintly albeit powerless figure who was supported by the laity, but opposed by his own clergy.

Venantius Fortunatus, in a poem of 566, asks Dynamius of Marseille to greet his bishop, Theodore, and his metropolitan, Sapaudus of Arles. The city of Marseille was at the time the most important Mediterranean port in Merovingian Francia.

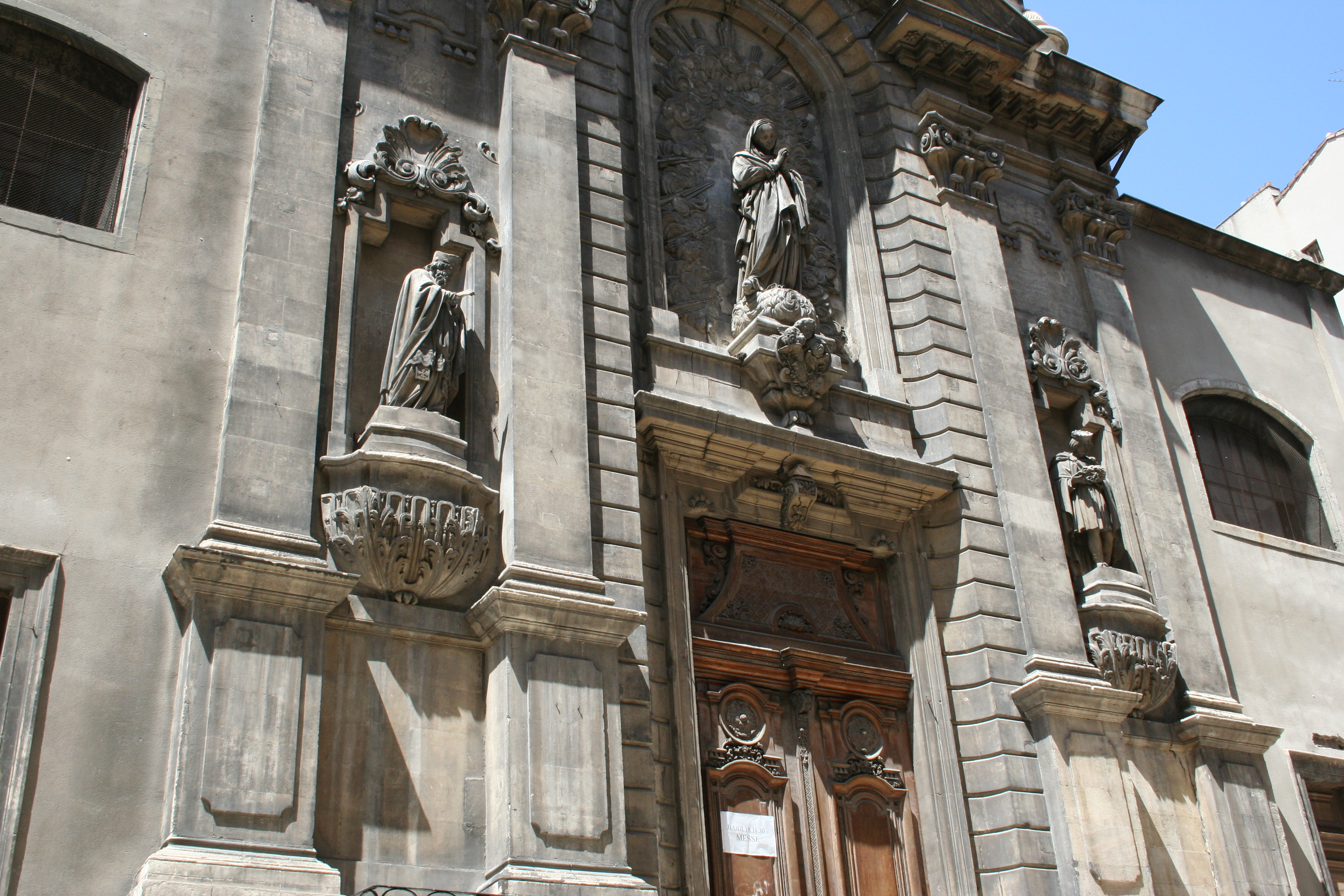
The façade of Église Saint-Théodore in Marseille. Theodore is the statue on the left.

In 581, while he was on his way to Childebert's court, Theodore was arrested by Dynamius, then governor of Provence. The former governor, Jovinus, was arrested at the same time. The clergy of Marseille, immediately acted as if he was dead. The charges against him, which are unknown, were eventually dropped and he was escorted back to the city by Duke Gundulf, one of Childebert's men. Dynamius then accused of him of plotting against Guntram and again had him arrested. He was sent to Guntram, but the charges were dropped a second time and he was released.

In 582, the Merovingian claimant Gundovald landed in Marseille to make a bid for a throne with Byzantine backing. He was formally greeted by Theodore, who was consequently arrested by Guntram Boso on charges of treason. He claimed to have been acting on the orders of Childebert. Acquitted before Guntram, he nonetheless remained in prison for some time.

Theodore was back in Marseille by 585, when Guntram accused him of responsibility for the assassination of King Chilperic I the previous year. Childebert had his duke, Rathar, arrest Theodore and send him to Guntram, who intended to have him exiled. Guntram and Childebert jointly convoked a synod at Troyes, but the bishops of the latter's kingdom refused to attend because of the planned prosecution of Theodore, which Childebert was also said to have opposed. Later in 585, Theodore attended the synod at Mâcon convoked by Guntram to discuss his case. When Guntram fell ill, Theodore was released.

In June 591, Theodore and Bishop Virgilius of Arles received a letter from Pope Gregory I informing them that "very many ... of the Jewish religion ... from time to time traveling for various matters of business to the regions of Marseilles, have apprized us that many of the Jews settled in those parts have been brought to the font of baptism more by force than by preaching." The pope ordered Theodore and Virgilius to put a stop to the forced baptism of Jews.

The diocese of Marseille remembers Theodore as a saint, keeping his feast on 3 February. His listed under 2 January in the revised Roman Martyrology of 2004, but is not listed in the General Roman Calendar.

== Sources ==
- Duchesne, Louis (1907). Fastes épiscopaux de l'ancienne Gaule. Vol. 1: Provinces du Sud-Est (2nd ed.). Paris: Fontemoing.
- Halfond, Gregory I. (2010). The Archaeology of Frankish Church Councils, AD 511–768. Leiden: Brill.
- Marcus, Jacob R., ed. (1938). The Jew in the Medieval World: A Source Book (315–1791). Atheneum, NY: Temple.
- Rey, Gonzague de [in French] (1885). Les saints de l'église de Marseille. Marseille: Société Anonyme de l'Imprimerie Marseillaise.
- Watkins, Basil (2016). The Book of Saints: A Comprehensive Biographical Dictionary (8th rev. ed.). London and New York: Bloomsbury.
- Wood, Ian N. (1994). The Merovingian Kingdoms, 450–751. Harlow: Longman.
