= Nicetius =

Bishop of Trier

Saint Nicetius of Trier
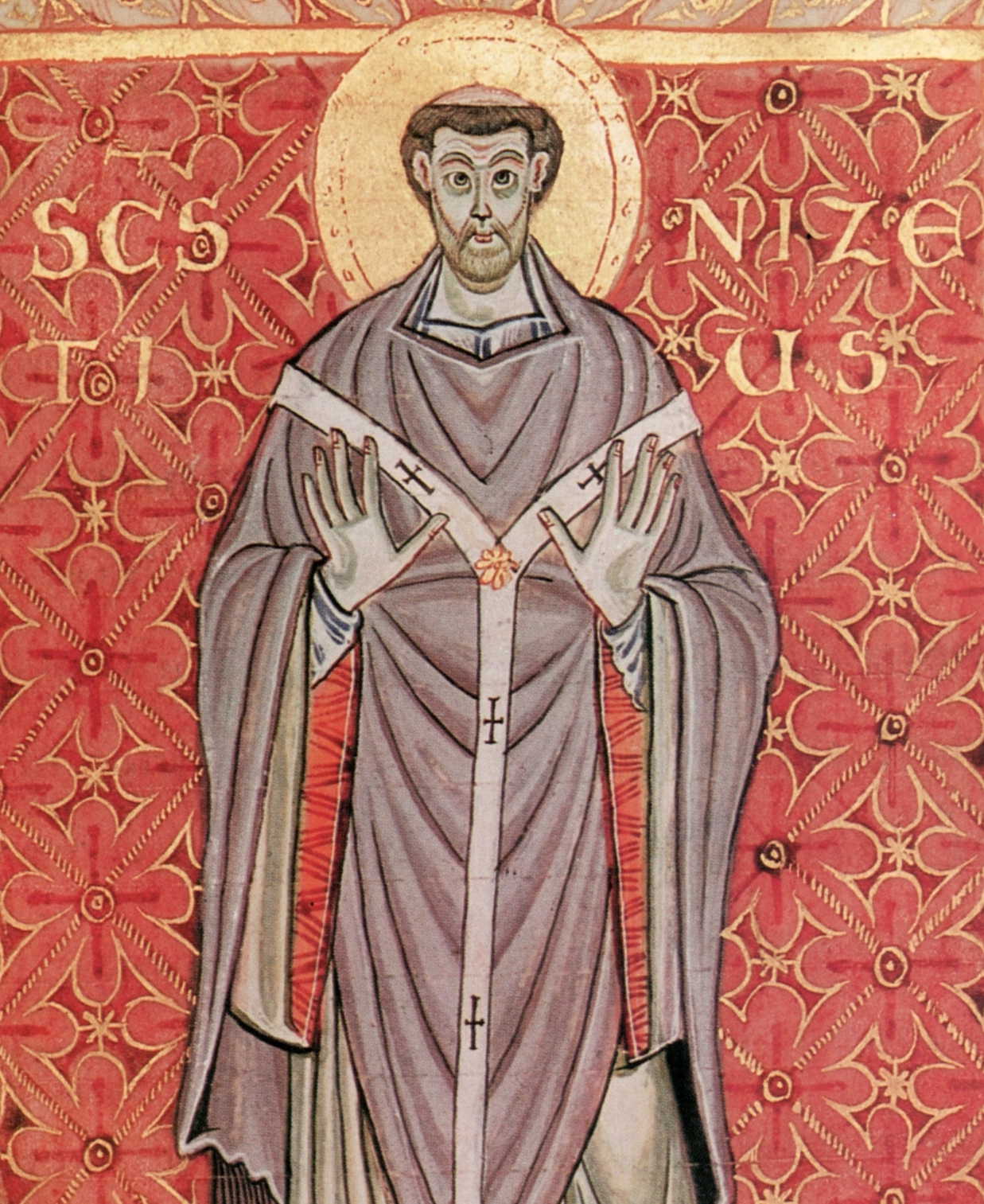
- Saint Nicetius, Egbert Psalter

Bishop of Trier
- Born: 513; Auvergne
- Died: ~566; Trier
- Venerated in: Catholic Church, Eastern Orthodox Church
- Feast: October 1 (in Trier); December 5 (Roman Martyrology)

Saint Nicetius (French: Saint Nizier) (c. 525 - c. 566) was a bishop of Trier, born in the latter part of the sixth century, exact date unknown; died in 563 or more probably 566.

Nicetius was the most important bishop of the ancient see of Trier, in the era when, after the disorders of the Migrations, Frankish supremacy began in what had been Roman Gaul. Considerable detail of the life of this zealous bishop is known from various sources, from letters written either by or to him, from two poems of Venantius Fortunatus and above all from the statements of his pupil Aredius, later Abbot of Limoges, which have been preserved by Gregory of Tours.

== Life ==
=== Pastoral work ===
Nicetius came from a Gallo-Roman family; he was a native of Aquitaine. From his youth he devoted himself to religious life and entered a monastery. Theuderic I (511-34) had encouraged clerics from Acquitaine to work in the Rhineland. The king came to esteem Nicetius despite his often remonstrating with him on his wrongdoing without, however, any loss of favour. After the death of Bishop Aprunculus of Trier, an embassy of the clergy and citizens of Trier came to the royal court to elect a new bishop. They desired Saint Gallus, but the king refused his consent. It was through Theuderic's patronage that Nicetius was confirmed as bishop. About 527 Nicetius set out as the new bishop for Trier, accompanied by an escort sent by the king, and while on the journey had opportunity to make known his firmness in the administration of his office.

Trier had suffered terribly during the disorders of the Migrations. One of the first cares of the new bishop was to rebuild the cathedral church, the restoration of which is mentioned by the poet Venantius Fortunatus. He imported Italian craftmen to work on churches. Archæological research has shown, in the cathedral of Trier, the existence of mason-work belonging to the Frankish period which may belong to this reconstruction by Nicetius. A fortified castle (castellum) with a chapel built by him on the river Moselle is also mentioned by the same poet. Bishop Nicetius replanted vineyards on the slopes above the Moselle, to restore the area's wine business.

The bishop devoted himself with great zeal to his pastoral duty. He preached daily, opposed vigorously the numerous evils in the moral life both of the higher classes and of the common people, and in so doing did not spare the king and his courtiers. Disregarding threats, he steadfastly fulfilled his duty. He excommunicated King Chlothar I (511-61), who for some time was sole ruler of the Frankish dominions, on account of his misdeeds; in return the king exiled the determined bishop in 560. The king died, however, in the following year, and his son and successor Sigebert I, the ruler of Austrasia (561-75), allowed Nicetius to return home. Nicetius took part in several synods of the Frankish bishops: the synod of Clermont (535), of Orléans (549), the second synod of Council of Clermont (549), the synod of Toul (550), at which he presided, and the synod of Synod of Paris (555).

=== Correspondence and personal life ===
Nicetius corresponded with ecclesiastical dignitaries of high rank in distant places. Letters are extant that were written to him by Abbot Florianus of Romain-Moûtier (Canton of Vaud, Switzerland), by Bishop Rufus of Octodurum (now Martigny, in the Canton of Valais, Switzerland), and by Archbishop Mappinius of Reims. He was an influential bishop in Gaul and attracted many clerics to Trier and Austrasia with the then young Venantius Fortunatus as his most famous clerical guest, writer and future bishop of Poitiers. Fortunatus' visit to Nicetius was his first major step in Gaul after he left the school of Ravenna.

The general interests of the Church did not escape his watchful care. He wrote an urgent letter to Emperor Justinian of Constantinople in regard to the emperor's position in the controversies arising from Monophysitism. Another letter that has been preserved is to Chlodoswinda, wife of the Lombard King Alboin, in which he exhorts this princess to do everything possible to bring her husband over to the Catholic faith.

In his personal life Nicetius was very ascetic and self-mortifying; he fasted frequently, and while the priests and clerics who lived with him were at their evening meal he would go, concealed by a hooded cloak, to pray in the churches of the city. He founded a school of his own for the training of the clergy. The best known of his pupils is the later Abbot of Limoges, Aredius, who was the authority of Gregory of Tours for the latter's biographical account of Nicetius. Gregory of Tours, wrote the oldest Nicetius Vita, and praised the fearless advocacy of the Bishop.

== Veneration ==
Nicetius was buried in the church of St. Maximin at Trier. In the diocese of Trier, he is revered as a saint. His feast day is celebrated at Trier on 1 October; in the Roman Martyrology his name is placed under 5 December.

The genuineness of two treatises ascribed to him is doubtful: "De Vigiliis servorum Dei" and "De Psalmodiæ Bono".

Titles of the Great Christian Church
| Preceded by Aprunculus | Archbishop of Trier; 526 – 566 | Succeeded by Magnerich |
