= O. M. Dalton =

British museum curator and archaeologist

Ormonde Maddock Dalton, FBA (1866–1945) was a British museum curator and archaeologist. Though very much an all-rounder, his main expertise was in medieval art. He usually published as O. M. Dalton, but also wrote under the pseudonym W. Compton Leith.

From 1921 to 1928 he was Keeper of the British and Medieval Antiquities Department at the British Museum. As well as the books below, he wrote a stream of articles and short books for the museum.

== Works ==
- Handbook to the Ethnographical Collections (1910) with Thomas Athol Joyce.
- Byzantine Art and Archaeology (1911), handbook of art and artefacts.
- East Christian Art (1925).

Translations

- Gregory of Tours. The History of the Franks. 2 vol. trans. O. M. Dalton. Oxford: Clarendon Press, 1927
- Josef Strzygowski, Origin of Christian Church Art' (1923), translation with Hermann Justus Braunholtz.
