= 580s =

Decade

The 580s decade ran from January 1, 580, to December 31, 589.

== Events ==
=== By place ===
==== Byzantine Empire ====
- The Roman Senate sends an embassy to Constantinople, with a gift (3,000 pounds of gold) to Emperor Tiberius II Constantine, along with a plea for help against the Lombards.
- The Slavs begin to migrate into the Balkan Peninsula. The Avars, under King (khagan) Bayan I, invade the Lower Danube (modern Bulgaria).
- Siege of Sirmium: The Avars march to the right bank of the River Sava, and besiege the Byzantine stronghold of Sirmium (Pannonia).

==== Europe ====
- The Lombards drive the last Ostrogoths across the Alps (Northern Italy). During the "Rule of the Dukes" the Lombards adopt Roman titles, names, and traditions.
- King Liuvigild calls for an Arian synod in Toledo (central Spain), which modifies several doctrines; he tries to unify the Christians within the Visigothic Kingdom.

==== Britain ====
- Æthelberht succeeds his father Eormenric as king (bretwalda) of Kent (approximate date).

==== Asia ====
- The Northern Zhou dynasty, strategically based in the basin of the Wei River, is supreme in Northern China. In the south only the Chen dynasty remains a rival.
- The Chinese city of Ye (Henan) is razed to the ground by Yang Jian, future founder of the Sui dynasty, who defeats a resistance force under Yuchi Jiong.

=== By topic ===
==== Religion ====
- Gregory of Tours is brought before a council of bishops, on charges of slandering the Frankish queen Fredegund (approximate date).

=== By place ===
==== Byzantine Empire ====
- Byzantine–Sasanian War: A Byzantine army commanded by Maurice, and supported by Ghassanid forces under King Al-Mundhir III, fails to capture the Persian capital, Ctesiphon, along the Euphrates.
- Maurice accuses Mundhir III of treason, and brings him to Constantinople to face trial. Emperor Tiberius II Constantine treats him well, and allows Mundhir with his family a comfortable residence.
- Al-Nu'man VI, son (de facto) of Mundhir III, revolts with the Ghassanids against the Byzantine Empire, after his father is treacherously arrested.

==== Europe ====
- Palace coup in Austrasia: New advisors break the peace treaty with King Guntram, and make a new alliance with his half brother Chilperic I, in which Childebert II, age 11, is recognized as Chilperic's heir.
- The Lombards under Zotto, Duke of Benevento, sack the abbey of Monte Cassino near Naples. The Benedictine monks who survive flee to Rome, but they return to the site, and rebuild the monastery.
- The Göktürks under Taspar Qaghan besiege the city of Chersonesos Taurica (modern Ukraine), located at the Black Sea; their cavalry keep plundering the steppes of the Crimean Peninsula until 590.

==== Britain ====
- The Anglo-Saxons under Ælla conquer Deira (Northern England) from the Britons. He becomes the first king of Deira (according to the Anglo-Saxon Chronicle).

==== Asia ====
- The Northern Zhou dynasty ends: Yáng Jiān executes the last ruler, 8-year-old Jing Di, along with 58 royal relatives at Chang'an. He proclaims himself emperor, and establishes the Sui dynasty in China.
- The "Great City of Helu", situated on the shores of Taihu Lake, is renamed Suzhou during the Sui dynasty (approximate date).
- In the Turkic Empire an interregnum begins, since there are several candidates to the throne: Talopien (late khagan's candidate), Ishbara (Kurultai's choice) and Tardu (western yabghu).
- Ishbara Qaghan, grandson of Bumin Qaghan, becomes the new ruler (khagan) of the Turkic Khaganate (Central Asia).
- The Sui dynasty begins.

=== By topic ===
==== Literature ====
- Maurice writes an encyclopedic work on the science of war (the Strategikon), which exercises a major influence on the military system.

==== Religion ====
- Second Council of Mâcon: In a council of Christian bishops in Mâcon (Burgundy), Jews are prohibited from serving as judges or customs officers.

=== By place ===
==== Byzantine Empire ====
- August 14 – Emperor Tiberius II Constantine, age 47, dies (possibly from deliberately poisoned food) at Constantinople, after a 4-year reign during which Thrace and Greece have been inundated by the Slavs. He is succeeded by his son-in-law Maurice, former notary who has commanded the Byzantine army in the war against the Persian Empire.
- Autumn – Maurice elevates John Mystacon to magister militum per Orientem. He sends a Byzantine expeditionary force to Arzanene (Armenia), where they fight a pitched battle at the river Nymphius (Batman River).

==== Europe ====
- Siege of Sirmium: The Avars, under their ruler (khagan) Bayan I, aided by Slavic auxiliary troops, capture the city of Sirmium after almost a 3-year siege. Bayan establishes a new base of operations within the Byzantine Empire, from which he plunders the Balkan Peninsula, including Athens.
- Gundoald, illegitimate son of Clotaire I, arrives with the financial support of Constantinople in southern Gaul. He claims as usurper king the cities Poitiers and Toulouse, part of the Frankish Kingdom (approximate date).
- The Visigoths under King Liuvigild capture the city of Mérida (western central Spain), which is under the political control of its popular bishop Masona. He is arrested and exiled for 3 years.

==== Persia ====
- A Persian army under Tamkhosrau crosses the Euphrates River and attacks the city of Constantina (modern Turkey), but he is defeated by the Byzantines and killed.

==== Asia ====
- Spring – Emperor Xuan of Chen, age 52, dies after a 13-year reign and is succeeded by his incompetent son Chen Shubao (Houzhu), who becomes the new ruler of the Chen dynasty.
- Emperor Wen of the Sui dynasty orders the building of a new capital, which he calls Daxing (Great Prosperity), on a site southeast of Chang'an (modern Xi'an).

=== By topic ===
==== Religion ====
- April 11 – John Nesteutes becomes the 33rd bishop or patriarch of Constantinople.

=== By place ===
==== Byzantine Empire ====
- Emperor Maurice decides to end the annual tribute to the Avars, a mounted people who have swept across Russia and threatened the Balkan Peninsula. They capture the cities of Singidunum (modern Belgrade) and Viminacium (Moesia).

==== Europe ====
- King Liuvigild lays siege to Seville (Southern Spain), and forms an alliance with the Byzantines. He summons his rebellious son Hermenegild back to Toledo, and forces him to abandon the Chalcedonian Faith.
- The city of Monemvasia (Peloponnese) is founded by people seeking refuge from the Slavs and Avars.
- Eboric (also called Euric) succeeds his father Miro as king of the Suevi (Hispania Gallaecia).

==== Arabia ====
- Muhammad, age 12, accompanies his uncle Abu Talib during trading journeys to Syria.

==== Mesoamerica ====
- Yohl Ikʼnal succeeds Kan Bahlam I as queen of the Maya city of Palenque (Mexico).

=== By topic ===
==== Medicine ====
- Smallpox begins spreading from China to Japan and Korea (approximate date).

=== By place ===
==== Europe ====
- September – King Chilperic I is stabbed to death while returning from a hunt near Chelles, after a 23-year reign over a territory extending from Aquitaine, to the northern seacoast of what later will be France. His wife Fredegund, who has paid for his assassination, seizes his wealth, flees to Paris with her son Chlothar II, and persuades the nobles to accept him as legitimate heir while she serves as regent, continuing her power struggles with Guntram, king of Burgundy, and her sister Brunhilda, queen mother of Austrasia.
- The Lombards re-establish a unified monarchy after a 10-year interregnum (Rule of the Dukes). Threatened by a Frankish invasion that the dukes have provoked, they elect Authari (son of Cleph) as their king and give him the capital of Pavia (Northern Italy).
- The Visigoths under King Liuvigild capture the city of Seville, after a siege of nearly 2 years. His rebellious son Hermenegild seeks refuge in a church at Córdoba, but is arrested and banished to Tarragona. His wife Inguld flees with her son to Africa.
- The Exarchate of Ravenna is founded, and organised into a group of duchies, mainly coastal cities on the Italian Peninsula. The civil and military head of these Byzantine territories is the exarch (governor) in Ravenna.
- The Slavs push south on the Balkan Peninsula – partly in conjunction with the Avars under their ruler (khagan) Bayan I – ravaging the cities Athens and Corinth, and threatening the Long Walls of Constantinople.
- King Eboric is deposed by his mother (second husband Andeca) who becomes the new ruler of the Kingdom of Galicia (Northern Spain) and the Suevi.
- Gundoald, illegitimate son of Chlothar I, tries to expend his territory from Brive-la-Gaillarde (Burgundy) and proclaims himself king (approximate date).

==== Britain ====
- Battle of Fethanleigh: King Ceawlin of Wessex is defeated by the Britons. He ravages the surrounding countryside in revenge (approximate date).

==== Asia ====
- Emperor Wéndi of the Sui dynasty organises the Grand Canal. He builds ships for transportation and grain stores are located at strategic points.

=== By place ===
==== Europe ====
- King Childebert II, age 15, takes up his sole rule of Austrasia. A Frankish army under King Guntram marches to Comminges (Pyrenees), and besieges the citadel of Saint-Bertrand.
- July – Gundoald, Merovingian usurper king, and his followers are defeated during the siege of Saint-Bertrand. He is executed and Guntram stages a triumphal entry into Orléans.
- The Visigoths under King Liuvigild devastate the Suevic Kingdom in Gallaecia (northwest Spain).

==== Persia ====
- The Persian commander, Kardarigan ("black hawk"), begins an unsuccessful siege of Monokarton (modern Turkey).

==== Britain ====
- Hussa succeeds his brother Frithuwald as king of Bernicia (approximate date).
- Creoda becomes king of Mercia (according to the Anglo-Saxon Chronicle).

==== Asia ====
- September 15 – Emperor Bidatsu, age 47, dies of smallpox after a 13-year reign, and is succeeded by his brother Yōmei as the 31st emperor of Japan.
- Emperor Xiao Jing Di succeeds his father Xiao Ming Di as ruler of the Liang dynasty (China).

=== By topic ===
==== Religion ====
- King Wideok of Baekje (Korea) sends an official escort (bearing tribute), along with a master of Buddhist meditation, a reciter of Buddhist magic spells, a temple architect, and a sculptor of Buddhist images, to the Chinese court of the Sui dynasty (approximate date).
- The Armenian bishop Kardutsat goes with 7 priests, on a missionary trip to the steppes north of the Caucasus. He succeeds in baptizing many Huns and in translating books into their language.
- Columbanus, Irish missionary, gathers 12 companions for his journey to Britain, probably to the Scottish coast. After a short time, he crosses the English Channel and lands in Brittany (France).
- Zhiyi, Chinese monk, returns to the city of Jinling, where he completes his commentarial works on the Lotus Sutra.

=== By place ===
==== Byzantine Empire ====
- Spring – Emperor Maurice rejects a peace proposal of the Persians, in exchange for renewed payments in gold.
- Battle of Solachon: A Byzantine army under command of Philippicus defeats the Sassanid Persians, near Dara.
- The Avars besiege Thessalonica (Central Macedonia), the second city of the Byzantine Empire.
- The Vlachs are first mentioned in a Byzantine chronicle (approximate date).

==== Europe ====
- April 21 – King Liuvigild dies at Toledo after an 18-year reign, and is succeeded by his second son Reccared I.
- Slavs advance to the gates of Thessaloniki and the Peloponnese.
- Avars destroy a lien of Roman camps along the Danubian Limes, including Oescus and Ratiaria.

=== By topic ===
==== Art ====
- The Page with the Crucifixion, from the "Rabbula Gospels", at the Monastery of St. John in Beth Zagba (Syria), is completed. It is now kept at the Biblioteca Medicea Laurenziana, Florence, Italy.

==== Religion ====
- Japanese Buddhism comes under attack as a "foreign" religion.
- Saint Comgall founds an abbey in Bangor, Northern Ireland.
- King Custennin of Dumnonia is converted to Christianity.

=== By place ===
==== Eastern Roman Empire ====
- Emperor Maurice builds more fortifications along the Danube frontier, separating the Byzantine Empire from the realm of the Avars and Slavs (approximate date).
- Comentiolus, Byzantine general (magister militum), assembles an army of 10,000 men at Anchialus (modern Bulgaria). He prepares an ambush for the Avars in the Haemus Mountains.

==== Europe ====
- King Guntram sends envoys to Brittany, to stop the raiding on Frankish territory. He compels obedience from Waroch II and demands 1,000 solidus for looting Nantes.
- King Reccared I renounces Arianism and adopts Catholicism. Many Visigothic nobles follow his example, but in Septimania (Southern Gaul) there are Arian uprisings.
- November 28 – Treaty of Andelot: Guntram recognizes King Childebert II of Austrasia as heir. He signs a treaty with Queen Brunhilda at Andelot-Blancheville.
- Winter – Childebert II appoints Uncelen as the Duke of Alemannia (approximate date).

==== Britain ====
- Sledd succeeds his father Æscwine as king of Essex (approximate date).

==== Asia ====
- Battle of Shigisan: The Soga clan, which has intermarried with the royal Yamato clan, fights the Mononobe and Nakatomi clans over influence in selecting a new successor for the Japanese throne, after Emperor Yōmei dies. The Soga favor importing Buddhism from the Asian mainland, described there as the religion of the most civilized. The Mononobe and Nakatomi hold that Buddhism would be an affront to the gods. The Soga win the civil war and Sushun, age 66, becomes the 32nd emperor of Japan.
- Fall – The Liang dynasty ends: Emperor Wéndi of the Sui dynasty abolishes Western Liang and expands his territory into the lower valley of the Yangtze River. He sends his official Gao Jiong to the capital Jiangling, to pacify the citizens. The former emperor Xiao Jing Di becomes a vassal and is named the Duke of Liang.
- Bagha Qaghan becomes the seventh ruler (khagan) of the Turkic Kaganate.

=== By topic ===
==== Religion ====
- The filioque clause is first used in the Nicene Creed, against the Arians in Visigothic Spain (approximate date).

=== By place ===
==== Byzantine Empire ====
- Byzantine-Sassanid War: Unpaid Byzantine troops mutiny against Priscus (magister militum per Orientem). King Hormizd IV begins a Persian offensive, but is defeated at Martyropolis (modern Turkey).
- Summer – Guaram I of Iberia, Georgian prince in exile, is sent by Emperor Maurice to the city of Mtskheta (Georgia). He restores the monarchy and is bestowed with the Byzantine court title of curopalates.

==== Europe ====
- The Franks and Burgundians under King Guntram and his nephew Childebert II invade Northern Italy, but suffer a disastrous defeat against the Lombards.
- The Lombard Kingdom (Italy) is converted to Roman Catholicism under the rule of King Authari (approximate date).

==== Britain ====
- Æthelric succeeds his father Ælla as king of Deira in Northern England.

==== Persia ====
- First Perso-Turkic War: A Persian army (12,000 men) under Bahrām Chobin, supported by Cataphracts (heavy cavalry), ambush the invading Turks, and win a great victory at the Battle of the Hyrcanian Rock.

==== Asia ====
- Emperor Wéndi of the Sui dynasty prepares a campaign against the Chen dynasty. He amasses 518,000 troops along the northern bank of the Yangtze River, stretching from Sichuan to the Pacific Ocean.

=== By topic ===
==== Religion ====
- The Skellig Michael monastery is founded on a steep rocky island off the coast of Ireland (approximate date).
- The Guanghua Temple in Putian (China) is built during the Chen dynasty, under Emperor Chen Wu Di.

=== By place ===
==== Byzantine Empire ====
- Byzantine–Sassanid War: A Persian army under Bahrām Chobin captures the fortress city of Martyropolis (modern Turkey).

==== Europe ====
- May 15 – King Authari marries Theodelinda, daughter of the Bavarian duke Garibald I. A Catholic, she has great influence at court and among the Lombard nobility.
- King Childebert II attempts to impose taxes on the citizens of Tours; Bishop Gregory successfully opposes this by claiming state immunity instituted by Fredegund.
- King Guntram sends an expedition into Septimania (Southern Gaul), in support of a rebellion by the Arian bishop Athaloc.
- Claudius, duke (dux) of Lusitania, defeats the Franks and Burgundians at Carcassonne (Languedoc) on the Aude River.
- October 17 – Breach at Cucca. The Adige River overflows its banks, flooding the church of St. Zeno and damaging the walls of Verona.
- The plague hits Rome, and its victims include Pope Pelagius II.

==== Persia ====
- First Perso-Turkic War: The Sassanid Persians capture the cities Balkh and Herat (Afghanistan). They cross the Oxus River and repulse a Turkic invasion.

==== Asia ====
- The Chinese Empire is reunited under the leadership of Emperor Wéndi (Sui dynasty), who defeats the Chen forces at Jiankang (modern Nanjing), ending the Chen dynasty (the last of the Southern dynasties) that has ruled since 557.
- Yan Zhitui, scholar-official, makes the first reference to the use of toilet paper in human history. It is used in the Chinese imperial court and amongst the other wealthy citizens.
- Tulan Qaghan, son of Ishbara Qaghan, becomes the seventh ruler (khagan) of the Turkic Khaganate.

=== By topic ===
==== Religion ====
- Gregory, archdeacon of Rome, converts English slaves on the Roman market. He calls them Angels if they would be Christians.
- The Third Council of Toledo, called by King Reccared I of the Visigoths, renounces Arianism and embraces Catholicism.
- The Council of Narbonne is held. In Septimania, Jews are forbidden from chanting psalms while burying their dead.

== Significant people ==
- Pope Gregory I
- Bahrām Chōbin
- Fredegund
- Guntram
- Emperor Wen of Sui
- Yan Zhitui

== Births ==
580

- Abdel Rahman ibn Awf, companion of Muhammad
- Bilal ibn Rabah al-Habashi, companion of Muhammad
- Cadfan ap Iago, king of Gwynedd (approximate date)
- Clemen ap Bledric, king of Dumnonia (approximate date)
- Dayi Daoxin, Chán Buddhist patriarch (d. 651)
- Didier of Cahors, Frankish bishop (approximate date)
- Fabia Eudokia, Byzantine empress (approximate date)
- Livinus, Irish apostle (approximate date)
- Maximus the Confessor, monk and theologian (d. 662)
- Pepin the Elder, Frankish Mayor of the Palace (d. 640)
- Umm Salama, wife of Muhammad (approximate date)
- Wei Zheng, chancellor of the Tang dynasty (d. 643)

581

- Sun Simiao, Chinese medicine doctor (approximate date)
- Yan Shigu, Chinese author of the Tang dynasty (d. 645)

582

- Arnulf of Metz, Frankish bishop and saint (approximate date)
- Li Mi, Chinese rebel leader during the Sui dynasty (d. 619)

583

- Abu Ubaidah, companion of Muhammad (d. 639)
- Liuva II, king of the Visigoths (d. 603)
- Theodosius, Byzantine co-emperor (approximate date)
- Umar, companion of Muhammad (d. 644) and second Caliph of Rashidun Caliphate
- Xiao Xian, prince of the Liang dynasty (d. 621)

584

- Amand, bishop and saint (approximate date)
- Chlothar II, king of the Franks (d. 629)
- Yang Zhao, prince of the Sui dynasty (d. 606)

585

- Du Ruhui, chancellor of the Tang dynasty (d. 630)
- Edwin of Northumbria, king of Deira and Bernicia (d. 633)
- Goar of Aquitaine, priest and hermit (approximate date)
- Yang Jian, imperial prince of the Sui dynasty (d. 618)
- Yuchi Gong, general of the Tang dynasty (d. 658)
- Khalid Ibn Al-Walid, general of the rashidun Caliphate (d. 642)

586

- Theudebert II, king of Austrasia (d. 612)
- Yang Hao, prince of the Sui dynasty (approximate date)

587

- Soga no Emishi, statesman of Japan (d. 645)
- Theuderic II, king of Austrasia (d. 613)
- Zhang Xingcheng, chancellor of the Tang dynasty (d. 653)

588

- Eligius, bishop and saint (approximate date)
- Suintila, king of the Visigoths (approximate date)
- Yu Zhining, chancellor of the Tang dynasty (d. 665)

589

- Li Jiancheng, prince of the Tang dynasty (d. 626)
- Ramlah bint Abi Sufyan, wife of Muhammad (d. 666)

== Deaths ==
580

- Audovera, wife of Chilperic I (approximate date)
- Bacurius III, king of Iberia (Georgia)
- Dorotheus of Gaza, monk and abbot (approximate date)
- Eormenric, king of Kent (approximate date)
- Galam Cennalath, king of the Picts
- Gao Anagong, high official of Northern Qi
- Martin of Braga, missionary and archbishop
- Wei Xiaokuan, general of Western Wei (b. 509)
- Xuan Di, emperor of Northern Zhou (b. 559)
- Yuchi Jiong, general of Northern Zhou

581

- Feng Xiaolian, concubine of Gao Wei (approximate date)
- Jing Di, Chinese emperor of Northern Zhou (b. 573)
- Taspar Qaghan, ruler (khagan) of the Göktürks

582

- April 5 – Eutychius, patriarch of Constantinople
- August 14 – Tiberius II Constantine, Byzantine Emperor
- Agathias, Greek poet and historian (approximate date)
- Ashina, empress of Northern Zhou (b. 551)
- Justinian, Byzantine general (magister militum)
- Tamkhosrau, Sassanid Persian general (marzban)
- Xuan Di, emperor of the Chen dynasty (b. 530)

583

- February 1 – Kan Bahlam I, ruler of Palenque (b. 524)
- Miro, king of the Suevi

584

- April 15 – Ruadhán of Lorrha, Irish abbot and saint
- Chilperic I, king of Neustria (or Soissons)
- Deiniol, bishop of Bangor (Wales)
- Ingund, wife of Visigoth prince Hermenegild
- Maurus, Roman abbot and saint (b. 512)
- Approximate date – Bridei I, king of the Picts

585

- April 13 – Hermenegild, Visigothic prince (or 586)
- September 14 – Bidatsu, emperor of Japan (b. 538)
- Cassiodorus, Roman statesman and writer (approximate date)
- Frithuwald, king of Bernicia (approximate date)
- Gundoald, Merovingian usurper king (approximate date)
- John of Ephesus, Armenian bishop (approximate date)
- Rigunth, daughter of Chilperic I (b. 570)
- Xiao Ming Di, emperor of the Liang dynasty (b. 542)

586

- April 21 – Liuvigild, king of the Visigoths
- Hermenegild, Visigothic prince (or 585)
- Prætextatus, bishop of Rouen (or 589)
- Rhun ap Maelgwn, king of Gwynedd
- Zhu Manyue, empress of Northern Zhou (b. 547)

587

- April – Yōmei, emperor of Japan (b. 540)
- August 13 – Radegund, Frankish princess
- Æscwine, king of Essex (approximate date)
- Ishbara Qaghan, ruler (khagan) of the Göktürks
- Mononobe no Moriya, clan leader (Ō-muraji)
- Varāhamihira, Indian astronomer (b. 505)

588

- Áed mac Bricc, Irish bishop and saint
- Ælla, king of Deira (approximate date)
- Agericus, bishop of Verdun
- Fridianus, Irish prince and saint
- Li Ezi, empress of Northern Zhou (b. 536)
- Monulph, bishop of Maastricht

589

- March 1 – David, Welsh bishop and saint
- Bagha Qaghan, ruler of the Turkic Khaganate
- Finnian of Moville, Irish missionary (b. 495)
- Zhang Lihua, consort of the Chen dynasty

== Bibliography ==
- Greatrex, Geoffrey; Lieu, Samuel N. C. (2002). The Roman Eastern Frontier and the Persian Wars (Part II, 363–630 AD). London: Routledge. ISBN 0-415-14687-9.
- Martindale, John R., ed. (1992). The Prosopography of the Later Roman Empire: Volume III, AD 527–641. Cambridge: Cambridge University Press. ISBN 0-521-20160-8.
- Whitby, Michael; Whitby, Mary (1986). The History of Theophylact Simocatta. Oxford: Clarendon Press. ISBN 978-0-19-822799-1.
