= 589 =

Calendar year

589 in various calendars
- Gregorian calendar: 589; DLXXXIX
- Ab urbe condita: 1342
- Armenian calendar: 38; ԹՎ ԼԸ
- Assyrian calendar: 5339
- Balinese saka calendar: 510–511
- Bengali calendar: −5 – −4
- Berber calendar: 1539
- Buddhist calendar: 1133
- Burmese calendar: −49
- Byzantine calendar: 6097–6098
- Chinese calendar: 戊申年 (Earth Monkey); 3286 or 3079 — to — 己酉年 (Earth Rooster); 3287 or 3080
- Coptic calendar: 305–306
- Discordian calendar: 1755
- Ethiopian calendar: 581–582
- Hebrew calendar: 4349–4350
- Hindu calendars
- Vikram Samvat: 645–646
- Shaka Samvat: 510–511
- Kali Yuga: 3689–3690
- Holocene calendar: 10589
- Iranian calendar: 33 BP – 32 BP
- Islamic calendar: 34 BH – 33 BH
- Javanese calendar: 478–479
- Julian calendar: 589; DLXXXIX
- Korean calendar: 2922
- Minguo calendar: 1323 before ROC 民前1323年
- Nanakshahi calendar: −879
- Seleucid era: 900/901 AG
- Thai solar calendar: 1131–1132
- Tibetan calendar: ས་ཕོ་སྤྲེ་ལོ་ (male Earth-Monkey); 715 or 334 or −438 — to — ས་མོ་བྱ་ལོ་ (female Earth-Bird); 716 or 335 or −437

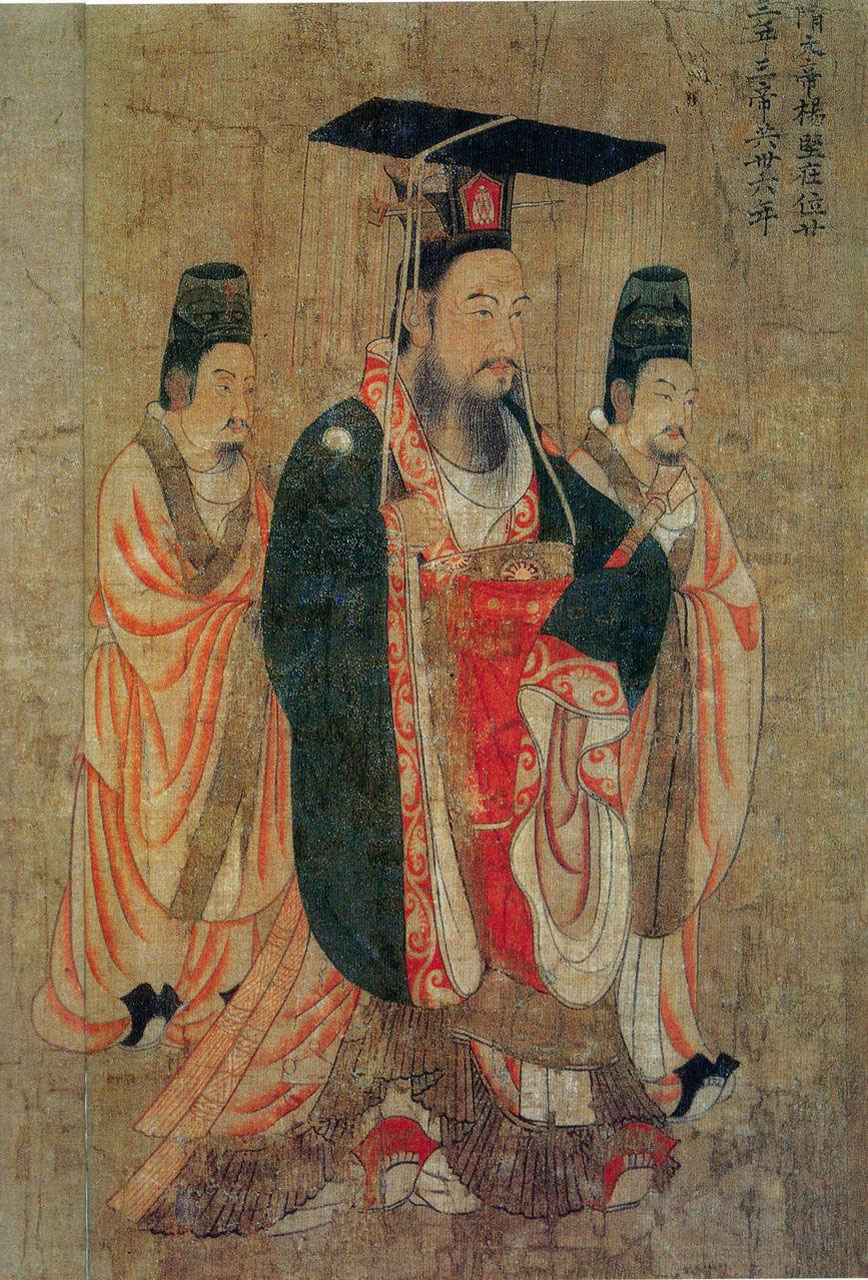
Emperor Wen of the Sui dynasty (541–604)

Year 589 (DLXXXIX) was a common year starting on Saturday of the Julian calendar. The denomination 589 for this year has been used since the early medieval period, when the Anno Domini calendar era became the prevalent method in Europe for naming years.

== Events ==
=== By place ===
==== Byzantine Empire ====
- Byzantine–Sassanid War: A Persian army under Bahrām Chobin captures the fortress city of Martyropolis (modern Turkey).

==== Europe ====
- May 15 – King Authari marries Theodelinda, daughter of the Bavarian duke Garibald I. A Catholic, she has great influence at court and among the Lombard nobility.
- King Childebert II attempts to impose taxes on the citizens of Tours; Bishop Gregory successfully opposes this by claiming state immunity instituted by Fredegund.
- King Guntram sends an expedition into Septimania (Southern Gaul), in support of a rebellion by the Arian bishop Athaloc.
- Claudius, duke (dux) of Lusitania, defeats the Franks and Burgundians at Carcassonne (Languedoc) on the Aude River.
- October 17 – Breach at Cucca. The Adige River overflows its banks, flooding the church of St. Zeno and damaging the walls of Verona.
- The plague hits Rome, and its victims include Pope Pelagius II.

==== Persia ====
- First Perso-Turkic War: The Sassanid Persians capture the cities Balkh and Herat (Afghanistan). They cross the Oxus River and repulse a Turkic invasion.

==== Asia ====
- The Chinese Empire is reunited under the leadership of Emperor Wéndi (Sui dynasty), who defeats the Chen forces at Jiankang (modern Nanjing), ending the Chen dynasty (the last of the Southern dynasties) that has ruled since 557.
- Yan Zhitui, scholar-official, makes the first reference to the use of toilet paper in human history. It is used in the Chinese imperial court and amongst the other wealthy citizens.
- Tulan Qaghan, son of Ishbara Qaghan, becomes the seventh ruler (khagan) of the Turkic Khaganate.

=== By topic ===
==== Religion ====
- Gregory, archdeacon of Rome, converts English slaves on the Roman market. He calls them Angels if they would be Christians.
- The Third Council of Toledo, called by King Reccared I of the Visigoths, renounces Arianism and embraces Catholicism.
- The Council of Narbonne is held. In Septimania, Jews are forbidden from chanting psalms while burying their dead.

== Births ==
- Li Jiancheng, prince of the Tang dynasty (d. 626)
- Ramlah bint Abi Sufyan, wife of Muhammad (d. 666)

== Deaths ==
- March 1 – David, Welsh bishop and saint
- Bagha Qaghan, ruler of the Turkic Khaganate
- Finnian of Moville, Irish missionary (b. 495)
- Zhang Lihua, consort of the Chen dynasty
