= Zhangsun Sheng =

Sui dynasty statesman (552–609)

Zhangsun Cheng
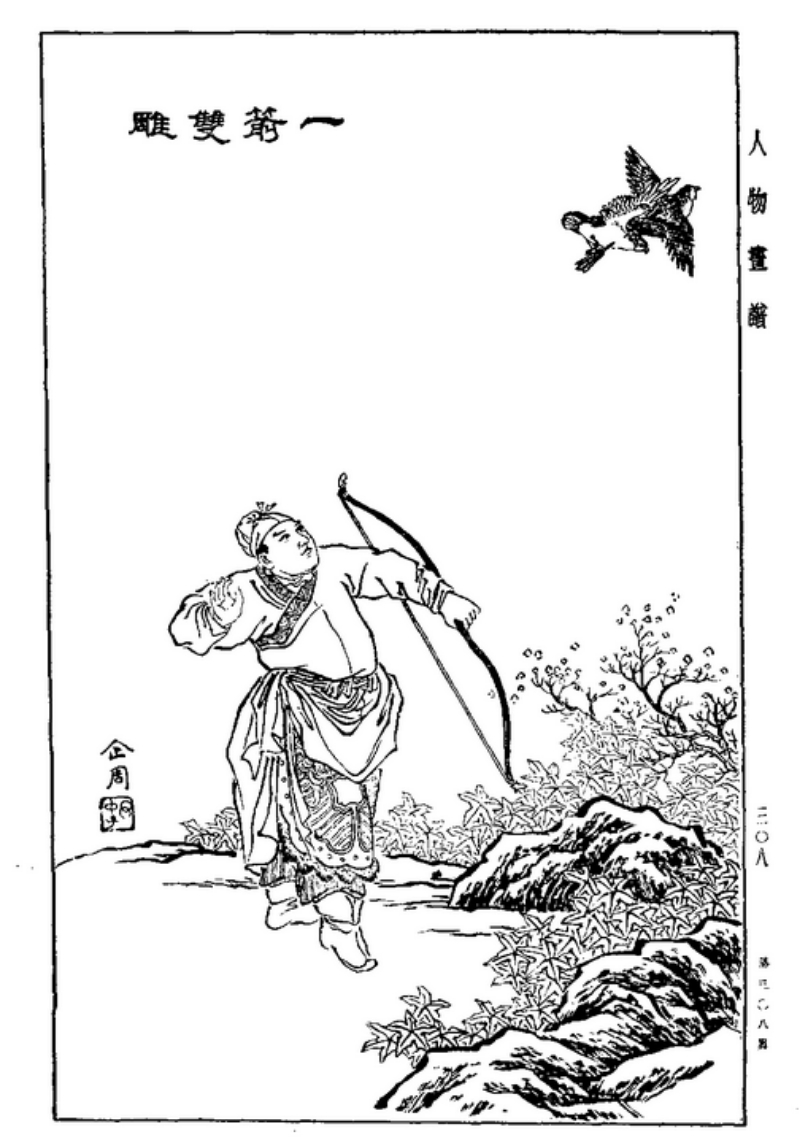
- Zhangsun Sheng kills two birds with one arrow (Ma Tai, 1928)
- Born: Zhangsun Cheng (長孫晟); 552; Luoyang, Northern Qi dynasty
- Died: 609 (aged 56–57); Sui dynasty
- Issue: Empress Zhangsun; Zhangsun Wuji
Names
- Courtesy name: Jìchéng (季晟)
Posthumous name
- Duke Xian of Qi (齊獻公)
- Father: Zhangsun Si
- Mother: Lady Chigan

Zhangsun Sheng or Zhangsun Cheng (Chinese: 長孫晟; pinyin: Zhǎngsūn Chéng; 552—609), courtesy name Jicheng (季晟), posthumous name Duke Xian of Qi (齊獻公), was a Chinese statesman, diplomat and general of Xianbei ethnicity of the Sui dynasty. He was the Sui dynasty's chief strategist on Göktürk policy. He was described as "intelligent and quick-witted, had some knowledge of clerical work, was skilled in pellet shooting and archery, and was exceptionally agile". He was posthumously given the noble title Duke of Qi (齊國公) and the posthumous name Xian (獻) by the Tang dynasty.

== Biography ==
=== Early life ===
Zhangsun Sheng was born in 552 in Luoyang during the Northern Zhou dynasty to Zhangsun Si (长孙兕) and a lady from the Chigan (or Xue) clan. (Note: Both Zhangsun and Chigan were sinicized Xianbei surnames. See Change of Xianbei names to Han names for more.) He hailed from Zhangsun Clan of Henan. It was written that his ancestors traced their origin to the Northern Wei's founding emperor Taiwu's 17th generation ancestor Tuoba Kuaili (拓跋儈立) — that their ancestor was Tuoba Kuali's third son, who took the surname Baba (拔拔), eventually changed to Zhangsun when Emperor Xiaowen of Northern Wei changed Xianbei surnames to Han surnames in 496. He had an elder brother, Zhangsun Chi (长孙炽; 549 – 15 November 610), who was also a Sui official.

Orphaned at the age of 14, he was enrolled in the military. At the age of 18, he became an upper officer in the guard. Initially, he was not well-known and went unrecognized by others according to Book of Sui until his meeting with Yang Jian who was impressed with his skills.

=== Career ===
==== Under Northern Zhou ====
In 580, the Turkic leader Taspar Qaghan sought marriage with Northern Zhou. Emperor Xuan of Northern Zhou betrothed the daughter of his uncle Yuwen Zhao (宇文招) to him. Following Xuan's death, Yang Jian, the regent for Emperor Xuan's son Emperor Jing of Northern Zhou, continued to offer Princess Qianjin. Next year Taspar also died and was followed by a short civil-war. The new qaghan Ishbara continued the negotiations. During the marriage negotiations, both Northern Zhou and Ishbara showcased their native talents and selected brave warriors as envoys. As a result, Zhangsun Sheng was dispatched as an envoy, serving as an assistant to Yuwen Shenqing to escort Princess Qianjin. Ishbara took a liking to Zhangsun Sheng and frequently invited him on hunts, leading to Zhangsun Sheng staying there for nearly a year. According to Chinese sources, during one outing, they encountered two eagles fighting over meat. Ishbara handed Zhangsun Sheng two arrows and said, "Please shoot them." Zhangsun Sheng rode swiftly, just as the eagles were grappling, and shot them both with a single arrow. Khagan was overjoyed and ordered all his nobles to befriend Changsun Sheng and learn his archery skills. This late became a common motif in Chinese art.

==== Under Sui ====
In 581, Northern Zhou was replaced by the Sui dynasty and all members of the Yuwen clan were put to death. Meanwhile, incited by his wife, Ishbara started a campaign against the Sui. He was allied with Gao Baoning (高寶寧), the former Northern Qi general who was still holding Ying Province (營州, roughly modern Zhaoyang, Liaoning). His patron now in power, Sheng started to work as a strategist for the new Emperor Wen of Sui. In response, under advice from Sheng, the Emperor carried out the strategy of placating Ishbara's subordinates. Sheng's memorial thoroughly described rivalries between Turkic nobles: "Tardu, compared to Ishbara, has strong troops but a lower position. Outwardly they seem aligned, but inwardly their rift is evident. If we incite their feelings, they will inevitably fight each other. Chuluohou, Ishbara's brother, is cunning but weak, and though he curries favor with the people, they love him and thus he is distrusted by Ishbara, making him uneasy. Apa is hesitant and caught in the middle, somewhat fearing Ishbara, following his lead out of strength, but without a firm heart. We should now form distant alliances and attack nearby, separating the strong and uniting with the weak. By sending envoys to Tardu and persuading Apa, Ishbara will withdraw his troops to defend his right. By bringing in Chuluohou and connecting with the Khitan and Xi tribes, Ishbara will have to divide his forces to defend his left. With suspicions from end to end and internal discord, in a dozen years, we can take advantage of their strife and conquer their country in one strike."

In 582, Ishbara marched on China with support from Apa and Tamgan. According to Chinese sources – which may be exaggerated – Ishbara led 400,000 cavalry from Lanzhou where they defeated Daxi Zhangru's (達奚長儒) army and sought to advance further south. Surprisingly, Tardu left his army and Ashina Rangan, who was approached by Zhangsun Sheng who gave false news about a revolt of the Tiele to Ishbara, causing him to retreat. Later that year, Ishbara led another force against the Sui. Wen sent his brother Yang Shuang (楊爽) in response. Yang Shuang achieved a great victory, and part of his army, commanded by the general Yin Shou (陰壽), defeated Gao Baoning, forcing Gao to try to flee to the Khitan, but on the way, Gao was killed by his own subordinates, ending the last Northern Qi resistance. Apa on the other hand was tricked by Zhangsun Sheng, who told him that Tardu already submitted to China and Ishbara was preparing to attack Apa's camp, leading him to submit to Sui. In 583, as Zhangsun predicted, Ishbara attacked Apa's camp and killed his mother. Having nowhere to turn, Apa fled west to seek refuge with Tardu.

Later, Tulan Qaghan submitted a petition requesting a new marriage in exchange, and the court was inclined to approve it. Sheng advised that Tulan was unreliable and only aligned with Sui due to his conflict with Tardu. If they agreed to the marriage, he would ultimately betray the Sui. If he married a princess, leveraging Chinese power, Tardu and Ashina Rangan would inevitably be forced to comply. Once strong, the Göktürks would rebel again, making it difficult to manage. Moreover, Rangan was the son of Chuluohou and had been loyal to the Sui. Sheng had met him before, and he also requested marriage. According to Sheng, it would be better to approve his request, invite him to move south, where his small force would be easier to control, and use him as a buffer against Tulan. The Emperor once again adopted this proposal. He sent Princess Anyi (安义公主) as a bride to Rangan.

Tulan was assassinated by his own men in 599 and the Sui dynasty moved to replace him with Qimin Qaghan, which was not accepted by Tardu. Tardu was confronted by Shi Wansui (史萬歲) and later Gao Jiong and Yang Su in the following months. During the campaign, the Chinese army poisoned drinking water around Tardu's encampment, greatly weakening his army. Tardu had to retreat without serious combat, but this defeat was disastrous for him. After a rebellion of his subjects, he fled to Tuyuhun around 604. Sheng sent Qimin Qaghan to resettle at the steppe, as a result of which the Eastern Turkic Khaganate was established.
