= Shi Danai =

Turkic prince and military general of Sui and Tang dynasties

- 史大奈
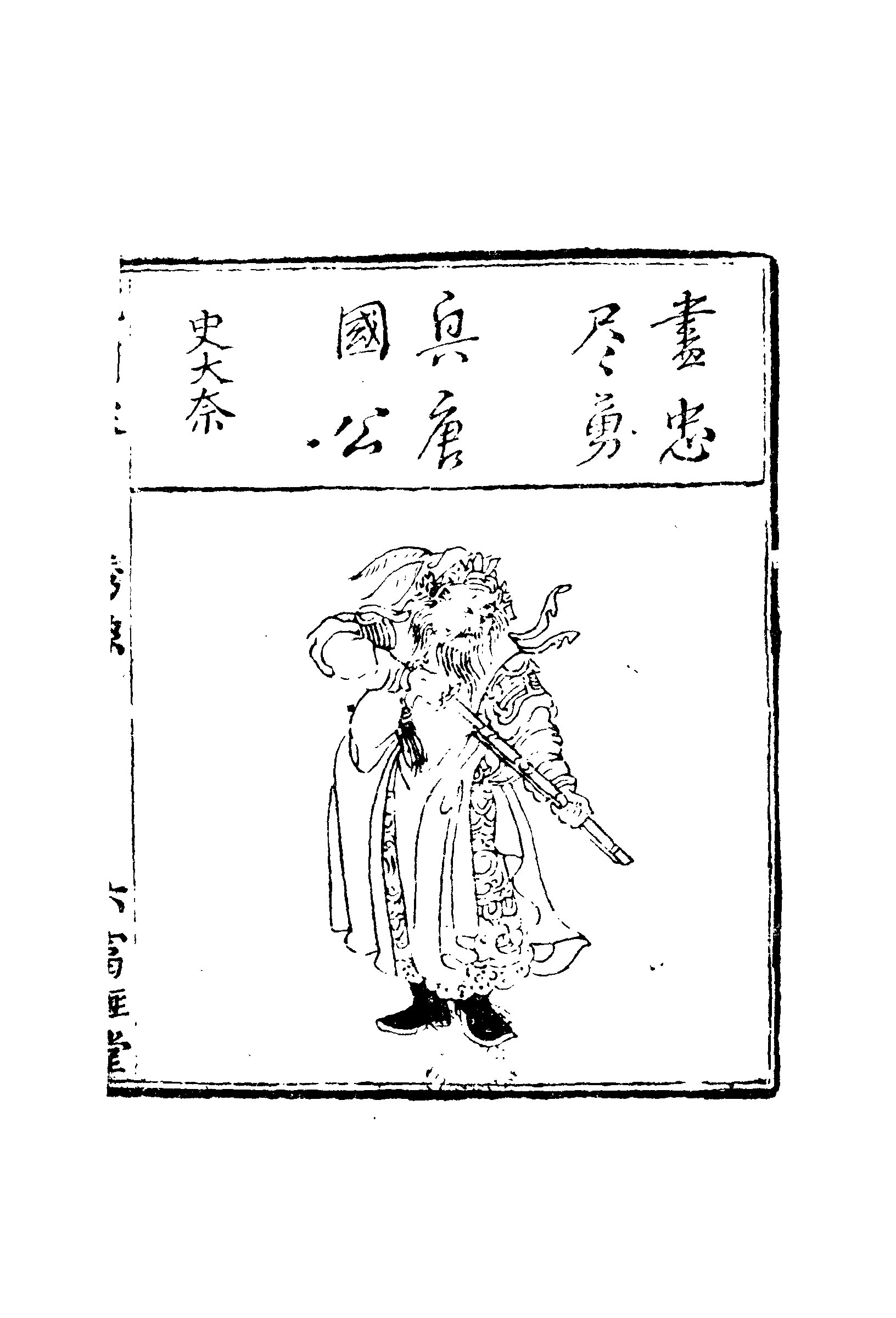
- A depiction of Shi Danai from "Illustrated Romance of the Wagang Stockade" (繡像瓦崗寨演義傳), 1861

Governor of Feng
- In office 630–637
- Preceded by: Liu Lan
- Succeeded by: Liu Lan

Personal details
- Born: Ashina Danai (阿史那大奈)
- Died: December 14, 638
- Resting place: Zhao Mausoleum
- Parent: Ashina Tong (阿史那統)

Shi Danai (Chinese: 史大奈), né Ashina Danai (阿史那大奈), noble title Duke of Dou (竇國公), was a tegin of the Western Turkic Khaganate and a military general and official of the Sui and Tang dynasties. He was a grandson of Bagha Qaghan.

== Early years ==
His birth date is unknown. The New Book of Tang merely mentions him as "Western Turkic tegin". Text on his death stele was found in Dunhuang Manuscript S.2078, part of a student writing practice sample. According to this text, his father was Shiduo Gongmi Shad, himself a son of Mohe Qaghan. Zhu Zhenhong identified Mohe Qaghan with Bagha Qaghan. His father was identified with Ashina Tong (阿史那統) through a grandson's stele - Shi Siguang (史思光). According to same stele, Ashina Tong served as Grand Master of the Palace (光祿大夫). His father's title under Bagha Qaghan was a shad. However, after disintegration of the united khaganate, Tong and his sons fled from Tulan Qaghan's domain to service of Tardu. Following deaths of Tardu in 603 and Niri Qaghan in 604, Tong was also likely killed during fights against the Tiele.

Ashina Danai was styled tegin during the reign of Nijue Chuluo Khagan, who probably aimed at stripping him of independent command over troops and tacitly reducing his political standing. Ashina Danai fled to Sui dynasty after fall of Chuluo at the hands of Shegui Khagan in 611 alongside former khagan and khagan's brother Kuta Shad (Chinese: 闕達設; pinyin: Quèdá Shè).

== Service to the Sui and Tang dynasties ==
=== Under Sui dynasty ===
After fleeing to Emperor Yang of Sui in January 611, both Danai and former khagan joined emperor's army. Former khagan was newly granted the title Heshana Qaghan and was given in marriage a princess of the imperial clan, Princess Xinyi (信義公主), together with ten brocade robes and 10,000 bolts of coloured silks. Ashina Danai on the other hand was appointed Grand Master of Splendour with Gold and Purple (金紫光祿大夫), and awarded one thousand bolts of goods. This title was a san’guan (散官) of subordinate second rank. Afterwards, Emperor Yang stationed the troops under Danai’s command in newly-established Loufan Commandery (樓煩郡, modern Xinzhou, Shanxi) on the Sui northern frontier. He took part in the Goguryeo–Sui War from 612 to 614 as well.

These appointments by Emperor Yang soon enraged Shibi Qaghan. In the fall of 615, when Emperor Yang was visiting Yanmen Commandery on the northern frontier, Shibi launched a surprise attack on the area, overrunning most of its Chinese settlements. Warned by Shibi's wife Princess Yicheng — a member of the imperial family who had been well treated by Empress Xiao during an earlier visit — the Emperor, Empress, and their entourage escaped to the commandery seat at present-day Daixian. During this time Ashina Danai moved his forces to Jinyang where he served together with Li Yuan.

=== Under Tang dynasty ===
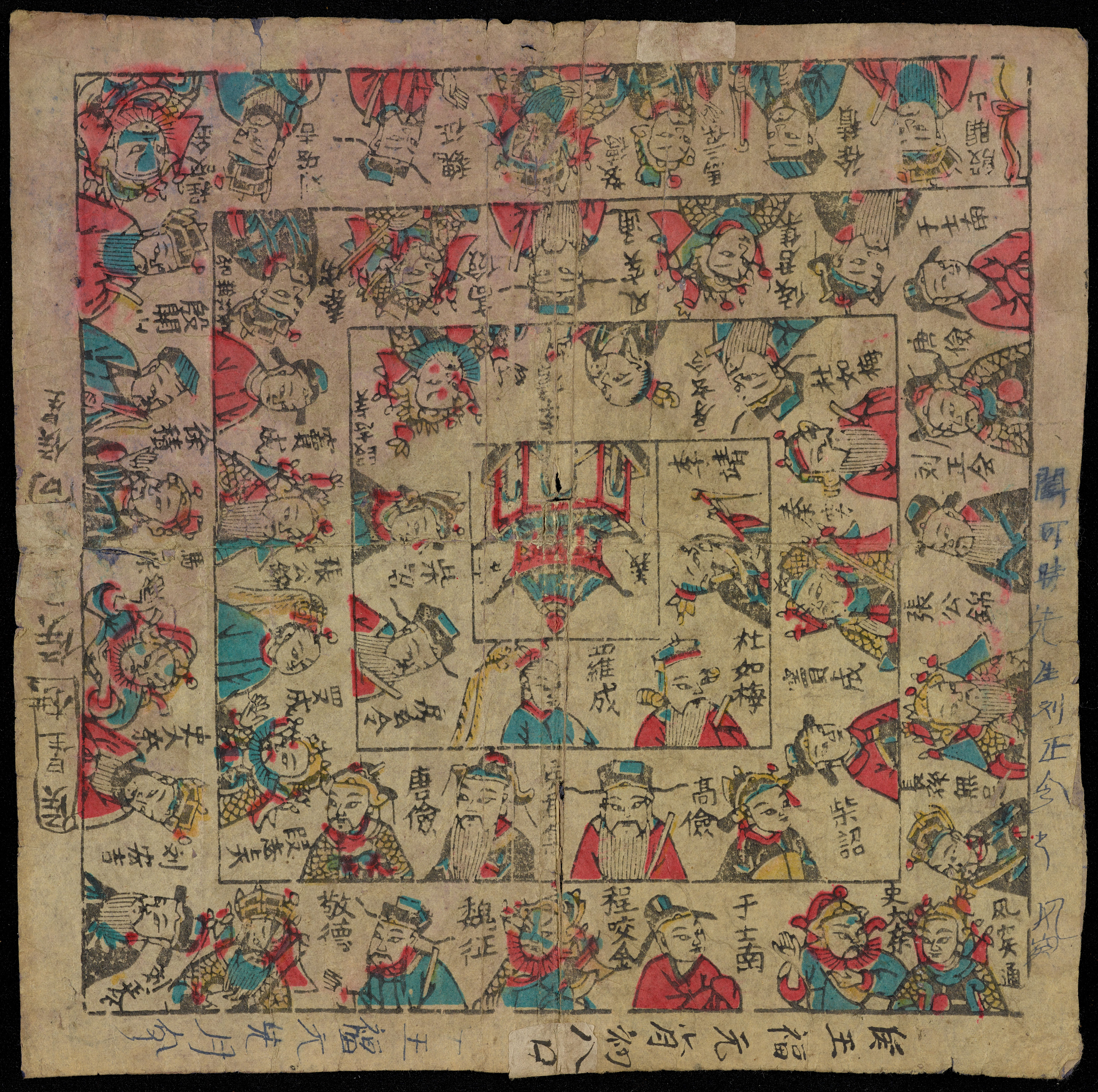
Shi Danai (second to left from bottom-right) as represented in Qing era dice game board.

He later joined Li Yuan in his rebellion against the Sui dynasty's region of Guanzhong in July 617. His 500-strong Turkic cavalry was instrumental in defeating Sui general Sang Xianhe (桑顯和) alongside Chai Shao during the Battle of Yinma Spring from an attack on his rear, for which he was rewarded with the honorific title Grand Master for Splendid Happiness (Chinese: 光祿大夫; pinyin: Guānglù Dàfū). He was bestowed a Chinese surname Shi (史) after Li Yuan entered Chang'an same year.

He was granted Senior Pillar of State title and was enfeoffed Duke of Kang with 3,000 households by the new emperor Gaozu of Tang, after defeat of Xue Ju in 618. In 620 he was commissioned Right Assisting Guard General; first substantive (duty) office in the palace guards. He was instrumental in capturing Dou Jiande and destroying Wang Shichong in 621. In 623, Shi Danai accompanied the Crown Prince Li Jiancheng in defeating Liu Heita. In 629, he was promoted to Grand General of the Right Martial Guard when Ashina Xichun's son Ashina Momo surrendered to Tang. Next year, following the fall of Illig Qaghan in May 630, he was appoint as acting governor of Feng Prefecture, overseeing surrendered Eastern Türk households while his ennoblement retitled to Duke of Dou (竇國公).

After serving as governor of Feng until its abolishment in 637 and died on 14 December 638, buried in the Zhao Mausoleum.

== Family ==
He had two sons:

- Shi Renbiao (史仁表) married Princess Pu'an (普安公主), the eighth daughter of Taizong of Tang.
- Shi Renji (史仁基) — served as general of the Jinwu Guards, appointed prefect of Mianzhou (綿州), Huazhou (華州) and Ningzhou (寧州). Enfeoffed Marquis of Leling (樂陵縣開國侯)
  - Shi Siguang (史思光, d. 736) — served as Chamberlain for Petitions (太子通事舍人) and Director of the Imperial Stables Bureau (尚乘直長); later as county magistrate of Yang’an in Jianzhou (簡州陽安縣令), Zhengping in Jiangzhou (絳州正平縣令), and Jincheng in Jingzhao-fu (京兆府金城縣令); he held Left Guard Commandant (左衛率府郎將) and Vice-Commander of the Left Palace Guard (左司禦率府副率), and was appointed Deputy Prefect of Hangzhou (杭州別駕) and of the Anzhou Governor-General’s Office (安州都督府別駕); he bore the honorary rank Senior Grand Master of the Palace (太中大夫), with honours Senior Pillar of State (上柱國); 2nd Marquis of Leling. Married Lady Pang (龐氏), sixth daughter of Pang Tongshan (龐同善), Right Jinwu Grand General and heir to Duke Puguo (濮國公) with whom he had:
    - Shi Yuanyi (史元一) — Assistant Director at the Court of State Ceremonies (鴻臚寺丞)
    - Shi Fu (史孚) — Chamberlain for Petitions (太子通事舍人) and designated heir (嗣子)

== In literature and media ==
- Shi Danai is a character in Tale of Tang (說唐), a Qing era novel.
- He was portrayed by Jiang Diwu in the Chinese TV series Heroes in Sui and Tang Dynasties (2013).
- He was portrayed by Zhao Qiusheng in the Chinese TV series Heroes of Sui and Tang Dynasties (2012).

== Sources ==
- Xiong, Victor Cunrui (2006), Emperor Yang of the Sui Dynasty: His Life, Times, and Legacy, Albany: State University of New York Press, ISBN 9780791482681
