= Uyghur timeline =

Ethnic timeline

This timeline is a supplement of the main article Uyghur. Dealing with the centuries between 400 and 900 AD, it refers to a critical period in the cultural formation of the Uyghur nation, as they transitioned from a minor Turkic tribe to the Uyghur Khaganate.

== Events leading to the formation of the Uyghur Khaganate ==
Date	People	Event	Geopolitical Context
546	Bumin	Pre-emptively strikes a planned Töle revolt	Attempt of the vassal Turks to gain ascendancy over the vassal Gaoqu people
560	Muqan	Annexes Töle tribes under a federal system	Muqan demonstrates his qut by the submission of the Töle (i.e. the right of taxation over their livestock); resolves internal power struggle
565	Wu Chen-Di	Civil war divides the Wei Kingdom	Muqan demonstrates his qut by the submission of the Töle (i.e. the right of taxation over their livestock); resolves internal power struggle
572	Istämi	Divides Muqan's realm between his rival successors: Taspar-Qağan rules in the central region, Istämi-Yabgu in the far-west, Shetu in the east and Jotan in the west	Traditional power transfer from elder to younger brother, subsequently from youngest uncle to eldest nephew
575	Tardu	Takes power in far-west region	His father dies in Taraz
575	You-Zhou	Qi dynasty collapses	Qi = Eastern Wei, Rouran allies; Zhou = Western Wei, Turk allies
578	Taspar	Repeatedly raids the Zhou Kingdom	Under the influence of the Qi exiles
578	Wu-Di	Gives Taspar 100,000 bales of silk and the Princess Zhou Tsienkien	Marriage alliance prevents raids
578	Wu-Di	Kidnaps Prince Kaozhou as he is hunting	To eliminate rival to power
578	Taspar	Takes no action against the Zhou Kingdom's violation of his power. Instead, he places 10,000 Turks as 'guests' in Zhou	He has a secret agreement to trade the Prince Kaozhou for Princess Tsienkien. The lack of honor to a guest outrages the common people. This period shows the beginning of class separation and the movement of Turkic nobility into the Chinese cultural sphere.
580	Shang Sun	Arrives with Zhou Tsienkien and befriends Shetu	To collect information about the Turks for Zhou
581	Wen-Di	At the death of Emperor Jing-Di, he seizes power as regent for the new Emperor who is still a child	His dynastic claim is based on his daughter, the Emperor's Mother
581	Taspar	???Muqan	Maybe as part of an agreement between Muqan and Taspar
581	Ishbara Qaghan	Swearing he will attack Talopien to uphold tradition, he is the voice of conservative factions	If tradition is followed, he will be the next Qağan
581	Änlo	Taspar dies and the toy appoints Änlo	To avoid conflict between the three conflicting claims of Tardu, Shetu and Talopien
581	Talopien	Threatens Änlo	He views himself as the legal Qağan because he has been given the title by the previous one
581	Änlo	Cedes title to Shetu at Ötükän and takes title of second Qağan	In exchange for protection, the empty title and to control the Tola Valley (Uyğur tribes)
582	Wen-Di	Deposes Zhou Emperor and expels the 10,000 Turks from Changan	To show his independence and to end the drain on the treasury
582	Shetu	Forms a coalition force with Tardu, Jotan and Talopien	To reinforce his position as Qağan and to avenge his wife's family
582	Wen-Di	Sends ambassador Yuan Huei to recognize him as Qağan by presenting him with the symbolic wolf flag at Hami	Tardu is upset that he was not made Qağan by the toy, so Wen-Di gives him diplomatic recognition which legitimizes his claim. He thereby acquires qut
582	Tardu	Declares the far-west region as sovereign and separate with himself as Qağan	The far-west region has de facto independence since the Istämi-Muqan era
583	Shetu	Blames Talopien for the failures of the campaign	Rivalry and the influence of Shang Sun
583	Talopien	Joins Jotan and Boru in the west region.	They are all opposed to Shetu's paranoia, assassination and tyranny west
583	Shetu	Kills Talopien's family and burns his yurt in revenge	Altay mountains
583	Tardu and Wen-Di	Attack simultaneously with Khitan (Shetu's own vassals in the east)	To block Shetu's power. The attack by his nominal vassals and allies erodes the credibility of Shetu, meaning he has lost qut
583	Shetu	As he only controls the central region, it is hit by famine; he asks for Sui Imperial protection	This act officially marks the end of his sovereignty, he is now a Chinese vassal
584	Talopien	Takes control of east, central and west regions	Talopien proves himself as the true Qağan by his qut
585	Wen-Di	Renames Zhou Tsienkien as Sui Dai	To make Shetu his vassal (son-in-law) because he now fears the growing power of Tardu and Talopien
585	Shetu	Sends his son Kohoden as a hostage to Changan	To seal the peace agreement
585	Talopien	Defeats Tardu and takes over far-west region, now controlling all four regions	Tardu no longer enjoys Sui Imperial support and is a rival to power that has to be eliminated as a threat
585	Tardu	Flee to Sui protection	Tardu no longer enjoys Sui Imperial support and is a rival to power that has to be eliminated as a threat
585	Tiele tribes	Submit to Talopien	He is strong enough to threaten them, therefore he has consolidated power/qut.
587	Shetu	Dies while hunting	Possible accident or an assassination
588	Chulo	Captures Talopien	Family vendetta, his older brother Shetu had been humiliated by this man. The Sui Empire supports this move to balance the growing power of Talopien
588	Nili	Replaces Talopien as Qağan; Töle tribes revolt	Try to regain lost independence in the chaos of the dynastic struggle
588	Chulo	Dies fighting the Töle	To reassert control over the tribes that had been vassal to Talopien
588	Tülan	Takes power and returns to Mongolian Steppe	All the rivals to power in the struggle for succession have been neutralized, so power reverts to the House of Shetu
589	Wen-Di	Conquers Chen Kingdom, thus reunifying China	???
590	Tardu	Attacks Nili to regain the far-west region	He is supported by Tülan who wants to see his last rival Nili eliminated. In effect, he recognizes the sovereignty of the far-west region
593	Tülan	Stops paying taxes	???
593	Sui Dai	Plots with Nili to attack Sui Empire	Revenge against Sui dynasty for overthrowing her family, the Zhou dynasty
593	Shang Sun	Requests Tülan to kill Sui Dai, but he refuses	To demonstrate he no longer is a vassal to the Sui
593	Shang Sun	Offers Princess Anyi to Zhangar Khan if he will kill Sui Dai	To create a rival to Tülan's power and thus restore a balance of power by creating another civil war
593	Tülan	Suspects Zhangar of treason	Zhangar has received so many gifts and visits from Chinese, this is tantamount to diplomatic recognition
594	Tülan	Makes peace with Tardu	Tardu has eliminated his rival; this act formally recognizes the independence of the far-west region from the Khanate
594	Shang sun	Bribes an official of the toy and exposes Sui Dai plotting with Chinese (Chen government in exile) and Sogdians (with one of whom she is having an affair)	To make the Tülan lose face in front of the toy to weaken his power, also to provide a pretext for killing the troublesome Sui Dai
594	Tülan	Executes Sui Dai	Under Turkic custom, adultery is punished by the death penalty
597	Zhangar	Marries Sui Anyi and rebels against Tülan	By marrying the Princess, he has a claim to sovereignty
597	Tülan	Kills Zhangar's family and drives him to the Ordos Loop under Sui Imperial protection	Asserts his authority
598	Tardu	Defeats Nili, Chulo takes his place	Asserts his authority
599	Tülan	Killed in Töle revolt	Töle tribes take advantage of the chaos to gain independence
600	Tardu	Defeats Chulo and declares himself supreme Qağan	A vacuum of power has been created by the loss of Zhangar, Chulo and Tülan
600	Chulo	Takes Sui Imperial protection	The Sui Empire needs him to balance the power of Tardu
600	Erkin Tegin	Initiates diplomatic contacts with China	This is the first official account of the Uyghur tribe, which at this time lived in the Tola valley with 10,000 yurts
601	Chang Sunsheng	Creates an alliance with the Töle Beys including Erkin Tegin of the Uyghur tribe	This is the first official account of the Uyghur tribe, which at this time lived in the Tola valley with 10,000 yurts
601	Tardu	Attacks Changan	As a warning to the Sui Empire not to interfere in the Turk's internal power struggles
601	Shang sun	Poisons all the wells in the Gobi Desert	Tardu's army is superior and cannot be defeated by conventional warfare
603	Erkin Tegin	Töle tribes revolt against Tardu	The Chinese are afraid of Tardu and must eliminate his base of power
603	Tardu	Abdicates to Tibet	???
603	Erkin Tegin	Töle alliance dissolves in the aftermath of the revolt; three tribes come under Uyghur control (Bugut, Tongra and Bayirqu)	The Uyghurs gained enough qut to pull in other tribes to the alliance
603	Zhangar	Marries Sui Yicheng and assumes the title Qağan, but as a vassal to china	Zhangar is the last of the vassal khans to China. He is particularly devoted and loyal
603	Chulo	Assumes title Qağan in the far-west region, but as a vassal to China; rules from Tashkent and Kucha	Since Tardu has been eliminated, power reverts to the House of Muqan
605	Sui Yang-Di	Ascends the Dragon Throne	???
609	Shipi	Takes power after Zhangar	???
609	Chang Sunsheng	Replaced by Peichu	???
609	Peichu	Offers to support Shipi's brother Qağan and a Chinese Princess, but he refuses	The traditional tactic of dividing power counter Shipi's growing strength
611	Chulo	Attempts to extend his authority over the Töle	By taxing their livestock
611	Töle	Töle tribes revolt under Syr-Tardush drives out Chulo	Uyghurs occupy second position in the alliance
611	Shekuei	Takes power and restores House of Tardu	???
615	Shipi	Subjugates the Töle	???
615	Shipi	Stops paying taxes to the Sui Empire	Asserts sovereignty
615	Peichu	Lures Sogdian vizers to the city of Mai and kills them in a trap	To keep them from exposing the Chinese plots to the Qağan
615	Shipi	Attacks Sui Yang-Di	Revenge for his treachery at Mai
615	Sui Yiching	Lies to her husband that the Töle tribes are in revolt	So he will leave, saving Sui Yang-Di from capture
615	Yang-Di	Sui Empire begins civil war	The humiliation of his defeat damages his prestige
616	Tang Taizong	Captures Changan with support of Turks; he gains 20,000 horses and 5,000 cavalry in return for giving the rights to plunder all the gold and women in Changan	???
618	Tang Taizong	Places his father as Emperor of the Tang dynasty	???
626	Tang Taizong	Kills his brothers and becomes Emperor	The Wu-men Gate incident
627	Khile Qagan	Tries to tax the Töle to replace his horses that were killed during a summer snow	???
627	Aynan Khan	Initiates a Syr-Tardush lead revolt of Töle tribes against Khile-Qağan	The Uyghurs again occupy second position under Pusa Ilteber
627	Aynan Khan	Declares a Khanate at Otuken	???
630	Taizong	Attacks in coordination with Khitan and Töle, utterly defeating the Turks and taking Khile-Qaghan prisoner	Tang-Töle alliance replaces Sui-Töle against the Turks
632	Tang Taizong	Annexes all Tokharian city states as vassals	Indirect Chinese rule of Tarim city states
640	Tang Taizong	Kucha (Kutsi) rebels in alliance with Onoq	???
640	Songtsen Gampo	Unifies Tibet with Buddhism as the state religion	???
645	Jubi Qağan	Unifies Onoq	???
646	Pusa (菩萨), son of Tejian (特健)	Allies with Syr-Tardush to defeat Eastern Qaġanate	He is granted with a Chinese title of prefect creating a legal precedent for leadership
646	Tumitu Ilteber (吐迷度)	Assassinates Pusa and defeats the Syr-Tardush; declares a state at Otuken	First Uyghur state; this becomes the precedent for all later claims for the right to rule. Moreover, he is a Chinese vassal paying a tax of furs
648	Tang Taizong	Replaces all vassal Tokharian kings with Chinese officials under the governor-general in Kaochang; the Tarim Basin is now the western protectorate	The Chinese are now directly rule the Tarim city states
648	Tumitu Ilteber	Assassinated by nephew Wuhe, who is in turn assassinated by Chinese spies	Wuhe is a Gokturk sympathizer and therefore an enemy of Chinese interests
648	Pojuan Ilteber (婆闰)	Installed as new Khan; he becomes a loyal vassal of China	Uyghurs now carry Chinese titles and work as mercenaries in the 'pacifed west'
650	???	China captures Kashgar and Khotan	???
650	Tang Taizong	Dies, his son Kaozong creating a scandal by marrying Taizong's former concubine Zhou Wu-Mei	By custom, Wu-Mei should have retired to a convent after her husband's death. This unusual marriage indicates she had an extramarital affair with Kaozong prior to Taizong's death
651	Holu Khan	Unifies the Onoq and threatens China	???
651	Pojuan Ilteber	Defeats Korean rebellion	The Uyghurs view the Chinese as both allies and kingmakers
651	???	Arabs advance to Herat	???
652	???	Arabs sack Balkh, then return to Khorosan	???
657	Pojuan Khan	Leads Uyğur army and defeats Holu in the name of the Tang Empire	Onoq power is broken, the Uyghurs ally with China to defeat the last remnants of their ancestral enemy, the Turks Chu valley
657	Pojuan Khan	Killed during the battle of Goguryeo (高句丽)	The Chinese break off diplomatic ties with Uyghur
659	Kaozong	Creates 10 tribal states in Onoq territory of which each one is governed by a vassal khan	The far-western region of the Turks is now subdued by China
659	Xuanzong	China annexes Suyab and Tashkent, marking the maximum extent of Chinese power	???
660	Gaozong	Suffers stroke and delegates power to his wife Wu Zetian	???
661	???	Onoq and Tibet drive the Tang out of Tarim	???
660	Tiele	Revolt against China	Tribute has not been paid
661	Pilatu	Succeeds her brother as Ilteber	???
621	Wu Zetian	Suppresses revolt at Khangai	???
663	Pilatu	Uyghur power declines	???
663	???	Arabs invade Bactria	???
663	???	Tibet takes Vakhan, Gilit and Kashgar	???
665	???	Onoq enters revolt	???
670	???	Tibet seizes four garrisons with the Chinese army retreating to Turpan	The Chinese divert their trade route north from Turpan to Beshbaliq, Suyab and Tashkent
679	???	Tibet controls four garrisons	???
680	Kutlug	Declares Orkhon Khanate	End of Tang Imperial control of Mongolian Steppe
681	Pro-China Tiele	Escapes to Liangzhou	They have lost qut and must flee to the steppe
682	Kutlug	Reunites the 16 tribes	Rise of Turk power
682	Tuchiachi	Is defeated by Kutluk; the Uyghurs move to the Selenga valley	The Uyghur lose sovereignty but not autonomy
683	Wu Zetian	Takes the Dragon Throne	This is a coup d'état
688	Kutlug	Defeats Uyğurs	???
690	Wu Zetian	Seizes absolute power by appealing to Buddhist millennialism	???
691	Kutlug	Defeats Toquz-Oghuz	???
692	Wu Zetian	Recovers Karashahr and Kucha	???
692	Kapğan	Succeeds his brother as the new Qağan	Traditional succession from older to younger brother
692	???	Tang Imperial army retakes the four garrisons	???
693	Kapğan	Defeats Tang Imperial army	???
694	Wu Zetian	Recovers Khotan and Kashgar	???
698	Kapğan	Defeats Türğish at the battle of Bolchu near Lake Urungu	This rendered the western steppe region vassal to the Orkhon Khanate
700	Bilgä shad	Attacks Tangut Kingdom	???
701	Tonyukuk-Ayguchy	Captures Sogdiana	This was a vassal of the Onoq to achieve total victory over his enemies
702	Kapğan	Attacks Xia Kingdom	???
703	???	Turko-Tibetan alliance is formed, but fails to defeat Tang army	???
703	???	Onoq retakes Suyab	???
705	Wu Zetian	Abdicates to Zhongzong	???
705	???	Tibetan-Gandharan alliance is formed and drives the Arabs from Bactria	???
705	Qutayba	Appointed governor of Khorosan	???
706	Qutayba	Captures Bukhara	???
707	Bukharan leader	Asks Khapgan for military support against the Arabs	???
708	Xuanzong	Offers reward to three vassal tribes for the head of Kapğan	???
710	Zhongzong	Poisoned by his wife Empress Wei who has an affair with Wu Sansi	???
710	Xuanzong	Takes power with his aunt Princess Taiping (daughter of Empress Wu)	???
710	Kyrgyz tribes	Revolt and are defeated	???
710	Qutayba	Places Tugshada on the throne of Bukhara and Ghurek on the throne of Samarkand	???
711	Turgish Khan	Revolt begins	???
711	Qarluk	Revolt and are defeated in 714	???
712	Xuanzong	Begins reign and kills Princess Taiping	???
712	Qutayba	Invades Bactria	???
712	Samarkand leader	Asks Khapgan for military support against the Arabs	???
712	???	Turks control Sogd	???
712	King of Fargana	Flees to Kucha under Chinese protection	???
714	Izgil tribe	Revolt and are defeated in 715	???
715	Toquz-Oguz tribe	Revolt and are defeated in 716 (this revolt includes the Uyghur tribe)	???
715	Qutayba	Assassinated by his troops in the Fargana valley	because he wishes to continue the campaign against the orders of the Caliph
715	King of Faragana	Returns as a Chinese vassal	???
715	King of Faragana	Returns as a Chinese vassal	???
716	Bayirqu tribe	Revolt and are defeated, but a rouge warrior ambushes Kapğan and kills him and sends his head to Changan with envoy Ho Lingchüan (July 22, Tola river)	???
716	Uyğur tribe	Revolt with Qarluk and Toquz-oguz	Although defeated they become autonomous vassals in the Selenga valley
716	Bilgä	Kills Inel, Kapğan's whole family and all his officials	Inel is not fit to rule, moreover, by Turk law the throne should pass to Bilgä
718	Bilgä	Restores peace and ends all revolts	???
720	Xuanzong	Tries to attack Bilgä in coordination with Basmyl and Khitans, but fails, therefore accepting the terms of Bilgä's peace	???
721	Xuanzong	China controls Suyab, Kucha, Kashgar, Tashkent and Fargana	???
721	Xuanzong	Arabo-Turgish-Tibetan alliance defeats Chinese army; the Arabs take Faragana and the Turgish take Suyab	???
721	???	Tashkent becomes independent	???
721	???	Sogdo-Turgish alliance attacks Arabs	???
725	Tonyukuk	Dies	???
727	Bilgä	Refuses an anti-Tang alliance with the Tibetans	???
728	???	Sogdo-Turgish alliance liberates Sogd	???
729	???	Arabs control Bactria and Samarkand	Turgish control of Sogd, Fargana and Suyab; China control of North Tarim and Tibet control South Tarim
731	Köl Tegin	Dies	???
734	Bilgä	Poisoned by Buyruk Chor as part of a Chinese conspiracy	???
736	???	Sino-Arabian alliance is formed and defeats the Turgish at Suyab	China annexes Suyab, while Arabs occupy Sogd
739	???	Tibet allies with Gandhara	China annexes Suyab, while Arabs occupy Sogd
739	Ghurek	Reign ends	???
742	Xuanzong	Begins affair with Yang Gueifei and leaves power in the hands of An Rokhan	???
744	Ozmish Khan	Killed by Uyghur, Basmyl, Qarluk rebellion	???
745	???	Qarluk and Uyghur overthrow Basmyl Khan	???
745	???	Uyghur defeat Qarluk and declare a new Khanate at Otuken; the Qarluk move to the far-west region	???
745	Abu Muslim	Begins a Jihad in Sogd	???
747	Bayan Chor	Begins reign	???
748	???	Abbasid Caliphate begins	???
750	Chabish of Tashkent and Ilkhshid of Fargana	Begin a dispute; Chinese ally Ilkhshid and Turkish ally the Chabish send for help	???
750	General Kao Hsienchih	Sacks Tashkent after it surrenders, taking the Chabish and the Khan to be executed in Changan	???
750	Son of Chabish	Petitions governor Ziyad ibn Salih in Samarkand for revenge	???
751	Abu Muslim	Sends army at the request of Governor Salih, meeting the Kao Hsienchih at Talas	???
755	Abu Muslim	Assassinated	???
755	An Rokhan	Rebels against Xuanzong	???
755	An Rokhan	Captures Changan	???
756	Xuanzong	Abdicates and Yang Guifei is killed	???
759	Bogu Khan	Begins reign	???
763	Bogu Khan	Ends Ungluk Suyluk Topilingi (An Lushan) rebellion	???
