= 586 =

Calendar year

586 in various calendars
- Gregorian calendar: 586; DLXXXVI
- Ab urbe condita: 1339
- Armenian calendar: 35; ԹՎ ԼԵ
- Assyrian calendar: 5336
- Balinese saka calendar: 507–508
- Bengali calendar: −8 – −7
- Berber calendar: 1536
- Buddhist calendar: 1130
- Burmese calendar: −52
- Byzantine calendar: 6094–6095
- Chinese calendar: 乙巳年 (Wood Snake); 3283 or 3076 — to — 丙午年 (Fire Horse); 3284 or 3077
- Coptic calendar: 302–303
- Discordian calendar: 1752
- Ethiopian calendar: 578–579
- Hebrew calendar: 4346–4347
- Hindu calendars
- Vikram Samvat: 642–643
- Shaka Samvat: 507–508
- Kali Yuga: 3686–3687
- Holocene calendar: 10586
- Iranian calendar: 36 BP – 35 BP
- Islamic calendar: 37 BH – 36 BH
- Javanese calendar: 475–476
- Julian calendar: 586; DLXXXVI
- Korean calendar: 2919
- Minguo calendar: 1326 before ROC 民前1326年
- Nanakshahi calendar: −882
- Seleucid era: 897/898 AG
- Thai solar calendar: 1128–1129
- Tibetan calendar: ཤིང་མོ་སྦྲུལ་ལོ་ (female Wood-Snake); 712 or 331 or −441 — to — མེ་ཕོ་རྟ་ལོ་ (male Fire-Horse); 713 or 332 or −440

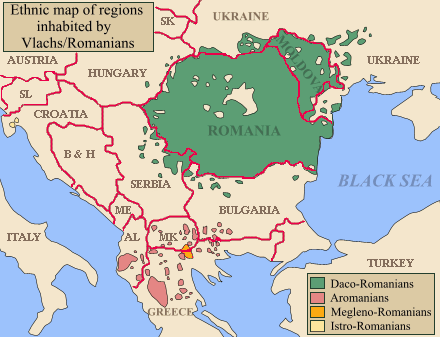
Map of Balkans inhabited by Vlachs/Romanians

Year 586 (DLXXXVI) was a common year starting on Tuesday of the Julian calendar. The denomination 586 for this year has been used since the early medieval period, when the Anno Domini calendar era became the prevalent method in Europe for naming years.

== Events ==
=== By place ===
==== Byzantine Empire ====
- Spring – Emperor Maurice rejects a peace proposal of the Persians, in exchange for renewed payments in gold.
- Battle of Solachon: A Byzantine army under command of Philippicus defeats the Sassanid Persians, near Dara.
- The Avars besiege Thessalonica (Central Macedonia), the second city of the Byzantine Empire.
- The Vlachs are first mentioned in a Byzantine chronicle (approximate date).

==== Europe ====
- April 21 – King Liuvigild dies at Toledo after an 18-year reign, and is succeeded by his second son Reccared I.
- Slavs advance to the gates of Thessaloniki and the Peloponnese.
- Avars destroy a lien of Roman camps along the Danubian Limes, including Oescus and Ratiaria.

=== By topic ===
==== Art ====
- The Page with the Crucifixion, from the "Rabbula Gospels", at the Monastery of St. John in Beth Zagba (Syria), is completed. It is now kept at the Biblioteca Medicea Laurenziana, Florence, Italy.

==== Religion ====
- Japanese Buddhism comes under attack as a "foreign" religion.
- Saint Comgall founds an abbey in Bangor, Northern Ireland.
- King Custennin of Dumnonia is converted to Christianity.

== Births ==
- Theudebert II, king of Austrasia (d. 612)
- Yang Hao, prince of the Sui dynasty (approximate date)

== Deaths ==
- April 21 – Liuvigild, king of the Visigoths
- Hermenegild, Visigothic prince (or 585)
- Prætextatus, bishop of Rouen (or 589)
- Rhun ap Maelgwn, king of Gwynedd
- Zhu Manyue, empress of Northern Zhou (b. 547)

== Bibliography ==
- Greatrex, Geoffrey; Lieu, Samuel N. C. (2002). The Roman Eastern Frontier and the Persian Wars (Part II, 363–630 AD). New York, New York and London, United Kingdom: Routledge (Taylor & Francis). ISBN 0-415-14687-9.
- Whitby, Michael; Whitby, Mary (1986). The History of Theophylact Simocatta. Oxford: Clarendon Press. ISBN 978-0-19-822799-1.
