= Timeline of the Turks =

Timeline of the Turks may refer to:

- Timeline of the Turks (500–1300) a general chronology between 500 and 1300
- Uyghur timeline a detailed timeline up to 763 (excludes most of Uyghur Khaganate)
- Timeline of the Sultanate of Rûm exclusively about Anatolia and vicinity between 1071 and 1302
- Timeline of Turkish history from 1299
