= Baddo (queen) =

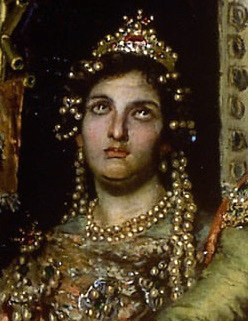
- Baddo in the picture of Reccared I converting to Nicene Christianity from Arianism at the Third Council of Toledo

Queen consort of the Visigothic Kingdom
- Tenure: c. 586 – c. 589
- Predecessor: Goiswintha
- Successor: Hildoara
- Born: 6th Century; Visigoth Kingdom
- Died: No earlier than 589
- Husband: Reccared I
- Religion: Arian; Nicene Christian

Baddo (Bauda) (6th-century – fl. 589) was a Visigoth queen consort by marriage to King Reccared I (580–601). She is the only Visigoth queen consort known to have signed official state documents and church documents, which signifies that she played a role in politics and had some influence over the government.

== Biography ==
=== Lineage ===
Many modern historians believe that Baddo’s lineage was first written about in Isidore of Seville’s Historia de regibus Gothorum, Vandalorum et Suevorum and the Continuatio Byzantia-Arabica. These historical sources mention that the mother of Liuva II, who himself was born in 583 or 584, was a commoner and a concubine to Reccared, who was at that time the youngest son of the ruler of the Visigothic kingdom Liuvigild. These researchers consider Baddo the sole known lawful wife of Reccared I.

Other modern medievalists, however, also hold the opinion that Baddo was not the mother of Liuva II, as marrying commoners was not a widespread practice among the Visigothic monarchy. The supporting claim is also made that Baddo was unable to bear Reccared a son and that Liuva II was declared heir to the throne after being borne by one of Reccared’s concubines.

=== Marriage ===
The date of Reccared I's marriage to Baddo is unknown. It could not take place before 584, since from 579 or 582 Reccared was betrothed to the Frankish princess Riguntha, daughter of King Chilperic I and Fredegunda. It was supposed to be a dynastic marriage, designed to normalize relations between the rulers of the Visigothic kingdom and the Frankish state. According to Gregory of Tours, in September 584, Riguntha went to Spain, but due to the death of Chilperic I and the consequent new Visigothic-Frankish war, the marriage was never officially concluded. It has been suggested that Reccared I may have married Baddo shortly after 584.

However, the date of the marriage is most likely later than Reccared I's accession to the throne in 586. This is supported by evidence that shortly after his father's death Reccared I attempted to marry Chlodoswintha, the daughter of the Frankish king Sigibert I and Brunhilde, but failed due to opposition from the King of Burgundy: Gunthramn. Perhaps the marriage of Reccared I and Baddo took place in 586 or 589.

=== Queen Consort ===
The date of Baddo's death is not reported in medieval sources. She probably predeceased her husband. It is not known for certain if Reccared I remarried after her death.
