= Sunna, Bishop of Mérida =

Sunna was an Arian Bishop of Mérida who together with count Segga headed a rising in Lusitania against the Visigothic king Reccared I after Reccared renounced Arianism in favour of Catholicism.

After Claudius, Reccared's dux Lusitaniae, successfully put down the rising Sunna was banished to Mauritania.
