= Segga =

Usurpers of the Visigothic Kingdom

Segga was a Visigothic usurper who briefly claimed the kingship in 587 before being defeated by Reccared I.

Following Reccared's conversion from Arianism to Catholicism, a conspiracy, led by Sunna, the Arian bishop of Mérida, arose to place the Arian Segga on the throne and probably also to kill the Catholic Méridan bishop, Masona, and the duke of the province of Lusitania, Claudius. In response, Reccared sent Claudius to put it down. The conspirators were betrayed by one of their own, Witteric, and Segga was captured. According to John of Biclarum, Segga had hands cut off (the penalty for usurpers) and was banished to Galicia.

The revolt had the support of several Visigothic counts, all Arians probably, but not rebelling necessarily out of devotion to their theological principles. The low-level conspirators were deprived of their property and offices and sent into exile, but one of the chief rebels, Vagrila, took refuge in the basilica of Saint Eulalia. Claudius was told, upon request, to give Vagrila, his family, and his possessions over to the church of Mérida, which he did. Masona, however, released Vagrila and his family and returned his property to him.

== Sources ==
- Thompson, E. A. The Goths in Spain. Oxford: Clarendon Press, 1969. ISBN 0-19-814271-4.
- Collins, Roger. Visigothic Spain, 409–711. Oxford: Blackwell Publishing, 2004. ISBN 0-631-18185-7.
- Collins, Roger. "King Leovigild and the Conversion of the Visigoths." Law, Regionalism and Culture in Early Medieval Spain. Variorum, 1992. ISBN 0-86078-308-1.
