= Niri Qaghan =

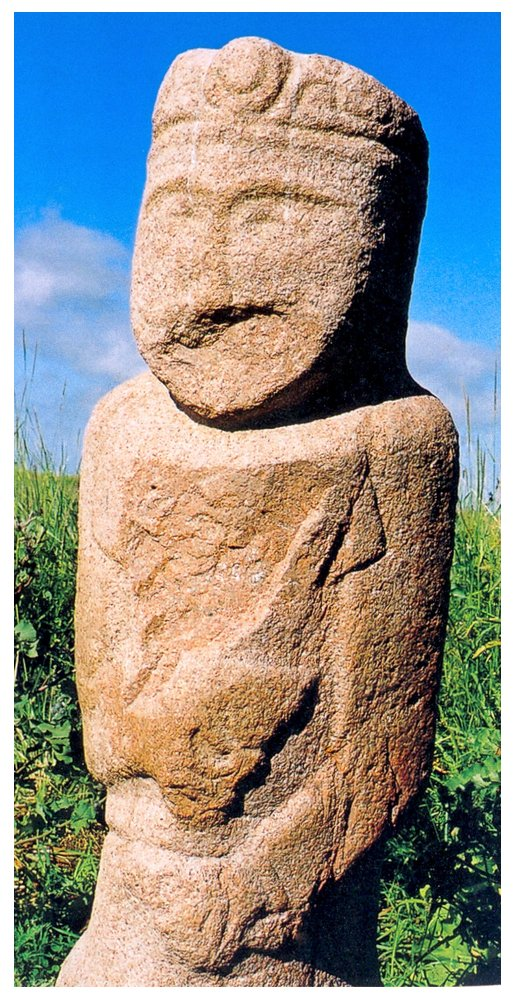
- Memorial statue of Niri Qaghan, at Mongolküre, Xinjiang, China

Qaghan of the Western Turkic Khaganate
- Reign: 587–599 or 579 – c. 602/603
- Predecessor: Apa Qaghan
- Successor: Heshana Khagan
- Died: 599 (disputed)
- Spouse: Lady Xiang (向氏)
- Issue: Heshana Khagan
- House: Ashina
- Father: Yangsu Tegin
- Religion: Buddhism

Niri Qaghan (Chinese: 泥利可汗; pinyin: Nílì Kèhán; Sogdian: 𐼎𐼘𐼊 𐼉𐼒𐼄𐼒𐼎, romanized: nry x’ɣ’n, probably Rouran: nı̣rı̣ qaɣan) was a ruler of the Western Turkic Khaganate.

== Biography ==
Niri Qaghan was the grandson of Muqan Qaghan through Yangsu Tegin. He had a younger brother named Poshi Tegin (婆實特勤). He was enthroned by his supporters in 587 as the Western Turkic Khagan, succeeding his uncle Apa Qaghan according to Book of Sui. His father was probably dead by this time. Princess Qianjin tried to forge an alliance with him by 593.

According to Christoph Baumer he ruled from 579 to c. 602/603. According to de La Vaissière, the unnamed Turkic ruler who was in correspondence with Emperor Maurice was Niri. Takashi Osawa dismissed these claims, saying Chinese authors recorded earlier events at a very late time. According to him, Niri died in spring or summer of 598 during a battle against the Tiele and his second funeral ceremony could be held in autumn or winter of 599 at the latest.

== Family ==
His sons included Heshana Khagan and Kuta Shad (Chinese: 闕達設; pinyin: Quèdá Shè). His Chinese wife Lady Xiang (向氏) was married to his brother Poshi Tegin (婆實特勤) after his death and was sent by his son Heshana Qaghan as ambassadors to China during end of the Kaiyuan era.

== Legacy ==
His memorial complex and statue which was found in 1953 in Zhaosu County, Xinjiang. Later, inscriptions were found at the west part of the stone statue. Sogdian text was read by Yutaka Yoshida (Kyoto university), and later by Takashi Osawa (Osaka University). De La Vaissere associated his name with the Niri Khagan read in the inscription of Hüis Tolgoi. Lev Gumilev erroneously associated him with Birmudha figure found in Iranian stories about Bahram Chubin and Sawa and connected him to governorship of Paykend. Shamsuddin Kamoluddin also argued that Niri Khagan was identical to El-Tigin found in Persian and Arabic sources.
