= 547 =

Calendar year

547 in various calendars
- Gregorian calendar: 547; DXLVII
- Ab urbe condita: 1300
- Assyrian calendar: 5297
- Balinese saka calendar: 468–469
- Bengali calendar: −47 – −46
- Berber calendar: 1497
- Buddhist calendar: 1091
- Burmese calendar: −91
- Byzantine calendar: 6055–6056
- Chinese calendar: 丙寅年 (Fire Tiger); 3244 or 3037 — to — 丁卯年 (Fire Rabbit); 3245 or 3038
- Coptic calendar: 263–264
- Discordian calendar: 1713
- Ethiopian calendar: 539–540
- Hebrew calendar: 4307–4308
- Hindu calendars
- Vikram Samvat: 603–604
- Shaka Samvat: 468–469
- Kali Yuga: 3647–3648
- Holocene calendar: 10547
- Iranian calendar: 75 BP – 74 BP
- Islamic calendar: 77 BH – 76 BH
- Javanese calendar: 435–436
- Julian calendar: 547; DXLVII
- Korean calendar: 2880
- Minguo calendar: 1365 before ROC 民前1365年
- Nanakshahi calendar: −921
- Seleucid era: 858/859 AG
- Thai solar calendar: 1089–1090
- Tibetan calendar: མེ་ཕོ་སྟག་ལོ་ (male Fire-Tiger); 673 or 292 or −480 — to — མེ་མོ་ཡོས་ལོ་ (female Fire-Hare); 674 or 293 or −479

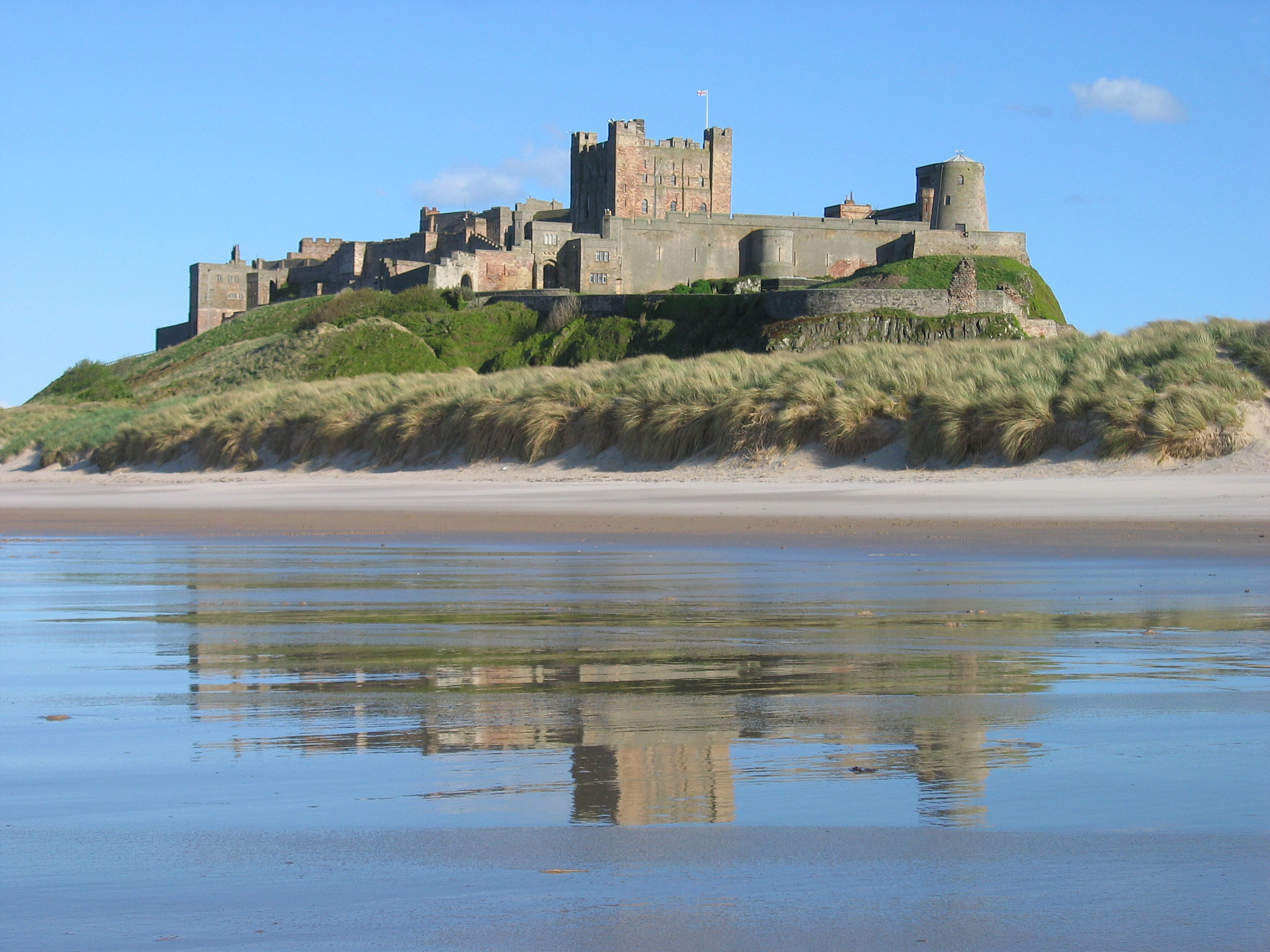
Bamburgh Castle in Northumberland (England)

Year 547 (DXLVII) was a common year starting on Tuesday of the Julian calendar. The denomination 547 for this year has been used since the early medieval period, when the Anno Domini calendar era became the prevalent method in Europe for naming years.

== Events ==
=== By place ===
==== Europe ====
- Gothic War: Belisarius recaptures Rome from the Ostrogoths, but his Italian campaign is unsuccessful (he is starved of supplies and reinforcements from Constantinople).
- The mosaic panels of Justinian I and Theodora I with attendants, in the Basilica of San Vitale (Ravenna), are made (approximate date).
- Theudebald, age 13, succeeds his father Theudebert I after a reign of 14 years, and becomes king of Austrasia (or 548).

==== Britain ====
- King Ida establishes the kingdom of Bernicia. He builds Bamburgh Castle (northeast England) as a fortress that will become the seat of Anglo-Saxon kings (according to the Historia Brittonum).

==== Africa ====
- Battle of Marta: The Byzantine army under John Troglita is defeated by Moorish tribes in Tripolitania. He flees to Lunci (9 km south of Mahares), and is forced to withdraw north to the fortress of Laribus (near modern El Kef).

==== Asia ====
- The Tonkin revolt (Vietnam), led by Lý Nam Đế, is suppressed by the Chinese Liang dynasty.

=== By topic ===
==== Religion ====
- The Basilica of San Vitale (Ravenna) is consecrated by bishop Maximianus of Ravenna.

== Births ==
- Pei Ju, official of the Sui dynasty and Tang dynasty (d. 627)
- Zhu Manyue, empress of Northern Zhou (d. 586)

== Deaths ==
- February 10 – Scholastica, Christian nun
- March 21 – Saint Benedict, Patron Saint of Europe, twin brother of St Scholastica, famous for building the Monastery of Mt Cassino and for his Benedictine Monastic Rule
- Gao Huan, general of Northern Wei (b. 496)
- Maelgwn Hir ap Cadwallon, king of Gwynedd (traditional date)
- Theudebert I, king of Austrasia (or 548)
- Tribonian, Byzantine jurist and author of the Codex Justinianus
