= Liuva II =

Visigothic king

- King of Hispania, Septimania and Gallaecia
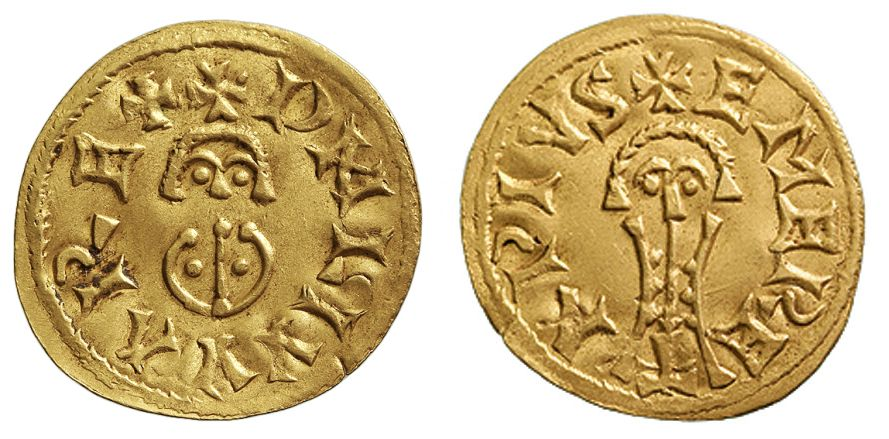
- Tremissis from Mérida, minted during his reign

King of the Visigoths
- Reign: 21 December 601 – c. June 603
- Predecessor: Reccared I
- Successor: Witteric
- Born: c. 584
- Died: c. July 603 (aged 19)
- Father: Reccared I
- Mother: Baddo
- Religion: Chalcedonian Christianity

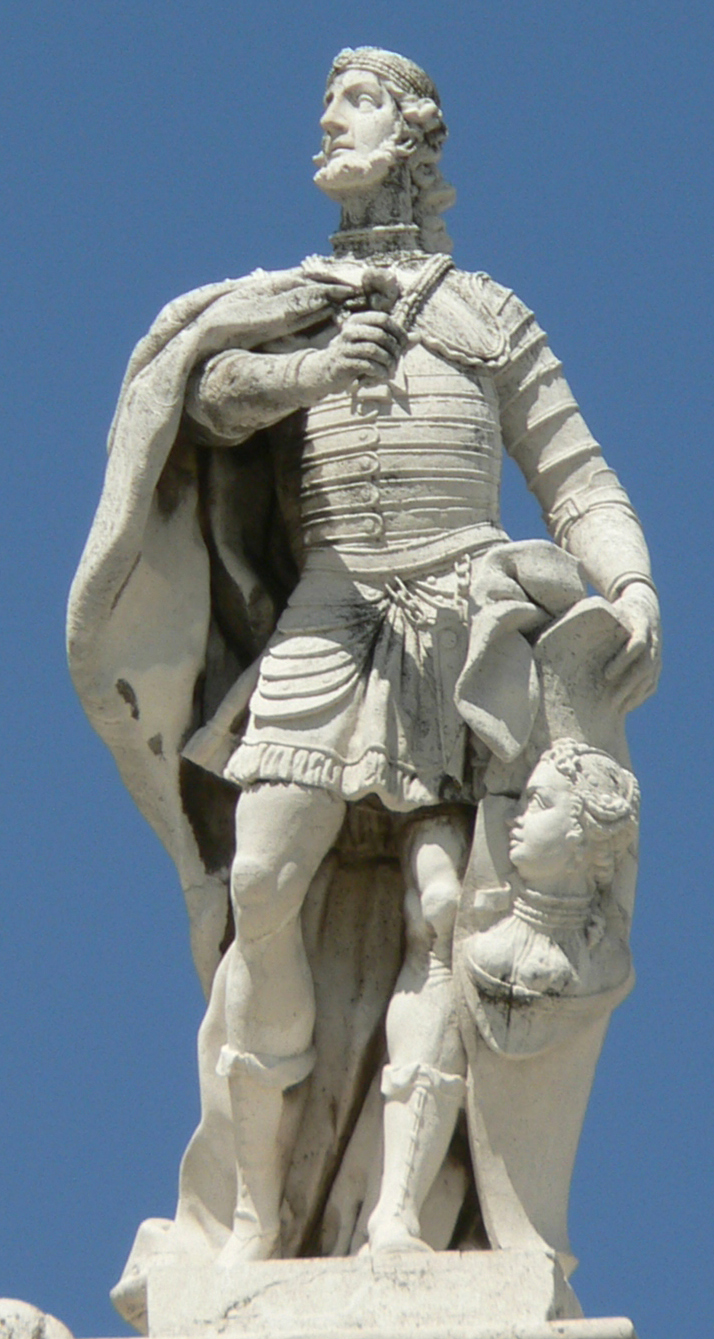
A fanciful image of Liuva II on the facade of the Royal Palace of Madrid expresses the claim of the Spanish monarchy to represent Visigoth antecedents

Liuva II (Gothic: 𐌻𐌹𐌿𐌱𐌰, Liuba) (c. 584 – June/July 603), son of Reccared I and possibly Baddo, was Visigothic King of Hispania, Septimania and Gallaecia from 601 to 603. He succeeded Reccared I at only seventeen years of age.

== Reign ==
In the spring of 602, the Goth Witteric, one of the conspirators with Sunna de Mérida to reestablish Arianism in 589, was given command of the army to repulse the Byzantines. From his position of power at the head of the army, he surrounded himself with people in his confidence. When it came time to expel the Byzantines, Witteric instead used his troops to strike at the king in the spring of 603. Invading the royal palace, and deposing the young king, he counted on the support of a faction of nobles in opposition to the dynasty of Leovigild. Witteric cut off the king's right hand, punishment that prevented him from being king, and later had him condemned to death and executed in the summer of 603.

Regnal titles
Preceded by Reccared I	King of the Visigoths; December 601 – June/July 603	Succeeded by Witteric
