= Bagha Qaghan =

Bagha Khagan
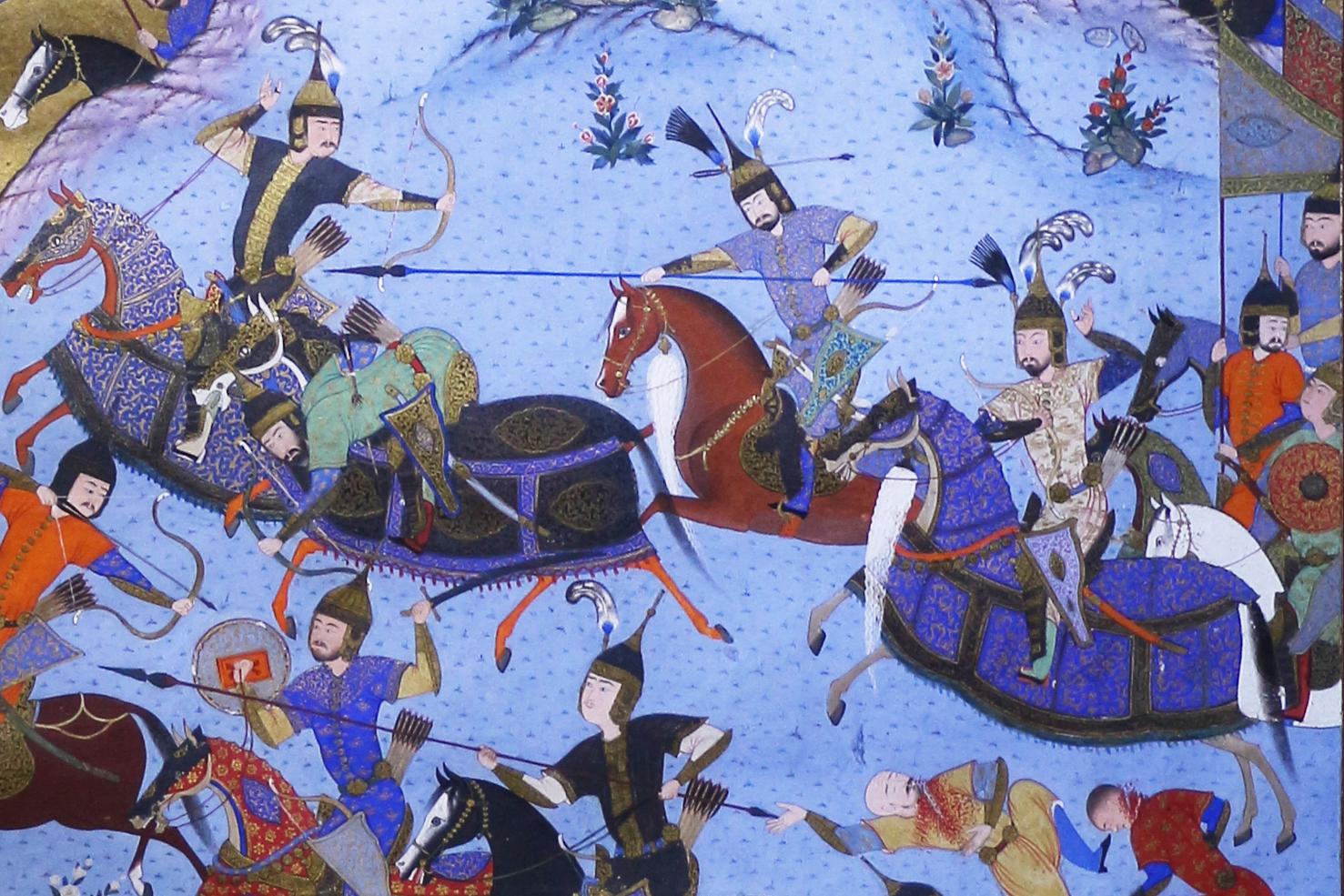
- Shahnameh illustration of Bahram Chobin and Saveh (allegedly, Bagha) fighting

Qaghan of the First Turkic Khaganate
- Reign: 587–588
- Predecessor: Ishbara Qaghan
- Successor: Tulan Qaghan
- Died: 588
- Spouse: Princess Qianjin
Names
- Ashina Chuluohuo (阿史那處羅侯)
Regnal name
- Bagha Qaghan (莫何可汗)
- House: Ashina
- Dynasty: First Turkic Khaganate
- Father: Issik Qaghan
- Religion: Tengrism

Bagha Qaghan (Chinese: 莫何可汗; pinyin: Mòhé Kèhán), personal name Ashina Chuluohou (阿史那處羅侯), was the seventh qaghan of the First Turkic Khaganate. He has been erroneously associated with Šāwa, Sāva, or Sāba in Persian sources.

== Biography ==
=== Early life ===
Bagha Qaghan was the second son of Issik Qaghan and was probably born sometime between 540 and 550. His personal name was recorded as Ashina Chuluohou (阿史那处罗侯) in Chinese sources, which was probably rendering of the Turkic name Čoluq (crippled or lame).

He was made Töli shad (Chinese: 突利設) by his elder brother Ishbara Qaghan in 581, thus receiving viceroyalty over eastern wing of the empire. Probably around this time he also came to be known as Yabghu Khagan (Chinese: 葉護可汗). He married Princess Qianjin in a levirate marriage. During this time, Emperor Wen of Sui used Zhangsun Sheng (長孫晟), a companion of Princess Qianjin, to sow discord among the Göktürks. According to his report, Chuluohou was cunning, but weak in power. He had earned the hearts of the people, which made Ishbara jealous and uneasy, despite outward appearances suggesting otherwise. In reality, Ishbara harbored deep suspicions and fears.

=== Reign ===
He was appointed heir by Ishbara sometime before 587 in his will. When Ishbara died, a messenger was sent by Ashina Yongyulü to his uncle, to fulfill the will and invite him to ascend the throne. However, Chuluohou stated that in recent generations, the Göktürks had not adhered to lateral succession, and it would not be in accordance with tradition for him to take the throne while Ishbara's son was still alive. He requested Yongyulü to ascend the throne instead and declared his allegiance to him. However, Yongyulü did not accept the request and insisted on carrying out his father's will. Bagha Qaghan made his nephew a yabgu after his coronation.

Bagha continued his predecessor's alliance policy with the Sui dynasty and focused on removing rivals. He moved on to eliminate Apa Qaghan who by that time had fortified himself near Bukhara and captured him alive. Permission was requested from the Sui emperor to kill the captured Apa, but Zhangsun Sheng opposed the idea, urging the Emperor to keep him alive to keep the Göktürks in check.

=== Death ===
In some Turkish sources, Baga Khagan, organized an expedition to the Western Gokturk State to defeat Tardu and restore the unity of the state, and may have been defeated and killed by Tardu's army. According to Josef Markwart and Denis Sinor, he may have been the 'great kaghan' that was killed with an arrow by Persian commander Bahrām Chobin during the First Perso-Turkic War which happened in August 589 (date by Gumilev). Peter Golden regarded this to be unlikely, considering several sources stating he died the previous year in a battle with Tardu in 588 AD.

== Family ==
Zhu Zhenhong identified his son from the stele of Shi Danai as Ashina Tong (阿史那統) who served as Shiduo Gongmi Shad and had the title of Grand Master of the Palace (光祿大夫). Through Tong, Bagha Qaghan was grandfather of the Tang dynasty general Shi Danai.

== Sources ==
- Sims-Williams, Nicholas (2009). "KADAGISTĀN". Encyclopaedia Iranica, Vol. XV, Fasc. 3. London et al. pp. 324–325.
- Rezakhani, Khodadad (2017). ReOrienting the Sasanians: East Iran in Late Antiquity. Edinburgh University Press. pp. 1–256. ISBN 9781474400305.
- Frye, Richard Nelson (1984). The History of Ancient Iran. C.H.Beck. pp. 1–411. ISBN 9783406093975.
- Shahbazi, A. Sh. (1988). "Bahrām VI Čōbīn". Encyclopaedia Iranica, Vol. III, Fasc. 5. London et al. pp. 514–522.
- Litvinsky, B. A.; Dani, Ahmad Hasan (1996). History of Civilizations of Central Asia: The crossroads of civilizations, A.D. 250 to 750. UNESCO. pp. 1–569. ISBN 9789231032110.
- Bivar, A. D. H. (2003). "Hephthalites". Encyclopaedia Iranica, Vol. XII, Fasc. 2. London et al. pp. 198–201.
- Howard-Johnston, James. "ḴOSROW II". Encyclopaedia Iranica, Online Edition.
- Jaques, Tony (2007). Dictionary of Battles and Sieges: F-O. Greenwood Publishing Group. pp. 1–1354. ISBN 9780313335389.

Bagha Qaghan Ashina Clan
Preceded by Ishbara Khagan	Khagan of the Turkic Kaganate; 587–589	Succeeded by Tulan Khagan
