= Athaloc =

Arian Bishop

Athaloc was the Visigothic Arian Archbishop of Narbonne at the time of the Third Council of Toledo in 589. He was the metropolitan of his province in parallel with the Catholic hierarchy.

Early in 589, Reccared I sent word of his conversion to Catholicism to Septimania, where it incited a rebellion on behalf of Arianism by two prominent counts, Granista and Wildigern, and the bishop Athaloc. The rebels sought to overthrow Reccared and the Catholic faith and to this end they called in the aid of the Catholic and Frankish king of Burgundy, Guntram. The Frankish army under Boso, however, was destroyed by Claudius, Duke of Lusitania. Many Catholics died in the process of the rebellion. Athaloc, however, was not deposed and died a natural death. He never converted to Catholicism.

== See also ==
- Christianity in France

== Sources ==
- Thompson, E. A. The Goths in Spain. Oxford: Clarendon Press, 1969.
- Collins, Roger. "King Leovigild and the Conversion of the Visigoths." Law, Regionalism and Culture in Early Medieval Spain. Variorum, 1992. ISBN 0-86078-308-1
