= Claudius, Duke of Lusitania =

Hispano-Roman Catholic dux (duke) of Lusitania

Claudius was a Hispano-Roman Catholic dux (duke) of Lusitania (or dux Emeretensis civitatis) in the late sixth century. He was one of the most successful generals of Reccared I.

In 587, after a count named Witteric had exposed the plot of Sunna, the Arian bishop of Mérida, to place the Visigoth Segga on the throne and probably to also kill the Catholic Méridan bishop Masona, Claudius was sent to put down the revolt. Segga was captured, his hands cut off (the penalty for usurpers), and banished to Galicia. The less important conspirators were deprived of their property and offices and sent into exile, but one of the chief rebels, Vagrila, took refuge in the basilica of Saint Eulalia. Claudius was told, upon request, to give Vagrila, his family, and his possessions over to the church of Mérida, which he did. Masona, however, released Vagrila and his family and returned his property to him.

In 589, when the Frankish king Guntram sent an army under the general Boso into Septimania in support of a rebellion by the Arian archbishop Athaloc, Claudius was sent by King Reccared to defeat it. Near Carcassonne on the river Aude, Claudius surprised the Franks and routed them, killing 5,000 and capturing 2,000, as well as their camp. According to Isidore of Seville, nulla umquam in Hispaniis Gothorum uictoria uel maior in bello vel similis extitit: "No victory of the Goths in Spain was ever greater or even equal to it." The chronicler John of Biclarum, with even more excitement, exaggerated his figures to make Claudius, the next Gideon, defeat 60,000 Franks (the evil Midianites in the biblical metaphor) with merely 300 men.

== Sources ==
- Thompson, E. A. The Goths in Spain. Oxford: Clarendon Press, 1969. ISBN 0-19-814271-4
- Collins, Roger. Visigothic Spain, 409–711. Oxford: Blackwell Publishing, 2004. ISBN 0-631-18185-7
- Collins, Roger. "King Leovigild and the Conversion of the Visigoths." Law, Regionalism and Culture in Early Medieval Spain. Variorum, 1992. ISBN 0-86078-308-1
- Fontaine, Jacques. "King Sisebut's Vita Desiderii and the Political Function of Visigothic Hagiography." Visigothic Spain. ed. Edward James. Oxford: Oxford University Press, 1980. ISBN 0-19-822543-1
