= Ishbara Qaghan =

Qaghan of the First Turkic Khaganate
- Reign: 581–587
- Predecessor: Ashina Anluo
- Successor: Bagha Qaghan
- Born: c. 540
- Died: 587 (aged 46–47)
- Spouse: Princess Qianjin
- Issue: Tulan Qaghan; Yami Qaghan
Names
- Ashina Shetu (阿史那攝圖)
Regnal name
- Il Kül Shad Bagha Ishbara Qaghan (伊利俱盧設莫何始波羅可汗)
- House: Ashina
- Dynasty: First Turkic Khaganate
- Father: Issik Qaghan
- Religion: Tengrism

Ishbara Qaghan (Old Turkic: 𐰃𐱁𐰉𐰺𐰀:𐰴𐰍𐰣, romanized: Ïšbara qaɣan; Chinese: 沙缽略可汗; pinyin: Shābōlüè Kèhán; Wade–Giles: Sha-po-lüeh K'o-han; c. 540 – 587), personal name Ashina Shetu (阿史那攝圖), full regnal name Il Kül Shad Bagha Ishbara Qaghan (伊利俱盧設莫何始波羅可汗), was a qaghan of the First Turkic Khaganate. He was the first son of Issik Qaghan and a grandson of Bumin Qaghan.

== Name ==
His birth name was recorded as either Ashina Shetu or Nietu (Chinese: 阿史那攝圖) in Chinese sources. His name is written in Sogdian: 𐼎𐼇𐼒𐼒𐼘, romanized: nw’’r, lit. 'Neber' in Bugut Inscription. Gerard Clauson and Peter Golden argued that name is non-Turkic. (Note: as indicated by the mostly non-native initial n-. According to Clauson (1972:774), "[t]he only basic Turkish words beginning with n- are ne: and ne:ŋ, and even ne:ŋ is ultimate der. fr. ne:")

Ashina Zhong's tomb epitaph portrays him as a son of Yongzhou Qaghan (Chinese: 邕周, romanized: Yōngzhōu) and a grandson of Dayuan (Chinese: 大原, romanized: Dàyuán). Wu Yugui argued that they were Ishbara Qaghan and Issik Qaghan respectively.

== Biography ==
=== Under Taspar ===
He was probably born c. 540 to Issik Qaghan. He was made Erfu Khagan (Chinese: 爾伏可汗) in east in 572 by Taspar Qaghan.

=== Reign ===
He was raised to the throne after resignation of Ashina Anluo by the high council as the legal resolution to the crisis created by his uncle Taspar Qaghan who had bequeathed the title of khagan to his nephew Talopien (son of Muqan Qaghan). This act violated the traditional system of lateral succession which went from oldest brother to youngest brother and oldest son to youngest. He took the regnal name Illig Kül Shad Bagha Ishbara Khagan (Chinese: 伊利俱盧設莫何始波羅可汗; pinyin: Yīlì Jùlú Shè Mòhé Shǐbōluó Kèhàn) and started to rule from Ötüken. According to the Tongdian, he was also known as the Great Khagan (Chinese: 大可汗; pinyin: Dà Kèhán).

==== Administration ====
Immediately after his appointment, the legal basis of his power was contested by Talopien. He made his predecessor Anluo Dier Khagan (Chinese: 第二可汗; pinyin: Dìèr Kèhán) and granted him the Tuul River valley (now in Mongolia). Talopien also demanded a title and as a result he was made Apa Khagan (Chinese: 阿波可汗; pinyin: Ābō Kèhán) and was granted the steppe between northern Mongolia and the Altai Mountains. Another relative, Tardu, was continuing as the ruler of the western wing under Ishbara. There was another lesser khagan under Ishbara called Tamgan (Chinese: 貪汗可汗; pinyin: Tānhàn Kèhán) who could have been a younger brother of Talopien. Ishbara made his younger brother Ashina Chuluohou the Töli shad (Chinese: 突利設), thus granting viceroyalty over the eastern wing of the empire. Other relatives were also granted lands and tribes, namely Tigin Shad (Chinese: 地勤察), Liji Shad (Chinese: 利稽察) and Suopi Shad (Chinese: 娑毗設),

==== Chinese policy ====
He later married Princess Qianjin of Northern Zhou in 581 in a levirate marriage and accepted refugees from the Northern Qi, two moves that were undertaken to legitimize his authority. Meanwhile the Northern Zhou was overpowered by the Sui dynasty and all the Yuwen clan were put to death. Incited by his wife, Ishbara started a campaign against new Sui dynasty. He was allied with Gao Baoning (高寶寧), a former Northern Qi general who was still holding Ying Province (營州, roughly modern Zhaoyang, Liaoning). In response, under advice from the general Zhangsun Sheng (長孫晟), the new emperor Wen of Sui carried out the strategy of placating Ishbara's subordinates Tardu, Apa and Bagha.

In 582, Ishbara marched on the Sui dynasty with support from Apa and Tamgan, while Wen responded by sending his cousin Yang Hong (Chinese: 楊弘), his brother-in-law Dou Rongding (窦荣定), Dou Luji (豆盧勣), Gao Jiong and Yu Qingze (虞庆则). The Göktürks were defeated in a battle near Baidao (白道, north of modern Hohhot). Defeat was followed by hunger and disease. This highly unstable situation quickly became a civil war, which the Sui took advantage of to weaken the Göktürks.

Wen of Sui used Zhangsun Sheng (長孫晟), a companion of Princess Qianjin, to sow discord among Göktürks. He became a friend of Ishbara, and spent many years with the Göktürks. His knowledge about the customs and institutions of the Göktürks was of great importance to the Sui. In his report to the Emperor, Zhangsun described Ishbara as a person whose military strength was formidable but was susceptible to internal conflicts. According to his report, "Chuluohou, Shetu's brother, though cunning, is weak in power. He has earned the hearts of the people, which has made Shetu jealous and uneasy, despite outward appearances suggesting otherwise. In reality, he harbors deep suspicions and fears. Apa Khagan is timid and positioned between these factions. He somewhat fears Shetu and follows his lead, but his loyalty is uncertain." Wen also sent regalia to Tardu and sat his envoy in a more prestigious position to Ishbara's in his court, causing further discord.

Ishbara led another attack against the Sui in 583. Surprisingly for Ishbara, Tardu left with his army in mid-march. Ashina Rangan, who was approached by Zhangsun Sheng sent false news about a revolt of the Tiele to Ishbara, causing him to retreat. Later that year, Ishbara led another force against the Sui. Wen sent his brother Yang Shuang (楊爽) in response. Yang Shuang achieved a great victory, and part of his army, commanded by the general Yin Shou (陰壽), defeated Gao Baoning, forcing Gao to try to flee to the Khitan, but on the way, Gao was killed by his subordinates, ending the last bit of Northern Qi resistance. Apa Qaghan on the other hand was tricked by Zhangsun Sheng, who told him that Tardu already submitted to the Sui dynasty and Ishbara was preparing to attack Apa's camp, leading him to submit to the Sui.

As Zhangsun guessed, Ishbara attacked Apa's camp in 583 and killed his mother during the raid. Having nowhere to turn, Apa fled west to seek refuge with Tardu. Tamgan and Tigin Shad also switched their allegiances away from Ishbara. Apa soon was given an army by Tardu and took Kucha and Kumul. Settling in the Ili Valley, he increased his power to the point of appointing a lesser khagan to west wing of his territories. Ishbara on the other hand, in order to end the civil war, finally acknowledged the Sui dynasty as his overlord. Wen in his turn adopted Princess Qianjin of Northern Zhou and gave her a new title – Princess Dayi. Ishbara asked for support from the Sui, sending his son Kuhezhen as emissary. As a result, he defeated Apa in 585 with Sui support and subdued a Tiele revolt.

He died in 587 after a long illness. He appointed his younger brother Chuluohou as his successor, however he refused the throne, instead submitting to Tulan, Ishbara's eldest son.

== Family ==
He was married to his uncle's widow Princess Qianjin of Northern Zhou. However, his children aren't confirmed to be with her:

1. Tulan Qaghan (r. 588–599)
2. Yami Qaghan (r. 603–609)
3. Kuhezhen Tegin (庫合真特勒) – Ambassador to China in 585.
4. Rudan Tegin (褥但特勒) – Ambassador to China in 593.

== Sources ==
- Christoph Baumer, History of Central Asia, v. 2, pp. 174–206 (full history of the Turkic Khaganate)

=== Notations ===
- The Turks / editors, Hasan Celal Güzel, C. Cem Oğuz, Osman Karatay. Other author Güzel, Hasan Celâl. Oğuz, Cem. Karatay, Osman, 1971– Ocak, Murat. Imprint Ankara : Yeni Türkiye, 2002. ISBN 975-6782-55-2 (set)
  Ishbara Qaghan Ashina Clan
  | Preceded by Taspar Qaghan | Khagan of the Turkic Khaganate; 581–587 | Succeeded by Bagha Qaghan |
