= Reccared I =

Visigothic King

- King of Hispania, Septimania and Gallaecia
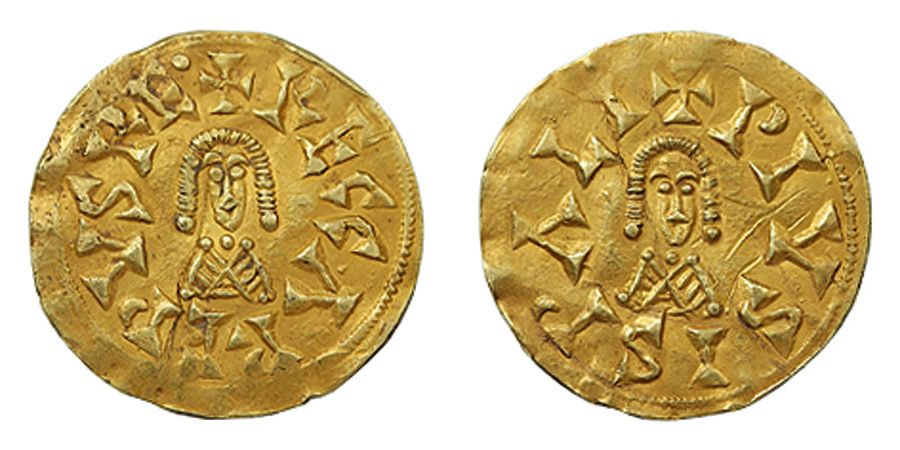
- Tremissis of Reccared bearing his effigy

King of the Visigoths
- Reign: 21 April 586 – 21 December 601
- Predecessor: Liuvigild
- Successor: Liuva II
- Born: c. 559 AD; Hispania
- Died: 21 December 601 (aged 42); Toledo, Hispania
- Spouse: Baddo
- Issue: Liuva II; Suintila; Geila
Names
- Flavius Reccaredus
- Father: Liuvigild
- Mother: Theodosia
- Religion: Arianism (before 587); Chalcedonian Christianity (after 587)

Reccared I (or Recared; Latin: Flavius Reccaredus; Spanish: Flavio Recaredo; c. 559 – December 601; reigned 586–601) was the king of the Visigoths, ruling in Hispania, Gallaecia and Septimania. His reign marked a climactic shift in history, with the king's renunciation of Arianism in favour of Catholic Christianity in 587.

== Reign ==
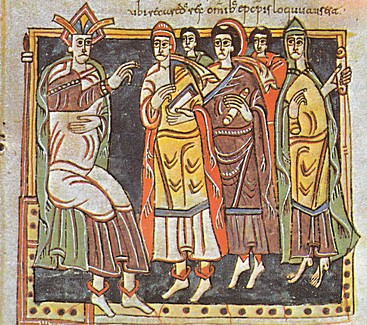
Reccared and bishops at the Third Council of Toledo, from the Codice Vigilano

Reccared was the younger son of King Leovigild by his first wife. Like his father, Reccared had his capital at Toledo. The Visigothic kings and nobles were traditionally Arian Christians, while the Hispano-Roman population were Catholic Christians. The bishop Leander of Seville was instrumental in converting the elder son and heir of Leovigild, Hermenegild, to Chalcedonianism. Leander supported his rebellion and was exiled for his role.

When King Leovigild died, within a few weeks of April 21, 586, bishop Leander was swift to return to Toledo. The new king had been associated with his father in ruling the kingdom and was acclaimed king by the Visigothic nobles without opposition.

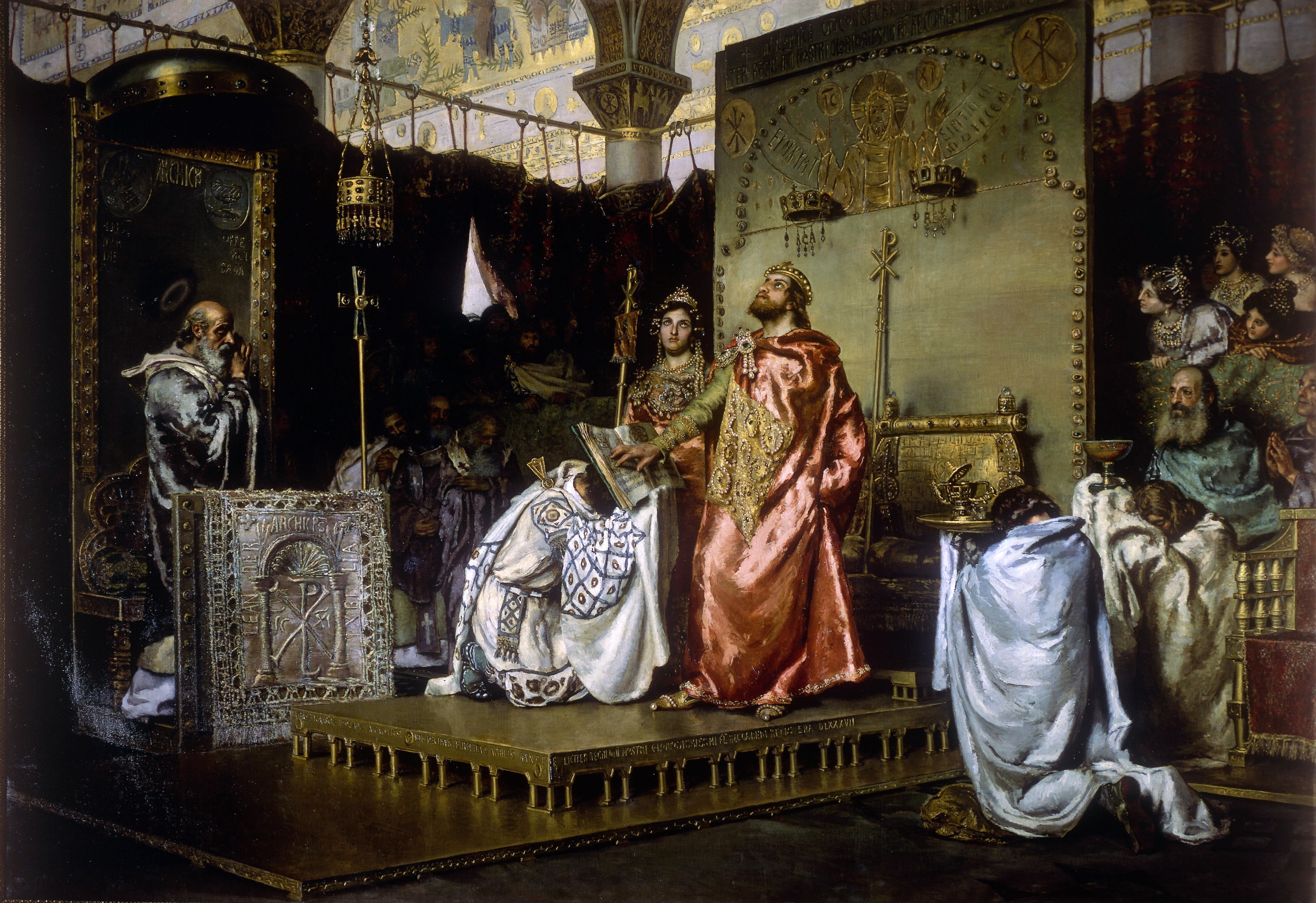
Conversion of Reccared to Catholicism by Antonio Muñoz Degrain (1888)

In January 587, Reccared renounced Arianism for Chalcedonianism, the single great event of his reign and the turning point for Visigothic Hispania. Most Arian nobles and ecclesiastics followed his example, certainly those around him at Toledo, but there were Arian uprisings, notably in Septimania, his northernmost province, beyond the Pyrenees, where the leader of opposition was the Arian bishop Athaloc, who had the reputation among his Roman enemies of being virtually a second Arius. Among the secular leaders of the Septimanian insurrection, the counts Granista and Wildigern appealed to Guntram of Burgundy, who saw his opportunity and sent his dux Desiderius. Reccared's army defeated the Arian insurgents and their Catholic allies with great slaughter, Desiderius himself being slain.

The next conspiracy broke out in the west, Lusitania, headed by the Arian Sunna, Bishop of Mérida, and count Segga. Claudius, Reccared's dux Lusitaniae, put down the rising, Sunna being banished to Mauritania and Segga retiring to Gallaecia. In the later part of 588 a third conspiracy was headed by the Arian bishop Uldila and the queen dowager Goiswintha, but they were detected, and the bishop was banished.

The Third Council of Toledo, organized by St. Leander but convened in the king's name in May 589, set the tone for the new Catholic kingdom. The public confession of the king, read aloud by a notary, reveals by the emphatic clarity of its theological points and its quotations of scripture that it was ghost-written for the king. Bishop Leander also delivered the triumphant closing sermon, which his brother Isidore entitled Homilia de triumpho ecclesiae ob conversionem Gothorum a homily upon the "triumph of the Church upon the conversion of the Goths". The text of the homily survives. Leander and the Roman bishops immediately instituted the program of forced conversion of Jews and extirpation of the remains of Arianism as heresy. Catholic history traditionally imputes these persecutions to the Visigothic kings. When, after Reccared's reign, at a synod held at Toledo in 633, the bishops took upon themselves the nobles' right to select a king from among the royal family, the transfer of power was complete. By this time the remaining ethnic distinction between the increasingly Romanized Visigoths and their Hispano-Roman subjects had all but disappeared (the Gothic language lost its last and probably already declining function as a church language with the extirpation of Arianism, and dress and funerary customs also cease to be distinguishing features in ca. 570/580)

Reportedly Reccared engaged in a vigorous policy against the Jews, pursuing zealous and fanatical policies limiting Jewish freedoms as promulgated in the canons of synods. Modern historians have revised this view and see a continuation of traditional Visigothic tolerance. Pope Gregory I was convinced that Reccared refused bribes from the Jewish community, which was large, well-connected throughout the Mediterranean and powerful, and Reccared's laws provided that the offspring of a Christian and a Jew be baptised, which was of little moment to the Jewish community, as whether it was not born of a Jewish mother or was born of a Jewish woman outside her community, the child was not considered a Jew anyway. Reccared eliminated the death penalty for Jews convicted of proselytising among Christians and ignored Gregory's request that the trade in Christian slaves at Narbonne be forbidden to Jews. Among the canons of five synods during Reccared's reign, E. A. Thompson could find none disadvantaging the Jewish community.

The information for the rest of Reccared's reign is scanty. John of Biclaro, Reccared's contemporary, ends his account with the Third Council of Toledo. Isidore of Seville, bishop Leander's brother, praises his peaceful government, clemency, and generosity: standard encomia. He returned various properties, even some private ones, that had been confiscated by his father, and founded many churches and monasteries. Pope Gregory, writing to Reccared in August 599 (Epp. ix. 61, 122), extols him for embracing the true faith and inducing his people to do so, and notably for refusing the bribes offered by Jews to procure the repeal of a law against them. He sent Reccared a piece of the True Cross, some fragments of the chains of St. Peter, and some hairs of St. John the Baptist.

Reccared was married to Baddo and possibly to Chlodoswintha. He died a natural death at Toledo and was succeeded by his youthful son Liuva II.

== Notes ==
Regnal titles
Preceded by Liuvigild	King of the Visigoths; 21 April 586 – December 601	Succeeded by Liuva II
