= Princess Qianjin =

- Died: 593
- Cause of death: Executed
- Other name: Princess Dayi (大義公主)
- Spouses: Taspar Qaghan; Ishbara Qaghan; Tulan Qaghan

Princess Qianjin (Chinese: 千金公主) was a princess of the Northern Zhou dynasty and a poet. She was the wife of Taspar Qaghan, Ishbara Qaghan and Tulan Qaghan. She was killed by her husband in a political conflict. She was later bestowed the imperial surname Yang (楊) by the Sui dynasty and granted the title Princess Dayi (大義公主).

== Biography ==
Princess Qianjin was born to Yuwen Zhao, Prince of Zhao, the seventh son of Yuwen Tai.

In 579, Taspar Qaghan hoped to ally with the Northern Zhou through marriage. Emperor Xuan sent Taspar his cousin Princess Qianjin in return for a Northern Qi prince, an enemy of the Zhou who had taken refuge among the Göktürks. Taspar and Qianjin married after the traditional nomadic continual marriage. Later that year, the Northern Zhou were defeated and the Sui dynasty was established. In this attack, Qianjin's father, three brothers, and two uncles were executed.

Qianjin mourned the deaths of her family members and tried to convince Taspar to attack the Sui. After Taspar's death, she married his successor, Ishbara Qaghan, whom she persuaded to attack the Sui in 582. The Göktürks joined forces with Yingzhou officer Gao Baoning to attack the Sui, prompting the Sui Emperor to fortify the Great Wall.

The Sui hoped to ally themselves with Ishbara, so Ishbara appointed an ambassador. This angered Apa Qaghan, who gathered his forces to defeat Ishbara. In response to this, Qianjin wrote to Emperor Wen, expressing her submission as a preliminary act of outreach. Through their correspondence, Ishbara proposed that Emperor Wen be considered Qianjin's father, making the Emperor his father-in-law and allying the Göktürks and Sui. Emperor Wen accepted the terms and sent an envoy to visit his "daughter". Emperor Wen also changed Qiajin's name to Princess Dayi and bestowed on her the Sui imperial family surname Yang. Qianjin went on to provide the Sui with diplomatic advice, urging them not to request ritual indications of Ishbara's status as a son-in-law.

After Ishbara died in 587, his brother Chuluohou ruled briefly. Following his death the next year, Dayi married her third husband Ishbara's son and the new ruler, Tulan Qaghan.

In 593, a Chinese turncoat fled to the Göktürks with claims that the former rulers of the Northern Zhou dynasty, the Yuwen family, were plotting to attack the Sui. While these rumors were false, Dayi's marriage may have been harmed by these claims.

In 589, Emperor Wen sent Dayi a room panel belonging to the recently destroyed Chen dynasty. This gift disheartened her, and she wrote a poem expressing her sorrow. When Emperor Wen learned of this poem, he was displeased. When she was suspected of resuming contact with the Western Turkic Khaganate, Emperor Wen feared an attack on the Sui.

In 593, when Yami Qaghan contacted the Sui regarding a marriage alliance after the death of his first wife, they replied with the demand that Dayi be killed. Ultimately, Tulan decided to kill Dayi in her tent. The cause of this decision was unclear, with some sources claiming it was because she gossiped about Tulan, and others claimed Tulan was slandered. Others claim that she had committed adultery. Although Tulan also requested a Sui wife, he was denied.
