= Tulan Qaghan =

Tulan Khagan

Qaghan of the First Turkic Khaganate
- Reign: 589–599
- Predecessor: Bagha Qaghan
- Successor: Tardu
- Died: 599
- Spouse: Princess Qianjin
- House: Ashina
- Father: Ishbara Qaghan
- Religion: Tengrism

Tulan Qaghan (Chinese: 都蘭可汗/都兰可汗, Pinyin: dōulán kěhàn, Wade-Giles: tu-lan k'o-han, Middle Chinese (Guangyun): [tu˥lɑn˩ kʰɑ˥ɣɑn˩˥], personal name: 阿史那雍虞閭/阿史那雍虞闾, āshǐnà yōngyúlǘ, a-shih-na yung-yü-lü) was the seventh qaghan of the First Turkic Khaganate and the son of Ishbara Qaghan.

== Reign ==
In 593, Tulan Qaghan gained enough power to stop paying taxes to Emperor Wendi. His wife Princess Qianjin secretly plotted with the Tulan's rival Yami (brother or nephew of Tulan who claimed the throne in 593) to attack the Sui dynasty when her husband refused to do so. This plot was exposed by Chang sun-sheng, a spy of the Sui dynasty, Tulan had Princess Qianjin had executed. Tulan Qaghan combined his forces with Tardu in 599 and launched an invasion of the Sui, but he was assassinated by his own men in 599.

== Family ==
He married his father's wife, Northern Zhou's Princess Qianjin, now known under the Sui dynasty title Princess Dayi. Her new name was given to her by the Sui Emperor Wendi to create a marriage alliance with the Göktürks.

Tulan Qaghan Ashina Clan
Preceded by Bagha Qaghan	Khagan of the Turkic Khaganate; 588–599	Succeeded by Tardu
