= 600s (decade) =

Decade

The 600s decade ran from January 1, 600, to December 31, 609.

== Events ==
=== 600 ===
==== By place ====
====== Europe ======
- King Chlothar II of Neustria is defeated by his nephews, Theudebert II and Theuderic II, at Dormelles (approximate date).
- Germanic and Slavic peoples have tremendous population growth, with the Slavs colonizing the Balkan Peninsula.
- Rome continues as part of the Byzantine Empire. The Italian mainland is divided into independent cities and duchies.
- Venice continues as an independent realm, having been built up from fishing villages and settled by fugitives.
- Dorestad, lying in a fork between two branches of the Rhine, is established by the Franks as a trade center.
- King Agilulf of the Lombards and Queen Theodelinda build a palace complex at Monza, northeast of Milan.
- Moravians gain independence, by holding off the attacks from the Avars and the Franks who try to invade.
- According to the Ynglinga saga, king Ingvar Harra of Sweden invades Adalsysla (present day Lääne County in Estonia), but is killed by the locals (approximate date).
- Smallpox arrives in Western Europe for the first time (approximate date).

====== Britain ======
- The Welsh bard, Prince Aneirin of the Pennines (North West of England), writes the poem, "Y Gododdin", recording the events of the Battle of Catraeth.
- The Britons of Strathclyde (Scotland), Wales and Cornwall are all separated by the Anglo-Saxon kingdoms.

====== Asia ======
- The first of the Japanese embassies to Imperial China is sent (approximate date).
- The Persians begin to use windmills for irrigation (approximate date).
- Namri Songtsen becomes the new king of Tibet (approximate date).
- Chaturanga is played in its current form in India (approximate date).
- Yangdi, a Sui emperor, extends the Grand Canal. He reportedly assumes power by poisoning his father. Ma Shu-mou, aka Mahu, was one of the canal overseers and was said to have eaten a steamed 2-year-old child each day he worked on the canal. On completion the canal extended for 1,100 miles. 5.5 million people were pressed into service to complete the 1,550 mile canal.
- Quill pens, made from the outer feathers of crows and other large birds, became popular. The first books are printed in China.
- The oldest inscription in Mon language dated from 600 AD. later found at Wat Phorang, Thailand.
- Mu becomes king of the Korean kingdom of Baekje.

====== Meso- and South America ======
- Loma Caldera (El Salvador) erupts, burying the Maya village of Joya de Cerén (approximate date).
- The Hopewell tradition (North America) ceases to be the dominant culture (approximate date).
- The city of Teotihuacan (Central Mexico) begins to grow unstable, as they exhaust their resources until their inevitable collapse (possibly caused by the Toltec) circa 700.
- Moche culture ends in the Andes (approximate date).
- Nazca culture ends in the Andes (approximate date).
- The Wari Empire is established in The Andes (approximate date)
- The Middle Horizon period starts in the Andes.

====== Pacific Ocean ======
- Early settlers from the Marquesas build the Alakoko fishpond and taro fields on Kauai, Hawaii.

==== By topic ====
====== Arts and sciences ======
- The Germanic peoples, due to the more abundant food supply available, use the "moldboard" plow, introduced by the Slavs in Eastern Europe. The plow works the land with horses and oxen.
- Possibly the first reference to chess is made in the Persian work Karnamak-i-Artakhshatr-i-Papakan.
- 600-750 - Maguey Bloodletting Ritual, fragment of a fresco from Teotihuacan, Mexico, is made. Teotihuacan culture. It is now kept at the Cleveland Museum of Art.
- 600-900 - Palace and Temple of the Inscriptions (tomb-pyramid of K'inich Janaab' Pakal), Palenque, Mexico, are built. Maya culture.
- 600-900 - Cylindrical vessel is made. Maya culture. It is now kept at the Princeton University Art Museum, New Jersey.
- The Navigatio Sancti Brendani Abbatis (Voyage of St. Brendan the Abbott) recounts a 7-year trip to a land across the sea by the Irish saint and a band of acolytes about this time.

====== Religion ======
- Feb 16 - Pope Gregory the Great decrees "God bless You" as the religiously correct response to a sneeze.
- Pope Gregory I codifies what comes to be known as the Gregorian chant.
- Construction on the monastery of St. Catherine is begun on Mount Sinai.
- Irish missionaries preach in Scotland and Germany (approximate date).
- Chinese-influenced sculptures of Buddha begin to be created in Japan.
- Sumatra, Java, and the surrounding islands are converted to Buddhism.
- Augustine of Canterbury converts Æthelberht of Kent to Christianity (approximate date).
- Nubian rulers become Christian (approximate date).

====== World ======
- The population of the Earth rises to about 208 million people (approximate date).

=== 601 ===
==== By place ====
====== Byzantine Empire ======
- Balkan Campaign: A Byzantine army under command of Peter, brother of Emperor Maurice, crosses the Danube and advances to the Tisza River, where it defeats the Avars.

====== Europe ======
- The Franks, Merovingians and Carolingians successively control most of Europe, while strong feudal lords rise in power to gain the allegiance of the people.
- The Lombards under King Agilulf expand into Northern Italy, establishing a settlement with the Franks and maintaining intermittent relationships with Rome.
- Liuva II, age 18, succeeds his father Reccared I as king of the Visigoths. Reccared dies a natural death at the capital in Toledo after a 15-year reign.

==== By topic ====
====== Arts and sciences ======
- The Qieyun, a Chinese character rhyme dictionary, is published.

====== Agriculture ======
- Food production increases in northern and Western Europe as a result of agricultural technology introduced by the Slavs, who employ a lightweight plow with a knife blade (coulter), that cuts deep into the soil at grassroots level, together with a shaped board, or "moldboard", that moves the cut soil to one side.

====== Religion ======
- The future Archbishops of Canterbury (Mellitus, Justus, and Honorius), and the future Archbishop of York Paulinus, are sent to England by Pope Gregory I to aid Augustine in his missionary work. Gregory writes the decretal Libellus responsionum to Augustine.

=== 602 ===
==== By place ====
====== Byzantine Empire ======
- Emperor Maurice succeeds in winning over the Avars to Byzantine rule, but his campaigns against the Avars, Lombards, Persians and Slavs drain the imperial treasury, requiring an increase in taxes. He orders the troops to stay for winter beyond the Danube, but a mutiny breaks out under Phocas. He brings the Byzantine forces back over the Danube and marches on to Constantinople.
- November 27 – A civil war breaks out and Phocas enters Constantinople. Maurice is captured trying to escape; he is forced to witness the slaughter of his five sons and all his supporters, and is then executed (beheaded) after a 20-year reign. His wife, Constantina, and his three daughters are spared, and sent to a monastery. Phocas is proclaimed the new emperor of the Byzantine Empire.
- Byzantine–Persian War: King Khosrau II launches an offensive against Constantinople, to avenge Maurice's death, his "friend and father", and tries to reconquer Byzantine territory. Narses, governor of Upper Mesopotamia, rebels against Phocas at the city of Edessa and requests aid from the Persians. Khosrau sends an expeditionary force to Armenia and crosses the Euphrates.

====== Europe ======
- Spring – Witteric is appointed commander-in-chief of the Visigoth army, and receives orders from King Liuva II to expel the Byzantines from Hispania.

====== Persia ======
- Khosrau II annexes the Lakhmid Kingdom (Southern Iraq), and puts king Nu'man III to death.

====== Asia ======
- Third Chinese domination of Vietnam: The Early Lý dynasty ends; Hậu Lý Nam Đế, last ruler of Vąn Xuân (North Vietnam), abdicates the throne and becomes a vassal of the Sui dynasty.
- 602 Surb Karapet Monastery earthquake. It affected the Surb Karapet Monastery, located in the district of Taron.

==== By topic ====
====== Religion ======
- Augustine of Canterbury meets with the Welsh bishops at Aust near Chepstow. He accuses them of not adopting the Roman Christian way of dating Easter, and persuades them to accept the teaching of baptism (according to the Roman Rite).

=== 603 ===
==== By place ====
====== Europe ======
- Spring – Witteric, counting on the support of the nobles, attacks the royal palace in Toledo, and overthrows King Liuva II. He cuts off his right hand, and has him executed. Witteric becomes the new king of the Visigoths.
- King Agilulf besieges Cremona, and with the assistance of the Slavs the city is destroyed. He captures Padua and Mantua (Northern Italy); its territory is divided between the Lombard duchies of Brescia and Bergamo.
- Agilulf, under the influence of his wife Theodelinda, abandons Arianism for Catholicism, and is (with his son Adaloald) baptised in the Cathedral of Monza, where later the Iron Crown of Lombardy is installed.
- The last mention of the Roman Senate on the Italian mainland is made (according to the Gregorian register). It mentions that the Senate has acclaimed new statues of Emperor Phocas and Empress Leontia.

====== Britain ======
- Battle of Degsastan: King Æthelfrith of Northumbria defeats the combined forces of the Strathclyde Britons and Scots under Áedán mac Gabráin, establishing the supremacy of the Angles in the northern part of what will become known as the British Isles.

====== Asia ======
- Emperor Wéndi stabilises the Chinese Empire; the agricultural acreage increases greatly, and shipbuilding technology reaches a new high level.
- Prince Shōtoku of Japan establishes a twelve level cap and rank system, and is said to have authored a seventeen-article constitution.
- Rebellious Göktürks depose and kill the ambitious ruler (khagan) Tardu, of the Western Turkic Khaganate (Central Asia).
- Heshana Khan succeeds his father Tardu as ruler of the Göktürks, and levies heavy taxes on the Tiele people.

==== By topic ====
====== Religion ======
- Schuttern Abbey (Germany) is founded by the wandering Irish monk Offo.
- The future Pope Boniface III is appointed papal legate to Constantinople.

=== 604 ===
==== By place ====
====== Byzantine Empire ======
- The Avars regroup after they are almost destroyed; together with the Slavs they start pillaging through the Byzantine provinces, west and south of the Danube. Due to the new Persian war, Emperor Phocas has few imperial troops available to defend the Balkan Peninsula.
- Byzantine–Persian War: King Khosrau II captures the Byzantine positions east of the Euphrates; the Persians destroy many cities in the Levant region, after prolonged sieges such as the Byzantine fortress of Dara (modern Turkey).

====== Europe ======
- Queen Brunhilda of Austrasia conspires to have Berthoald, Mayor of the Palace, assassinated. She convinces King Theuderic II to send him to inspect the royal villae along the Seine. Brunhilda then has the noblemen who actually carried out the murder arrested and killed.
- December 25 – Battle of Ėtampes: Theuderic II, with the aid of Berthoald, defeats the Frankish forces under King Chlothar II of Neustria, at Étampes (near Paris).

====== Britain ======
- Æthelfrith of Northumbria invades Deira and kills its king, Æthelric. Prince Edwin, son of the late king Ælla of Deira (possibly a nephew of Æthelric), flees to the court of King Iago of Gwynedd (northwest Wales).
- Sæbert succeeds his father Sledd as king of Essex. He is persuaded to convert to Christianity through the intervention of his uncle, King Æthelberht of Kent.

====== Asia ======
- August 13 – Emperor Wéndi dies, age 63, presumably assassinated by his son Yángdi, after a 23-year reign in which he has attacked hereditary privilege and reduced the power of the military aristocracy. He is succeeded by Yángdi, who becomes the second emperor of the Sui dynasty.
- Prince Shotoku, imperial regent of Empress Suiko, issues a Seventeen-article constitution, based on both Confucian and Buddhist principles in Japan.

==== By topic ====
====== Religion ======
- March 12 – Pope Gregory I (the Great) dies at Rome, after a 14-year reign. He has laid the foundations which claim papal absolutism, pioneered the conversion of Britain to Roman Catholicism and enunciated what will come to be known as the "seven deadly sins". Gregory is succeeded by Sabinian as the 65th pope of the Catholic Church.
- May 26 – Augustine, Archbishop of Canterbury, is succeeded by Laurence. He is a member of the Gregorian mission (see 596).
- Æthelberht of Kent founds St. Paul's Cathedral. Mellitus is appointed the first Saxon bishop of London (and Essex).
- The See of Rochester is established, and Justus is appointed as bishop. He founds Rochester Cathedral (Kent).

=== 605 ===
==== By place ====
====== Byzantine Empire ======
- Emperor Phocas recognizes Agilulf as king of the Lombards, and signs a peace treaty. He pays a tribute and cedes Orvieto (Central Italy), among other towns. The Byzantine army is withdrawn from the Balkan Peninsula.
- Phocas has Constantina, empress consort of Maurice, and her three daughters arrested. He accuses her of conspiracy, and has them executed at Chalcedon (Bithynia).

====== Britain ======
- King Æthelfrith annexes the neighboring kingdom of Deira (Northern England). The region between the Forth and Humber rivers will hereafter be known as Northumbria, the most powerful of the Anglo-Saxon kingdoms.

====== Persia ======
- As a result of a quarrel between the Lakhmids (Southern Iraq) and King Khosrau II, the Persian frontier with Arabia is no longer guarded (approximate date).

====== Asia ======
- Emperor Yángdi orders the capital to be transferred from Chang'an to Luoyang. He begins the construction of the Grand Canal, that will link existing waterways to the new Chinese capital; it will be built by a million laborers.
- Yángdi introduces an imperial examination, designed to select the best administrative officials (after they receive the jinshi) for the state; this begins a long bureaucratic tradition of scholar-officialdom in China.
- The Zhaozhou Bridge is completed under the Sui dynasty, the earliest known fully stone open-spandrel segmental arch bridge in the world (although the earlier Roman Trajan's Bridge featured segmental arches).
- Amshuvarma becomes king of the Licchavi in Nepal. He is credited for opening trade routes to Tibet. His ruling period is known as the "Golden Period".

====== Mesoamerica ======
- Aj Ne' Yohl Mat becomes ruler (ajaw) of the Maya city of Palenque (Mexico). During his reign his kingdom is invaded by people from Calakmul.

=== 606 ===
==== By place ====
====== Europe ======
- Queen Brunhilda pressures her grandson Theuderic II to go to war against his brother, Theudebert II of Austrasia. She puts Protadius, Mayor of the Palace, in charge of the Burgundian army. At the palace of Quierzy (Picardy), Theuderic assembles his army. The soldiers under Uncelen, Duke of Alemannia, refuse to fight against their countrymen, and declare that the king orders Protadius' death. He is killed by the Frankish warriors, and Theuderic is forced to sign a peace treaty.

====== Britain ======
- Cearl succeeds Pybba as king of Mercia (English Midlands).

====== Asia ======
- King Harsha of Thanesar establishes a northern Indian Empire, and unites the small monarchical states, from Punjab to the Indus Valley (modern Pakistan).
- Shashanka is the first recorded independent king of Bengal. He establishes his capital in modern-day Murshidabad (approximate date).

==== By topic ====
====== Religion ======
- February 22 – Sabinian dies at Rome after a two-year reign, and will not be replaced until 607.
- The diocese of Aquileia becomes a patriarchate (approximate date).

=== 607 ===
==== By place ====
====== Europe ======
- Visigoths, Austrasians, Neustrians and Lombards form an alliance against King Theuderic II of Burgundy, whose grandmother and sister have murdered Theuderic's wife Ermenberga, daughter of Witteric, king of the Visigoths. Fighting takes place around Narbonne, but little is known of the details or outcome (approximate date).
- Queen Brunhilda has Uncelen, Duke of Alemannia, removed from office after his foot is cut off as revenge for Protadius' death (according to the Lex Alamannorum).

====== Britain ======
- King Ceolwulf of Wessex fights the South Saxons.

====== Asia ======
- August 1 – Empress Suiko appoints Ono no Imoko as official envoy to the Sui Court (Japanese missions to Imperial China). She sends him to pay tribute to Emperor Yángdi, and let him deliver the famous letter from prince-regent Shōtoku which begins: "The Son of Heaven where the sun rises (Japan), to the Son of Heaven where the sun sets (China), may good health be with you." (Traditional Japanese date: July 3, 607).
- Yángdi is offended by his general Gao Jiong, who makes several comments critical of the emperor's policies, against Tujue submissive Yami Qaghan. He is executed (beheaded), and Gao's sons are exiled to the border provinces (Northern China).

==== By topic ====
====== Religion ======
- February 19 – The vacancy (sede vacante) that has existed on the papal throne, since the death last year of Sabinian, ends with the election of a Rome-born deacon of the Catholic Church. Pope Boniface III is appointed as the 66th pope, but dies the same year.
- Emperor Phocas bestows the title "Universal Bishop" upon Boniface III, in an effort to improve relations with Rome.
- October 11 – Thomas I is appointed as the 60th patriarch of Constantinople.
- The Hōryū-ji Buddhist temple in Ikaruga, near Nara (Japan), is constructed.

=== 608 ===
==== By place ====
====== Byzantine Empire ======
- Heraclian revolt: Heraclius the Elder, exarch of Africa, and his son (also named Heraclius) revolt against Emperor Phocas, whose regime in Constantinople has become unpopular and violent.
- Heraclius proclaims himself and his son as consuls, claiming the imperial title—and mint coins with the two wearing the consular robes. Syria and Palaestina Prima revolt.
- Byzantine–Persian War: King Khosrau II invades Armenia, and raids deep into Anatolia through the Byzantine provinces of Cappadocia, Phrygia, Galatia, and Bithynia.

====== Europe ======
- August 1 – The Column of Phocas at Rome is dedicated in honour of Phocas. The Corinthian column has a height of 13.6 m (44 ft).

====== Britain ======
- Eochaid Buide succeeds his father Áedán mac Gabráin as king of Dál Riata (modern Scotland).

====== Asia ======
- Sui dynasty Emperor Yang of Sui expresses the desire to control routes to the West, leading to two and a half centuries of Chinese military and trading activities in Central Asia.

==== By topic ====
====== Religion ======
- September 25 – Pope Boniface IV succeeds Boniface III, as the 67th pope of Rome.
- The observance of Halloween in the Roman Catholic Church is first recorded.
- The Georgian Orthodox Church returns to Chalcedonism (approximate date).

=== 609 ===
==== By place ====
====== Byzantine Empire ======
- Nicetas, cousin of future emperor Heraclius, launches an overland invasion in Egypt. He defeats a Byzantine army under Bonus (comes Orientis) outside Alexandria, sent from Constantinople.

====== Persia ======
- Battle of Dhi Qar: Arab tribesmen of Bakr ibn Wa'il defeat a Persian force (5,000 men), at a watering place near Kufa (Southern Iraq).

====== Asia ======
- Emperor Yángdi completes the Grand Canal; it provides an unbroken inland ship transport between the Yellow and Yangtze rivers. The canal network is 1,776 km (1,400 miles) long—linking five river systems—and extends from Beijing to the city of Hangzhou.
- The Sui dynasty government records a tax census of roughly 9 million registered households in the Chinese Empire, a population size of roughly 50 million people.
- Shibi Khan becomes the ninth ruler (khagan) of the Eastern Turkic Khaganate (approximate date).

==== By topic ====
====== Religion ======
- May 13 – The Pantheon in Rome is consecrated as "St. Mary and the Martyrs" (informally known as "Santa Maria Rotonda") by Pope Boniface IV (or 610).

== Births ==
600

- September 11 – Yuknoom the Great a Maya ruler of Calakmul
- Ali ibn Abi Talib, Muslim caliph and Shī‘ah imām (approximate date)
- Audomar, bishop of Thérouanne (approximate date)
- Bhāskara I, Indian mathematician (approximate date)
- Birinus, bishop of Dorchester (approximate date)
- Candrakīrti, Indian Madhyamaka philosopher
- Cunibert, bishop of Cologne (approximate date)
- Judoc, Breton noble and Catholic saint (d. 668)
- Li Shimin, son of Chinese General Li Yuan (the Duke of Tang)
- Remaclus, bishop of Maastricht (approximate date)
- Wandregisel, Frankish monk and abbot (approximate date)
- Yan Liben, Chinese painter (approximate date)

601

- September 13 – Ali, central figure in Shia Islam (d. 661)
- Hongren, Chán (Buddhist) patriarch of the Tang dynasty (d. 674)
- Ma Zhou, chancellor of the Tang dynasty (d. 648)
- Sigebert II, king of Austrasia and Burgundy (d. 613)
- Zhangsun, empress of the Tang dynasty (d. 636)

602

- Adaloald, king of the Lombards (d. 626)
- Li Chunfeng, Chinese mathematician and historian (d. 670)
- Liu Rengui, general and official of the Tang dynasty (d. 685)
- Muawiyah I, founder of the Umayyad Caliphate (d. 680)
- Theodore of Tarsus, archbishop of Canterbury (d. 690)
- Xuanzang, Chinese Buddhist monk and traveler (d. 664)
- Zhiyan, Chinese (Buddhist) patriarch (d. 668)
- Muawiyah bin Abi-Sufyan, Caliph of Syria (d. 680)

603

- Abu al-Aswad al-Du'ali, Muslim scholar (approximate date)
- Dagobert I, king of the Franks (d. 639)
- Li Daozong, prince of the Tang dynasty (approximate date)
- Li Yuanji, prince of the Tang dynasty (d. 626)
- Pacal the Great, ruler (ajaw) of Palenque (d. 683)
- Muyeol, king of Silla (Korea) (d. 661)
- Yŏn Kaesomun, dictator of Goguryeo (d. 666)

604

- Oswald, king (bretwalda) of Northumbria (approximate date)

605

- Chlodulf, bishop of Metz
- Colmán, bishop of Lindisfarne (approximate date)
- Fatimah, daughter of Muhammad (approximate date)
- Yang You, puppet emperor of the Sui dynasty (d. 619)
- Sisenand, king of the Visigoths (approximate date)
- Yang Tong, puppet emperor of the Sui dynasty (d. 619)

606

- Hafsa bint Umar, daughter of Umar and wife of Muhammad
- Han Yuan, chancellor of the Tang dynasty (d. 659)

607

- Ali ibn Abi Talib, ruler of the Rashidun Caliphate (d. 661)
- Hao Chujun, general of the Tang dynasty (d. 681)
- Shenxiu, Chinese Zen Buddhist patriarch (d. 706)
- Yang Gao, prince of the Sui dynasty (d. 618)

608

- Charibert II, king of Aquitaine (approximate date)
- Philibert of Jumièges, Frankish abbot (approximate date)

609

- Audoin, bishop of Rouen (d. 686)
- Hafsa bint Umar, wife of Muhammad (approximate date)

== Deaths ==
600

- March 13 - Leander, bishop of Seville possibly in 601)
- Aedh Buidhe, king of Uí Maine (Ireland)
- Beop, king of Baekje (Korea)
- Bhavavarman I, king of Cambodia
- Cainnech of Aghaboe, Irish abbot and saint (b. c.515)
- Uatu mac Áedo, king of Connacht (Ireland)
- Venantius Fortunatus, bishop of Poitiers, one of the last representatives of Classical Latin poetry
- Yang Jun, prince of the Sui dynasty (b. 571)

601

- March 13 or 600 – Leander, bishop of Seville
- Agilulf, bishop of Metz
- Reccared I, king of the Visigoths (b. 559)
- Bertha of Kent, Frankish-born Anglo-Saxon queen consort, canonized (b. c.565) (approximate date)
- Sophia, Byzantine Empress consort (approximate date)

602

- September 10 – Dugu Qieluo, empress of the Chinese Sui dynasty (b. 544)
- November 27 – Maurice, Byzantine emperor (b. 539)
- Nu'man III, king of the Lakhmids
- Ariulf, Lombard duke of Spoleto
- Bayan I, ruler (khagan) of the Avars
- Comentiolus, Byzantine general (magister militum)
- Peter, Byzantine general (curopalates)
- Theodosius, Byzantine co-emperor
- Tiberius, Byzantine prince
- Lady Xian, Chinese general (b. 512)

603

- Fintan of Clonenagh, Irish abbot
- Liuva II, king of the Visigoths (b. 583)
- Mungo, Brythonic bishop (or 614)
- Tardu, ruler (khagan) of the Göktürks

604

- March 12 – Gregory I, pope of the Catholic Church
- May 26 – Augustine, Archbishop of Canterbury (approximate date)
- August 13 – Emperor Wen of Sui, emperor of the Sui dynasty (b. 541)
- November 4 – Yohl Ik'nal, female ruler of Palenque (Mexico)
- December 16 – Houzhu, emperor of the Chen dynasty (b. 553)
- Æthelric, king of Deira (approximate date)
- Berthoald, Mayor of the Palace (Burgundy)
- Colmán Rímid, High King of Ireland
- Sledd, king of Essex (approximate date)
- Xiao Mohe, general of the Sui dynasty (b. 532)
- Yang Yong, prince of the Sui dynasty

605

- Alexander of Tralles, physician (approximate date)
- Brandub mac Echach, king of Uí Ceinnselaig (Ireland)
- Constantina, Byzantine empress (approximate date)
- Damian, Coptic Orthodox Patriarch of Alexandria

606

- February 22 – Pope Sabinian
- Colmán of Cloyne, Irish monk and poet
- Cyriacus II, patriarch of Constantinople
- Jianzhi Sengcan, patriarch of Chán
- John Climacus, monk and writer
- Paterius, bishop of Brescia (Italy)
- Protadius, Mayor of the Palace (Burgundy)
- Pybba, king of Mercia (approximate date)
- Yang Su, general of the Sui dynasty
- Yang Zhao, prince of the Sui dynasty (b. 584)

607

- November 12 – Pope Boniface III
- Desiderius, archbishop of Vienne (approximate date)
- Gao Jiong, general of the Sui dynasty
- Trudpert, Irish missionary (or 644)

608

- Áedán mac Gabráin, king of Dál Riata

609

- Qamishoʿ, Syriac Orthodox Grand Metropolitan of the East.
- Venantius Fortunatus, Latin poet and bishop (or 600)
- Yang Lihua, empress of Northern Zhou (b. 561)
- Zuhayr bin Abi Sulma, Arabian poet (approx.)

== Bibliography ==
- Kaegi, Walter E. (2003). Heraclius, Emperor of Byzantium. Cambridge University Press. ISBN 9780521814591.
- MacDonald, William L. (1976). The Pantheon : design, meaning, and progeny. Cambridge, Mass.: Harvard University Press. ISBN 0-674-01019-1.
