= 606 =

Calendar year

606 in various calendars
| Gregorian calendar | 606; DCVI |
| Ab urbe condita | 1359 |
| Armenian calendar | 55; ԹՎ ԾԵ |
| Assyrian calendar | 5356 |
| Balinese saka calendar | 527–528 |
| Bengali calendar | 12–13 |
| Berber calendar | 1556 |
| Buddhist calendar | 1150 |
| Burmese calendar | −32 |
| Byzantine calendar | 6114–6115 |
| Chinese calendar | 乙丑年 (Wood Ox); 3303 or 3096 — to — 丙寅年 (Fire Tiger); 3304 or 3097 |
| Coptic calendar | 322–323 |
| Discordian calendar | 1772 |
| Ethiopian calendar | 598–599 |
| Hebrew calendar | 4366–4367 |
- Hindu calendars
| Vikram Samvat | 662–663 |
| Shaka Samvat | 527–528 |
| Kali Yuga | 3706–3707 |
| Holocene calendar | 10606 |
| Iranian calendar | 16 BP – 15 BP |
| Islamic calendar | 17 BH – 16 BH |
| Japanese calendar | N/A |
| Javanese calendar | 495–496 |
| Julian calendar | 606; DCVI |
| Korean calendar | 2939 |
| Minguo calendar | 1306 before ROC 民前1306年 |
| Nanakshahi calendar | −862 |
| Seleucid era | 917/918 AG |
| Thai solar calendar | 1148–1149 |
| Tibetan calendar | ཤིང་མོ་གླང་ལོ་ (female Wood-Ox); 732 or 351 or −421 — to — མེ་ཕོ་སྟག་ལོ་ (male Fire-Tiger); 733 or 352 or −420 |

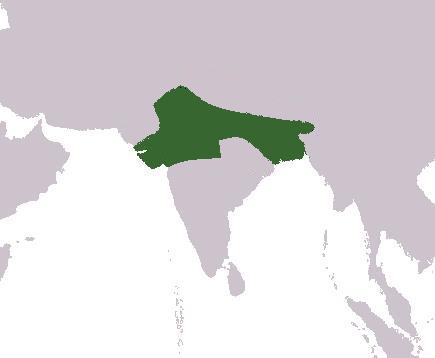
The Empire of Harsha in India (7th century)

Year 606 (DCVI) was a common year starting on Saturday of the Julian calendar. The denomination 606 for this year has been used since the early medieval period, when the Anno Domini calendar era became the prevalent method in Europe for naming years.

== Events ==
=== By place ===
==== Europe ====
- Queen Brunhilda pressures her grandson Theuderic II to go to war against his brother, Theudebert II of Austrasia. She puts Protadius, Mayor of the Palace, in charge of the Burgundian army. At the palace of Quierzy (Picardy), Theuderic assembles his army. The soldiers under Uncelen, Duke of Alemannia, refuse to fight against their countrymen, and declare that the king orders Protadius' death. He is killed by the Frankish warriors, and Theuderic is forced to sign a peace treaty.

==== Britain ====
- Cearl succeeds Pybba as king of Mercia (English Midlands).

==== Asia ====
- King Harsha of Thanesar establishes a northern Indian Empire, and unites the small monarchical states, from Punjab to the Indus Valley (modern Pakistan).
- Shashanka is the first recorded independent king of Bengal. He establishes his capital in modern-day Murshidabad (approximate date).

=== By topic ===
==== Religion ====
- February 22 – Sabinian dies at Rome after a two-year reign, and will not be replaced until 607.
- The diocese of Aquileia becomes a patriarchate (approximate date).

== Births ==
- Hafsa bint Umar, daughter of Umar and wife of Muhammad
- Han Yuan, chancellor of the Tang dynasty (d. 659)

== Deaths ==
- February 22 – Pope Sabinian
- Colmán of Cloyne, Irish monk and poet
- Cyriacus II, patriarch of Constantinople
- Jianzhi Sengcan, patriarch of Chán
- John Climacus, monk and writer
- Paterius, bishop of Brescia (Italy)
- Protadius, Mayor of the Palace (Burgundy)
- Pybba, king of Mercia (approximate date)
- Yang Su, general of the Sui dynasty
- Yang Zhao, prince of the Sui dynasty (b. 584)
