= 587 =

Calendar year

587 in various calendars
- Gregorian calendar: 587; DLXXXVII
- Ab urbe condita: 1340
- Armenian calendar: 36; ԹՎ ԼԶ
- Assyrian calendar: 5337
- Balinese saka calendar: 508–509
- Bengali calendar: −7 – −6
- Berber calendar: 1537
- Buddhist calendar: 1131
- Burmese calendar: −51
- Byzantine calendar: 6095–6096
- Chinese calendar: 丙午年 (Fire Horse); 3284 or 3077 — to — 丁未年 (Fire Goat); 3285 or 3078
- Coptic calendar: 303–304
- Discordian calendar: 1753
- Ethiopian calendar: 579–580
- Hebrew calendar: 4347–4348
- Hindu calendars
- Vikram Samvat: 643–644
- Shaka Samvat: 508–509
- Kali Yuga: 3687–3688
- Holocene calendar: 10587
- Iranian calendar: 35 BP – 34 BP
- Islamic calendar: 36 BH – 35 BH
- Javanese calendar: 476–477
- Julian calendar: 587; DLXXXVII
- Korean calendar: 2920
- Minguo calendar: 1325 before ROC 民前1325年
- Nanakshahi calendar: −881
- Seleucid era: 898/899 AG
- Thai solar calendar: 1129–1130
- Tibetan calendar: མེ་ཕོ་རྟ་ལོ་ (male Fire-Horse); 713 or 332 or −440 — to — མེ་མོ་ལུག་ལོ་ (female Fire-Sheep); 714 or 333 or −439

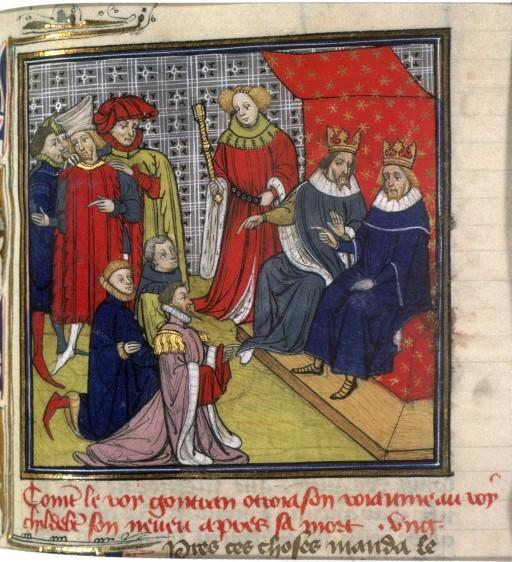
Guntram and Childebert II (Treaty of Andelot)

Year 587 (DLXXXVII) was a common year starting on Wednesday of the Julian calendar. The denomination 587 for this year has been used since the early medieval period, when the Anno Domini calendar era became the prevalent method in Europe for naming years.

== Events ==
=== By place ===
==== Eastern Roman Empire ====
- Emperor Maurice builds more fortifications along the Danube frontier, separating the Byzantine Empire from the realm of the Avars and Slavs (approximate date).
- Comentiolus, Byzantine general (magister militum), assembles an army of 10,000 men at Anchialus (modern Bulgaria). He prepares an ambush for the Avars in the Haemus Mountains.

==== Europe ====
- King Guntram sends envoys to Brittany, to stop the raiding on Frankish territory. He compels obedience from Waroch II and demands 1,000 solidus for looting Nantes.
- King Reccared I renounces Arianism and adopts Catholicism. Many Visigothic nobles follow his example, but in Septimania (Southern Gaul) there are Arian uprisings.
- November 28 – Treaty of Andelot: Guntram recognizes King Childebert II of Austrasia as heir. He signs a treaty with Queen Brunhilda at Andelot-Blancheville.
- Winter – Childebert II appoints Uncelen as the Duke of Alemannia (approximate date).

==== Britain ====
- Sledd succeeds his father Æscwine as king of Essex (approximate date).

==== Asia ====
- Battle of Shigisan: The Soga clan, which has intermarried with the royal Yamato clan, fights the Mononobe and Nakatomi clans over influence in selecting a new successor for the Japanese throne, after Emperor Yōmei dies. The Soga favor importing Buddhism from the Asian mainland, described there as the religion of the most civilized. The Mononobe and Nakatomi hold that Buddhism would be an affront to the gods. The Soga win the civil war and Sushun, age 66, becomes the 32nd emperor of Japan.
- Fall – The Liang dynasty ends: Emperor Wéndi of the Sui dynasty abolishes Western Liang and expands his territory into the lower valley of the Yangtze River. He sends his official Gao Jiong to the capital Jiangling, to pacify the citizens. The former emperor Xiao Jing Di becomes a vassal and is named the Duke of Liang.
- Bagha Qaghan becomes the seventh ruler (khagan) of the Turkic Kaganate.

=== By topic ===
==== Religion ====
- The filioque clause is first used in the Nicene Creed, against the Arians in Visigothic Spain (approximate date).

== Births ==
- Soga no Emishi, statesman of Japan (d. 645)
- Theuderic II, king of Austrasia (d. 613)
- Zhang Xingcheng, chancellor of the Tang dynasty (d. 653)

== Deaths ==
- April – Yōmei, emperor of Japan (b. 540)
- August 13 – Radegund, Frankish princess
- Æscwine, king of Essex (approximate date)
- Ishbara Qaghan, ruler (khagan) of the Göktürks
- Mononobe no Moriya, clan leader (Ō-muraji)
- Varāhamihira, Indian astronomer (b. 505)

== Sources ==
- Martindale, John R., ed. (1992). The Prosopography of the Later Roman Empire: Volume III, AD 527–641. Cambridge: Cambridge University Press. ISBN 0-521-20160-8.
