= Gundemar =

Visigothic king

- King of Hispania, Septimania and Gallaecia
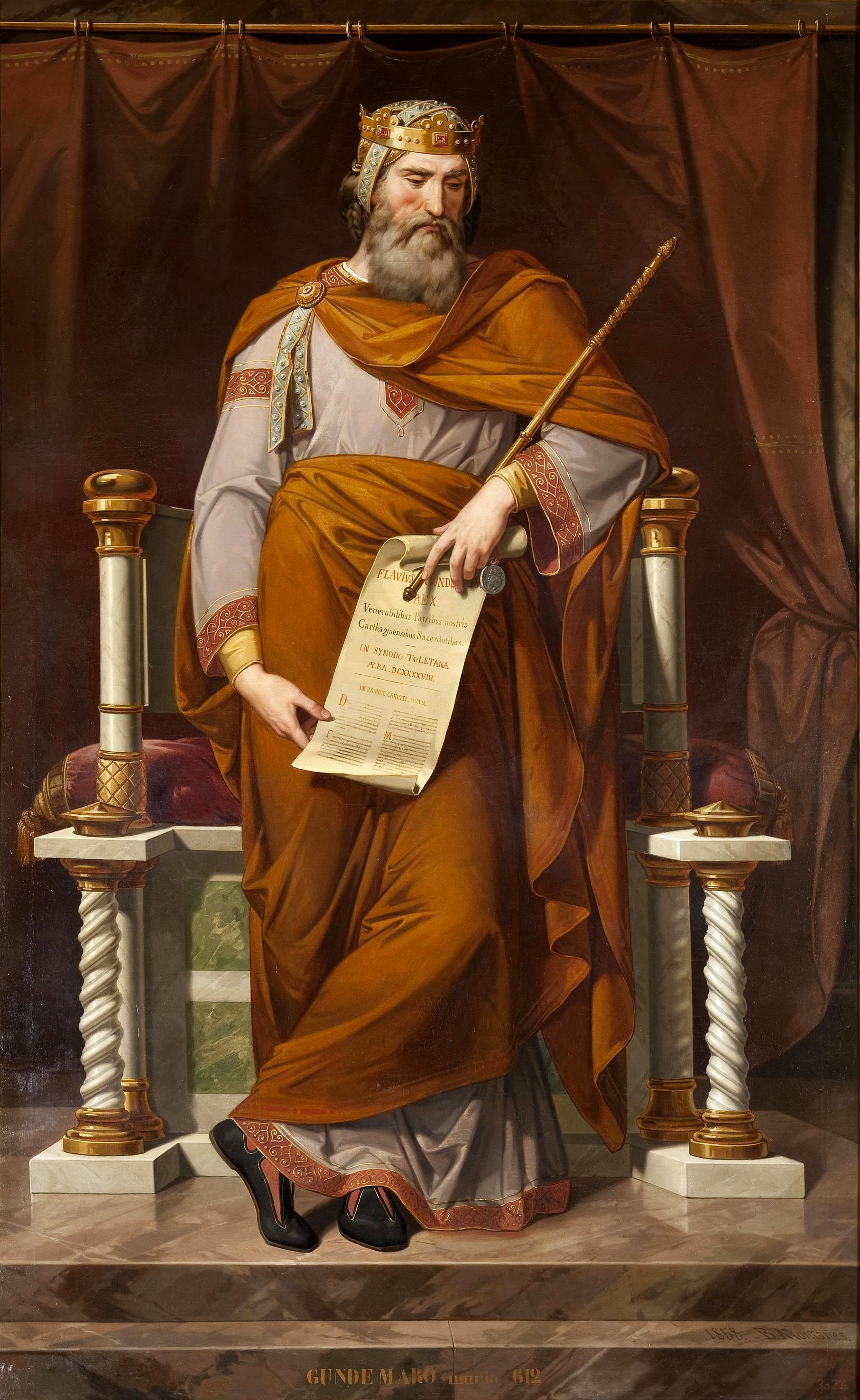
- Imaginary portrait of Gundemar, by Bernardino Montañés. Oil on canvas (1858)

King of the Visigoths
- Reign: c. April 610 – c. February/March 612
- Predecessor: Witteric
- Successor: Sisebut
- Died: c. February/March 612
- Spouse: Hildoara
- Religion: Chalcedonian Christianity

Gundemar (Gothic: 𐌲𐌿𐌽𐌸𐌹𐌼𐌴𐍂𐍃 ) was a Visigothic King of Hispania, Septimania and Galicia (610–612).

== Reign ==
Gundemar continued a policy of amity with Clotaire II of Neustria and Theodobert II of Austrasia. To this end, he sent grand sums of money to support their cause against their relative (cousin and brother, respectively) Theuderic II of Burgundy. At other times, he pursued a hostile policy against Brunhilda.

According to Isidore of Seville, Gundemar made one expedition against the Basques, then besieged the Byzantines in the following year. With the Byzantine Empire in particular, he had a Casus Belli because of jurisdictional challenge between Carthage and the Spanish church. He died a natural death in Toledo, probably in February or March 612. The Chronica Regum Visigotthorum records that Gundemar reigned for one year, ten months and 14 days. He was succeeded by Sisebut.

He was married to Hildoara.

== Legacy ==
The towns of Gondomar in Portugal and in Galicia are named after him.

Regnal titles
Preceded by Witteric	King of the Visigoths; April 610 – February/March 612	Succeeded by Sisebut
