= Dentelin =

Region of the Frankish Empire

The Frankish dominions c.629

Dentelin was a region of the Frankish Empire disputed between Austrasia and Neustria.

At the end of the 6th century, the duchy of Dentelinus was created in the north of what would later constitute Neustria. The duchy presumably included the bishoprics of Boulogne, Thérouanne, Arras, Tournai, Cambrai and Noyon: thus, the northwestern region between the North Sea and the Silva Carbonaria, an area the outlines of which were very similar to the later Flanders. The duchy was primarily intended to serve as a military and strategic deterrent against Frisian and Saxon invasions, and was a cornerstone in the military defense of the Merovingian Empire. In 600, Chlothar II (584–628) was forced to temporarily cede the duchy to Austrasia, but after the restoration of the Austrasian dual-monarchy in 622–623, the duchy was returned.

Mentioned in the Chronicle of Fredegar, the Duchy of Dentelin included far north-eastern parts of modern France and south-western parts of Belgium. The cities of Boulogne-sur-Mer, Thérouanne, Tournai, Arras, and Cambrai lay within the duchy.

Dentelin formed part of the inheritance of the Merovingian king of Neustria Chlothar II, but was lost by him to his cousins, Theudebert II and Theuderic II, following the battle of Dormelles in 599.

Chlothar, who outlasted his rival kinsmen and became sole Frankish king, retained Dentelin when he installed his son Dagobert I as king of Austrasia in 623. When Dagobert died in 639, Dentelin was included in Neustria, and remained part of that kingdom afterwards.
