= 607 (disambiguation) =

607 may refer to:

- 607, the year
- Peugeot 607, an executive car
- Area code 607
