= Ludegast =

Bishop of Mainz

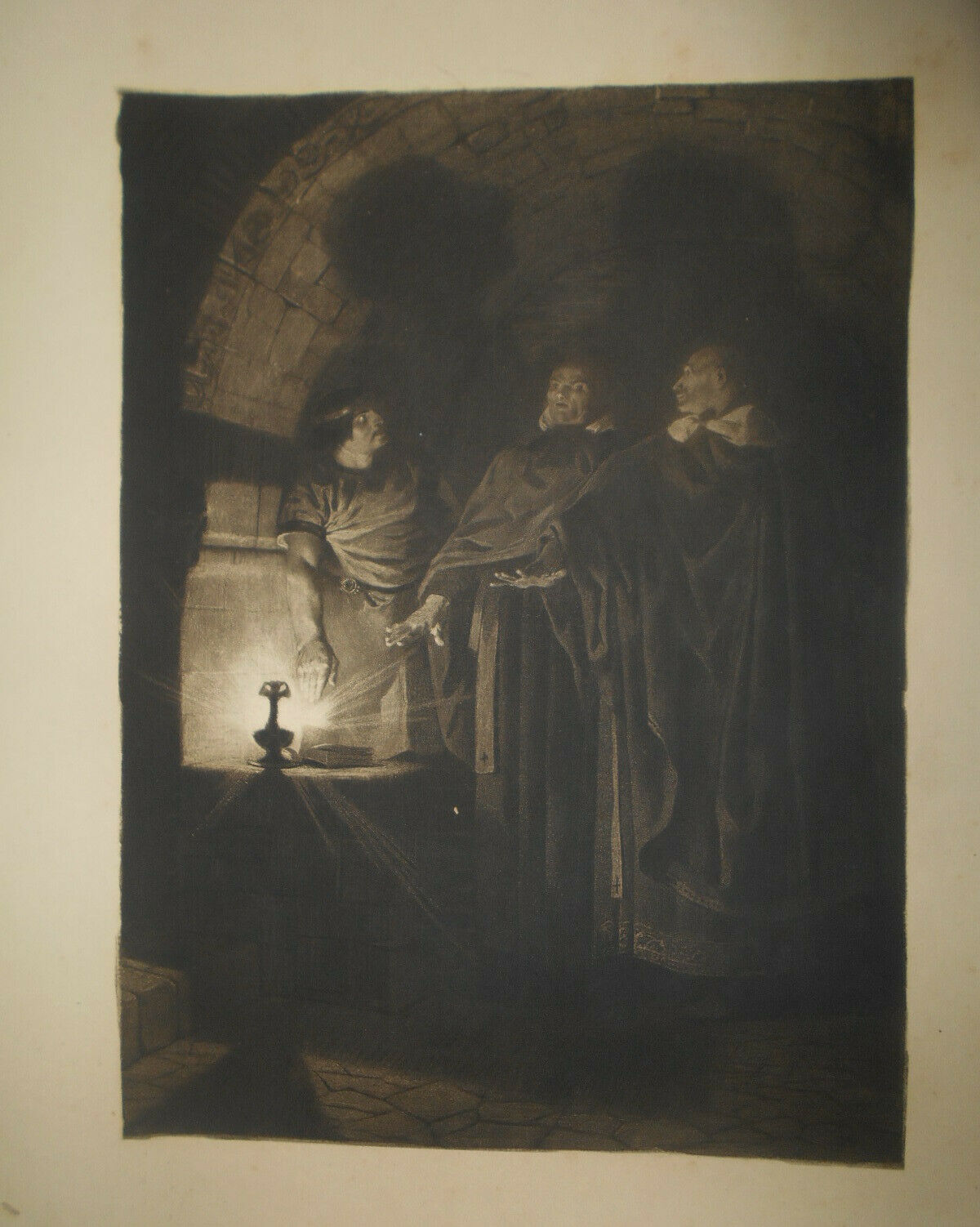
The Leudaste Conspiracy by Jean-Paul Laurens

Ludegast (Leudegasius, Leodegar, Leudegarius, Lesio, Leonisius) was bishop of Mainz in the early 7th century, succeeding Siegbert I. The Latinized name Leudegasius may be of East Germanic origin. He seems to have been a Burgundian. The period of his episcopate can only be roughly classified into the time around 610.

In the quarrels between Theuderic II and Theudebert II in 611/612 he took part on the party of Theuderic. As the reason for this decision the Chronicle of Fredegar ascribes that he held Theudebert incompetent and desiderated Theuderics capability.

The author of the Chronicle of Fredegar let him cite a fable to Theuderic, in order to prevent him from annihilation.

For the period after the Merovingian brother war and the death of Theuderic in 613 documents may not be retrieved. Ludegast did not participate for unclear reasons at the Synod of Paris in 614. It may be assumed that he lost his bishopric due to the fall of Brunhilda.

Preceded by Siegbert I	Bishop of Mainz unknown	Succeeded by Petilinus
