= Paisco Loveno =

Paisco Loveno Paísc Loé
- Comune
- Comune di Paisco Loveno
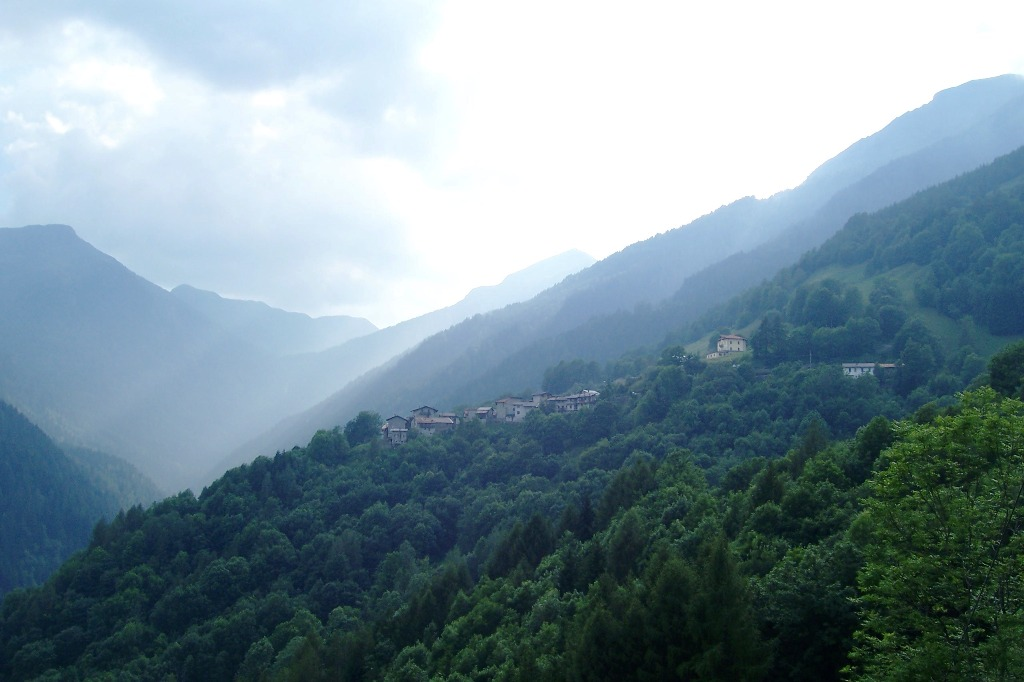
- Paisco Loveno

- Location within Italy Location within Lombardy
- Coordinates: 46°4′48″N 10°17′36″E
- Country: Italy
- Region: Lombardy
- Province: Brescia (BS)
- Frazioni: Ardinghelli, Case di Bornia, Case del Longo, Grumello, Loveno, Perdonico

Government
  - Mayor: Bernardo Mascherpa

Area
  - Total: 35.87 km^{2} (13.85 sq mi)
- Elevation: 853 m (2,799 ft)

Population (30 November 2021)
  - Total: 176
  - Density: 4.91/km^{2} (12.7/sq mi)
- Demonym: Paischesi
- Time zone: UTC+1 (CET)
  - Summer (DST): UTC+2 (CEST)
- Postal code: 25050
- Dialing code: 0364
- Patron saint: Anthony of Padua (Loveno-Grumello); Saint Paterius (Paisco)
- Saint day: 13 June; 21 February
- Website: Official website

Paisco Loveno (Camunian: Paísc Lóe) is a comune in the province of Brescia, in Lombardy, northern Italy.
