= 607 =

Calendar year

607 in various calendars
Gregorian calendar	607; DCVII
Ab urbe condita	1360
Armenian calendar	56; ԹՎ ԾԶ
Assyrian calendar	5357
Balinese saka calendar	528–529
Bengali calendar	13–14
Berber calendar	1557
Buddhist calendar	1151
Burmese calendar	−31
Byzantine calendar	6115–6116
Chinese calendar	丙寅年 (Fire Tiger); 3304 or 3097 — to — 丁卯年 (Fire Rabbit); 3305 or 3098
Coptic calendar	323–324
Discordian calendar	1773
Ethiopian calendar	599–600
Hebrew calendar	4367–4368
- Hindu calendars
Vikram Samvat	663–664
Shaka Samvat	528–529
Kali Yuga	3707–3708
Holocene calendar	10607
Iranian calendar	15 BP – 14 BP
Islamic calendar	16 BH – 14 BH
Japanese calendar	N/A
Javanese calendar	496–497
Julian calendar	607; DCVII
Korean calendar	2940
Minguo calendar	1305 before ROC 民前1305年
Nanakshahi calendar	−861
Seleucid era	918/919 AG
Thai solar calendar	1149–1150
Tibetan calendar	མེ་ཕོ་སྟག་ལོ་ (male Fire-Tiger); 733 or 352 or −420 — to — མེ་མོ་ཡོས་ལོ་ (female Fire-Hare); 734 or 353 or −419

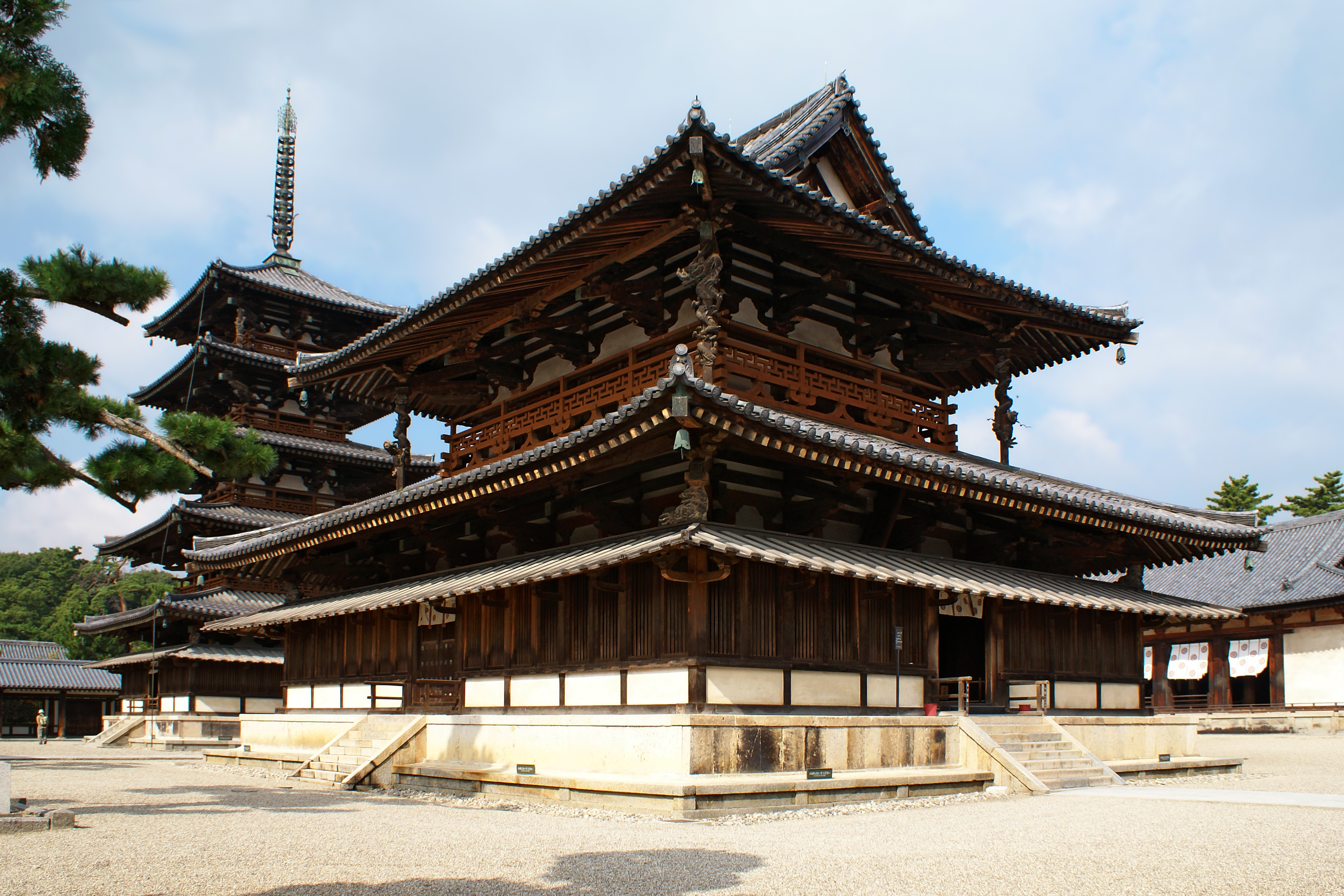
The Hōryū-ji Buddhist temple (Japan)

Year 607 (DCVII) was a common year starting on Sunday of the Julian calendar. The denomination 607 for this year has been used since the early medieval period, when the Anno Domini calendar era became the prevalent method in Europe for naming years.

== Events ==
=== By place ===
==== Europe ====
- Visigoths, Austrasians, Neustrians and Lombards form an alliance against King Theuderic II of Burgundy, whose grandmother and sister have murdered Theuderic's wife Ermenberga, daughter of Witteric, king of the Visigoths. Fighting takes place around Narbonne, but little is known of the details or outcome (approximate date).
- Queen Brunhilda has Uncelen, Duke of Alemannia, removed from office after his foot is cut off as revenge for Protadius' death (according to the Lex Alamannorum).

==== Britain ====
- King Ceolwulf of Wessex fights the South Saxons.

==== Asia ====
- August 1 – Empress Suiko appoints Ono no Imoko as official envoy to the Sui Court (Japanese missions to Imperial China). She sends him to pay tribute to Emperor Yángdi, and let him deliver the famous letter from prince-regent Shōtoku which begins: "The Son of Heaven where the sun rises (Japan), to the Son of Heaven where the sun sets (China), may good health be with you." (Traditional Japanese date: July 3, 607).
- Yángdi is offended by his general Gao Jiong, who makes several comments critical of the emperor's policies, against Tujue submissive Yami Qaghan. He is executed (beheaded), and Gao's sons are exiled to the border provinces (Northern China).

=== By topic ===
==== Religion ====
- February 19 – The vacancy (sede vacante) that has existed on the papal throne, since the death last year of Sabinian, ends with the election of a Rome-born deacon of the Catholic Church. Pope Boniface III is appointed as the 66th pope, but dies the same year.
- Emperor Phocas bestows the title "Universal Bishop" upon Boniface III, in an effort to improve relations with Rome.
- October 11 – Thomas I is appointed as the 60th patriarch of Constantinople.
- The Hōryū-ji Buddhist temple in Ikaruga, near Nara (Japan), is constructed.

== Births ==
- Ali ibn Abi Talib, ruler of the Rashidun Caliphate (d. 661)
- Hao Chujun, general of the Tang dynasty (d. 681)
- Shenxiu, Chinese Zen Buddhist patriarch (d. 706)
- Yang Gao, prince of the Sui dynasty (d. 618)

== Deaths ==
- November 12 – Pope Boniface III
- Desiderius, archbishop of Vienne (approximate date)
- Gao Jiong, general of the Sui dynasty
- Trudpert, Irish missionary (or 644)
