= Faileuba =

Frankish queen (died 596)

Queen consort of Austrasia Queen consort of Burgundy
- Died: 596
- Spouse: Childebert II
- Issue: Theudebert II; Theuderic II; Theudelia

Faileuba or Faileube (died 596) was a Frankish queen, who was queen consort of Austrasia and Burgundy through her marriage to Childebert II. She was known for foiling a plot to depose her and her mother-in-law Brunhilda by Faileuba's children's nurse and household manager.

== Early life ==
Not much was written about Faileuba's life. However, it is known that she came from a family with few political connections and wealth, and was possibly of low birth. She became the mistress of Childebert II, king of Austrasia, a kingdom within the Frankish Empire. Although their relationship eventually ended, Childebert's mother, Brunhilda, later sought a bride for her son after ending his engagement to the Bavarian princess Theolinda and chose his former mistress instead of pursuing another foreign alliance. It is speculated that she was selected for her loyalty and because she lacked political connections that could undermine Brunhilda's influence.

== Queen of Austrasia and Burgundy ==
Childebert and Faileuba had three children together, the future Theudebert II in 586 and Theuderic II the following year in 587, as well as a daughter, Theudelia. Theuderic was baptised by Veranus of Cavaillon, who was at the time known for performing miracles.

In 587, Faileuba accompanied her husband, Brunhilda and her sister-in-law Chlodosinda to Trier to meet with Guntram, king of Burgundy and Childebert's uncle. There, the two agreed the Treaty of Andelot, which named each other as heirs to the other's kingdom. The treaty also set out provisions for Faileuba and other women in the family, with Guntrum promising to care for her like she was his own sister.

In 589, she gave birth to a child who died shortly after birth, leaving Faileuba critically ill and bedridden for weeks. According to Gregory of Tours, while Faileuba was recovering in bed and in and out of consciousness, she overheard her children's nurse Septimima conspire with their household manager, Droctulf, and two palace officials, Sunnegesil and Gallomagnus, to depose her and Brunhilda. The conspirators regarded Faileuba as a threat due to her influence on the king and her children. The plan was for Septimima to convince Childebert to desert Faileuba, marry another woman and exile his mother from court. If the king refused to repudiate his wife, Septimima would murder him with witchcraft so the conspirators could assume the regency of the young princes. Faileuba was said to have crawled out of bed to inform Brunhilda of the plot. Septimima and Droctulf were arrested and tortured on the rack, where they both confessed to the conspiracy. The former claimed she was Droctulf's lover, and had killed her husband with witchcraft. As punishment, they both were severely beaten in addition to Droctulf's hair and ears being removed, while Septimima was sent to work on an estate in Marlenheim after her face was burned with red hot irons.

Around 595, Faileuba is no longer mentioned in the historical record. A Lombardian source from a century later states that she was poisoned alongside her husband in 596. After their deaths, Theudebert ascends to the throne of Austrasia, while Theuderic receives the kingdom of Burgundy and some Austrasian territories.

== Sources ==
- Harrison, Dick (1998). The Age of Abbesses and Queens: Gender and Political Culture in Early Medieval Europe. Lund, Sweden: Nordic Academic Press. ISBN 9789189116047.
- Puhak, Shelley (3 March 2022). The Dark Queens: A Gripping Tale of Power, Ambition and Murderous Rivalry in Early Medieval France. Bloomsbury Publishing. ISBN 9781801109130.
- Nelson, Janet L. (1986). Politics and ritual in early medieval Europe. London: Hambledon Press. ISBN 9780907628590.
- Wemple, Suzanne Fonay (1981). Women in Frankish Society: Marriage and the Cloister, 500 to 900. Philadelphia: University of Pennsylvania Press. ISBN 9780812277982.
- Gregory of Tours (1974). Gregory of Tours The History of the Franks. Translated by Thorpe, Lewis. Penguin Publishing Group. ISBN 9780140442953.
