= Gundoland =

Gundoland or Gundeland was the mayor of the palace of Neustria from 613 to his death. According to the Liber Historiae Francorum, he was nobilis, egregius, and industrius: noble, outstanding, and diligent.

Gundoland succeeded Landric, possibly his brother, for both were recorded as uncles of Saint Aldegunda. Gundoland was succeeded by Aega on appointment of Dagobert I sometime before this latter's death in 639. Gundoland died sometime before that. He ruled for 26 years.

== Sources ==
- Bachrach, Bernard S., ed. and trans. (1973), Liber historiae Francorum, Lawrence, Kan.: Coronado Press, OCLC 982458
