= Hildoara =

Hildoara (6th-century – fl. 610) was a Visigoth queen consort by marriage to king Gundemar (610–612).

She is described as a pious follower of the Nicene Christianity, a role model in her protection of the Nicene Priesthood and her mercy toward the poor, and as a beloved spouse by Gundemar, who took her advice not only in family issues but also in state affairs.

After her death, the letter-writer Count Bulgar sent condolences to Gundemar.
