= Michel Pignolet de Montéclair =

French composer (1667–1737)

- Born: Michel Pignolet; December 4, 1667; Andelot, Champagne (province), France
- Died: September 22, 1737 (aged 69); Domont, Val-d'Oise, France
- Occupation: Composer

Michel Pignolet de Montéclair (4 December 1667 – 22 September 1737) was a French composer of the baroque period.

He was born Michel Pignolet in Andelot, Champagne (province), France, and only later added "Montéclair" (the name of a fortress in his home town) to his name. Little is known of his life, and no official portraits exist. He was the son of a weaver; his entrance into the choir school at the age of nine may have been the only chance of escaping the poverty of a weaver's life. In 1687, he went to Paris and joined the orchestra of the Opera, where he played the basse de violon. In Paris he studied with Jean-Baptiste Moreau.

At some point between 1687 and the early years of the new century, he seems to have been maître de musique to the Prince de Vaudémont and to have followed him to Italy. It was probably from there that he brought the idea to add the double bass to the opera orchestra.

All the time Montéclair must have worked as a music teacher of high regard: among his pupils were the daughters of his colleague François Couperin. Montéclair's approach to teaching was fresh and almost modern. He published books on teaching music (e.g., in 1709), and around 1730 he published Recueil de brunettes, which contains vocal music adapted for flute. The collection was expressly intended as a pedagogical tool to teach French style, and for this reason the music is underlaid with the text. He opened a music shop in 1721, retired from teaching in 1735, and gave up his position in the opera orchestra shortly before his death. He died in Domont in 1737.

Montéclair was not greatly productive as a composer, but was an innovator in orchestration who had a significant influence on the development of the art form. His work was later taken up by Jean-Philippe Rameau. His specialty was using certain instruments to enhance the stage scene, e.g., letting horns play softly behind the stage to simulate a faraway hunt. Among his stage works are Festes de l'été and Jephté, which was considered difficult by contemporaries.

== Works ==
His works include:

- Cantata: La morte di Lucretia (in Italian)
- Cantata: Il dispetto in amore (in Italian)
- Cantata: La mort de Didon (written circa 1709 in French)
- Cantata: Le triomphe de l'amour (in French)
- Cantata: Pyrame et Thisbé (in French)
- Le Dépit généreux
- Le Retour de la Paix
- La Badine
- Pan et Syrinx
- Europe
- Ariane et Bacchus
- Jephte
- Musette: Les festes de l'été (1716)
- "Recueil de brunettes" (Paris: Boivin, ca. 1730)
