= 613 =

Calendar year

613 in various calendars
- Gregorian calendar: 613; DCXIII
- Ab urbe condita: 1366
- Armenian calendar: 62; ԹՎ ԿԲ
- Assyrian calendar: 5363
- Balinese saka calendar: 534–535
- Bengali calendar: 19–20
- Berber calendar: 1563
- Buddhist calendar: 1157
- Burmese calendar: −25
- Byzantine calendar: 6121–6122
- Chinese calendar: 壬申年 (Water Monkey); 3310 or 3103 — to — 癸酉年 (Water Rooster); 3311 or 3104
- Coptic calendar: 329–330
- Discordian calendar: 1779
- Ethiopian calendar: 605–606
- Hebrew calendar: 4373–4374
- Hindu calendars
- Vikram Samvat: 669–670
- Shaka Samvat: 534–535
- Kali Yuga: 3713–3714
- Holocene calendar: 10613
- Iranian calendar: 9 BP – 8 BP
- Islamic calendar: 9 BH – 8 BH
- Japanese calendar: N/A
- Javanese calendar: 503–504
- Julian calendar: 613; DCXIII
- Korean calendar: 2946
- Minguo calendar: 1299 before ROC 民前1299年
- Nanakshahi calendar: −855
- Seleucid era: 924/925 AG
- Thai solar calendar: 1155–1156
- Tibetan calendar: ཆུ་ཕོ་སྤྲེ་ལོ་ (male Water-Monkey); 739 or 358 or −414 — to — ཆུ་མོ་བྱ་ལོ་ (female Water-Bird); 740 or 359 or −413

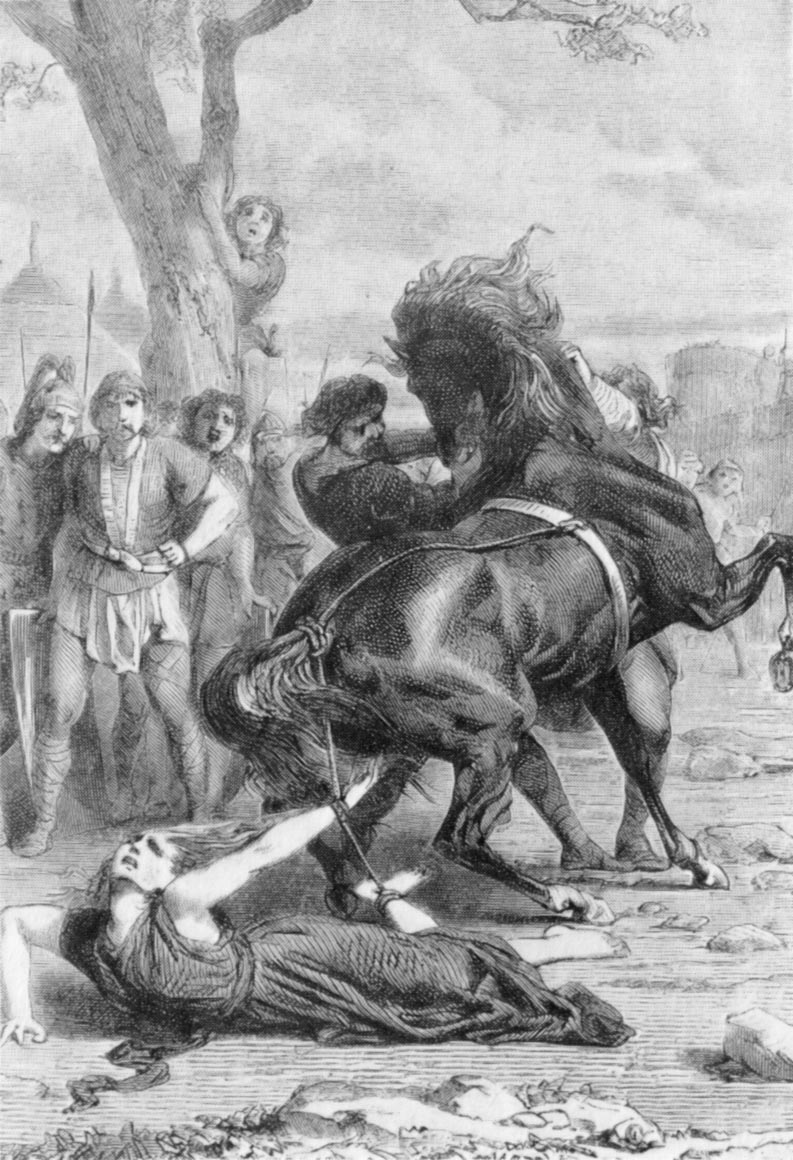
Queen Brunhilda of Austrasia is executed

Year 613 (DCXIII) was a common year starting on Monday of the Julian calendar. The denomination 613 for this year has been used since the early medieval period, when the Anno Domini calendar era became the prevalent method in Europe for naming years.

== Events ==
=== By place ===
==== Byzantine Empire ====
- Emperor Heraclius marries his niece Martina; she becomes empress (Augusta) of the Byzantine Empire. This second marriage is considered to fall within the prohibited degree of kinship, and is approved by the Catholic Church in Constantinople.
- January 22 – Constantine is crowned co-emperor (Caesar) by his father Heraclius and shortly after betrothed to his cousin, Gregoria, daughter of Nicetas. Only 8 months old, Constantine has no real power and his dynastic title is purely ceremonial.
- Byzantine–Persian War: Heraclius appoints himself commander-in-chief, along with his brother Theodore (curopalates), to solidify command of the army.
- Battle of Antioch: Heraclius mobilises a Byzantine expeditionary force to Antioch (Syria), but is completely defeated outside the city by the Persians. Shahin Vahmanzadegan makes further inroads into Central and Western Anatolia. In Syria, Shahrbaraz captures the cities of Damascus, Apamea and Emesa.

==== Europe ====
- King Theuderic II dies of dysentery in the Austrasian capital of Metz, while preparing a campaign against his longtime enemy, Chlothar II. His grandmother Brunhilda attempts to establish a third regency for her illegitimate great-grandson Sigebert II.
- Chlothar II reunites the Frankish Kingdom by ordering the murder of Sigebert II. He accuses Brunhilda, age 70, of killing ten kings of the Franks (according to the Liber Historiae Francorum). She is dragged to death behind a wild horse at Abbeville.

==== Britain ====
- Battle of Chester: King Æthelfrith of Northumbria invades Gwynedd (northwest Wales), in order to route out his old enemy, Edwin of Deira. A united Brythonic force (Gwynedd, Powys, Pengwern and Dumnonian warriors) is defeated near Chester.

==== Asia ====
- Goguryeo–Sui War: Emperor Yángdi crosses the Liao River again, and puts Manchuria under siege. During the campaign Yang Xuangan, an official of the Sui dynasty, starts a rebellion near Luoyang. Fearing attacks from two fronts, Yáng is forced to retreat his army.
- Isanapura becomes the capital of the Cambodian kingdom of Chenla (approximate date).

=== By topic ===
==== Religion ====
- Islam: Muhammad begins preaching in public. He spreads the message of Islam and encourages a personal devotion to God. Quraysh leaders of Mecca oppose any change in the traditional tribal and religious customs.

== Births ==
- Woncheuk, Korean Buddhist monk (d. 696)
- Aisha, wife of Muhammad (d. 678)

== Deaths ==
- April 22 – Saint Theodore of Sykeon, Byzantine ascetic
- Bledric ap Custennin, king of Dumnonia (England)
- Brunhilda, queen of Austrasia
- Priscus, Byzantine general
- Sigebert II, king of Austrasia
- Theuderic II, king of Austrasia
- Uncelen, Duke of Alemannia (Germany)
- Yang Xuangan, official of the Sui dynasty
