= Ermenberga =

Wisigoth princess, wife of Theodoric II

Queen consort of Burgundy
- Tenure: 606 – 607
- Spouse: Theuderic II
- Father: Witteric

Ermenberga (fl. 6th/7th centuries CE) was a Visigoth princess, a daughter of the king of Spain, Witteric

In 606 she married Theuderic II, the Frankish king of Burgundy.

Soon after the marriage, she was repudiated by Theuderic, supposedly at the insistence of Brunhild, Theuderic's grandmother, who may have seen Ermenberga as a challenge to her power. Brunhild, who wielded significant control over the kingdom and grandson, was even accused by some chroniclers - such as Aimoin - of using magic to sway Theuderic away from Ermenberga.

Some chronicles claim that Theuderic kept Ermenberga's dowry when he sent her back to Spain. Her eventual fate is uncertain. Her father Witteric, furious at this repudiation, attempted to form a military alliance against his former son-in-law, but failed.
