= 644 =

Calendar year

644 in various calendars
- Gregorian calendar: 644; DCXLIV
- Ab urbe condita: 1397
- Armenian calendar: 93; ԹՎ ՂԳ
- Assyrian calendar: 5394
- Balinese saka calendar: 565–566
- Bengali calendar: 50–51
- Berber calendar: 1594
- Buddhist calendar: 1188
- Burmese calendar: 6
- Byzantine calendar: 6152–6153
- Chinese calendar: 癸卯年 (Water Rabbit); 3341 or 3134 — to — 甲辰年 (Wood Dragon); 3342 or 3135
- Coptic calendar: 360–361
- Discordian calendar: 1810
- Ethiopian calendar: 636–637
- Hebrew calendar: 4404–4405
- Hindu calendars
- Vikram Samvat: 700–701
- Shaka Samvat: 565–566
- Kali Yuga: 3744–3745
- Holocene calendar: 10644
- Iranian calendar: 22–23
- Islamic calendar: 23–24
- Japanese calendar: N/A
- Javanese calendar: 535–536
- Julian calendar: 644; DCXLIV
- Korean calendar: 2977
- Minguo calendar: 1268 before ROC 民前1268年
- Nanakshahi calendar: −824
- Seleucid era: 955/956 AG
- Thai solar calendar: 1186–1187
- Tibetan calendar: ཆུ་མོ་ཡོས་ལོ་ (female Water-Hare); 770 or 389 or −383 — to — ཤིང་ཕོ་འབྲུག་ལོ་ (male Wood-Dragon); 771 or 390 or −382

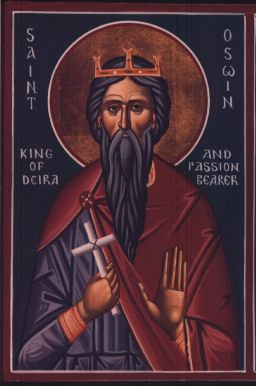
King Oswine of Deira (644–651)

Year 644 (DCXLIV) was a leap year starting on Thursday of the Julian calendar. The denomination 644 for this year has been used since the early medieval period, when the Anno Domini calendar era became the prevalent method in Europe for naming years.

== Events ==
=== By place ===
==== Asia ====
- Emperor Taizong of the Tang dynasty sends a Chinese expeditionary force, to invade and annex the Tarim Basin kingdom of Karasahr in Xinjiang, a vassal of the Western Turkic Khaganate. The oasis state is conquered, and Western Turks sent to assist Karasahr are defeated by the Tang forces.
- Zenkoji, a Buddhist temple and landmark spot in Nagano, Japan, is officially built by Empress Kogyoku.

==== Britain ====
- Oswine, son of the late king Osric of Deira, manages to establish himself as king of Deira (Northern England) despite armed objections from King Oswiu of Bernicia. His succession, probably the choice of the people of Deira, splits the Kingdom of Northumbria.

==== Byzantine Empire ====
- Valentinus, Byzantine general, attempts to usurp the throne of his son-in-law Constans II. He appears at the gates of Constantinople with a contingent of Byzantine troops, and demands to be crowned emperor. His claim is rejected, and Valentinus is lynched by the populace.

==== Islamic Empire ====
- November 3 – The second caliph Umar, r. 634–644, dies of wounds inflicted by the Persian slave Abu Lu'lu'a Firuz at Medina. On his death bed he appoints a committee to determine his successor. They select Uthman ibn Affan, who becomes the third caliph of the Rashidun Caliphate.

== Births ==
- K'inich K'an Joy Chitam II, ruler of Palenque
- Li Jiao, chancellor of the Tang dynasty (d. 713)

== Deaths ==
- January 17 – Sulpitius the Pious, French bishop and saint
- October 10 – Paulinus, Archbishop of York
- Otto, mayor of the palace (Austrasia)
- Radulf, king of Thuringia (approximate date)
- Trudpert, Irish missionary (or 607)
- Abu Lu'lu'a Firuz, assassin of Umar I
- Umar I, Muslim caliph (r. 634–644)
- Valentinus, Byzantine general and usurper
