= Andelot-Blancheville =

- Commune
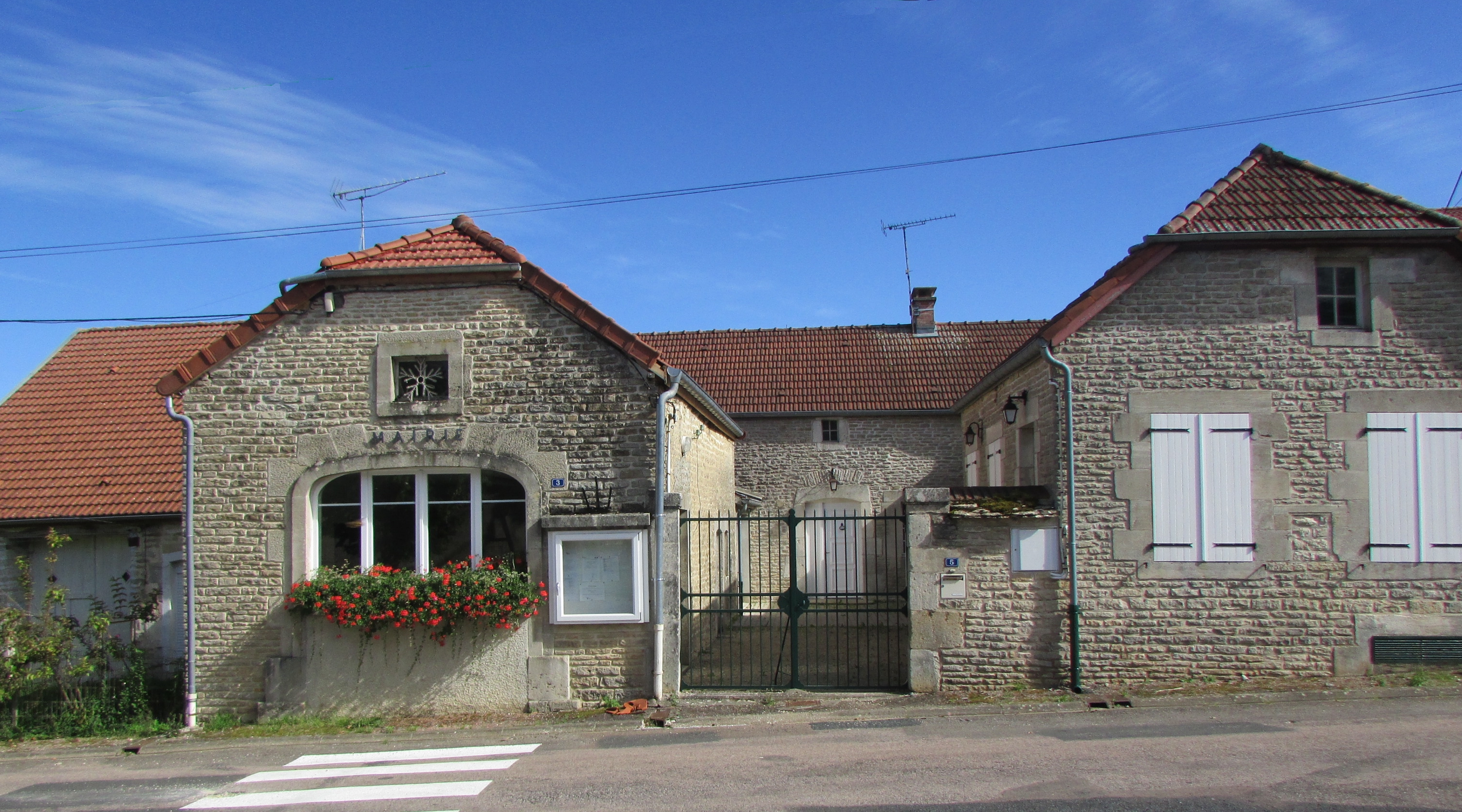
- The town hall in Andelot-Blancheville

- Coat of arms
- Location of Andelot-Blancheville
- Location within France Location within Grand Est
- Coordinates: 48°14′38″N 5°17′58″E
- Country: France
- Region: Grand Est
- Department: Haute-Marne
- Arrondissement: Chaumont
- Canton: Bologne
- Intercommunality: Meuse Rognon

Government
  - Mayor (2020–2026): Marie-France Joffroy
- Area^{1}: 33.18 km^{2} (12.81 sq mi)
- Elevation: 286 m (938 ft)
- Population (2023): 799
  - Density: 24.1/km^{2} (62.4/sq mi)
- Time zone: UTC+01:00 (CET)
  - Summer (DST): UTC+02:00 (CEST)
- INSEE/Postal code: 52008 /52700
- ^{1} French Land Register data, which excludes lakes, ponds, glaciers > 1 km^{2} (0.386 sq mi or 247 acres) and river estuaries.

Andelot-Blancheville (French pronunciation: [ɑ̃dlo blɑ̃ʃvil]) is a commune in the Haute-Marne department in the Grand Est region in northeastern France. It lies on the river Rognon, a tributary of the Marne.

== Population ==
Historical population
Year	Pop.	±% p.a.
1968	971	—
1975	916	−0.83%
1982	1,044	+1.89%
1990	1,024	−0.24%
1999	1,004	−0.22%
2007	935	−0.89%
2012	891	−0.96%
2017	870	−0.48%
2023	799	−1.41%
Source: INSEE

== Treaty (587) ==
It was the site of an important pact, known as the treaty of Andelot, by which king Guntram of Burgundy and queen Brunehaut agreed that Guntram was to adopt her and Sigebert I of Austrasia's son Childebert II as his successor, and ally himself with Childebert against the revolted leudes.

It also brought about the cession of Tours by Guntram to Childebert II.

== Personalities ==
- François de Coligny, the younger brother of the huguenots admiral Coligny and cardinal Coligny, born in 1521 at Châtillon-sur-Loing, was styled seigneur d'Andelot; but the castle of Andelot was not in the Andelot-Blancheville city, but at Andelot village (now called Andelot-Morval, in the Jura department).
- Michel Pignolet de Montéclair, composer, was born in Andelot.

== See also ==
- Communes of the Haute-Marne department
