= Quierzy =

- Commune
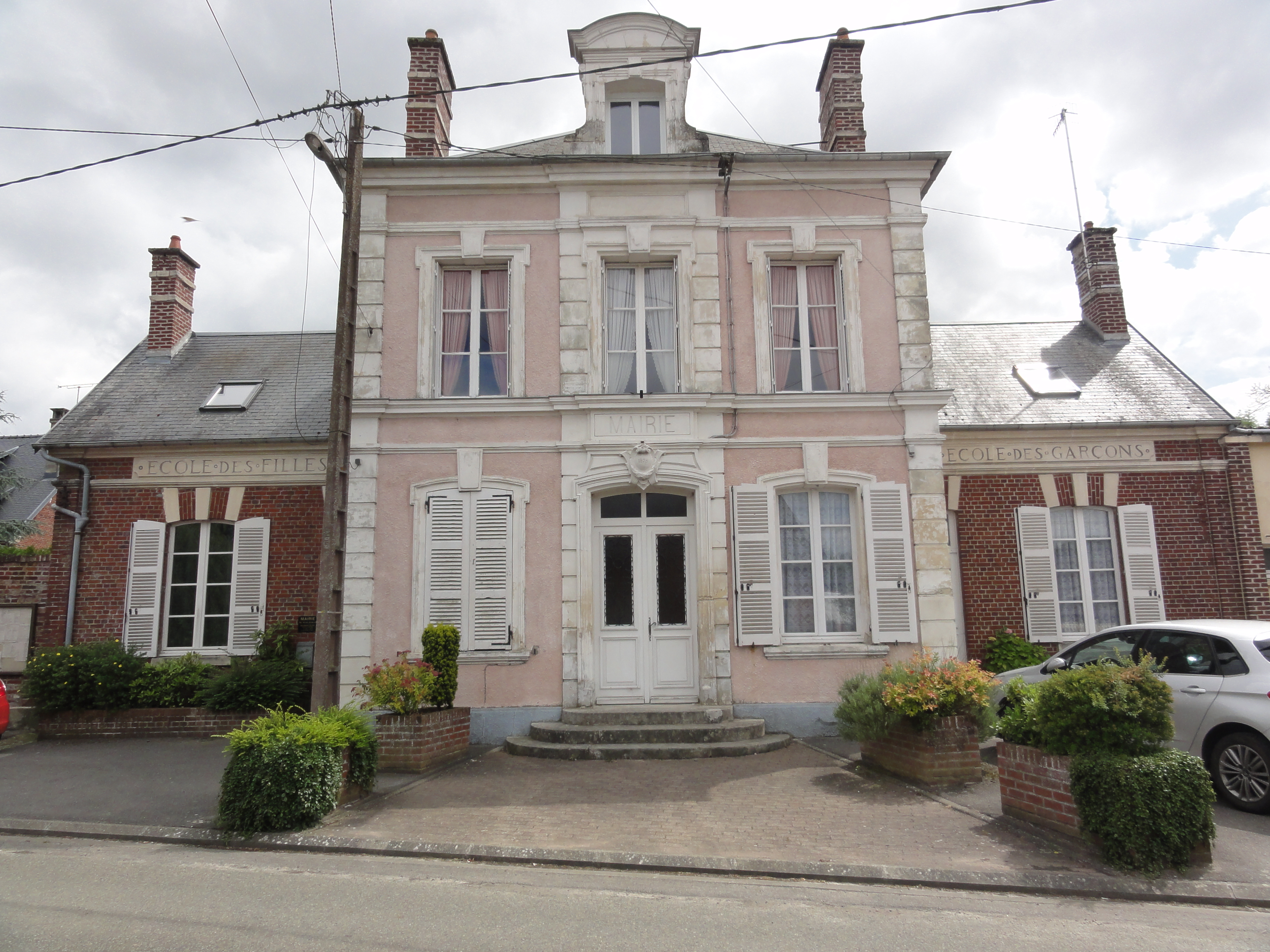
- The town hall and school of Quierzy

- Coat of arms
- Location of Quierzy
- Location within France Location within Hauts-de-France
- Coordinates: 49°34′17″N 3°08′39″E
- Country: France
- Region: Hauts-de-France
- Department: Aisne
- Arrondissement: Laon
- Canton: Vic-sur-Aisne
- Intercommunality: CA Chauny Tergnier La Fère

Government
  - Mayor (2026–32): Jérôme Gervais
- Area^{1}: 8.09 km^{2} (3.12 sq mi)
- Elevation: 45 m (148 ft)
- Highest elevation: 73 m (240 ft)
- Lowest elevation: 38 m (125 ft)
- Population (2023): 428
  - Density: 52.9/km^{2} (137/sq mi)
- Time zone: UTC+01:00 (CET)
  - Summer (DST): UTC+02:00 (CEST)
- INSEE/Postal code: 02631 /02300
- ^{1} French Land Register data, which excludes lakes, ponds, glaciers > 1 km^{2} (0.386 sq mi or 247 acres) and river estuaries.

Quierzy (French pronunciation: [kjɛʁzi]), also known as Quierzy-sur-Oise (French pronunciation: [kjɛʁzi syʁ waz]; formerly in Latin: Cariciacum, Carisiacum, Charisagum, Karisiacum), is a commune in the Aisne department in Hauts-de-France in northern France, straddling the Oise River between Noyon and Chauny.

== History ==
Today's peaceful village was the site of a major villa or palatium in the Merovingian and Carolingian eras, and the site of assemblies of the Frankish nobles, of synods of bishops and abbots and other important events. Here Charles Martel died, 22 October 741.

The name of the place appears variously in documents: Cariciacum, Carisiacum, Charisagum, Karisiacum. Of the royal residence of the Merovingians and the house of Pepin, only traces of earthworks remain, in fields outside Quierzy, in the direction of Manicamp. The early medieval Château de Quierzy on the bank of the Oise, rebuilt in the fifteenth century as the fortress of the bishops of Noyon, survives as a single tower.

Quierzy was already a significant stronghold of Neustria recorded in events in the Chronicle of Fredegar at the opening of the seventh century, when Protadius, the mayor of the palace of Burgundy was the noble lover of Brunhilda, the grandmother of and regent for King Theuderic II. Brunhilda pressured her grandson to go to war against her other grandson, Theudebert II of Austrasia, but when Theuderic assembled the army at Quierzy in 606, the men did not want to fight their fellow Franks: Protadius was promptly killed by the warriors, who forced the king to sign a treaty.

In January 754 Pepin the Short received Pope Stephen II at Quierzy, and his decision was taken to adopt the Roman liturgy and Gregorian chant in his domains. The Donation of Pippin is alleged to have been made at Quierzy to Pope Stephen II, granting him the Exarchate of Ravenna. For his part the pope legitimized the Carolingians. Charlemagne confirmed this donation in 774, in Rome.

Pepin spent the winter of 762 at Quierzy. Charlemagne convoked an assembly of the nobles here in January 775, in preparation of his invasion of Saxony. In 804 Pope Leo III met Charlemagne at Quierzy before proceeding to Aachen. In December 842 Charles the Bald married Ermentrude d'Orléans at Quierzy.

In the ninth century several councils of Quierzy debated contentious issues. At the synod of 853, the famous four decrees or chapters (capitula) drawn up by Hincmar, archbishop of Reims, on the questions of predestination were published, and Gottschalk condemned.

The Capitulary of Quierzy was promulgated in June 877 by the emperor Charles the Bald, comprising a series of measures for safeguarding the administration of his realm during his second Italian expedition, as well as directions for his son Louis the Stammerer, who was entrusted with the government during his father's absence. A great concourse of lords was assembled to hear it read. In this document Charles took elaborate precautions against Louis the German, whom he had every reason to distrust. He forbids him to sojourn in certain palaces and in certain forests, and compels him to swear not to despoil his stepmother Richilde of her allodial lands and benefices.

At the same time Charles refuses to allow Louis to nominate his candidates to the countships left vacant in the emperor's absence. The capitulary thus served as a guarantee to the aristocracy that the general usage would be followed in the existing circumstances, and also as a means of reassuring the counts who had accompanied the emperor into Italy as to the fate of their benefices.

In the following century, however, Viking raids destroyed the palatium, and Hugh Capet gave his lands at Quierzy to the bishop of Noyon, who built a fortress to serve in confrontations with the powerful lords of Coucy. In ensuing centuries, the lands of Quierzy passed successively to the Chérisy, the Montmorency, the Roye, the Halluin, the Brûlart and Bussy-Rabutin families, until the French Revolution.

== Geography ==
The town lies on the left bank of the river Oise, which flows westward through the commune. The river Ailette joins the Oise in the eastern part of the commune.

== Population ==
Historical population
Year	Pop.	±% p.a.
1968	335	—
1975	312	−1.01%
1982	342	+1.32%
1990	362	+0.71%
1999	335	−0.86%
2007	425	+3.02%
2012	440	+0.70%
2017	420	−0.93%
2023	428	+0.31%
Source: INSEE

== See also ==
- Communes of the Aisne department
- Councils of Quierzy
