= Protadius =

Mayor of the Palace of Burgundy from 604 to 606

Protadius (died 606) was the mayor of the palace of Burgundy from 604, when he displaced his rival Berthoald, until his death two years later. He was originally the noble lover of Brunhilda, the grandmother of and regent for King Theuderic II. She, however, desired to raise him to status in the kingdom and had him given the patricianship over the lands east of the Jura Mountains, whose duke, Wandalmar, had died in 604. She then conspired to do away with Berthoald, mayor of the palace, by sending him with only 300 men to the region of the Seine. Attacked by Clotaire II of Neustria's son, Merovech, and his mayor, Landric, Berthoald died in the ensuing battle when he realised that he had nothing to lose, for he was no longer safe at court.

Protadius was appointed to succeed Berthoald, though the Chronicle of Fredegar remarks that he had the capabilities of his predecessor, but not his virtues. Perhaps frightened by the same schemes which had ensured his elevation, he undermined the nobility to secure his position and was an exceedingly cruel extortionist. His paramour Brunhilda pressured her grandson to go to war against her other grandson, Theudebert II of Austrasia, and Protadius was put in charge of the army. At the palace of Quierzy, Theuderic assembled the army, but the men did not want to fight their countrymen and the Duke of Alemannia, Uncelen, declared that the king ordered Protadius' death. Protadius was killed by the warriors and the king was forced to sign a treaty.

== Sources ==
- Venning, Timothy (2017). A Chronology of Early Medieval Western Europe, 450–1066. Taylor & Francis. ISBN 9781351589161.

Preceded by Berthoald	Mayor of the Palace of Burgundy; 604–606	Succeeded by Claudius
