= Witteric =

- King of the Visigoths
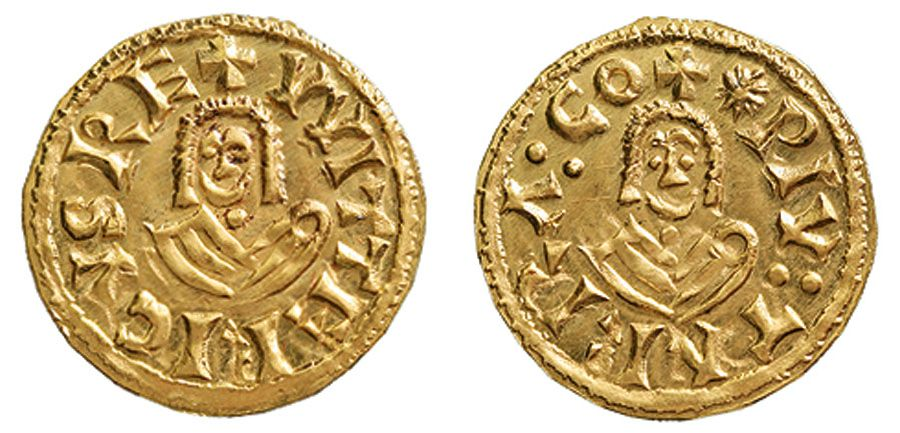
- Tremissis minted in Tarraco during his reign and bearing his effigy.
- Reign: June/July 603 – April 610
- Predecessor: Liuva II
- Successor: Gundemar
- Born: c. 565
- Died: April 610; Toledo
- Burial: Toledo
- Issue: Ermenberga
- Religion: Arian; possibly Chalcedonian Christianity after 589

Witteric (Spanish: Witerico; Portuguese and Galician: Viterico; c. 565 – April 610) was the Visigoth King of Hispania, Septimania and Galicia. He ruled from 603 to 610.

== Rise to power ==
The first mention of Witteric in history was as a conspirator with Sunna (bishop), the Arian bishop of Mérida, to reestablish Arianism in 589. While Sunna was sent into exile, it is unknown what happened to Witteric. In the spring of 602, Witteric was given command of the army with the job of expelling the Byzantines. However, when it came time to do so in the Spring of 603, Witteric instead led his troops against King Liuva II, counting on the support of a faction of nobles in opposition to the dynasty of Leovigild. He invaded the royal palace and deposed the young king. Witteric cut off the king's right hand, and then had him condemned and executed in the summer of 603.

== Reign ==
During his reign, the Visigoths fought the Byzantines. However, Isidore of Seville is dismissive of Witteric's accomplishments, writing that "although he frequently fought battles against the Roman soldiers, he did not win any adequate glory except for capturing some soldiers at Sagunto with the help of his generals." The campaign against Sagunto probably took place in 605. It was probably during his reign, as well, that Bigastrum (near Cartago Nova) was taken, as its bishop appears in a council of Toledo in 610.

In the twelfth year of his reign, king Theodoric II sent for bishop Aridius of Lyons and the constable Eborin to ask Witteric for his daughter Ermenberga's hand in marriage. Although the envoys gave their word that she would not be disowned by Theodoric, and she was received by Theodoric in Chalon-sur-Saône (606), his grandmother, the regent Brunhilda and Theodoric's sister Teudila (or Teudilana) did not provide a welcoming reception. Theodoric then disgraced Ermenberga by sending her back without her dowry. Incensed, Witteric entered into a quadruple alliance with Theodobert II of Austrasia, Clotaire II of Neustria, and Agilulf of the Lombards to effect his deposition and death. Despite their mutual fear of Theodoric, their alliance did not accomplish anything; according to Fredegar, "Theodoric got wind of it [the alliance] but treated it with utter contempt.".

== Assassination ==
In April 610, a faction of Catholic nobles conspired against Witteric and assassinated him during a banquet. His body was dragged ignominiously through the streets and he was later buried without the honors corresponding to his status. The nobles then proclaimed Gundemar, Duke of Narbonne, king.

Regnal titles
Preceded by Liuva II	King of the Visigoths; June/July 603 – April 610	Succeeded by Gundemar
