= Berthoald =

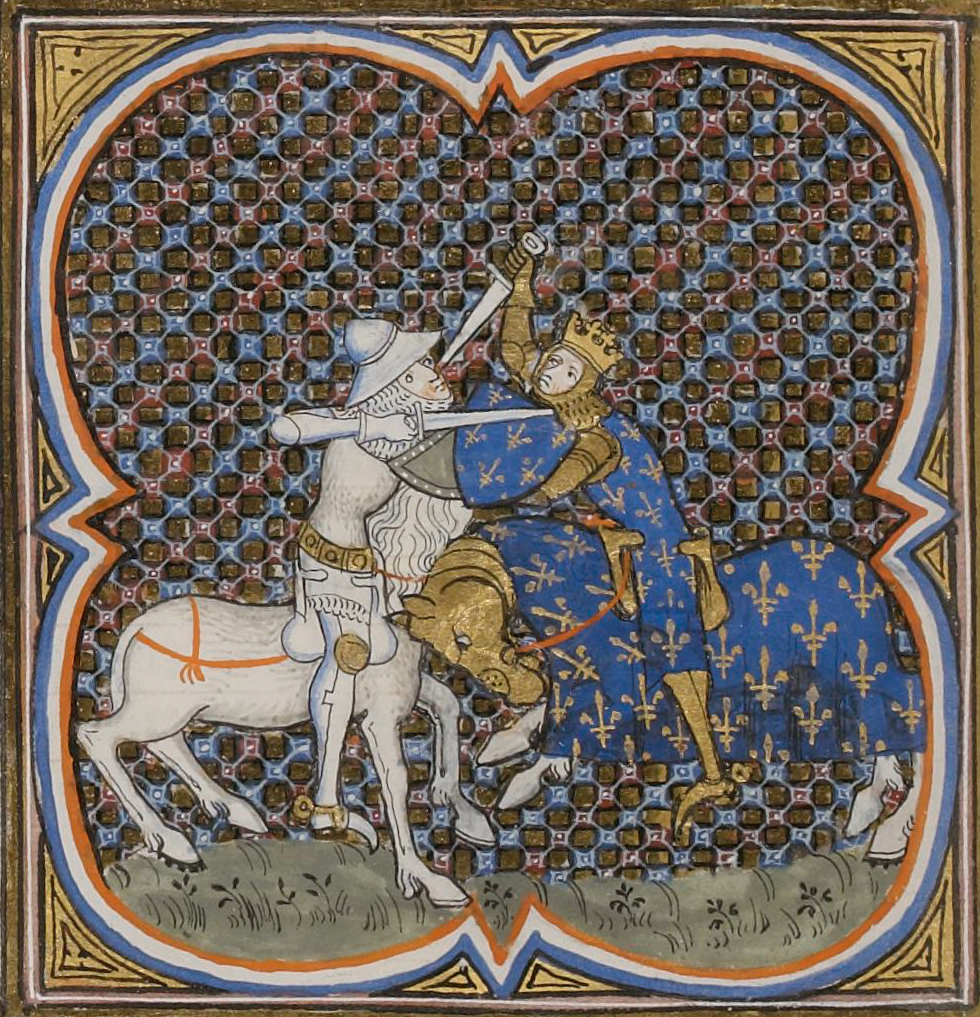
Single-handed combat between Clotaire II and Bertoald. Bibliotheque Nationale de France

Berthoald (or Bertoald) (died 604) was the mayor of the palace of Burgundy from some time before 603, (when he is first mentioned as mayor under King Theuderic II) until his death in the next year. According to the Burgundian chronicler Fredegar, he was moderate, sensible, brave, and honest.

In 604, Theuderic, at the suggestion of his grandmother Brunhilda, sent Berthoald to inspect the royal villae along the Seine, in order to have him away from court so that he might be conveniently killed. Brunhilda intended to raise her paramour Protadius to Berthoald's honours. Berthoald and three hundred men were at Arèle when King Clotaire II of Neustria—alerted by some means to his presence— sent an army under his son Merovech and his mayor Landric to assault him. Berthoald fled to Orléans, and Landric followed and besieged him, which violated a peace treaty with Theuderic. The king of Burgundy went out at Christmas to Étampes and met the forces of Merovech and Landric. Defeating them with the aid of Berthoald, he took Paris. Berthoald was killed in battle, having charged the enemy too far, with no regard for his own life, which he knew was in danger at court because of the plottings on behalf of Protadius. Protadius was indeed made mayor of the palace after him.

== Sources ==
- Reuter, Timothy (1979). The Medieval Nobility: Studies on the Ruling Classes of France and Germany from the Sixth to the Twelfth Century. North Holland Publishing Company. ISBN 9780444851369.
- Sismondi, Jean-Charles-Léonard Simonde (1976). The French Under the Merovingians and the Carlovingians. AMS Press. ISBN 9780404566692.

Preceded by Warnachar I	Mayor of the Palace of Burgundy until 604	Succeeded by Protadius
