= Uncelen =

Duke of Alemannia from 587 to 607

Uncelen, Uncelin, or Uncilin (from Latin Uncelenus; died c. 613) was the Duke of Alemannia from 587 to 607. He was appointed to replace Leutfred by the Austrasian king Childebert II.

On Childebert's death in 595, the Thurgau, Kembsgau, and Alsace passed to the Kingdom of Burgundy, then under the rule of Theuderic II.

In 605 Theuderic went to war with his brother Theudebert II, who ruled Austrasia. His army, which did not wish to go to war, he placed under the command of his majordomo Protadius with instructions to induce the soldiers to fight. The next year (606) at Quierzy-sur-Oise, Theuderic re-assembled the army, but the men once again refused to fight their countrymen and the king ordered Uncelen to coerce them. Uncelen, however, declared that the king had ordered the Protadius' death. The despised majordomo was killed by the warriors and the king was forced to sign a treaty. Queen Brunhilda, who had induced Theuderic to war, had Uncelen's foot cut off. According to the Lex Alamannorum, a duke was only eligible for office if he could mount a horse. Being unable to continue exercising his office, Uncelen was removed.

== Sources ==
- Fuchs, Karlheinz; Kempa, Martin; Redies, Rainer. Die Alamannen (Ausstellungskatalog). Stuttgart: Verlag Theiß, 2001. ISBN 3-8062-1535-9.
- Geuenich, Dieter. Geschichte der Alemannen. Stuttgart: Kohlhammer Verlag, 2004. ISBN 3-17-018227-7.

== See also ==
- Duchy of Alemannia
