= Landric =

Landric (or Landeric, French: Landry, † 613) was the mayor of the palace of Neustria. According to the Vita Aldegundis, he and his probable brother Gundoland were uncles of Saint Aldegunda. The chief sources for his reign are the Chronicle of Fredegar and the Liber Historiae Francorum.

Landric was a supporter of Fredegund in her conflict with Brunhilda. He fought for her at Brinnacum, an unknown location, against Childebert II soon after the latter's succession to Burgundy in 592.

In 604, he is recorded as maior domus in Neustria for the first time. In that year, he and Merovech, son of Clotaire II, were sent by Clotaire to attack Berthoald, the Burgundian mayor. They were defeated and Merovech captured. Landric was succeeded as mayor by Gundoland.

== Sources ==
- Wallace-Hadrill, J. M., translator. The Fourth Book of the Chronicle of Fredegar with its Continuations. Greenwood Press: Connecticut, 1960.
