= Dormelles =

- Commune
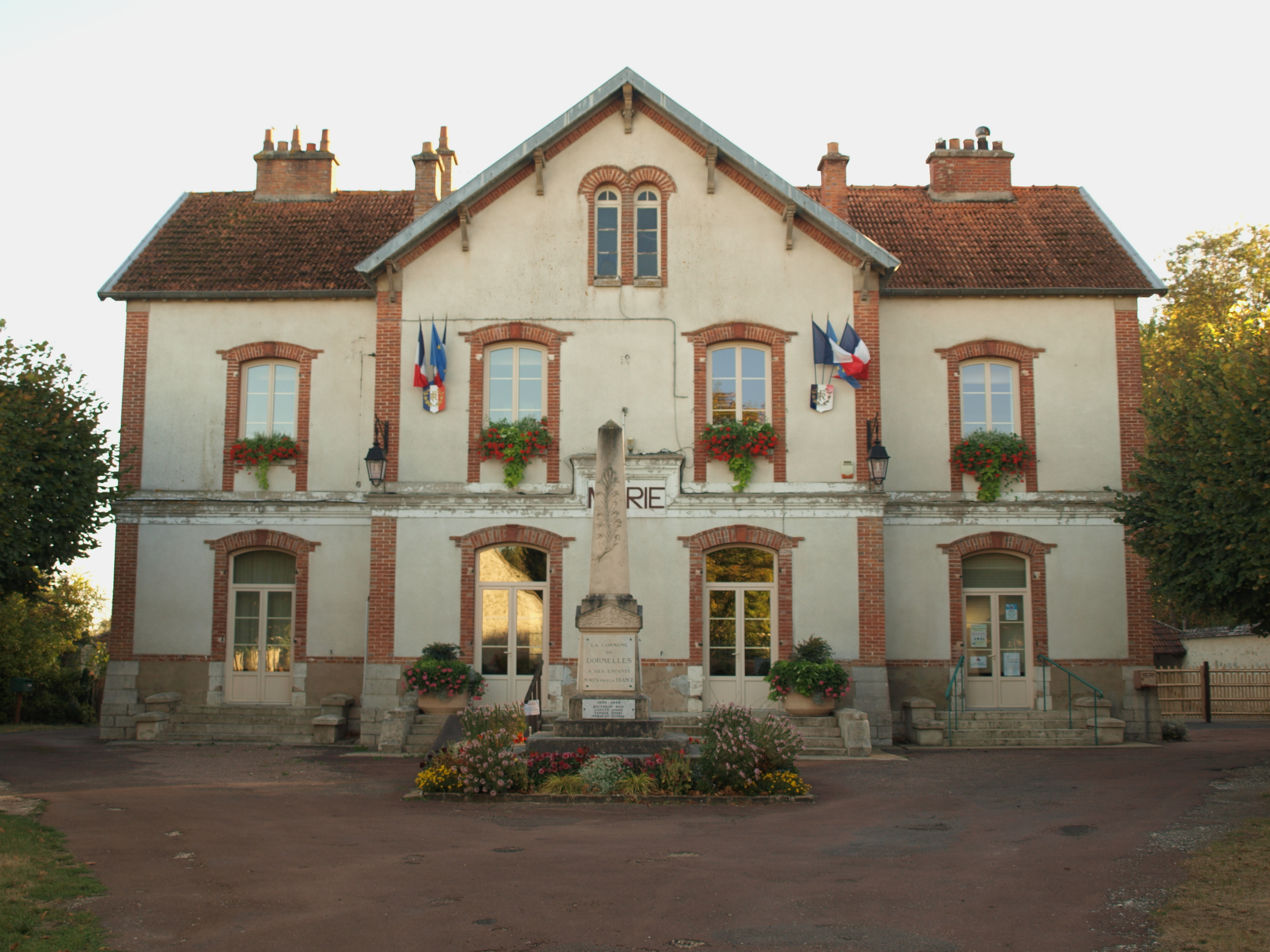
- The town hall in Dormelles
- Location of Dormelles
- Location within France Location within Île-de-France (region)
- Coordinates: 48°18′58″N 2°54′05″E
- Country: France
- Region: Île-de-France
- Department: Seine-et-Marne
- Arrondissement: Fontainebleau
- Canton: Nemours
- Intercommunality: CC Moret Seine et Loing

Government
  - Mayor (2020–2026): Francis Largillière
- Area^{1}: 13.02 km^{2} (5.03 sq mi)
- Highest elevation: 136 m (446 ft)
- Lowest elevation: 62 m (203 ft)
- Population (2023): 816
  - Density: 62.7/km^{2} (162/sq mi)
- Time zone: UTC+01:00 (CET)
  - Summer (DST): UTC+02:00 (CEST)
- INSEE/Postal code: 77161 /77130
- ^{1} French Land Register data, which excludes lakes, ponds, glaciers > 1 km^{2} (0.386 sq mi or 247 acres) and river estuaries.

Dormelles (French pronunciation: [dɔʁmɛl]) is a commune in the Seine-et-Marne department in the Île-de-France region in north-central France.

== History ==
Dormelles was the site of a battle circa 599 between rival Merovingian kings. Chlothar II, ruler of Neustria, faced his cousins, Theuderic II, King of Burgundy, and Theudebert II, King of Austrasia. Chlothar's army suffered a heavy defeat and he fled the field.

== Demographics ==
Inhabitants of Dormelles are called Dormellois.

== See also ==
- Communes of the Seine-et-Marne department
