= Treaty of Andelot =

587 treaty between Burgundy and Austrasia

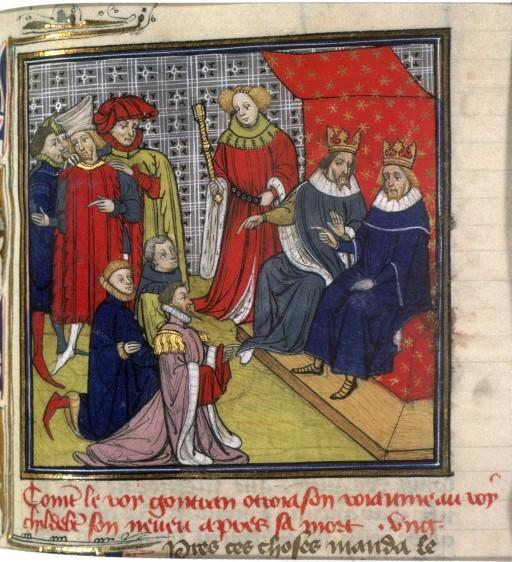
Guntram and Childebert II, from the Grandes Chroniques de France.

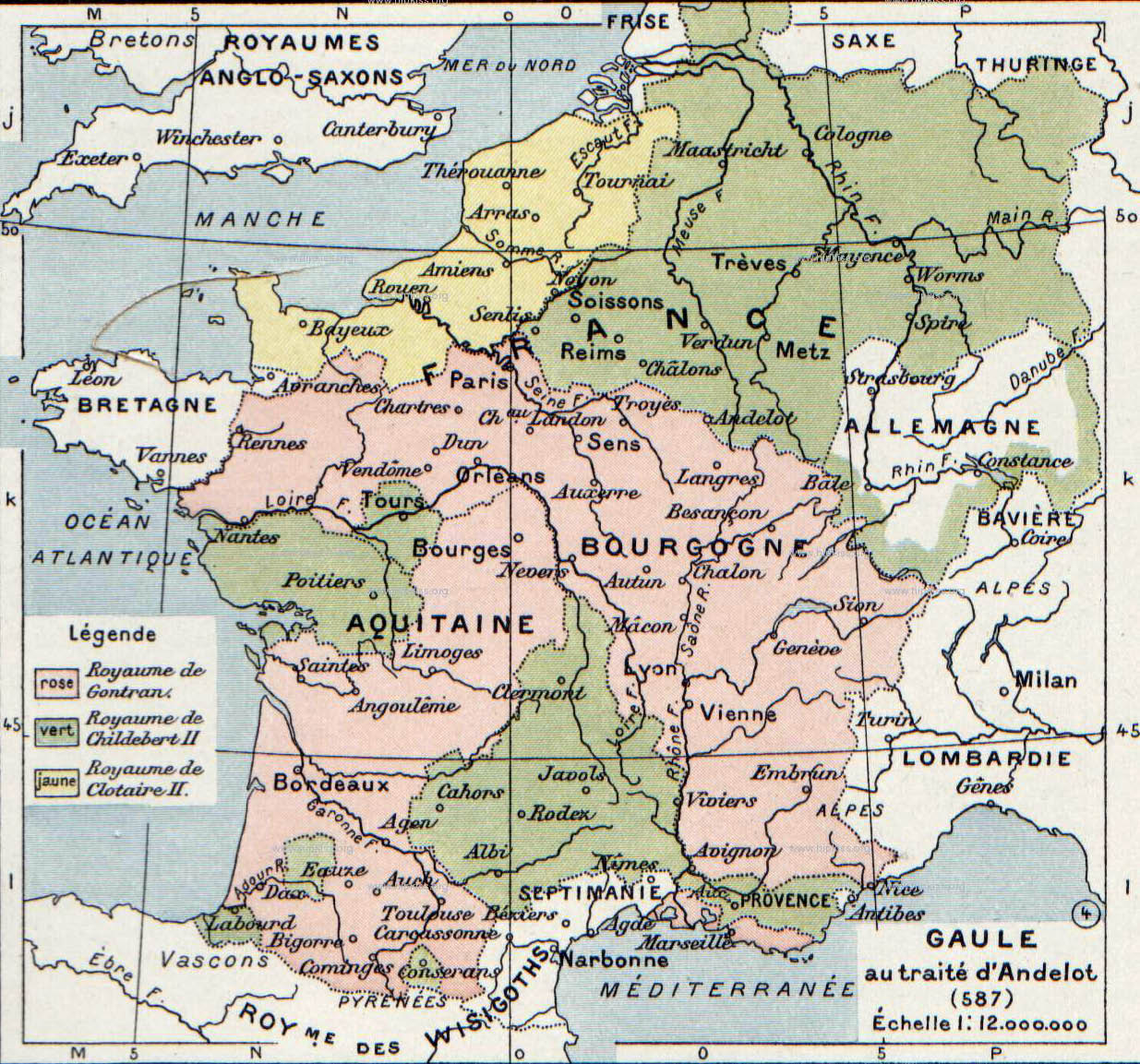
The division of Gaul after the Andelot treaty

The Treaty of Andelot (or Pact of Andelot) was signed at Andelot-Blancheville in 587 between King Guntram of Burgundy and Queen Brunhilda of Austrasia. Based on the terms of the accord, Brunhilda agreed that Guntram adopt her son Childebert II as his successor and ally himself with Childebert against the revolted leudes. Gregory of Tours wrote in his Historia Francorum that in the thirteenth year of Childebert, he went on an embassy for the king from Metz to Chalon to meet Guntram, who alleged that prior promises were being broken, especially concerning the division of Senlis. Significantly to Gregory, the treaty brought about the cession of Tours by Guntram to Childebert. An agreement was provided in writing and Gregory preserves the text of the treaty in his history.

== See also ==
- List of treaties
- Burgundy
- Neustria
- Austrasia

== Bibliography ==
- History of the Franks: Books I–X. Gregory of Tours, trans. Ernest Brehaut (1916).
