= Paterius =

Paterius (died 606) was a bishop of Brescia. He is known as a compiler, in particular of works of Pope Gregory I, for whom he had worked as a notary.

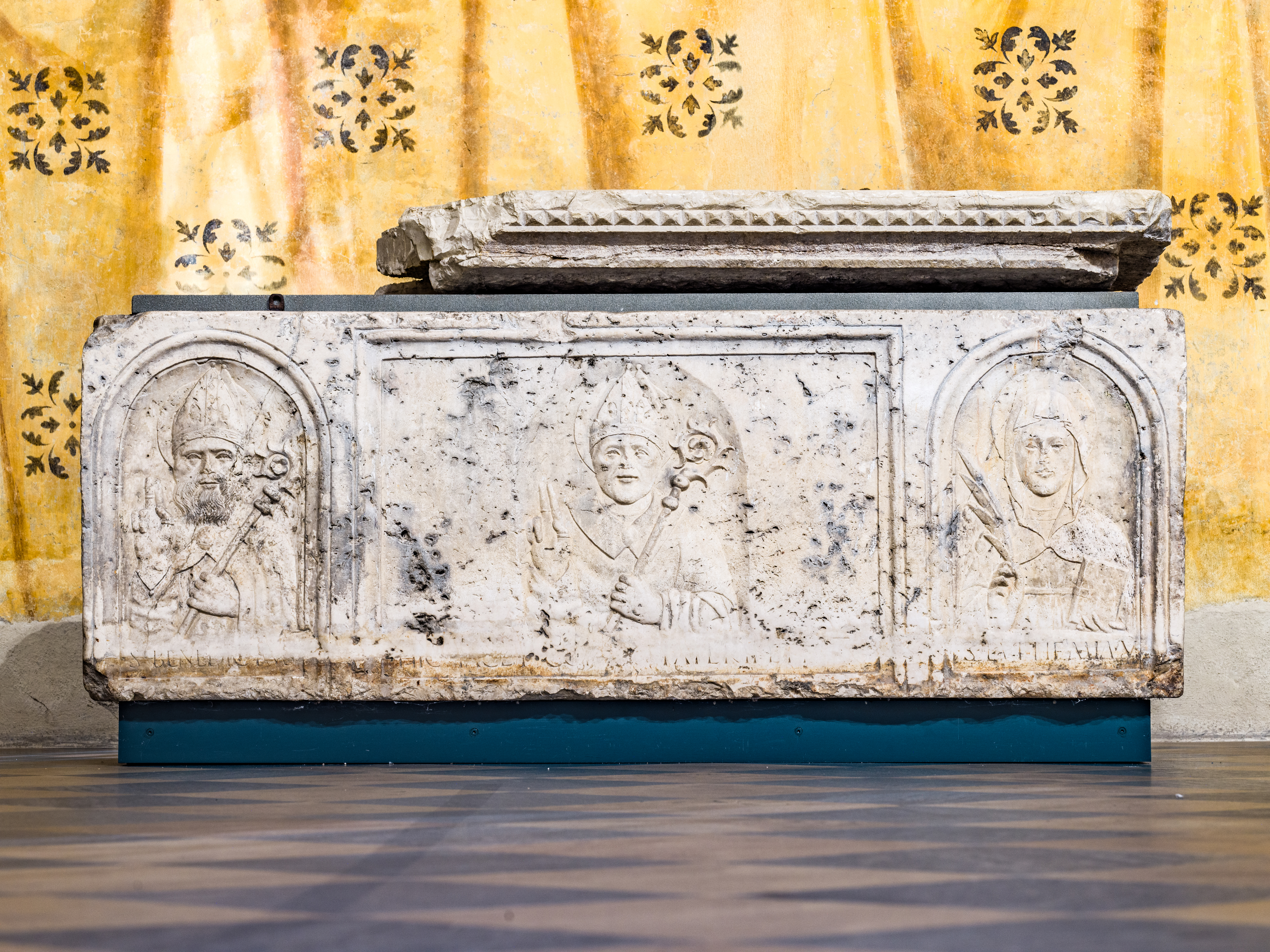
Sarcophagus of Saint Paterius bishop of Brescia in the Coro delle Monache in the Museo di Santa Giulia in Brescia

His sole surviving work is the Liber testimoniorum veteris testamenti, an anthology of Gregory's works of biblical exegesis, arranged in the order of the biblical passages discussed. The work survives in over 120 complete or partial manuscripts.
