= Theuderic II =

Merovingian king of Burgundy (c. 595–613)

- Tremissis struck during Theuderic’s reign as king of Burgundy. Minted in Avenches around 596-613

King of Burgundy
- Reign: 595–613
- Predecessor: Childebert II
- Successor: Sigebert II

King of Austrasia
- Reign: 612–613
- Predecessor: Theudebert II
- Successor: Sigebert II
- Born: c. 587
- Died: c. 613 (aged 26)
- Spouse: Ermenberga (m. 606; annulled 607)
- Issue: Sigebert II; Childebert; Corbus; Merovech
- House: Merovingian dynasty
- Father: Childebert II
- Mother: Faileuba

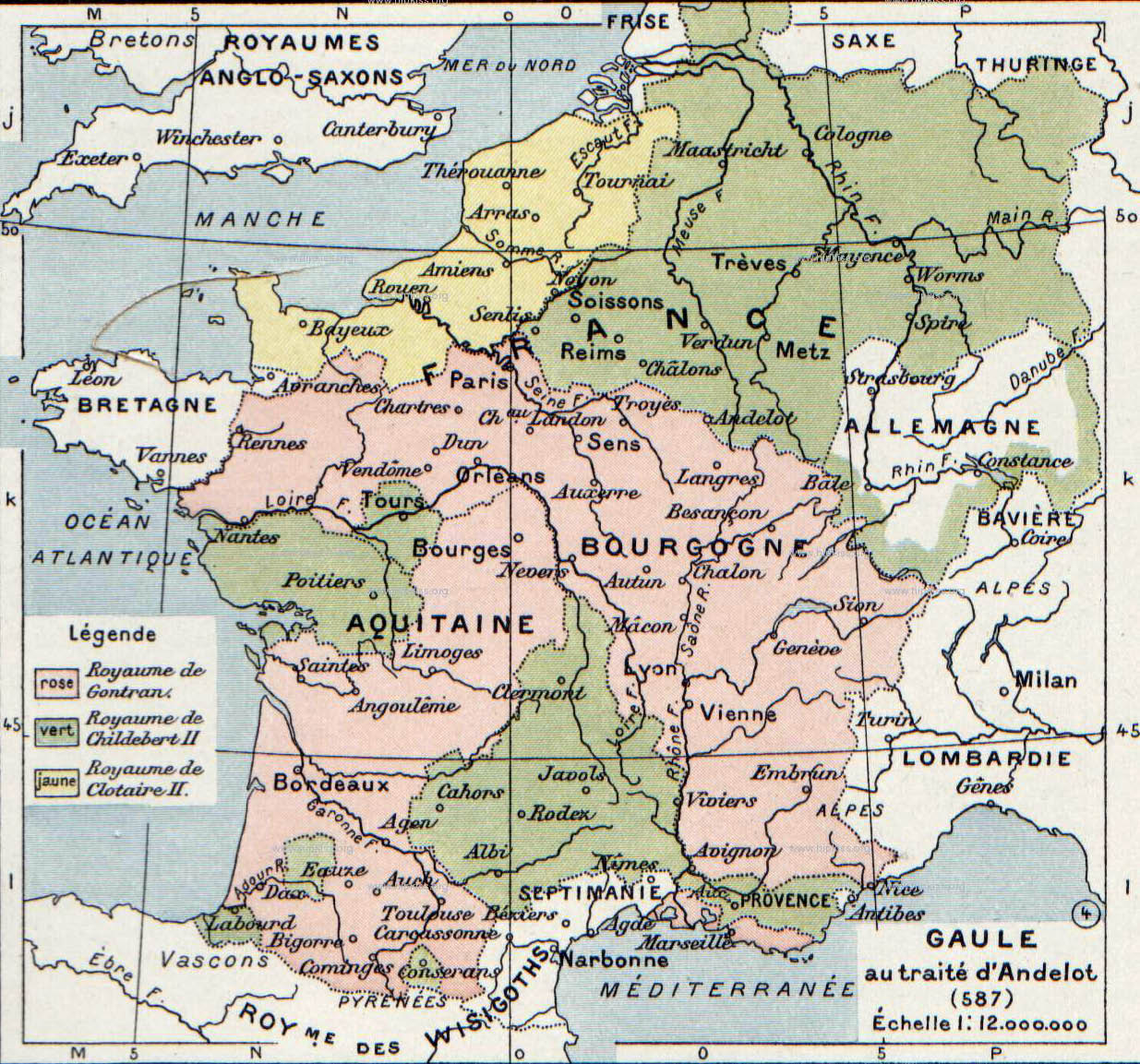
The Frankish realm as it was after the Treaty of Andelot in 587. The Burgundian kingdom of Guntram (pink) was inherited first by Childebert II and then by Theuderic II.

Theuderic II (also spelled Theuderich, Theoderic or Theodoric; in French, Thierry) (c. 587–613), king of Burgundy (595–613) and Austrasia (612–613), was the second son of Childebert II. At his father's death in 595, he received Guntram's kingdom of Burgundy, with its capital at Orléans, while his elder brother, Theudebert II, received their father's kingdom of Austrasia, with its capital at Metz. He also received the lordship of the cities (civitates) of Toulouse, Agen, Nantes, Angers, Saintes, Angoulême, Périgueux, Blois, Chartres, and Le Mans. During his minority, and later, he reigned under the guidance of his grandmother Brunhilda, evicted from Austrasia by his brother Theudebert II.

In 596, Clotaire II, king of Neustria, and Fredegund, Clotaire's mother, took Paris, which was supposed to be held in common. Fredegund, then her son's regent, sent a force to Laffaux and the armies of Theudebert and Theuderic were defeated.

In 599, Brunhilda was forced out of Austrasia by Theudebert and she was found wandering near Arcis in Champagne by a peasant, who brought her to Theuderic. The peasant was supposedly rewarded with the bishopric of Auxerre. Theuderic welcomed her and readily fell under her influence, which was inclined to vengeful war with Theudebert at the time. Soon, Theuderic and his brother were at war. He defeated Theudebert at Sens, but their cousin Clotaire's restless warmaking prompted them to ally against him. They resumed the fight against Neustria and, in 600, defeated Clotaire at Dormelles (near Montereau) on the Orvanne. The land between the Seine and the Oise was divided between Theuderic and Theudebert, with Theuderic receiving the territory between the Seine and the Loire including the Breton frontier. They also campaigned together in Gascony, where they subjugated the local population and instated Genialis as duke.

At this point, however, the two brothers took up arms against each other resulting in Theuderic's defeat of Theudebert at Étampes. Theuderic's kingdom was invaded by Clotaire in 604, and was also confronted by Clotaire's son Merovech and his mayor Landric. Theuderic met them at Étampes on the Louet, but Theudebert refused him aid. Theuderic won the day, but his mayor of the palace, Berthoald was killed. The next mayor, Protadius, a partisan of Brunhilda, encouraged war with Austrasia, but the nobles assassinated him and battle was never met, a pact being enforced by Theuderic's men. In 610, he lost Alsace, the Saintois, the Thurgau, and Champagne to his brother and his men east of the Jura Mountains were soundly defeated by the Alemanni. However, he routed Theudebert at Toul (c.611) and later at Tolbiac in 612. He captured the fleeing Theudebert in the latter battle and gave him over—after taking his royal paraphernalia—to his grandmother Brunhilda, who had him put up in a monastery. Bishop Ludegast is said to have beseeched him in a fable to spare Theudeberts life. Brunhilda probably had Theudebert murdered (along with his son Merovech) to allow Theuderic to succeed to both thrones unhindered. Theuderic died of dysentery in his Austrasian capital of Metz in late 613 while preparing a campaign against his longtime enemy, Clotaire, who had, based on a treaty with Theuderic during the last fraternal war, retaken the duchy of Dentelin.

== Family ==
Theuderic married Ermenberga, the daughter of the Visigothic king of Spain, Witteric, at Chalon in 606, However, the next year (607), he sent her home in disgrace and a quadruple alliance of Clotaire, Theudebert, Witteric, and the Lombard king Agilulf connived against him, but it all came to naught. Thus depriving himself of the opportunity of having legitimate offspring, he was succeeded by his son Sigebert II under the regency of Brunhilda.

Theuderic had four sons by unnamed mistresses:

- Sigebert II (601–613), who succeeded him in both his realms
- Childebert (born 602, date of death unknown)
- Corbus (603–613)
- Merovech (born 604, date of death unknown), godson of Clotaire II

== Sources ==
- Wood, Ian (1994). The Merovingian Kingdoms, 450-751. Longman.
- Wallace-Hadrill, J.M., translator. The Fourth Book of the Chronicle of Fredegar with its Continuations Connecticut: Greenwood Press, 1960.

Theuderic II Merovingian dynasty Born: 587 Died: 613
Preceded by Childebert II	King of Burgundy; 595–613	Succeeded by Sigebert II
Preceded by Theudebert II	King of Austrasia; 612–613	Succeeded by Sigebert II
