= Theudebert II =

Merovingian king of Austrasia (c. 500–547)

Theudebert II *Þeudoberhtaz
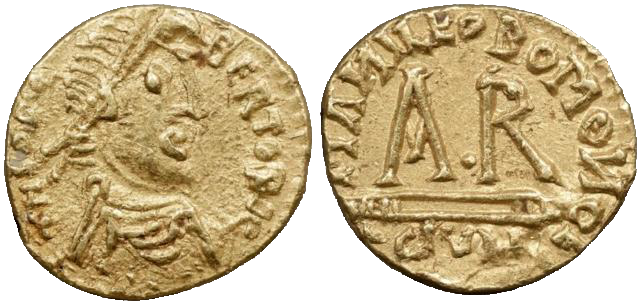

King of Austrasia
- Reign: 595–612
- Predecessor: Childebert II
- Successor: Theuderic II
- Born: c. 585
- Died: c. 612 (aged 27)
- Spouse: Bilichild; Theodechildis
- Issue: Emma of Austrasia; Merovech
- House: Merovingian dynasty
- Father: Childebert II
- Mother: Faileuba

Theudebert II (French: Thibert or Théodebert) (c. 585–612), King of Austrasia (595–612 AD), was the son and heir of Childebert II. He received the kingdom of Austrasia plus the cities (civitates) of Poitiers, Tours, Le Puy-en-Velay, Bordeaux, and Châteaudun, as well as the Champagne, the Auvergne, and Transjurane Alemannia.

During his early years, his grandmother Brunhilda ruled for Theudebert and his brother Theuderic II, who had received the realm of Burgundy. After the two brothers reached adulthood, they were often at war, with Brunhilda siding with Theuderic. In 599, he expelled his grandmother from his court, possibly at the instigation of the nobility, who had grown tired of Brunhilda’s influence on the King. She then went to his younger brother who readily accepted their grandmother at his court. She instigated a short but vengeful war between the brothers in the same year and Theuderic defeated Theudebert in a pinched battle at Sens, but when their cousin Chlothar II saw an opportunity to expand his realm, he invaded Neustria. Under their grandmother, the two brothers made a temporary truce and allied against their cousin, defeating him in a battle at Dormelles (near Montereau), thereby laying their hands on a great portion of Cholthar’s part of Neustria (600–604). At this point, however, the two brothers took up arms against each other for the second time; Theuderic defeated Theudebert at Étampes. In 605, Theudebert refused to aid his brother whose kingdom was invaded by Clothar II. In 610, Theudebert extorted Alsace from his brother and Theuderic took up arms against him, yet again for a third time.

In a final engagement between the two brothers during this civil war, Theudebert was defeated decisively by Theuderic twice, first at Toul and then at Zülpich in 612. Theudebert was deposed and locked up in a monastery at the order of his grandmother, and later killed along with his son Merovech.

He was married to Bilichild. His daughter Emma is sometimes thought to have married Eadbald of Kent.

== Sources ==
- Murray, Alexander C. (2018). "Theudebert II". In Nicholson, Oliver (ed.). The Oxford Dictionary of Late Antiquity, Volume 1: A–I. Oxford: Oxford University Press. ISBN 978-0-19-881624-9.
- Oman, Charles (1908). The Dark Ages, 476-918. Rivingtons.
- Russell, Jeffrey Burton (2005). Medieval Civilization. Wipf and Stock Publishers. ISBN 9781597521031.

Theudebert II Merovingian dynasty Born: 586 Died: 612
| Preceded by Childebert II | King of Austrasia; 595–612 | Succeeded by Theuderic II |
