= Charles Bovary =

Character in the novel Madame Bovary

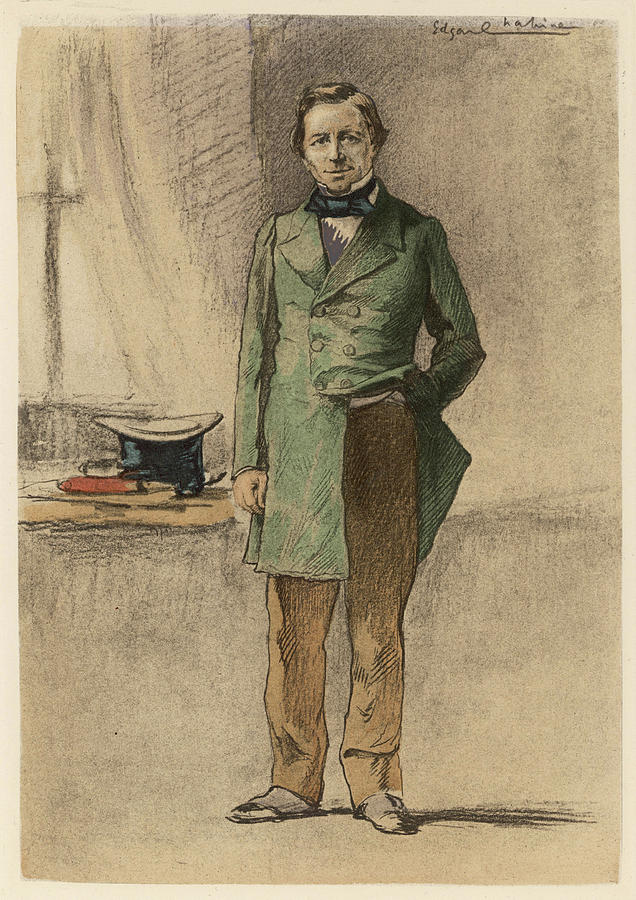
Charles Bovary in an illustration by Edgar Chahine for a 1935 edition of Gustave Flaubert's novel

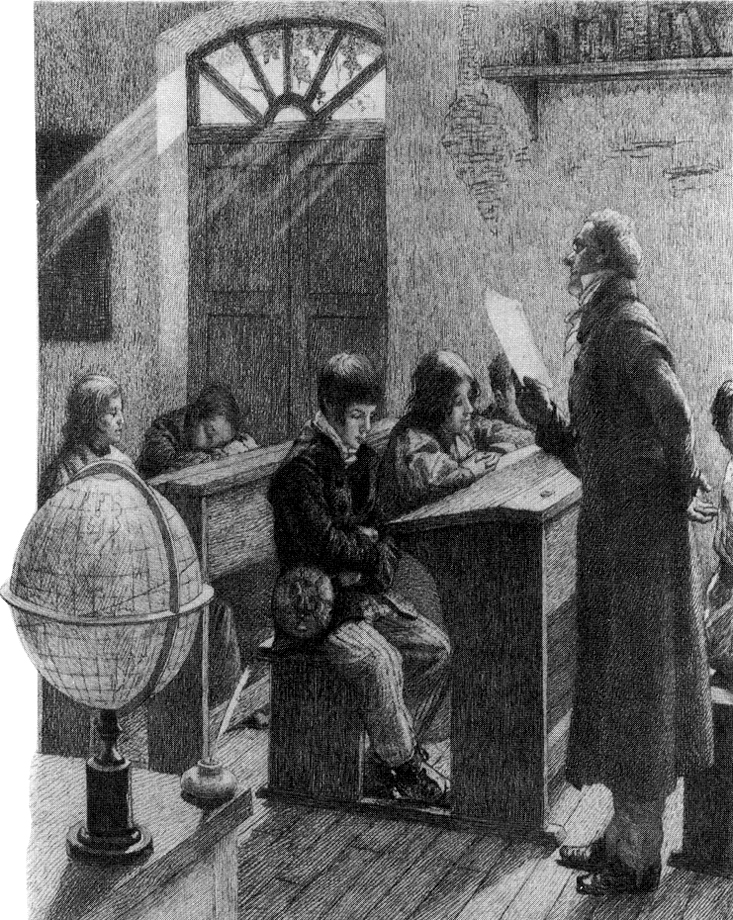
Charles's first day at school, illustrated by Alfred de Richemont and Carlo Chessa, 1905

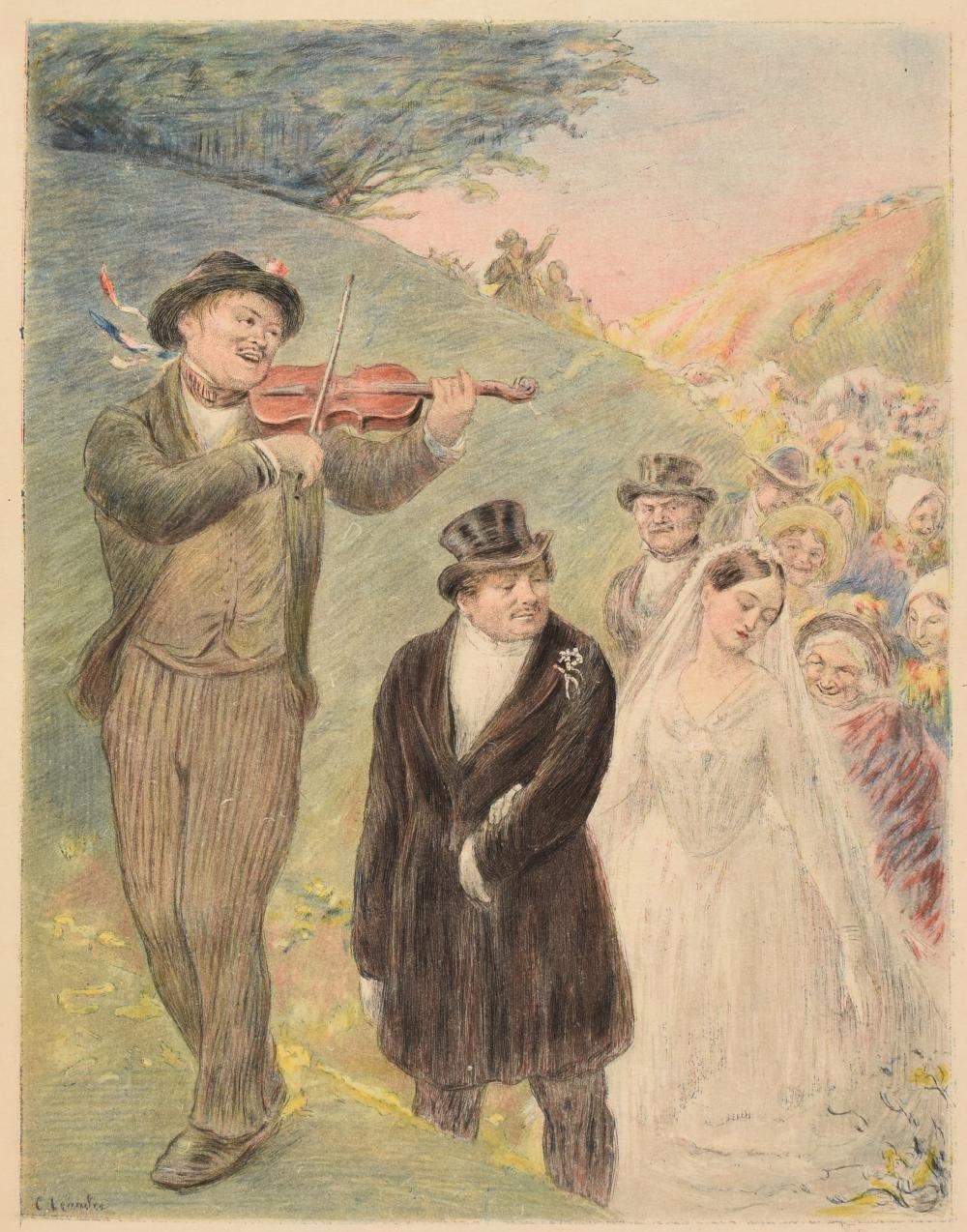
The marriage of Charles Bovary and Emma Rouault, etching by Eugène Decisy from a watercolour by Charles Léandre, 1931

Charles Bovary is one of the main characters in Madame Bovary, a novel by the Rouen author Gustave Flaubert published in 1857. He fails both in his professional life, as a country doctor, and in his sentimental life as the husband of Emma Bovary née Rouault, a romantic, unfaithful and unsatisfied woman who ends up committing suicide.

== The complexity of the character ==
=== An unpretentious entrance ===
The novel opens with a full-length portrait of him. A large part of chapter I of the first part is devoted to his education, which is rather negative and does not make him happy. He is torn from childhood between on the one hand his father, a former surgeon in the army, a supporter of Spartan education, who, "playing the philosopher", teaches him to walk barefoot, to "drink off large draughts of rum and to jeer at religious processions" and who, throughout the novel, shows himself to be a drinker and rude, and on the other his mother, an excessively protective woman who arranges his first marriage to a rich widow. This one, already old, ugly and unpleasant, brings him no happiness and soon dies.

In the first part of Madame Bovary, Flaubert paints an unfavourable portrait of Charles: he had "his hair...cut square on his forehead", "legs in blue-stockings", "ill-cleaned hob-nailed boots". Tall but awkward and clumsy, his appearance betrays the countryman, wearing an improbable cap for which Flaubert multiplies comical comparisons ranging from the bearskin to the nightcap. The headgear falls to the ground again and again, provoking mockery from his classmates and his teacher, and he pronounces his name with a very approximate "Charbovari".

=== An unassuming character ===
The beginning of the novel is centred on the character of Charles: during the first chapters, he appears alone, then Emma is only seen through his admiring gaze. Subsequently, he is either physically absent, or distracted, drowsy, as if foreign to his surroundings. When he marries Emma, whom he has met while coming to care for her father, the rich farmer Rouault, even his moment of greatest happiness is described in a dreary and spiritless way: "he went on, re-chewing his happiness, like those who after dinner taste again the truffles which they are digesting."

From his childhood in the countryside, tending turkeys and picking fruit in the hedges, he retains a predilection for open spaces and a claustrophobia which manifests itself in drowsiness or clumsiness. As a child, he falls asleep while listening to the priest's first lesson. Later, during "his time at school, when he remained shut up within the high walls", his awkwardness in the classroom earns him mockery from his classmates. A resident at the Rouen medical school, he dreams in front of the window, "and he expandeded his nostrils to breathe in the sweet odours of the country which did not reach him." When he takes his wife to the theatre in Rouen, he understands nothing about the opera and spills his drink. It is during one of his tours in the countryside that he meets Emma: in the first happy days of his marriage, he experiences peaceful enjoyment during his professional visits "with the sun on his back and the morning air in his nostrils, his heart full of the joys of the past night".

=== A doctor in search of respectability ===
Charles, pushed into medicine without much enthusiasm, fails his first exam and only succeeds in the second by dint of memory, learning all the answers by heart. He must be content with the modest rank of officier de santé (health officer), lower than that of medical doctor. He can only provide such basic care as pulling a tooth, bloodletting, or treating old Monsieur Rouault's fracture. He operates on an injured stable boy, but the treatment fails and he has to refer the patient to a real doctor who performs an amputation on him: Emma then loses all respect for Charles.

Charles lives at a time when a country doctor struggles to find his place in society. While a Parisian doctor can establish himself in a profitable specialism, publish books and advertise, a young practitioner in a small town like Yonville must be content with a routine activity, poorly paid when compared to the cost of his studies. Charles strives to gain the respect of his fellow citizens but, after some progress, he is discredited by his failed operation and it is not him but his rival, the pharmacist Homais, who obtains the Legion of Honour.

=== A family ruined ===
Madame Bovary, mother of Charles, had married with a comfortable dowry of 60,000 francs: her husband, idle and spendthrift, squandered it little by little and died without leaving any fortune. To protect Charles from want, his mother married him to a rich widow but she died shortly after. The mother several times warns her son against Emma's luxury tastes but he, blinded by the adoration he has for his wife, lets her waste as she pleases and even gives her power of attorney over his property, which is highly unusual at a time when in marriage law the husband is supposed to be the head of the family. Emma, pushed into spending by her successive lovers and by the merchant Lheureux who advances her credit at high interest through promissory notes, falls into over-indebtedness and surrenders the only property inherited from Charles's father, a property worth 4,000 francs. When Mme Bovary, the mother, tries to cut short her expenses by forcing her to burn the power of attorney, Charles, out of weakness, signs another one for her. When Emma dies, creditors finish devouring the family assets.

=== A sentimental failure ===
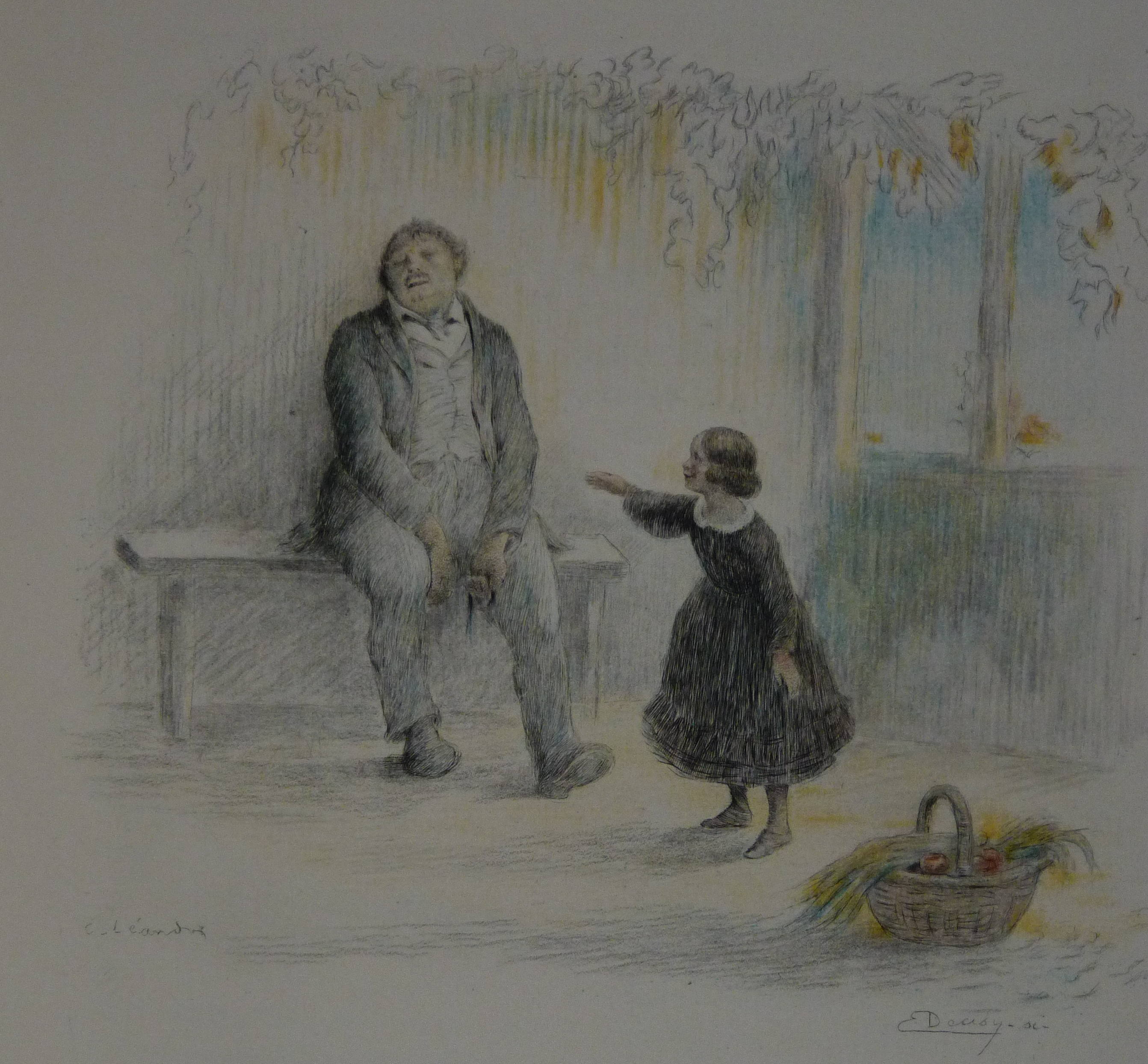
La mort de Charles Bovary by Charles Léandre, 1931.

Although he is described as a dull and withdrawn character throughout the novel, Charles feels unconditional love towards Emma: he gives her a carriage, worries about her health, takes her to the opera, pays for her music lessons. The birth of their daughter Berthe fills him with joy and it is above all he who takes care of the little girl. Unfortunately, Emma neglects her daughter and her husband to immerse herself in adultery with her two lovers and ruin the household with her costly elopement preparations. After his wife's suicide, Charles is devastated when he discovers in a drawer the letters which prove her affair with Léon: inconsolable for the loss of Emma, he lets himself die of grief, finally acquiring, too late, the status of romantic hero. After having remained locked up at home for a long time, neglecting his patients and his health, he comes out with a lock of his wife's hair in his hand and finds in death a fullness that he had lost since his childhood:

The next day Charles went to sit down on the seat in the arbour. Rays of light were straying through the trellis, the vine leaves threw their shadows on the sand, the jasmines perfumed the air, the heavens were blue, Spanish flies buzzed round the lilies in bloom, and Charles was suffocating like a youth beneath the vague love influences that filled his aching heart.

The death of Charles is a real social death for his little daughter: the bourgeois Homais forbids his children from associating with her "seeing the difference of their social position". Left destitute, taken in by a relative, she is reduced to factory work in a cotton mill.

== His supposed original ==
According to a widespread opinion in Normandy, Flaubert was inspired by an officier de santé from Rouen named Eugène Delamare. The latter, like Charles Bovary in the novel, had received a phrenological bust as a gift. Delamare's wife, notoriously unfaithful, had died young on 6 March, 1848, and her husband had followed her to the grave a few months later. Furthermore, Eugène Delamare had been a student of the surgeon Achille Cléophas Flaubert, the novelist's father. Gustave Flaubert always denied any resemblance between the figures in his novel and real people, but the legend took root in local culture and people were shown pear trees "planted by Bovary" at Ry, the village where the Delamares lived. At the Bovary Museum in Ry, next to a gallery of automatons in period costume, are objects that belonged to Delamare presented as those of the Bovarys: among others, notarial deeds relating to a debt Delamare apparently contracted with Gustave Flaubert.

== His name ==
The name Bovary has been held to come from bovin "bovine", bœuf "ox" which reflects Charles' bovine placidity, further accentuated in his schoolboy nickname, "Charbovari" which evokes the bœuf charolais "Charolais beef"; at the same time, this nickname evokes the charivari, a farcical uproar that was celebrated to mock ridiculous characters or cuckolds. Further theories as to the origin of Bovary's surname abound. It has been pointed out that when Flaubert was 24 a certain M. Loursel was tried in Rouen on a charge of murdering his wife and children so as to be able to marry his lover, Esther de Bovery. The trial, and especially Esther de Bovery, were the subject of much comment at the time. Again, the Bovary surname might have been taken from a remote ancestor of Flaubert's called Anne de Boveri; from a M. Bovary who was the orchestral conductor of the Rouen theatre (which figures in the novel); from a Rouen tobacconist, known to Flaubert, called Madame Bouvard, in combination with the name of the village of Ry; or from the M. Bouvaret who kept a Cairo hotel at which Flaubert had stayed. This last theory was espoused by Flaubert himself, writing in 1870, though the novelist Mario Vargas Llosa cautions against too readily accepting this claim, noting that "as regards his sources, an author generally knows less th[a]n his critics".
