= Jeannette Scott =

American painter

- Born: 1864; Kincardine, Canada West
- Died: 1937 (aged 72–73); Skaneateles, New York, U.S.
- Known for: Painting, Educator

Jeannette Scott (1864–1937) was a Canadian-born American painter. She became the head of the painting department at Syracuse University.

== Biography ==
Scott was born in 1864 in Kincardine, Canada West. Upon the death of her father, when she was twenty-one, she moved to the United States where she studied at the Philadelphia School of Design for Women, there her professors included Emily Sartain. She also studied at the Pennsylvania Academy of the Fine Arts.

From 1889 to 1894, Scott studied in Paris at the Académie Julian and the Académie Colarossi. Her teachers in Paris included Joseph Blanc, Gustave-Claude-Etienne Courtois, and Alphonse Mucha.

Scott exhibited her work at the Palace of Fine Arts at the 1893 World's Columbian Exposition in Chicago, Illinois. Scott also exhibited her art the Boston Art Club and the National Academy of Design in New York. Scott was a member of the American Federation of Arts. She also worked with the Inter-American Commission of Women.

In 1895, Scott became a professor of painting in the College of Fine Arts at Syracuse University. In 1902 she became head of the painting department, teaching there until 1927, when she retired.

Scott died in 1937 in Skaneateles, New York.

== Gallery ==
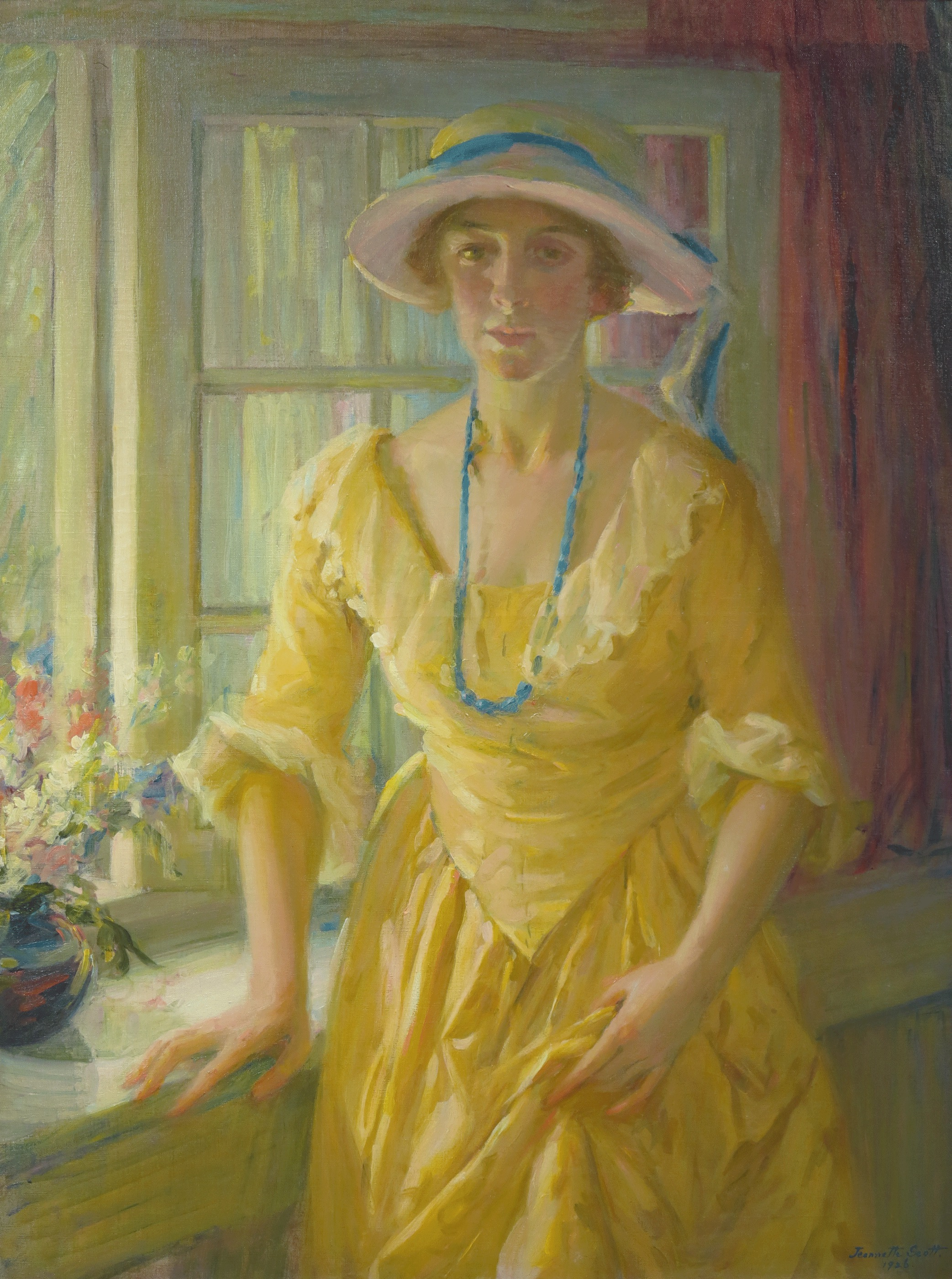
The Apartment Window by Jeannette Scott, 1926

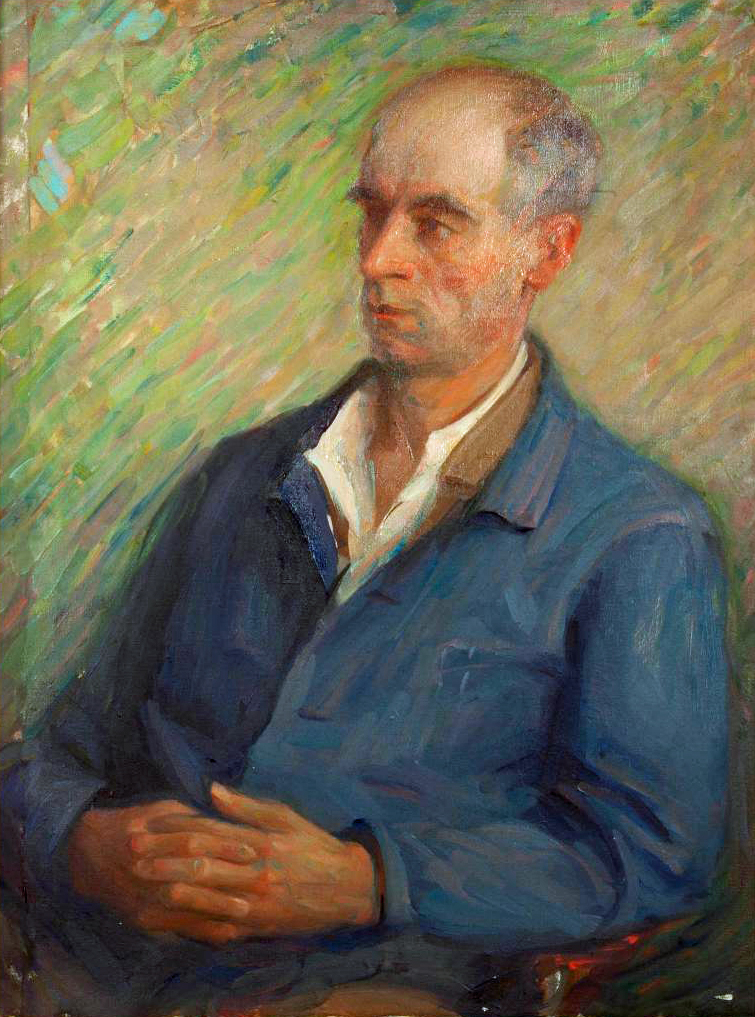
Portrait of a Man by Jeannette Scott
