= Aurelianus (Gallo-Roman) =

Gallo-Roman statesman

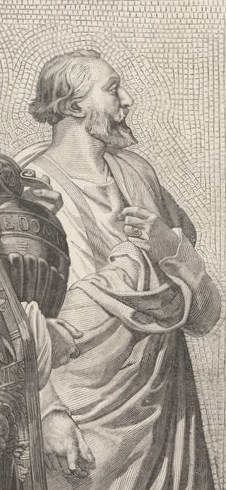
Nineteenth-century depiction of Aurelianus with the facial features of Léon Gambetta

Aurelianus was a Gallo-Roman statesman, commander and magnate in the late 5th-century Gaul. He was also a duke of Melun, but most importantly, the chief advisor of Clovis I.

After the defeat Syagrius in 486 at the Battle of Soissons, Aurelianus defected to the side of Clovis and aided him in the stabilisation of the domain.

In 493, Clovis sent him on a secret mission to arrange a marriage with a Burgundian princess, Clotilde. At night, while pretending to be a pilgrim, Clotilde welcomed him. While washing his feet, Aurelianus revealed the identity of her suitor and delivered her a ring of Clovis.

During the Battle of Tolbiac Aurelianus urged Clovis to convert to Christianity. Eventually Clovis gifted Melun to Aurelianus.

== Biography ==
Known only by a cognomen common in Roman Gaul, Aurelianus is mentioned in the Historia Francorum written by Gregory of Tours, although this may be another person of the same name. The anecdotes concerning Aurelianus are mainly the product of later second-hand works of the 7th century, such as the Liber, Liber Historiae Francorum and Historia Francorum epitomata, written by Fredegar, but also of the 9th century, like the work of Hincmar, Vita Remigii. He was first regarded as a real historical figure towards the end of the 19th century by Godefroid Kurth. More recently, the medieval history specialist Laurent Theis does not rule out the historicity of Aurelianus, although he states that the 'loyal Aurelianus' may be an archetype of the wise Roman Christian, like Aredius, advisor of the Burgundian king Gundobad. An Aurelianus, vir illustris is noted among the correspondents of Avitus of Vienne, but Martin Heinzelmann, contrary to what is written in the PLRE, states that this Aurelianus is another person of the same name.

According to the Liber historiæ and Fredegar, Clovis used Aurelianus as an intermediary to secretly arrange his marriage with Clotilde. The details of the secret meeting between Clotilde and Aurelianus, according to which he was disguised as a pilgrim, is more likely to be a myth than a historical fact. He was present at the Battle of Tolbiac, where he advised Clovis to put his faith in the God of Clotilde and convert to Christianity.

Again according to the Liber historiæ, Clovis rewarded Aurelianus for his services by giving him the title of Duke of Melun. This, according to Kurth, is a confusion with another person of the same name.

Some late speculations considered Aurelianus to be a native of Orléans, as Aurelianum was the Roman name of the city. In the 19th century, Nicolas-Claude-Joseph Godelle suggested that the name of Arlaines, a hamlet of the commune of Ressons-le-Long where ruins were discovered in 1810, could come from an Aureliana villa, belonging to Aurelianus, making him a native of Soissons. This etymological hypothesis, however, is not supported by any findings or documents, the archeological excavation establishing that it was a Roman camp of the 1st century.

Aurelianus, consiliarus regis, is among the signatories of Clovis's charter establishing the Abbey of Saint-Pierre-le-Vif. However, the document – purportedly from 504 – is a forgery created in the 10th or 11th century.

In a book published in the 16th century, Nicole Gilles describes Aurelianus as the Grand Chamberlain of the king, but this anachronism is corrected in 1623 by Pierre Bardin. A few years after Bardin, Philippe Labbe also expressed doubts on whether Aurelianus was also Grand Chancellor and Keeper of the Seals, offices that were mis-attributed to him by earlier authors, who misinterpreted the ring Aurelianus gave to Clotilde as Clovis's seal.

== Depictions ==
Inspired by the Grandes Chroniques de France, two of the tapestries that were ordered in the 16th century by Robert de Lenoncourt, destined to be displayed in the Abbey of Saint-Remi, portray Aurelianus. One of them depicts his meeting with Clotilde and the other depicts him first at Tolbiac pressuring Clovis to convert by saying to him "Croy au dieu auquel croyt ta femme" (believe in the god in whom your wife believes), and then witnessing the baptism of Clovis in Reims. In this scene, Aurelianus is wearing a coat decorated with a fleur-de-lis pattern, inspired by the coronation ceremony which itself was inspired by the baptism of Clovis during the Middle Ages.

In the collegiate church of Notre-Dame des Andelys, a stained glass window depicts the meeting of Clotilde and Aurelianus.

The woodcut department of the Bibliothèque nationale de France possesses two engravings, made in a 16th- to 17th-century style, depicting "Aurelian, grand conseiller de Clovis et chancelier de France" (Aurelian, chief advisor of Clovis and chancellor of France). Portrayed with a long beard, Aurelianus holds a ring, a reference to the meeting with Clotilde. Another copy of the engraving is kept in Versailles.

In 1881, while decorating the Panthéon, Joseph Blanc painted Aurelianus in the central part of the Triomphe de Clovis (Triumph of Clovis), in which historical characters are represented with the traits of contemporaries of the artist. Aurelianus is depicted in this work with the traits of Léon Gambetta, then President of the National Assembly of France. Blanc may have chosen Gambetta due to his Italian origins.
