= The Apartment Window =

Painting by Jeannette Scott

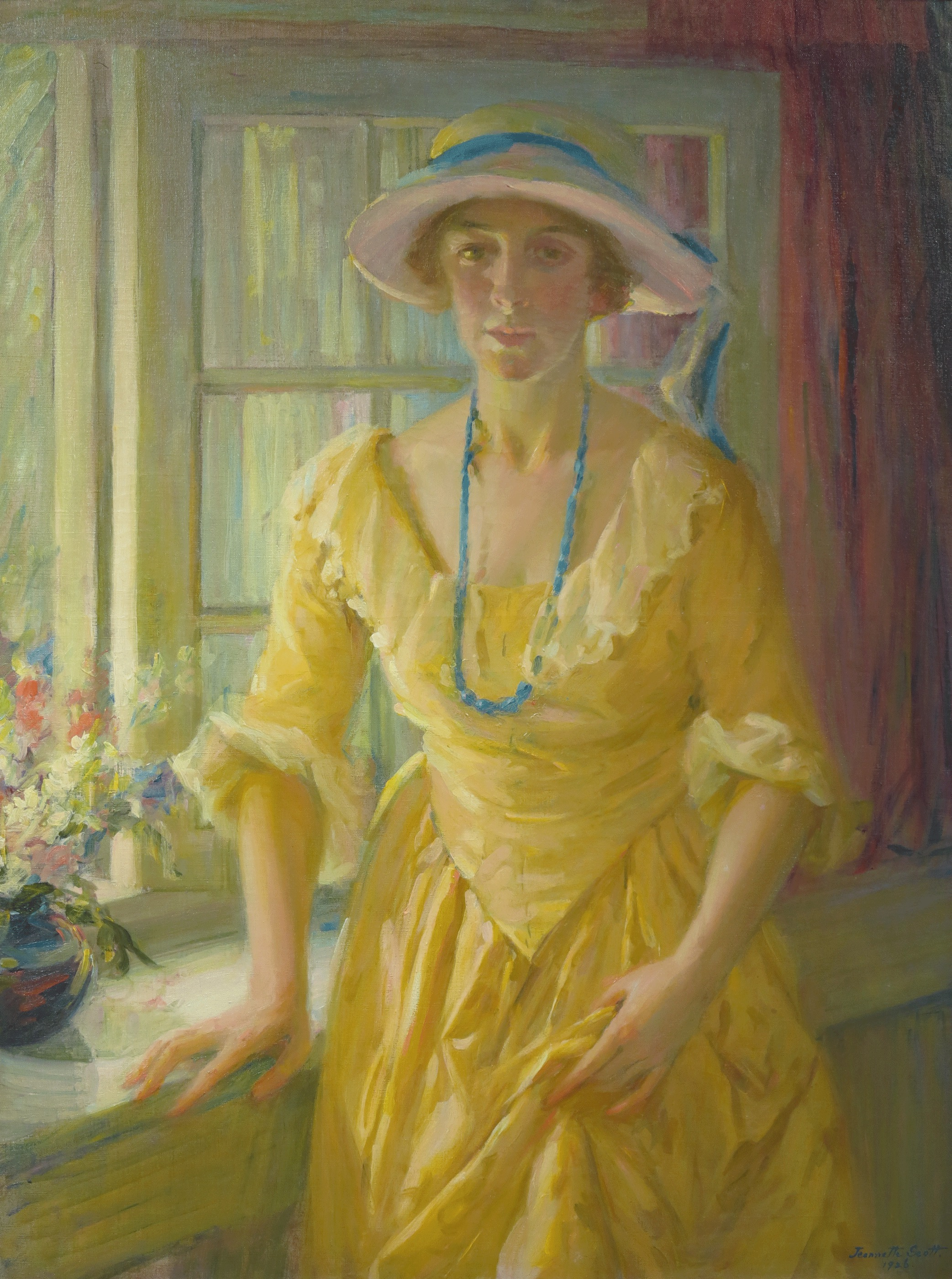
- Artist: Jeannette Scott
- Year: 1926
- Medium: Oil on canvas
- Dimensions: 40 cm × 30 cm (16 in × 12 in)
- Location: Vose Galleries; Boston

The Apartment Window is an early 20th century painting by American artist Jeannette Scott. Done in oil on canvas, the work depicts a hatted woman in a yellow dress set before a window. The painting is in the collection of Vose Galleries in Boston, Massachusetts.
