= Hôtel de Ville, Melun =

Town hall in Melun, France

Hôtel de Ville
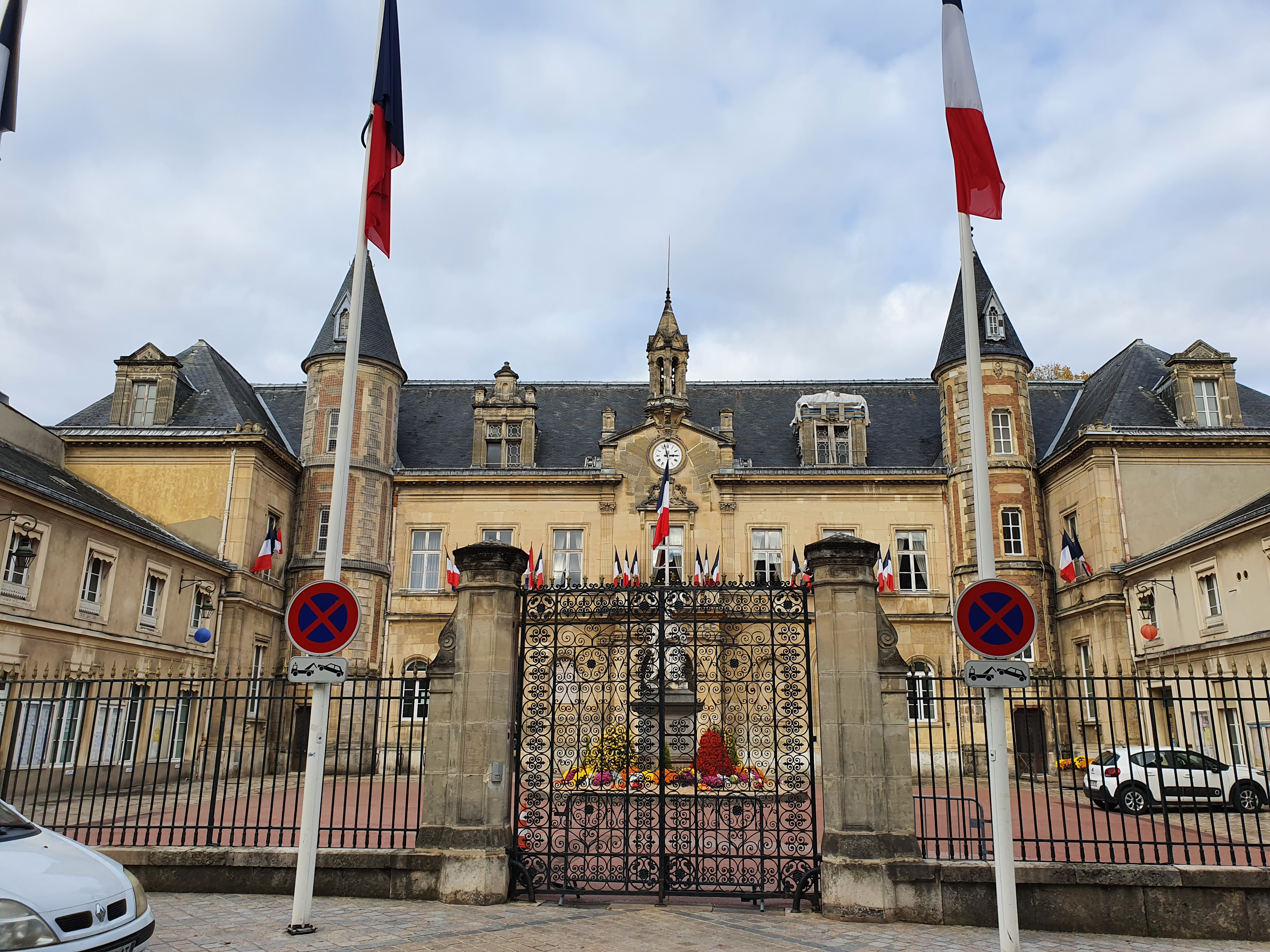
- The main frontage of the Hôtel de Ville in November 2021
- Interactive map of the Hôtel de Ville area

General information
- Type: City hall
- Architectural style: Neoclassical style
- Location: Melun, France
- Coordinates: 48.5399°N 2.6608°E
- Completed: 1848

Design and construction
- Architect: Jean-Jacques Gilson

The Hôtel de Ville (French pronunciation: [otɛl də vil], City Hall) is a municipal building in Melun, Seine-et-Marne, to the southeast of Paris, standing on Rue Paul Doumer.

== History ==
The first town hall in Melun was a building known as Hostel aux Bourgeois on Rue Neuve (now Rue Eugène Briais) which was established in the early 16th century. From 1748, after the first town hall became dilapidated, the consuls used rented offices, initially on Rue de la Juiverie (now Rue René Pouteau), and subsequently on Rue Auxoignons (later renamed Rue de l'Hôtel de Ville and now Rue Paul Doumer). In 1837, after finding this arrangement unsatisfactory, the town council decided to commission a dedicated town hall. The site they selected, on Rue de l'Hôtel de Ville, was occupied by two buildings, the Hôtel de Cens, and a factory manufacturing painted canvases, Koenig.

The Hôtel de Cens had been established as the tax office of the Abbey of Saint-Denis in the Middle Ages. It was acquired by a wealthy merchant, Jehan Regnault, in the late 15th century, and by the nuns of the Madeleine de Trainel in 1629. They nuns built a chapel there. It was then bought by Jean Riotte, who was an advisor to Louis XIV, in 1652. During the French Revolution, it served as a refuge for a nobleman, Charles Reynard Laure Félix de Choiseul, Duke of Praslin.

The council let the contract to start work on the site in November 1844. The Hôtel de Cens and the Koenig factory were largely demolished, although a turret on the right-hand side of the Hôtel de Cens was retained. The new building was designed by Jean-Jacques Gilson in the neoclassical style, built in ashlar stone and was officially opened on 14 June 1848.

The new building was laid out as a typical hôtel particulier with a grand portal, a grand courtyard and two ornate façades. The turret from the Hôtel de Cens was remodelled to form a feature at the northeast corner of the courtyard, while a new turret was erected in the northwest corner of the courtyard to provide symmetry. The design involved a symmetrical main frontage, at the back of the courtyard, with the end bays projected forward as pavilions. The central bay featured a porch formed by Doric order columns supporting an entablature and a balustraded balcony. There was a French door, which was surmounted by a cornice and a coat of arms, on the first floor. The central bay was flanked by pilasters supporting an open pediment with a clock in the tympanum. At the apex of the pediment there was an octagonal lantern with a spire and a finial. The second and sixth bays contained round headed openings with moulded surrounds and keystones. The other bays were fenestrated by round headed windows on the ground floor and by casement windows with moulded surrounds on the first floor. There were two dormer windows at attic level. Internally, the principal room was the Salle du Conseil (council chamber).

A statue of the theologian, Jacques Amyot, who was born in the town, was created by the sculptor, Eugène Godin, and unveiled in the courtyard of the town hall in May 1860. In January 1882, the microbiologist, Louis Pasteur, used the courtyard of the town hall to announce the successful vaccination of fifty sheep at Pouilly-le-Fort Farm against anthrax.

On 24 August 1944, during the Second World War, American troops launched an artillery barrage against the German soldiers occupying the town. The town clerk, Albert Görge, fought to put out the fires, despite gunfire all around, and tried to contact the Americans. The town was eventually liberated the next day.

== Sources ==
- Förstel, Judith (2006). Melun. Une île, une ville. Patrimoine urbain de l'Antiquité à nos jours. Bulletin Monumental. pp. 87–88.
