= Battle of Tolbiac =

Conflict dispute between the Franks and the Alamanni

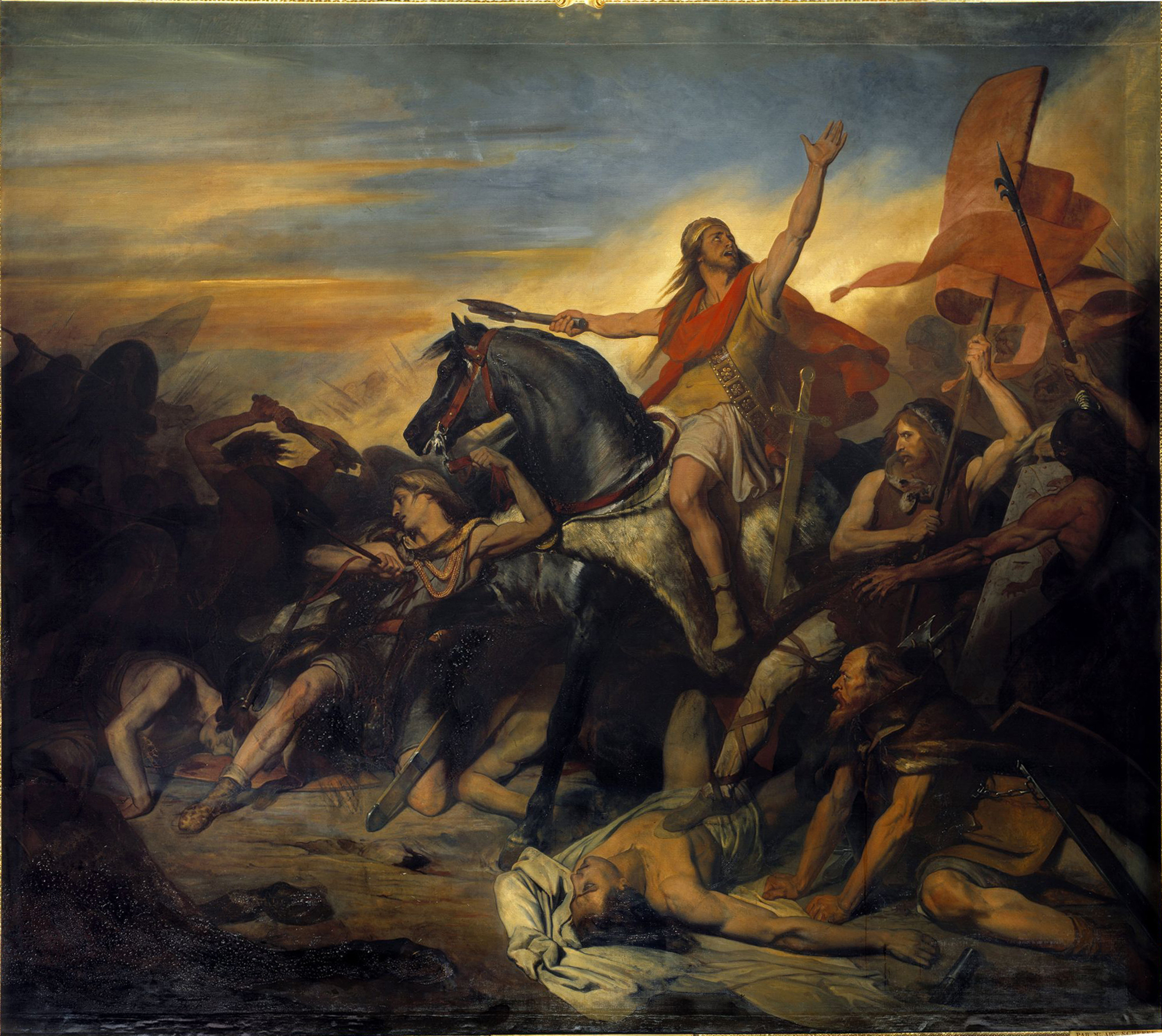
- The Battle of Tolbiac; Ary Scheffer, 1836
Date	c. 496 AD
Location	Zülpich, North Rhine-Westphalia 50°40′31″N 6°36′4″E
Result	Frankish victory: End of Alamannic autonomy

Belligerents
Franks	Alemanni

Commanders and leaders
Sigobert the Lame; Clovis I Aurelianus	Gibuld †

Strength
6,000 Franks	Unknown

Casualties and losses
Heavy	Heavy
- Location within Germany

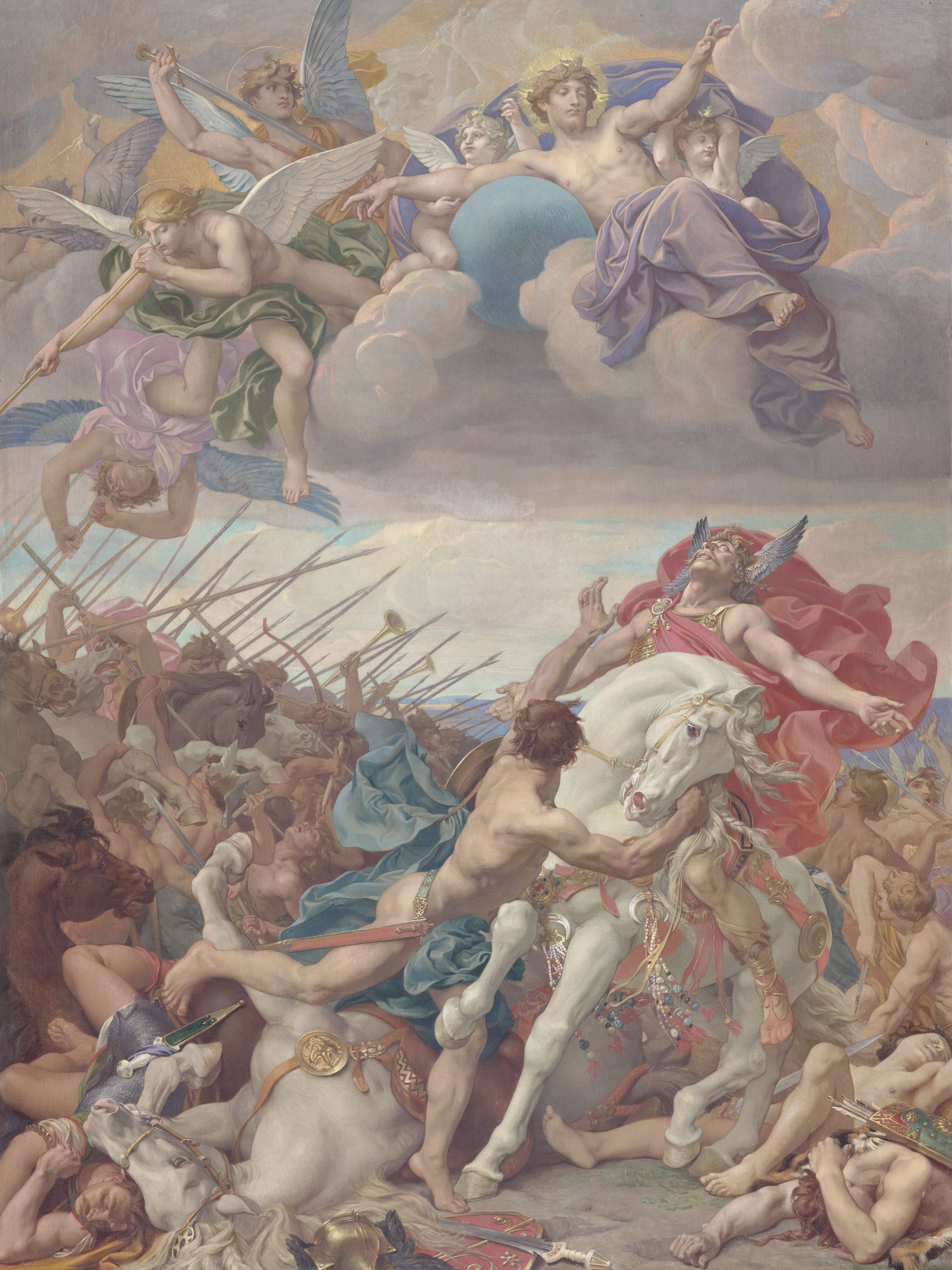
Battle of Tolbiac, fresco at the Panthéon, Paris by Joseph Blanc, c. 1881.

The Battle of Tolbiac was fought between the Franks, who were fighting under Clovis I, and the Alamanni, whose leader is not known. The date of the battle has traditionally been given as 496, though other accounts suggest it may either have been fought earlier, in the 480s or early 490s, or later, in 506. The site of "Tolbiac", or "Tolbiacum", is usually given as Zülpich, North Rhine-Westphalia, about 60 km east of what is now the German-Belgian frontier. The Franks were successful at Tolbiac and established their dominance over the Alamanni.

== Background ==
The Franks were two neighboring peoples, and allies: the Salian Franks, whose king was Clovis, and the Ripuarian Franks, whose capital was Cologne and whose king was Sigebert the Lame. Bordering on Sigebert's kingdom were the Alemanni, a confederation of Germanic tribes. Border incidents, looting, and punitive raids multiplied between the Alemanni and Ripuarian Franks, but in 496 Sigebert suffered a real invasion and called on Clovis for help. Clovis responded favorably to his ally and raised an army. It is generally accepted that in defending Tolbiac, Sigebert and his army suffered heavy losses. There may have been two battles of Tolbiac.

== Battle ==
Little is known about the battle, except that the Ripuarian Franks were probably of no help after the first battle. Clovis saw his warriors being killed and felt the battle was getting out of hand. Moved to tears, he called upon the God of his wife Clotilde, the God that she had preached to him since their marriage in 493, asking for his help.

Gregory of Tours records Clovis's prayer in chapter II of the History of the Franks: "O Jesus Christ, you who as Clotilde tells me are the son of the Living God, you who give succor to those who are in danger, and victory to those accorded who hope in Thee, I seek the glory of devotion with your assistance: If you give me victory over these enemies, and if I experience the miracles that the people committed to your name say they have had, I believe in you, and I will be baptized in your name. Indeed, I invoked my gods, and, as I am experiencing, they failed to help me, which makes me believe that they are endowed with no powers, that they do not come to the aid of those who serve. It's to you I cry now, I want to believe in you if only I may be saved from my opponents." At these words, the Alemanni began to flee, as their leader had been killed with an axe. The Franks subdued or killed the remaining Alemanni.

== Account by Gregory of Tours ==
Gregory of Tours was the first to have mentioned the element that has shaped subsequent interpretations of Tolbiac as climactic in European history: Clovis is said to have attributed his success to a vow that he had made: if he won, he would convert to the religion of the Christian God who had aided him. He became a Christian in a ceremony at Reims on Christmas 496. The traditional date of the battle of Tolbiac has been established to accord with this firmly attested baptismal date, by accepting Gregory's account. A surviving letter from Avitus of Vienne, congratulating Clovis on his baptism, makes no mention of the supposed recent battlefield conversion.

Historia Francorum ii.30-31 directly affirms a parallel Gregory establishes with the conversion of Constantine the Great before the Battle of Milvian Bridge:

At last a war arose with the Alamanni, in which he was driven by necessity to confess what before he had of his free will denied. It came about that as the two armies were fighting fiercely, there was much slaughter, and Clovis's army began to be in danger of destruction. He saw it and raised his eyes to heaven, and with remorse in his heart he burst into tears and cried: "Jesus Christ, whom Clotilde asserts to be the son of the Living God, who art said to give aid to those in distress, and to bestow victory on those who hope in thee, I beseech the glory of thy aid, with the vow that if thou wilt grant me victory over these enemies, and I shall know that power which she says that people dedicated in thy name have had from thee, I will believe in thee and be baptized in thy name. For I have invoked my own gods but, as I find, they have withdrawn from aiding me; and therefore I believe that they possess no power, since they do not help those who obey them. I now call upon thee, I desire to believe thee only let me be rescued from my adversaries." And when he said thus, the Alamanni turned their backs, and began to disperse in flight. And when they saw that their king was killed, they submitted to the dominion of Clovis, saying: "Let not the people perish further, we pray; we are yours now." And he stopped the fighting, and after encouraging his men, retired in peace and told the queen how he had had merit to win the victory by calling on the name of Christ. This happened in the fifteenth year of his reign. Then the queen asked saint Remi, bishop of Rheims, to summon Clovis secretly, urging him to introduce the king to the word of salvation. And the bishop sent for him secretly and began to urge him to believe in the true God, maker of heaven and earth, and to cease worshipping idols, which could help neither themselves nor any one else. But the king said: "I gladly hear you, most holy father; but there remains one thing: the people who follow me cannot endure to abandon their gods; but I shall go and speak to them according to your words." He met with his followers, but before he could speak the power of God anticipated him, and all the people cried out together: "O pious king, we reject our mortal gods, and we are ready to follow the immortal God whom Remi preaches." This was reported to the bishop, who was greatly rejoiced, and bade them get ready the baptismal font. The squares were shaded with tapestried canopies, the churches adorned with white curtains, the baptistery set in order, the aroma of incense spread, candles of fragrant odor burned brightly, and the whole shrine of the baptistery was filled with a divine fragrance: and the Lord gave such grace to those who stood by that they thought they were placed amid the odors of paradise. And the king was the first to ask to be baptized by the bishop. Another Constantine advanced to the baptismal font...

== Consequences ==
The Alemanni abandoned the Lower Rhine and left the Ripuarian Franks alone. Clovis, who profited only a little, allowed his ally to retain the territory. Clovis later relied on Sigebert's assistance during the conquest of the northern part of the Visigothic kingdom.

Another consequence was the conversion of Clovis to Catholicism as he was baptized by Bishop Remigius of Rheins, who wrote him a letter regarding his conversion. This brought him the support of neighbouring Christians, along with that of the influential clergy. In addition, it allowed Clovis to undertake conquests and crusades to Christianise his new territories or expunge Arianism, considered heretics by the clergy.

== Date ==
The traditional date of the battle in 496 was challenged by Augustine Van de Vyver, whose revised chronology placed the battle in 506. This was extensively debated and is followed in some modern accounts. The date of 506 also follows Gregory's chronology, which places the death of Clovis' father, Childeric I, around the same time as that of St. Perpetuus, who died in 491. Hence 15 years from 491 would be 506. Childeric's grave contained coins of Emperor Zeno, who died in 491, but none after.

== Battle of Strasbourg (506) ==
Battle of Strasbourg
- Part of Frankish expansion under Clovis I
Date	506 CE
Location	near Strasbourg (Alsace)
Result	Victory to the Franks. Flight of the remaining Alemanni to Rhaetia. Partial defeat of the northern Alemanni by Clovis I and alliance of the southern Alamanni with the king of the Ostrogoths, Theodoric the Great

Belligerents
Franks	Alamanni

Commanders and leaders
Clovis I	Unknown

Strength
Unknown	Unknown

Casualties and losses
Unknown	Unknown

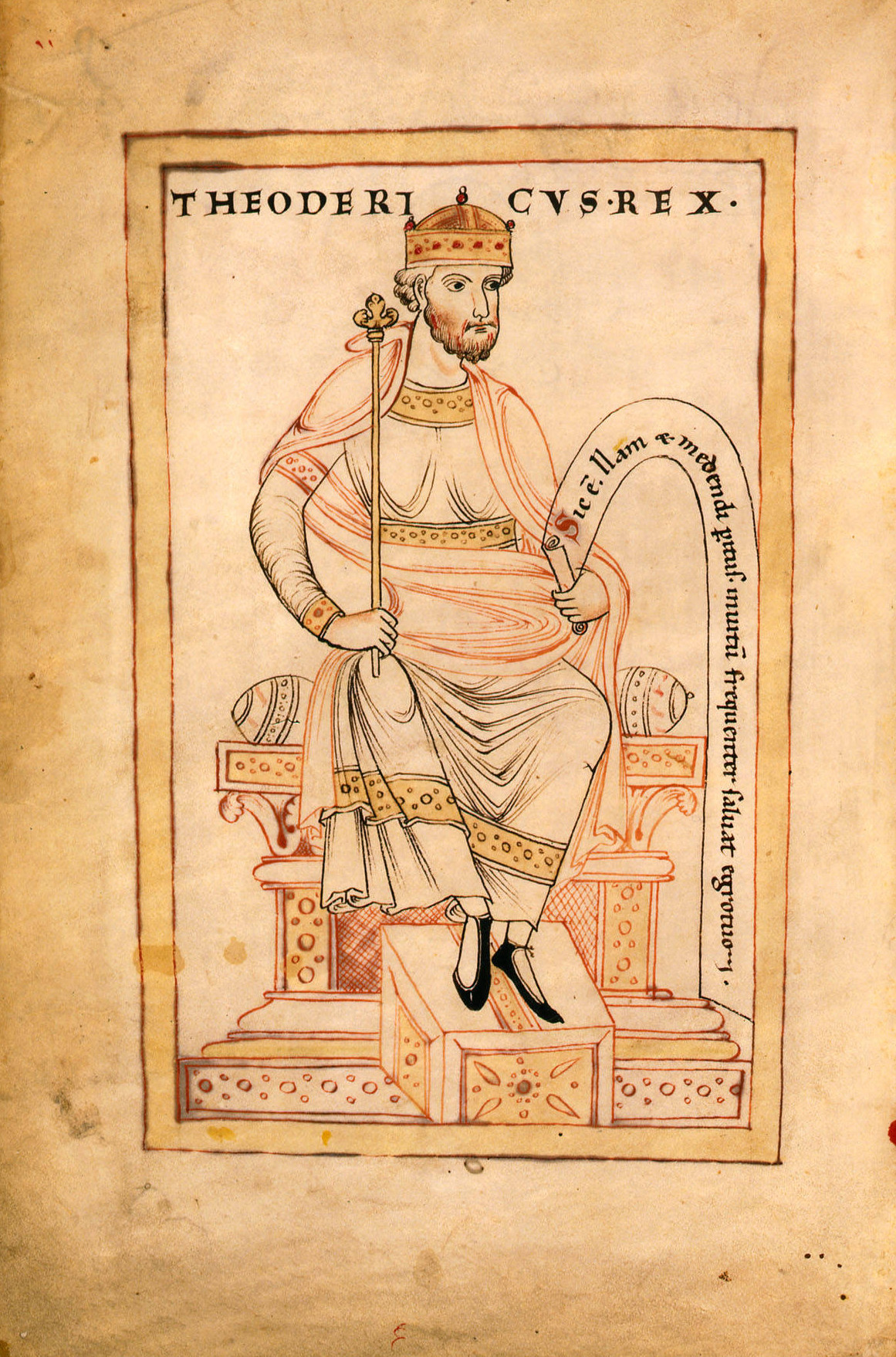
Theodoric the Great, king of the Ostrogoths, from a 12th-century German manuscript at Leiden University Library, Ms. vul. 46, dated 1176/77

The Battle of Strasbourg in 506 CE is a battle that several researchers have postulated was the third battle presumed to have taken place between the Alamanni and the Franks and which resulted in the defeat and incorporation of the northern Alamanni into the Frankish Empire, whilst the southern Alamanni placed themselves under the protection of the Ostrogothic king, Theodoric the Great.

=== Historical sources ===
The historical sources only make indirect references to a possible third battle between the Alamanni and the Franks. A letter by Theodoric the Great dating to 506/7 to the Merovingian king, Clovis I, speaks of battles in which Clovis had engaged the Alamanni. In this letter, Theodoric calls upon his brother-in-law to moderate his anger against the Alamanni, to punish only those who were disloyal and to cease from fighting the rest of the Alamanni. Theodoric placed the latter under his personal protection. A panegyric by Ennodius about Theodoric the Great speaks exaggeratedly of a victory by Theodoric over the Alamanni.

=== Historical background ===
At the Battle of Tolbiac in 496 CE the Alamanni suffered a severe defeat at the hands of Clovis. As a consequence, some of the Alamanni appear to have come under the protection of the Merovingians. From Theodoric's letter it may be assumed that these Alamanni subsequently broke their treaty with Clovis and for that reason they were persecuted and there were further battles between Clovis and the Alamanni. Several researchers believe that in 506 CE a third battle took place between the Alamanni and the Franks. What is certain is that between 496 and 506 there were further clashes. The location of the battle is not mentioned anywhere; that it was explicitly near Strasbourg, remains a theory held by a number of scholars. As a result of Clovis' victory, the northern half of the Alammanian lands went to the Franks while the southern half sought protection under Theoderic.

=== Outcome ===
==== Loss of territory ====
A consequence of losing the conflict between 496 and 506 against the Franks was that the territory that had been settled by the northern Alamanni, probably up to the present dialect boundary between the Alemannic and South Franconian dialects, finally came under Frankish rule.

==== Escape to Theoderic ====
Some of the Alamanni apparently fled southwards to Rhaetia and placed themselves under the protection of the King of the Ostrogoths, Theoderic. He went to his brother-in-law, Clovis I and interceded for the Alamanni, but acknowledged the anger of Clovis as justified. He therefore asked for the leaders to be punished but recommended clemency in sentencing. Theoderic promised that he would see to it that the Alamanni, who were in Rhaetia, also remained peaceful. Between the lines, Theoderic made it clear that he would thereby lay claim to the disputed area of Rhaetia and would use the Alamanni as a means of exerting pressure against Clovis if he did not recognize his supremacy there.

== Bibliography ==
- Magnus Aurelius Cassiodorus, Senator, Variae epistolae (537), Theoderic's state papers. Editio princeps by M. Accurius (1533). English translations by Thomas Hodgkin The Letters of Cassiodorus (1886); S.J.B. Barnish Cassiodorus: Variae (Liverpool: University Press, 1992) ISBN 0-85323-436-1
- Julius Cramer, Die Geschichte der Alamannen als Gaugeschichte, Breslau: M&H Marcus, 1899.
- Eugen Ewig. Die Merowinger und das Frankenreich, 5th updated edition, Stuttgart: Kohlhammer Verlag, 2006.
- Michael Fertig, Ennodius und seine Zeit, 1855-1860.
- Geuenich, Dieter. "Chlodwigs Alemannenschlacht(en) und Taufe", pp. 423–37. In D. Geuenich, ed., Die Franken und die Alemannen bis zur "Schlacht bei Zülpich" (496/497). Berlin: de Gruyter, 1998. ISBN 3-11-015826-4.
- Hoops, Johannes. Reallexikon der Germanischen Altertumskunde, Vol. 9, Berlin: de Gruyter, 1995. ISBN 3-11-014642-8.
- Hessisches Jahrbuch für Landesgeschichte, Volumes 44-45, State of Hesse: 1994.
- Karl J. Trübner, Grundriss der germanischen Philologie, Volume 3, Part 4, Hermann Paul: 1900.
- Ian Wood (ed.), Franks and Alamanni in the Merovingian Period: An Ethnographic Perspective, Woodbridge: Boydell, 1988.
- André van de Vyver, "La victoire contre les Alamans et la conversion de Clovis", Revue belge de philologie et d'histoire, Vol. 15, No. 3 (1936), pp. 859–914.
- André van de Vyver, "La victoire contre les Alamans et la conversion de CIovis (suite)", Revue belge de philologie et d'histoire, Vol. 16, No. 1 (1937), pp. 35–94.
- André van de Vyver, "L'unique victoire contre les Alamans et la conversion de Clovis en 506", Revue belge de philologie et d'histoire, Vol. 17, No. 3 (1938), pp. 793–813.
