= Khamis Digol =

Central African Republic footballer (born 1998)

Personal information
- Full name: Khamis Digol N'Dozangue
- Date of birth: 28 September 1998 (age 28)
- Place of birth: Melun, France
- Height: 1.81 m (5 ft 11 in)
- Positions: Right-back; centre-back

Team information
- Current team: Aubagne
- Number: 12

Youth career
- 2010–2011: Sénart-Moissy
- 2011–2013: CS Brétigny
- 2013–2016: Auxerre

Senior career*
| Years | Team | Apps | (Gls) |
| 2015–2017 | Auxerre B | 6 | (0) |
| 2016 | Auxerre | 2 | (0) |
| 2017–2020 | Troyes B | 17 | (1) |
| 2021–2022 | Olympique Marcquois | 12 | (1) |
| 2022– | Aubagne | 9 | (0) |

International career^{‡}
| 2021– | Central African Republic | 1 | (0) |
- * Club domestic league appearances and goals as of 20:10, 14 September 2019 (UTC) ‡ National team caps and goals as of 22:19, 8 June 2021 (UTC)

Khamis Digol N'Dozangue (born 28 September 1998) is a professional footballer who plays as a rightback for Aubagne. Born in France, he plays for the Central African Republic national team.

== Professional career ==
Digol made his professional debut with AJ Auxerre in a 0–0 Ligue 2 tie with US Orléans on 26 August 2016.

== International career ==
Born in France, Digol is of Central African Republic and Algerian descent. He was called up to represent the Central African Republic for a set of friendlies in June 2021. He debuted with the Central African Republic in a friendly 5–0 loss to Rwanda on 8 June 2021.
