= Émile Bin =

French painter

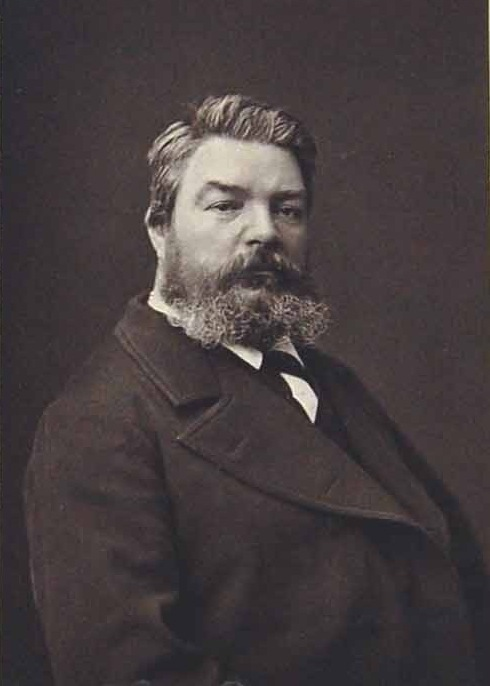
Émile Bin (1879). Photograph by Ferdinand Mulnier

Émile Jean-Baptiste Philippe Bin (10 February 1825 – 4 September 1897) was a French portraitist, mythology painter, watercolorist and politician.

== Biography ==
He was born in Paris. His father, the painter Jean-Baptiste François Bin (c.1791-1849), often known as "Bin père," gave him his first art instruction. From the ages of twelve to fifteen, he studied with his uncle, Nicolas Gosse. He then worked briefly with Léon Cogniet and entered the École des Beaux-arts in 1842. Three years later, he had his first exhibit at the Salon.

As a staunch Republican, he fought on the barricades in 1848 and 1851. Later, he would refuse to paint a portrait of Napoleon III for the Town Hall of Montmartre, despite needing the money to support his family.

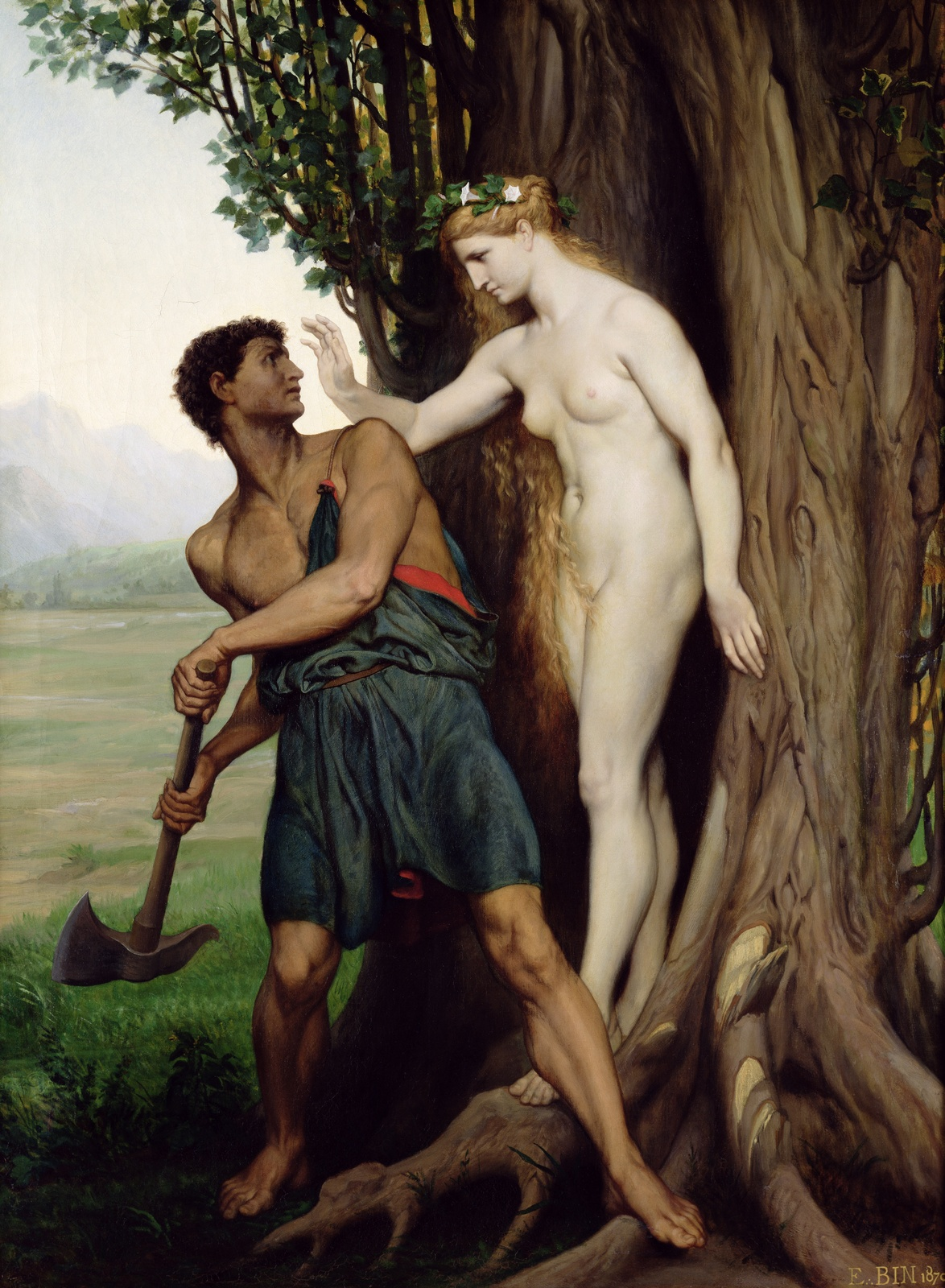
The Hamadryad (1870)

=== Decorative painting ===
He initially worked as a decorative painter, specializing in hotels throughout Paris and Reims (including the great hall of the Hôtel du Louvre, which he did together with his uncle), but also worked at the National Museum of Natural History, the École Supérieure de Pharmacie, the Crédit Mobilier, the Church of Saint-Sulpice and some private residences such as the Louis XV Salon of André Adolphe Eugène Disdéri. At the International Exposition (1867), he collaborated on decorating the Egyptian Pavilion, designed by Jacques Drevet, for which he was awarded the Order of the Medjidie. In 1871, he received three commissions from Russia. He was a fervent admirer of the works of Michelangelo and Raphael, and visited Rome in 1866, accompanied by his star pupil and sometime collaborator, Joseph Blanc, reinforcing his interest in historical and anecdotal scenes and his predilection for mythological nudes.

During the Siege of Paris in 1870, he was appointed to the Council of Armaments and Supplies, but refused to take part in the Commune and retired to Argentan. He remained anticlerical and close to the extreme radical left.

He was named a Knight of the Légion d'honneur in 1878. Two years later, he was one of the founders of the Société des Artistes Français and, the following year, the Salon des Artistes Français. Among his best-known students were Charles Léandre, Paul Milliet, Henri Rivière and Paul Signac.

=== Political affairs ===
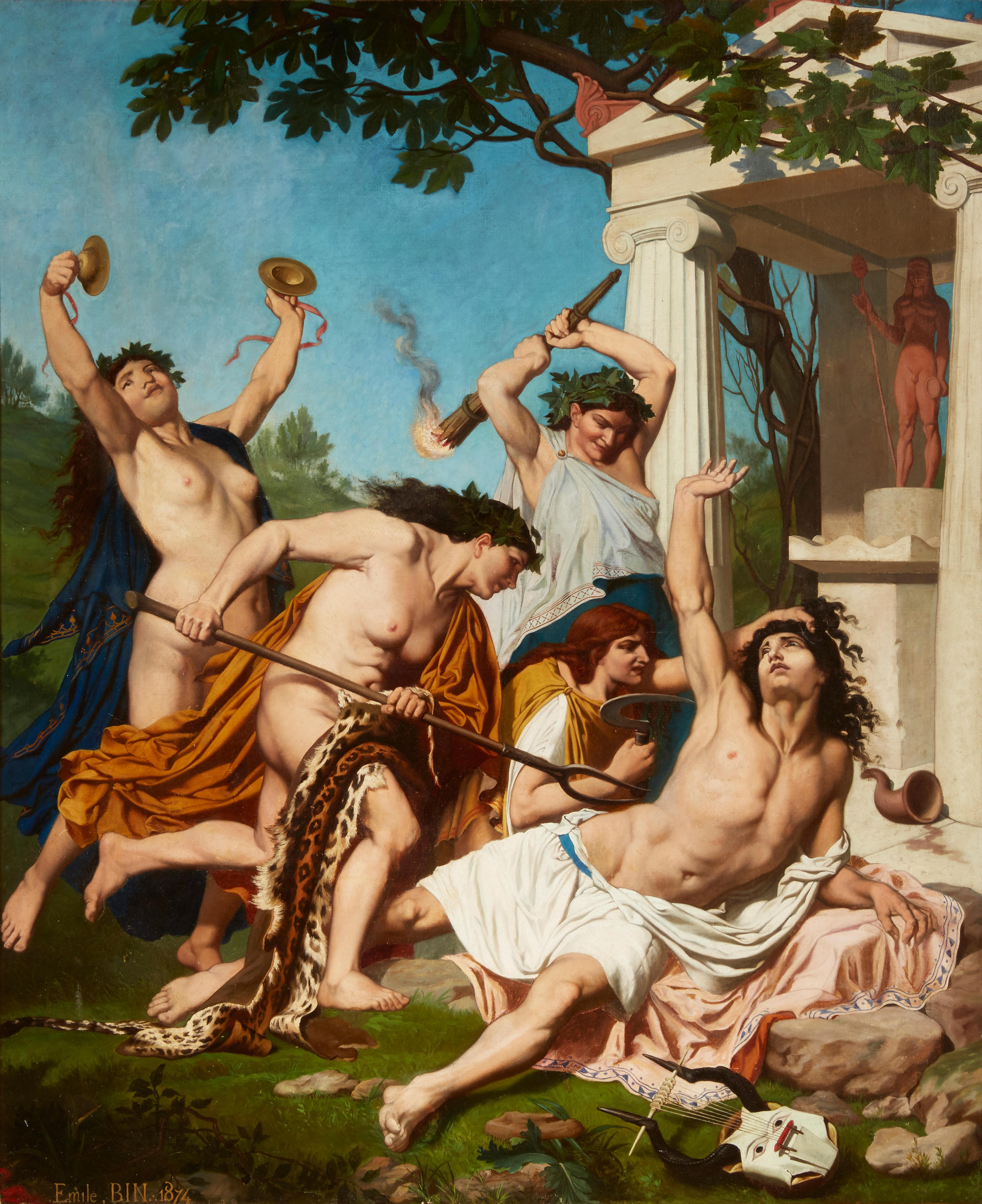
The Death of Orpheus (1874)

In 1883, he became Mayor of the Eighteenth Arrondissement. Six years later, he was relieved of his duties by Ernest Constans, the Minister of the Interior, on accusations of "Boulangism", perhaps due to his portrait of General Boulanger that had been exhibited at the Salon in 1888. Bin himself believed that it was all due to political manipulation by the socialist, Jules Joffrin, who was running against Boulanger in the Legislative Elections

That same year, to mark the centenary of the French Revolution, he executed a twenty-canvas historical diorama in the Parc des Buttes Chaumont, covering events from the Storming of the Bastille to the departure of Léon Gambetta during the Siege.

Bin died on 4 September 1897 in Marly-la-Ville.
