= Melun =

- Prefecture and commune
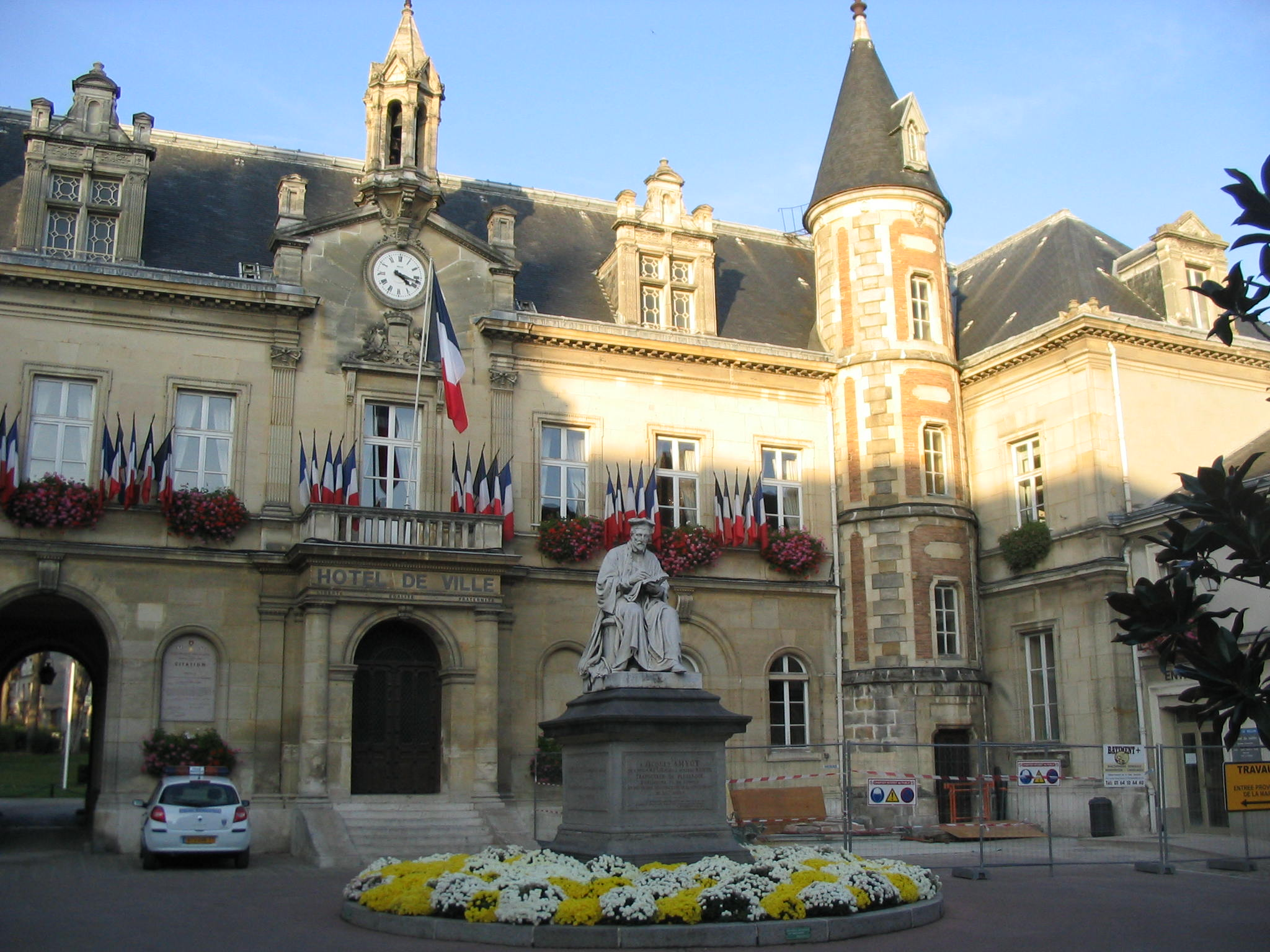
- The Hôtel de Ville

- Coat of arms

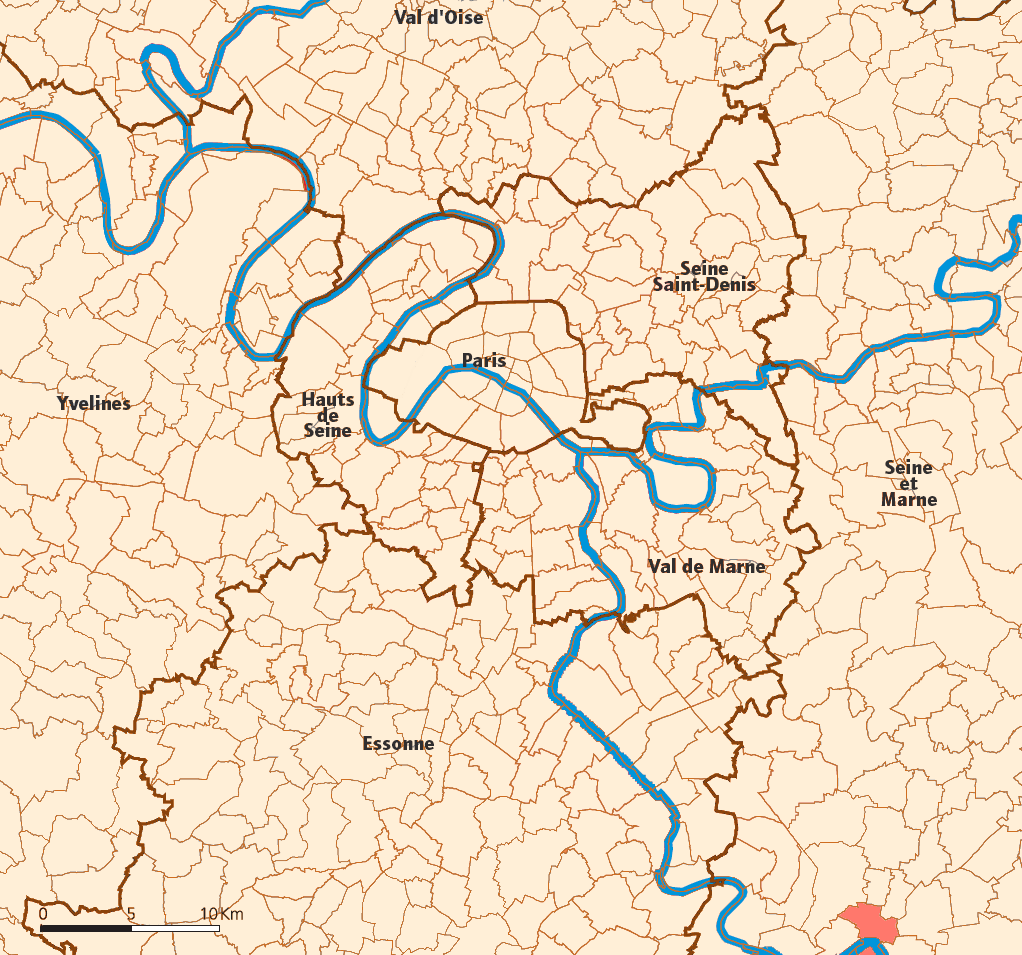
- Location (in red) within Paris inner and outer suburbs
- Location of Melun
- Location within France Location within Île-de-France (region)
- Coordinates: 48°32′26″N 2°39′36″E
- Country: France
- Region: Île-de-France
- Department: Seine-et-Marne
- Arrondissement: Melun
- Canton: Melun
- Intercommunality: CA Melun Val de Seine

Government
  - Mayor (2023–2026): Kadir Mebarek (Horizons)
- Area^{1}: 8.04 km^{2} (3.10 sq mi)
- Elevation: 54 m (177 ft)
- Highest elevation: 102 m (335 ft)
- Lowest elevation: 37 m (121 ft)
- Population (2023): 45,995
  - Density: 5,720/km^{2} (14,800/sq mi)
- Time zone: UTC+01:00 (CET)
  - Summer (DST): UTC+02:00 (CEST)
- INSEE/Postal code: 77288 /77000
- ^{1} French Land Register data, which excludes lakes, ponds, glaciers > 1 km^{2} (0.386 sq mi or 247 acres) and river estuaries.

Melun (French pronunciation: [məlœ̃]) is a commune in the Seine-et-Marne department in the Île-de-France region, north-central France. It is located on the southeastern outskirts of Paris, about 41 kilometres (25 1/2 miles) from the centre of the capital. Melun is the prefecture of Seine-et-Marne, and the seat of one of its arrondissements. Its inhabitants are called Melunais.

== History ==
Meledunum began as a Gaulish town; Caesar noted Melun as "a town of the Senones, situated on an island in the Seine"; at the island there was a wooden bridge, which his men repaired. Roman Meledunum was a mutatio where fresh horses were kept available for official couriers on the Roman road south-southeast of Paris, where it forded the Seine. Around 500 A.D, Clovis I granted Melun to a Gallo-Roman magnate, Aurelianus, who had fought for Clovis several times and apparently influenced his conversion to Christianity.

The Normans sacked it in 845. The castle of Melun became a royal residence of the Capetian kings. Hugh Capet (See also: House of Capet) gave Melun to Bouchard, his favorite. In the reign of Hugh's son, Robert II of France, Eudes, the count of Champagne, bought the city, but the king took it back for Bouchard in 999. The chatelain Gautier and his wife, who had sold the city, were hanged; Eudes escaped. Robert died there in July 1031.

Robert of Melun (c. 1100 – 27 February 1167) was an English scholastic Christian theologian who taught in France, and later became Bishop of Hereford in England. He studied under Peter Abelard in Paris before teaching there and at Melun, which gave him his surname.

In July 1415, Melun was besieged by King Henry V of England, who had recently signed the Treaty of Troyes with King Charles VI of France. The town was in the hands of the Dauphin, later Charles VII of France, who had been dispossessed by the treaty. The defenders were led by Arnaud Guillaume, seigneur de Barbazan, and fought off the besiegers for fourteen weeks before capitulating. The town was liberated by Joan of Arc on 17 April 1430.

The Hôtel de Ville was completed in 1848.

=== Counts of Melun ===
- Aurelianus (c. 500)
- Donatus (?-834)
- Bouchard I (956/967–1005), also Count of Vendôme and Count of Paris

=== Viscounts of Melun ===
The early viscounts of Melun were listed by 17th and 18th century genealogists, notably Père Anselme. Based on closer reading of the original documents, Adolphe Duchalais constructed this list of viscounts in 1844:

- Salo (c. 993; possibly legendary)
- Joscelin I (c. 998)
- William (possibly c. 1000)
- Ursio (c. 1067–1085)
- William the Carpenter (c. 1094)
- Hilduin, Garin, Ursio II, Jean (unknown dates, possibly not viscounts)
- Adam (c. 1138–1141; married Mahaut, daughter of his predecessor)
- Joscelin II (c. 1156)

The title eventually became an honorary peerage. Such viscounts include Honoré Armand de Villars and Claude Louis Hector de Villars.

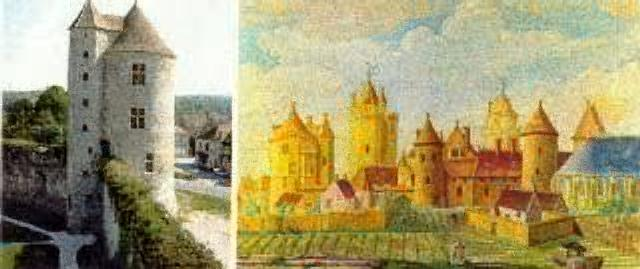
Watercolor postcard showing Melun in the 1920s and circa 1095.

== Population ==
Historical population

Year	Pop.	±% p.a.
1793	5,500	—
1800	6,111	+1.52%
1806	6,818	+1.84%
1821	6,992	+0.17%
1831	6,622	−0.54%
1836	6,846	+0.67%
1841	8,950	+5.51%
1846	9,151	+0.45%
1851	10,395	+2.58%
1856	10,312	−0.16%
1861	11,170	+1.61%
1866	11,408	+0.42%
1872	11,130	−0.41%
1876	11,241	+0.25%
1881	12,145	+1.56%
1886	12,564	+0.68%
1891	12,792	+0.36%
1896	13,641	+1.29%
1901	13,059	−0.87%

Year	Pop.	±% p.a.
1906	13,908	+1.27%
1911	14,861	+1.33%
1921	14,657	−0.14%
1926	15,928	+1.68%
1931	16,356	+0.53%
1936	17,499	+1.36%
1946	17,573	+0.04%
1954	20,219	+1.77%
1962	26,873	+3.62%
1968	34,518	+4.26%
1975	37,712	+1.27%
1982	35,005	−1.06%
1990	35,319	+0.11%
1999	35,695	+0.12%
2007	37,835	+0.73%
2012	40,503	+1.37%
2017	40,032	−0.23%
2023	45,995	+2.34%

Source: EHESS and INSEE (1968-2023)

== Climate ==
Climate data for Melun (1991–2020 normals, extremes 1947–present)
Month	Jan	Feb	Mar	Apr	May	Jun	Jul	Aug	Sep	Oct	Nov	Dec	Year
Record high °C (°F)	16.9 (62.4)	21.2 (70.2)	25.6 (78.1)	29.5 (85.1)	32.6 (90.7)	39.8 (103.6)	41.9 (107.4)	39.6 (103.3)	34.4 (93.9)	29.4 (84.9)	22.1 (71.8)	17.6 (63.7)	41.9 (107.4)
Mean daily maximum °C (°F)	6.9 (44.4)	8.3 (46.9)	12.5 (54.5)	16.2 (61.2)	19.7 (67.5)	23.0 (73.4)	25.6 (78.1)	25.5 (77.9)	21.4 (70.5)	16.3 (61.3)	10.6 (51.1)	7.3 (45.1)	16.1 (61.0)
Daily mean °C (°F)	4.2 (39.6)	4.9 (40.8)	7.9 (46.2)	10.8 (51.4)	14.3 (57.7)	17.5 (63.5)	19.8 (67.6)	19.6 (67.3)	16.0 (60.8)	12.2 (54.0)	7.6 (45.7)	4.7 (40.5)	11.6 (52.9)
Mean daily minimum °C (°F)	1.6 (34.9)	1.4 (34.5)	3.4 (38.1)	5.4 (41.7)	9.0 (48.2)	12.1 (53.8)	13.9 (57.0)	13.7 (56.7)	10.7 (51.3)	8.1 (46.6)	4.5 (40.1)	2.2 (36.0)	7.2 (45.0)
Record low °C (°F)	−19.8 (−3.6)	−19.7 (−3.5)	−10.3 (13.5)	−4.6 (23.7)	−2.1 (28.2)	1.6 (34.9)	4.0 (39.2)	3.5 (38.3)	0.4 (32.7)	−4.8 (23.4)	−9.3 (15.3)	−14.8 (5.4)	−19.8 (−3.6)
Average precipitation mm (inches)	50.9 (2.00)	46.0 (1.81)	46.6 (1.83)	48.8 (1.92)	61.9 (2.44)	58.1 (2.29)	59.4 (2.34)	54.2 (2.13)	54.0 (2.13)	58.5 (2.30)	56.3 (2.22)	63.2 (2.49)	657.9 (25.90)
Average precipitation days (≥ 1.0 mm)	10.7	9.8	9.1	9.0	9.8	8.9	7.7	7.9	7.9	9.5	10.6	11.7	112.6
Average relative humidity (%)	88	83	79	73	75	74	73	74	78	85	88	89	79.9
Mean monthly sunshine hours	59.5	82.9	142.9	188.2	216.3	226.1	234.7	225.3	180.4	118.5	68.4	54.4	1,797.5
Source 1: Meteociel
Source 2: Infoclimat.fr (humidity, 1961–1990)

== Transport ==
Melun Shield dating from the 15th century – "Melun (Seine-et-Marne): Azure on a semy-de-lys or a castle with three towers argent. Melun was one of the original strongholds of the royal domain. Motto: fida muris usque ad mures, recalling the siege of 1420 when inhabitants had to eat rats." http://www.heraldica.org/topics/france/frcitdep.htm

Melun is served by the Gare de Melun, which is an interchange station on Paris RER line D, on the Transilien R suburban rail line, and on several national rail lines.

== Main sights ==
The Collegiate Church of Notre-Dame, Melun was the original home of the Melun Diptych.

The nearby château of Vaux-le-Vicomte is considered a smaller predecessor of Palace of Versailles.

The officers' school of the French Gendarmerie is located in Melun.

== Notable people ==
Melun is the birthplace of:

- Jacques Amyot (1513–1593), writer
- Chimène Badi (1982–), singer
- Jérémie Bela (born 1993), footballer
- Samir Beloufa (1979–), professional footballer
- Willy Boly (born 1991), footballer
- Pierre Certon (c.1510-1520-1572), composer of Renaissance music (probably born in Melun)
- Morgan Ciprès (born 1991), pair skater
- Raphaël Desroses (born 1980), basketball player
- Jean-Baptiste Djebbari (born 1982), politician and former *Minister of Transport
- Khamis Digol (born 1998), footballer
- Stéphane Dondon (born 1977), basketball player
- Bertrand Grospellier (born 1981), poker player
- Grégory Guilvert (born 1982), racing driver
- Judah of Melun (13th century), French *rabbi and *tosafist
- Yvan Kibundu (born 1989), footballer
- Godson Kyeremeh (born 2000), footballer
- Edmé-François Mallet (1713–1755), theologian and *encyclopédiste
- Steven Mouyokolo (born 1987), footballer
- Granddi Ngoyi (born 1988), footballer
- Flavien Prat (born 1992), jockey
- Yrétha Silété (born 1994), figure skater
- Oumar Solet (born 2000), footballer
- William the Carpenter, viscount of Melun in the 11th century
- Werenoi (1994–2025), rapper of Cameroonian descent

== Education ==
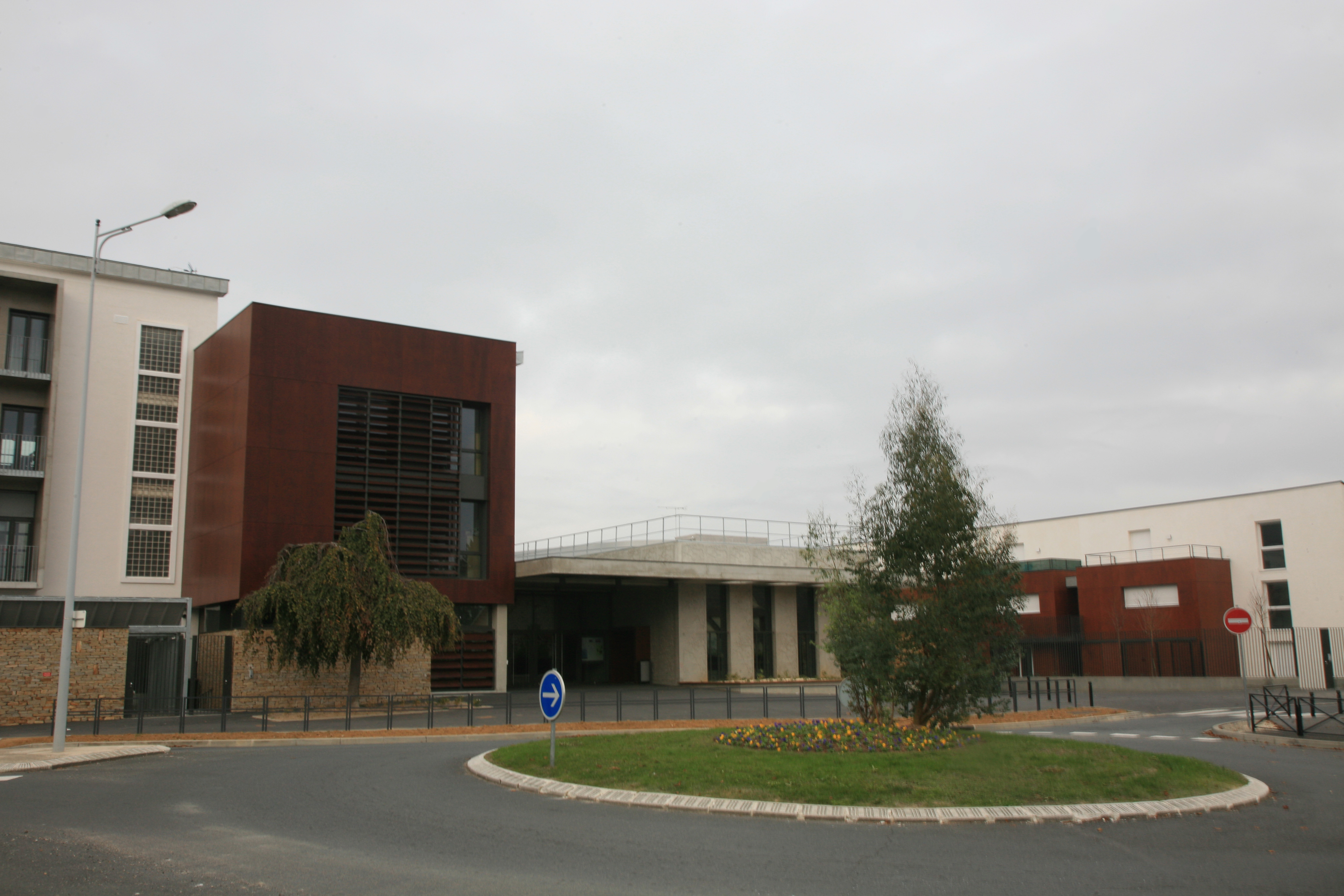
Lycée Jacques-Amyot

A campus of the École nationale de l'aviation civile (French civil aviation university) is located in Melun.

Public high schools/sixth form colleges:

- Lycée Léonard-de-Vinci
- Lycée Jacques-Amyot
- Lycée George-Sand

There is one private high school/sixth form college:

- Lycée Saint Aspais

== Twin towns – sister cities ==
Melun is twinned with:

- Crema, Italy
- Spelthorne, England, UK
- Stuttgart-Vaihingen, Germany

== See also ==
- Communes of the Seine-et-Marne department

== Sources ==
- Initial text from the "Carpenters' Encyclopedia of Carpenters 2001" Compiled by John R. Carpenter.
- The Viscounts and Counts of Melun are listed in Detlev Schwennicke, Europäische Stammtafeln, Neue Folge, Volume VII, Tafels 55 & 56.
