= Charles Lucien Léandre =

French painter (1862–1934)

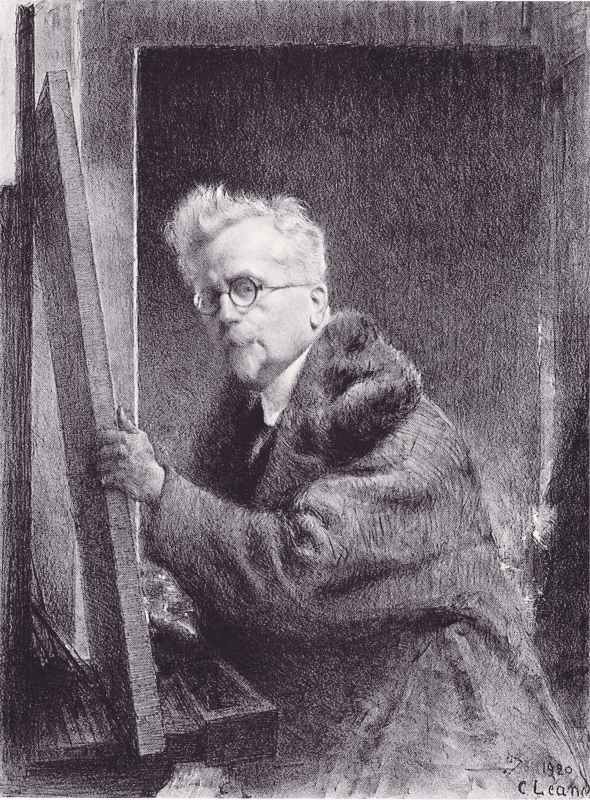
- Self-portrait, 1920
- Born: 23 July 1862; Champsecret, France
- Died: 24 May 1934 (aged 71); Montmartre, Paris, France
- Education: Beaux-Arts de Paris
- Occupation: Artist

Charles Lucien Léandre (French pronunciation: [ʃaʁl(ə) lysjɛ̃ leɑ̃dʁ]; 23 July 1862 – 24 May 1934) was a French caricaturist and painter. He studied painting under Émile Bin and Alexandre Cabanel.

== Early life ==
Charles Lucien Léandre was born on 23 July 1862 in Champsecret, Orne. His father was the mayor of the town in which they lived until his death in 1868. At 16, Léandre met the painter Émile Bin, who would instruct Léandre. Léandre received multiple awards for his artistic talents in his twenties.

== Work and career ==
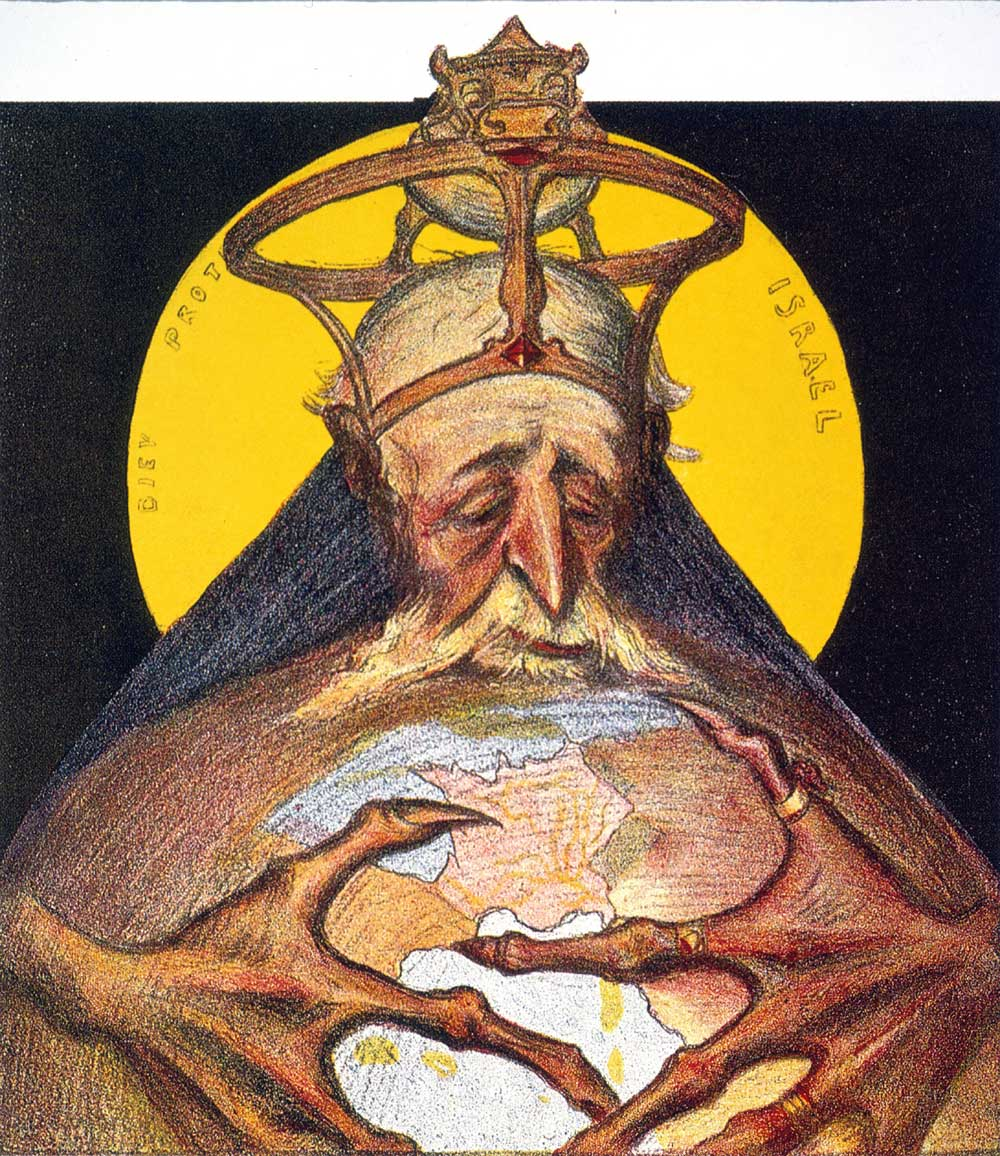
Antisemitic caricature of the Rothschild family by Charles Léandre, published as the cover of Le Rire

From 1887 Léandre figured among the exhibitors of the Salon, where he showed numerous portraits and genre pictures, but his popular fame is due to his comic drawings and caricatures. The series of the "Gotha des souverains," published in Le Rire, and Léandre's other work like that seen in L'Assiette au Beurre placed him in the front rank of contemporary caricaturists.

Besides his contributions to Le Rire, Le Figaro and other comic journals, he published a series of albums: Nocturnes, Le Musée des souverains, and Paris et la province. In 1904, he created the Société des Peintres Humoristes.

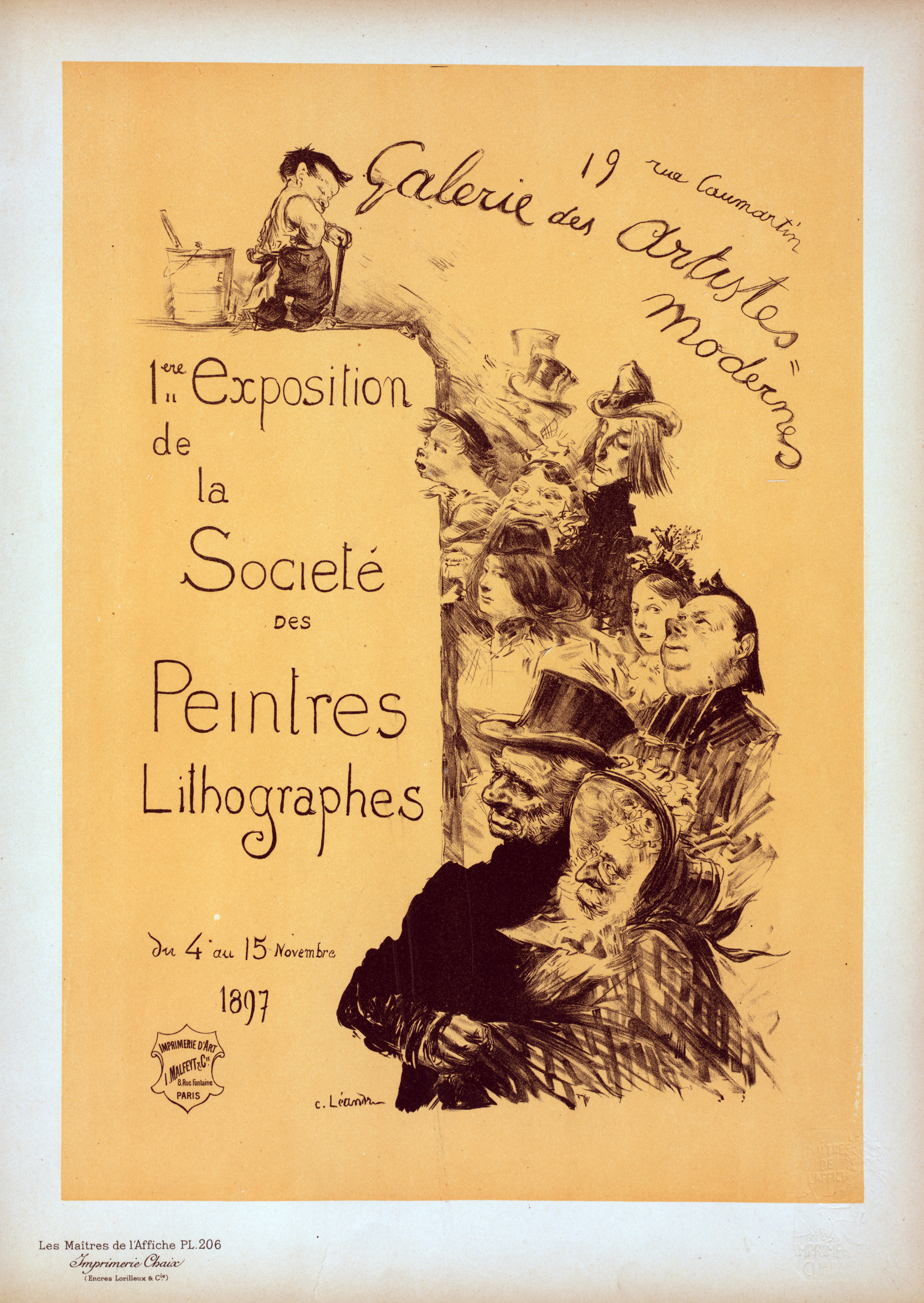
Poster 206 in Les Maîtres de l'Affiche

Léandre produced work in lithography, and designed many posters, such as the "Yvette Guilbert." "Les nouveaux mariés," "Joseph Prudhomme," "Les Lutteurs," and "La Femme au chien."

He died in 1934 in his Caulaincourt street studio, in Montmartre.

== Honours ==
Léandre won a bronze medal at the Exposition Universelle in 1889 for a large size painting: la Mère ou « Dormio cor meum vigilat » ("Je dors mais mon coeur veille"). In 1900, at the next Exposition Universelle, he was among the five lithographic artists selected to achieve two compositions on a selected theme; he received a gold medal at this contest.

He was created a Knight of the Legion of Honour. In 1921, he got the Medal of Honour of the Société des artistes français, in the engraving section, one of the more important honorary awards an artist could obtain in Paris. In 1925, Charles Léandre was promoted an Officer of the Legion of Honour.

== Gallery ==
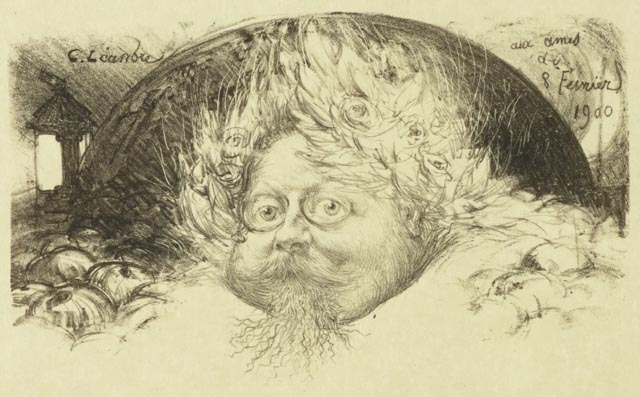
Selfportait 1900

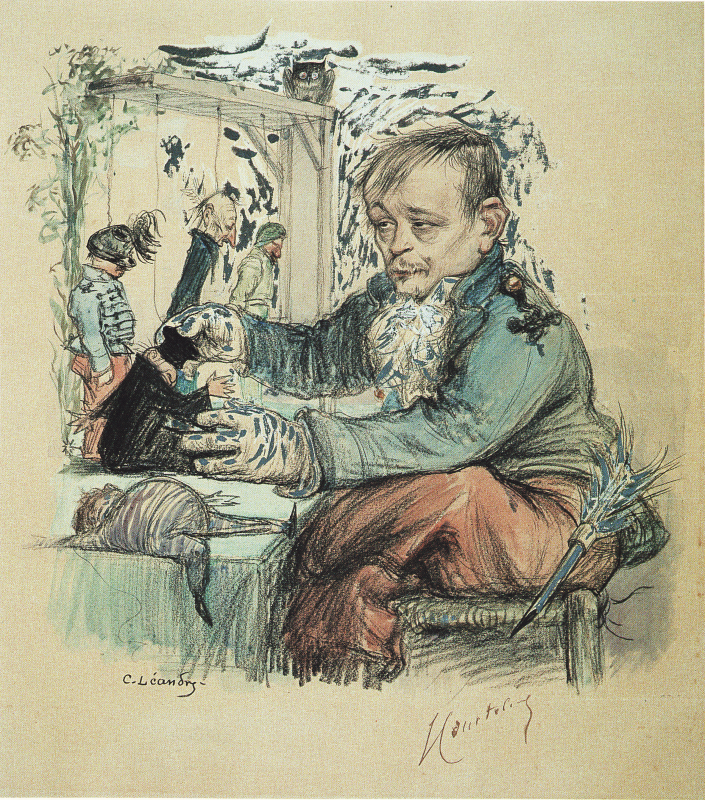
Courteline

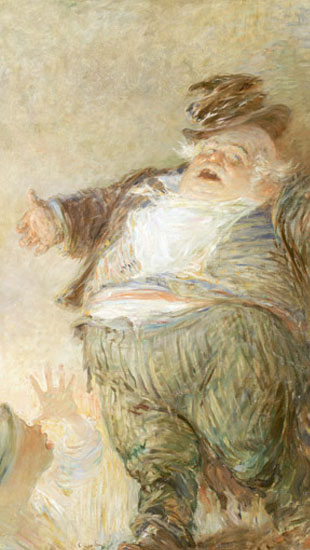
The mayor speech (Discours du maire)

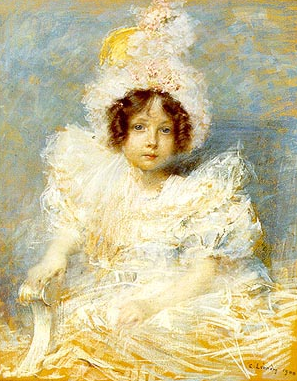
Mademoiselle Sybille Achard de Bonvouloir, Pastel, 1900

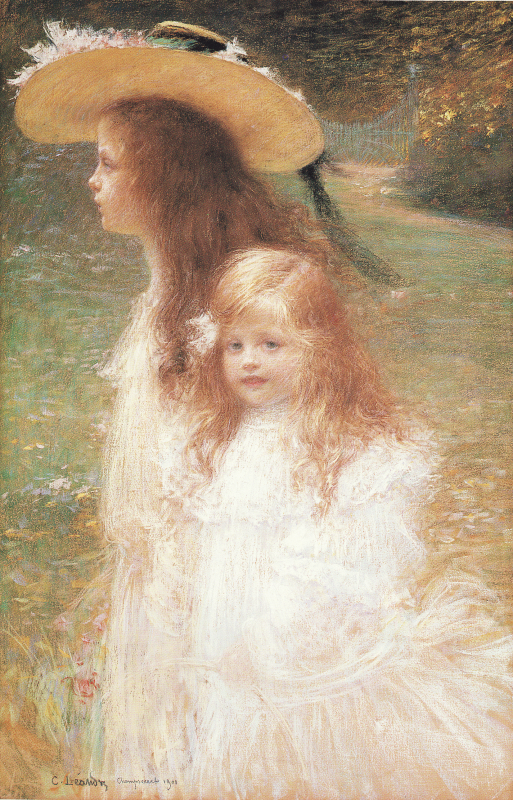
Jeanne et Madeleine Lemoine (Nièces de l'artiste) Pastel, 1901

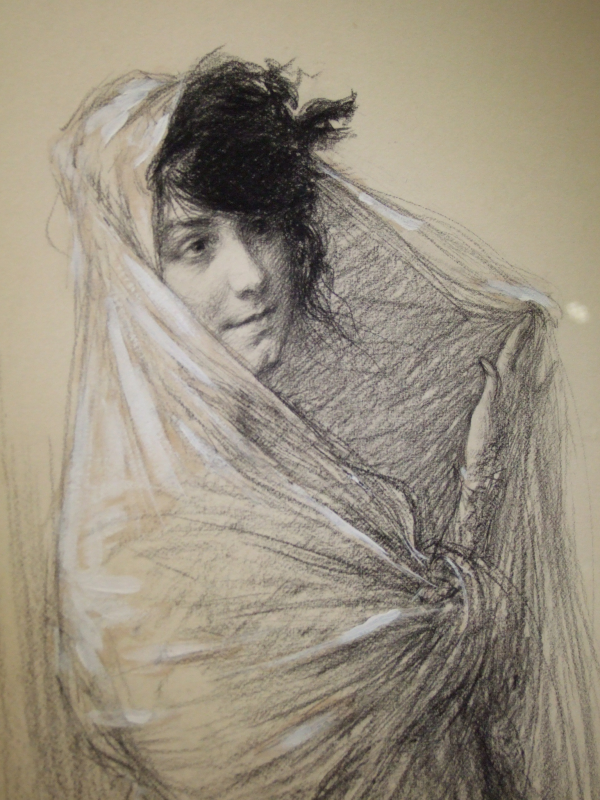
Jeune fille au châle,Pastel et fusain

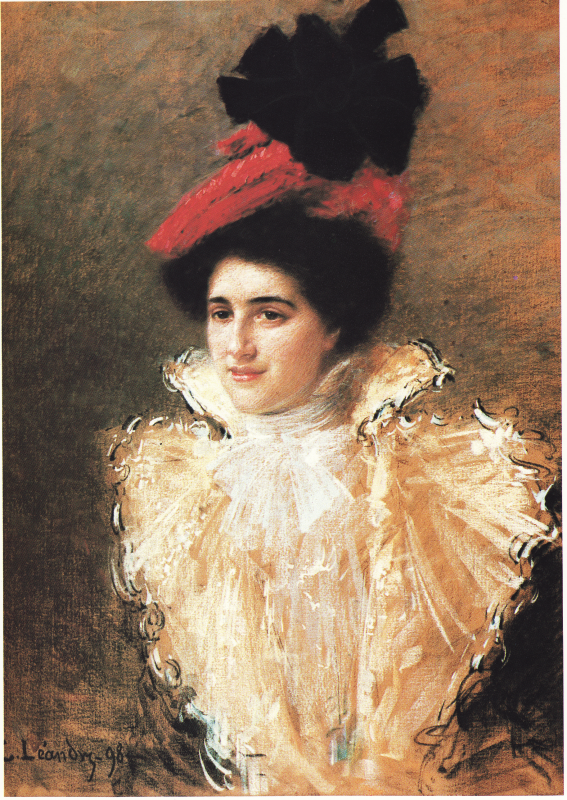
L'élégante au chapeau rouge, Pastel, 1898

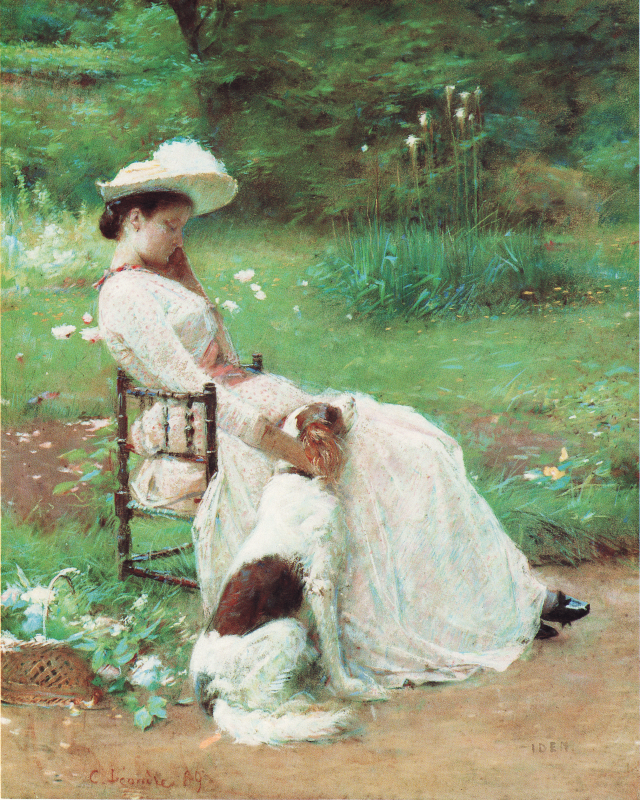
La femme au chien, Pastel, 1904

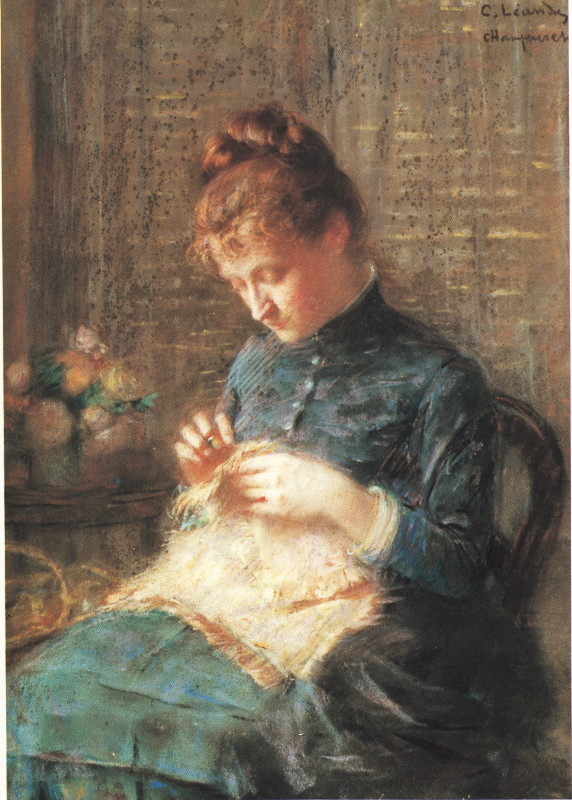
La mère du peintre, Pastel

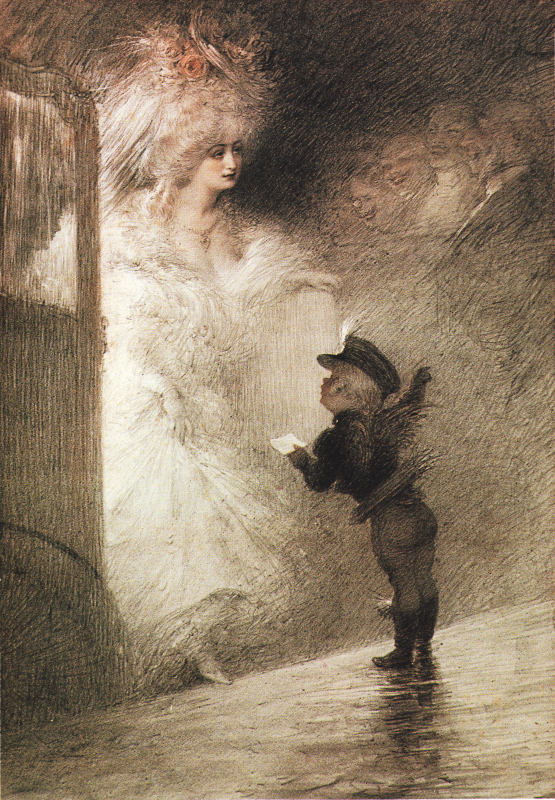
Le petit messager, Lithographie originale

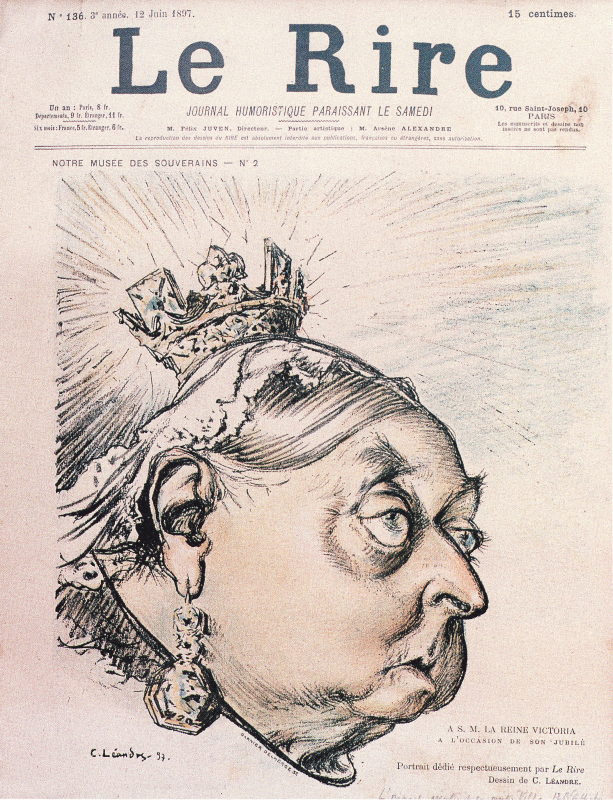
A S.M. La Reine Victoria, 1897

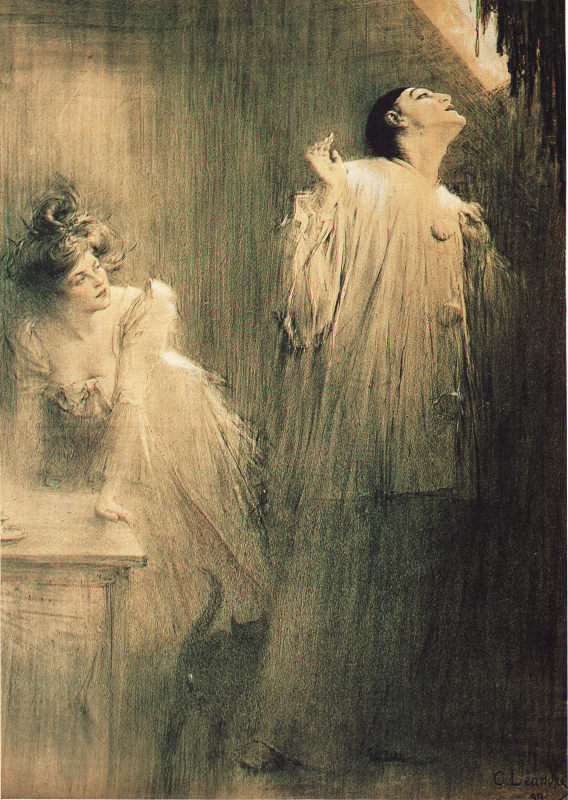
Pierrot et Colombine, ou Les Cantomines de Xavier Privas Poster, 1899

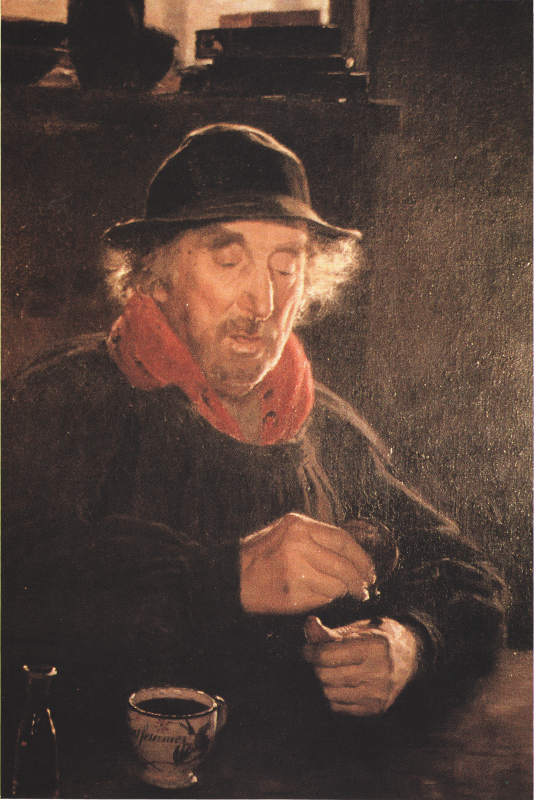
Le priseur normand, Painting, 1884

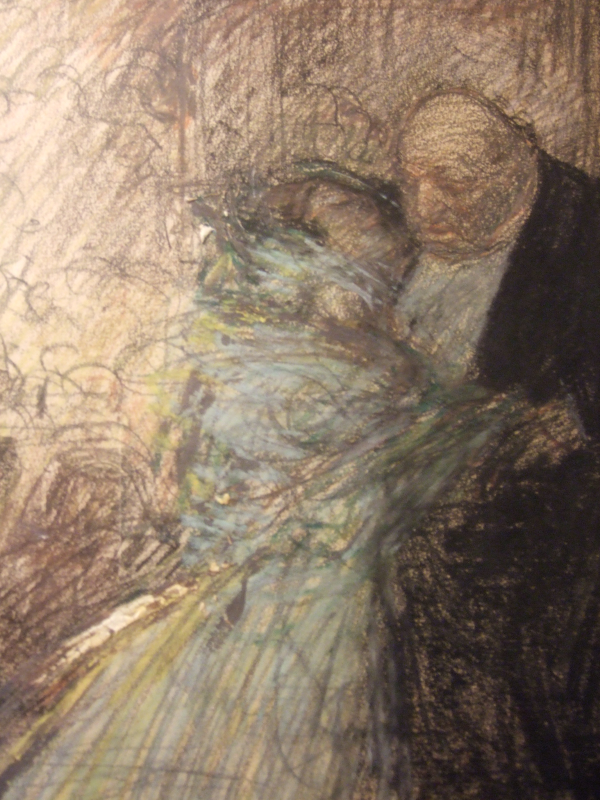
Valse

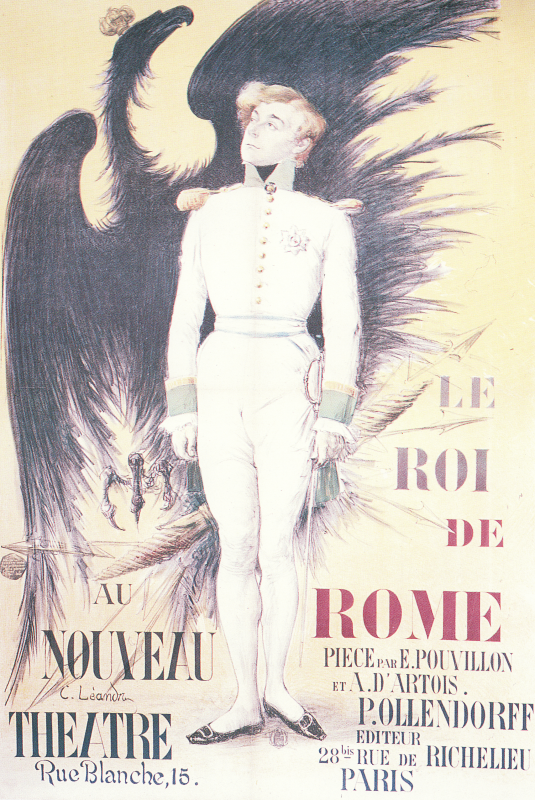
Le Roi de Rome, Poster

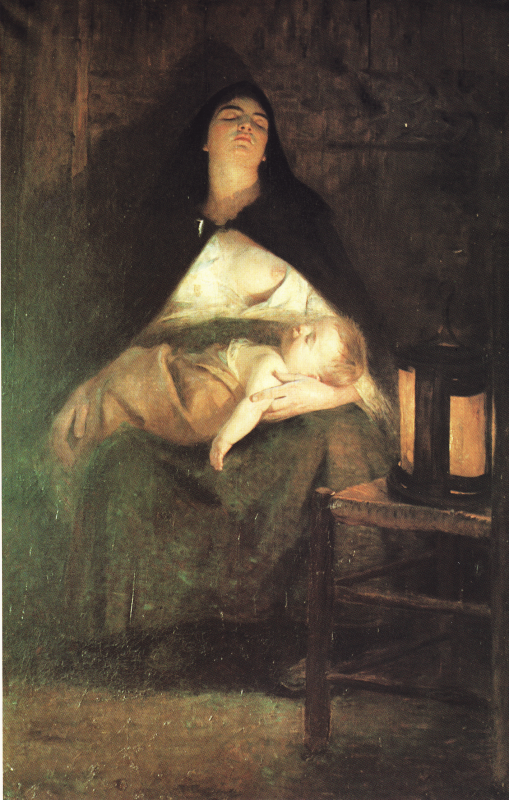
Je dors mais mon coeur veille, Painting, 1889

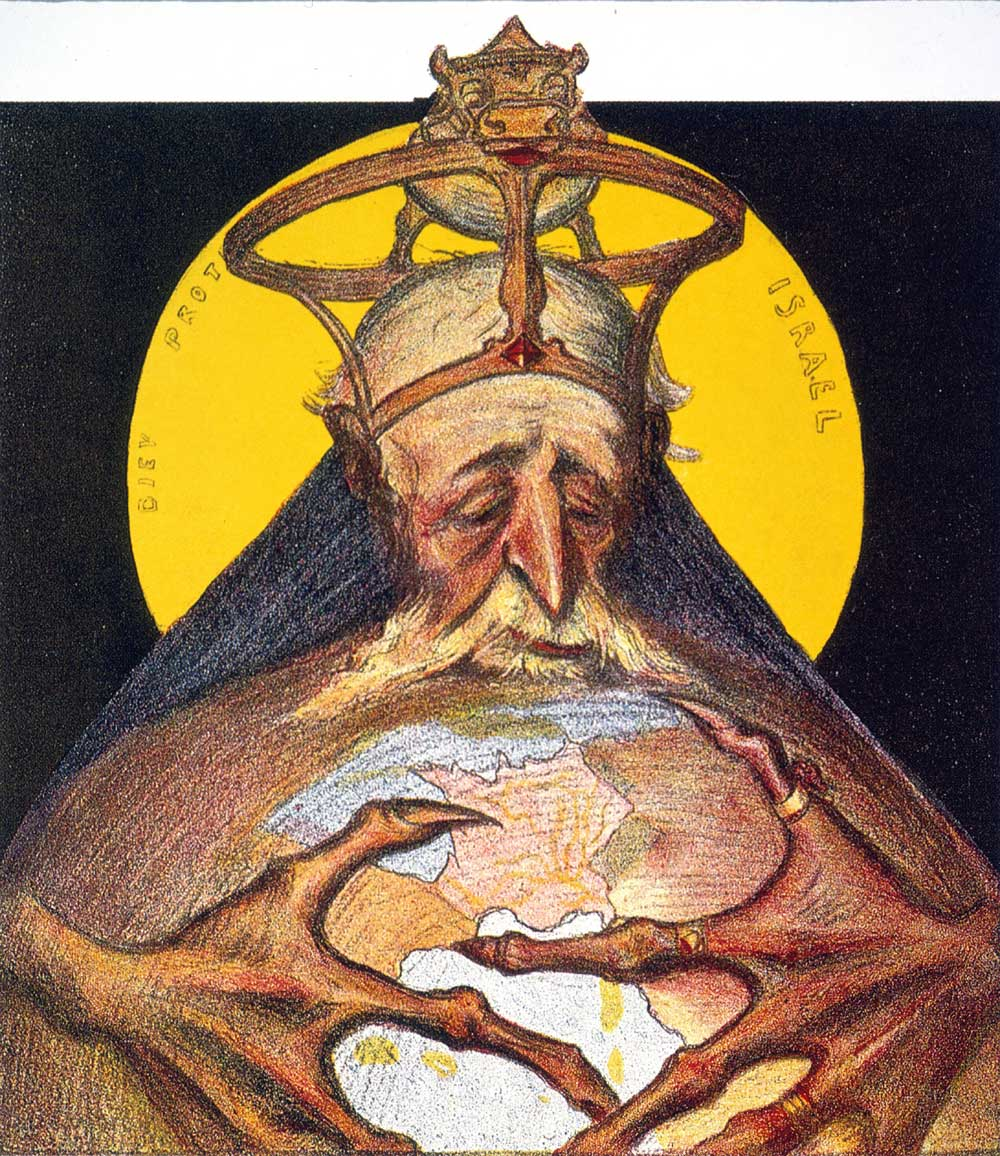
Rothschild, 1898

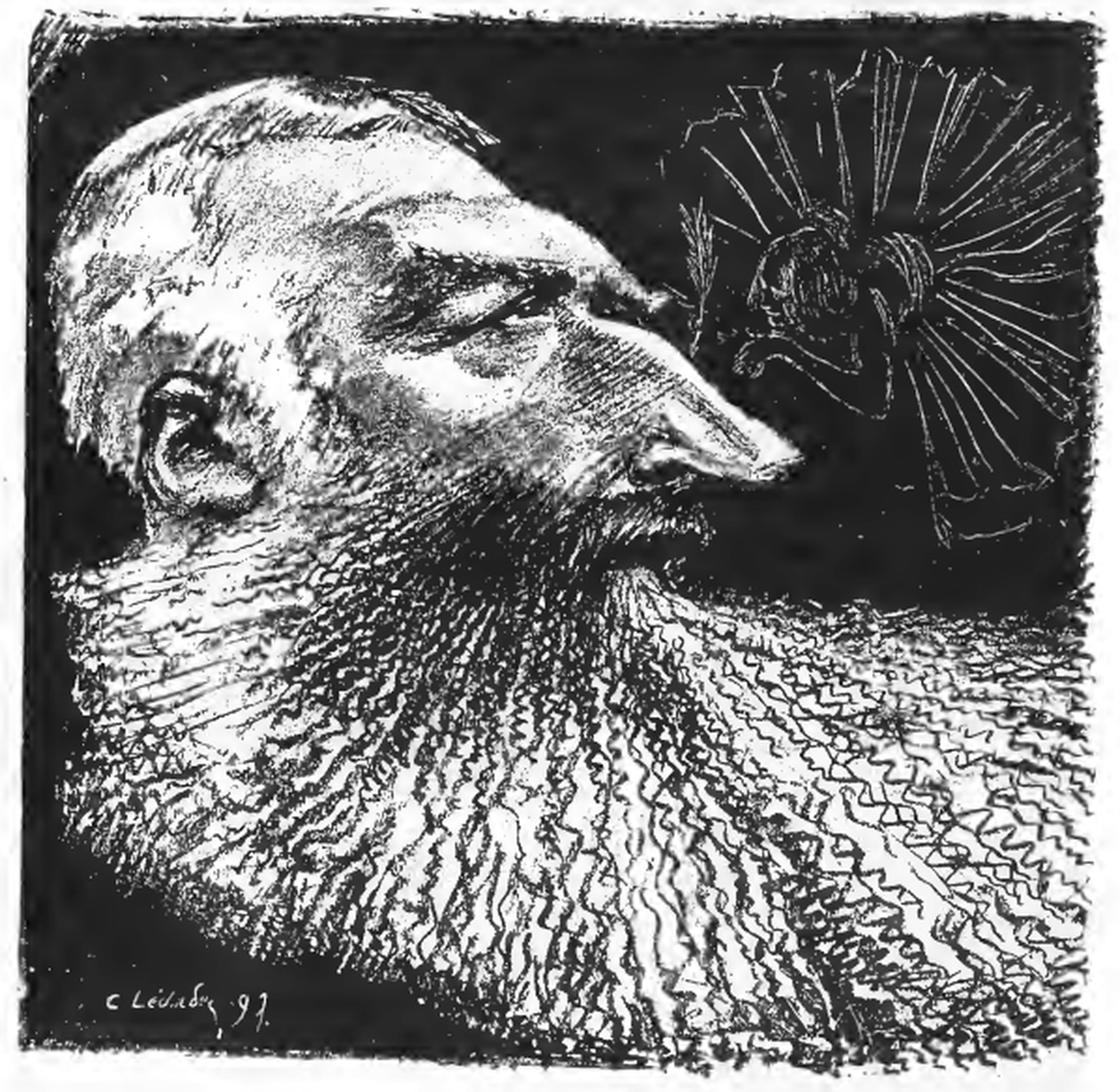
Leopold Roi Des Belges, 1897
