= Joseph Blanc =

French painter (1846–1904)

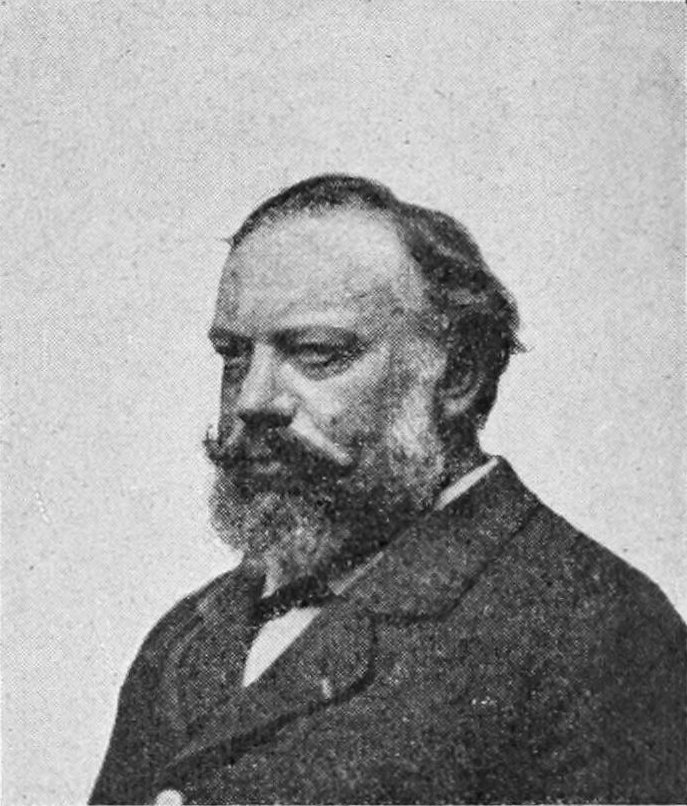
Joseph Blanc (mid 1890s)

Paul-Joseph Blanc (25 January 1846 – 5 July 1904) was a French painter who specialized in scenes from ancient history and mythology.

== Biography ==
He was born in Paris and studied at the École des Beaux Arts with Émile Bin and Alexandre Cabanel. In 1867, he was awarded the Prix de Rome for painting for his work The Murder of Laius by Œdipus and was named a professor at the École in 1889. His studio in Montmartre also served as an art school.

In addition to his favorite subjects, he produced many portraits of politicians, including Georges Clemenceau, Léon Gambetta and Paul Bert.

He participated in the decoration of several buildings; among them the Panthéon, where he painted The Vow of Clovis at the Battle of Tolbiac, The Baptism of Clovis and The Triumph of Clovis. His decorative paintings may also be seen at the Opéra-Comique and the Hôtel de Ville

He created a design for postage stamps as well. They featured the figure of Marianne and came in denominations from one through five, seven and a half, and ten centimes. They were also overprinted for use in the French colonies and were commonly referred to as "Blancs". The original engraved wooden block used to create the stamps is at the Musée de La Poste in Paris.

Blanc died in 1904 in Paris.

== Selected works ==
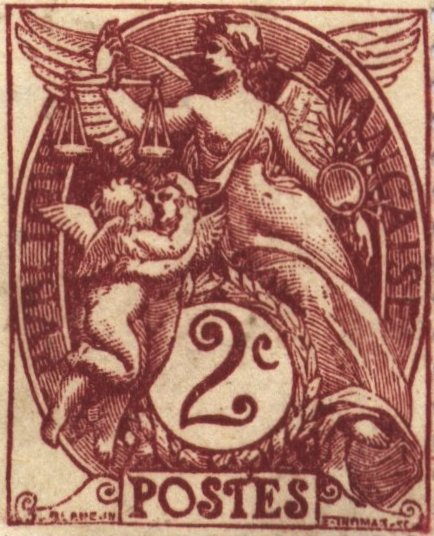
Two centime stamp. In use from 1900 to 1930

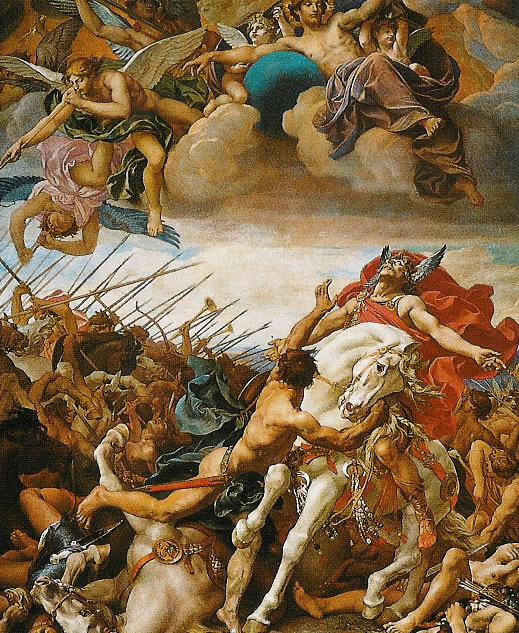
The Vow of Clovis at the Battle of Tolbiac

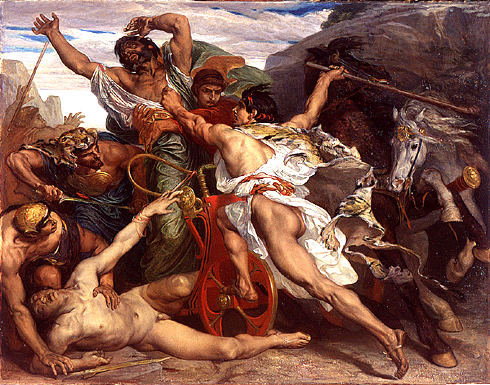
The Murder of Laius by Oedipus

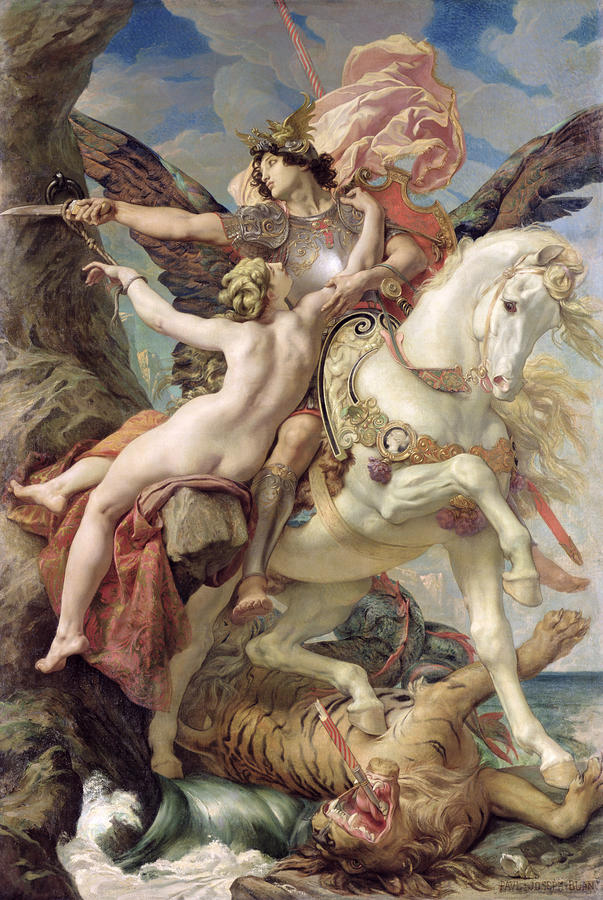
Ruggiero Rescuing Angelica
