= Ewa ad Amorem =

9th-century germanic law code

Start of the Ewa (rubric at left) in BN Lat. 4628A

Ewa ad Amorem, traditionally known as the Lex Francorum Chamavorum, is a 9th-century law code from the Carolingian Empire. It is generally counted among the leges barbarorum (barbarian laws), but it was not a national law. It applied only to a certain region in the Low Countries, although exactly where is disputed. Its association with the Chamavi is a modern conjecture.

== Title, manuscripts and editions ==
Ewa ad Amorem is known from two manuscript copies of the 10th century now in the National Library of France, BN Lat. 4628A and BN Lat. 9654 (Codex Sancti Vincentii Mettensis, from Metz). A 15th-century copy, identical to BN Lat. 4628A is found in BN Lat. 4631 (Codex Navarricus, from the College of Navarre). In BN Lat. 9654, the work is entitled Notitia vel commemoratio de illa euua quae se ad Amorem habet. In the 10th or 11th century, a scribe added the High German gloss gezunfti, meaning "pact, contract", to explain ewa. The word ewa is recorded in both Old Dutch and Old High German meaning "law" or "custom". It had a "technical legal function ... made clear by its adoption into the Latin vocabulary of the Leges Barbarorum to denote the unwritten customary law of different Germanic tribes as distinct from laws established by capitularies". Kees Nieuwenhuijsen translates euua quae se ad Amorem habet as "the law that they have along the Amor".

The name Lex Francorum Chamavorum (or simply Lex Chamavorum), which means "law of the Chamavian Franks", is a modern invention, derived from E. T. Gaupp's conclusion that the text belonged to the Hama(r)land, the Amor of the title, and his interpretation of this as the land of the Chamavi. The Latin text has been published at least four times and there are French, German, English and Dutch translations.

== Date and place ==
The work contains no internal indicators of ethnic or geographic attachment. Only the use of Amor in the title indicates a place, but its interpretation is uncertain. Traditionally, German scholars have identified Amor with the Hamaland, located partially in northwestern Germany, while Dutch scholars have placed it further west in the Netherlands. R. Fruin identified the Amor (or Ammor, Amer) with a lost river, whose name he thought was preserved in the placenames Groot-Ammers and Ammerstol, thus placing the land of Amor in Alblasserwaard, in the western Netherlands around the Waal. J. F. Niermeyer extended Amorland to cover the entire central Netherlands, including Batavia and extending north of the Rhine as far as the IJssel. Luit van der Tuuk argued that Dorestad represented its northern frontier and that it did not extend beyond the Rhine. Helmut Reimitz describes the law's subjects as "swamp Franks" living in the Rhine delta. In any case, Ewa ad Amorem is associated with the northern frontier of Francia facing the Frisians and Saxons.

Georg Pertz interpreted the phrases "in sanctis" and "in loco qui dicitur sanctum" in the Ewa ad Amorem as referring to Xanten and associated the text with that place. Although the spelling Sanctum for Xanten does occur in medieval Latin texts, it is more likely that here it means "holy".

The date of the text is uncertain, but its administrative language is certainly Carolingian. It is most probably of the 9th century. It has been connected with Charlemagne's codification program of 802–803, which also produced the Lex Thuringorum, Lex Frisionum and Lex Saxonum. If so, this suggests that the Ewa should also be associated with a land or people beyond the Rhine. Collectively, these four codes have been called karolingischen Stammesrechte ("Carolingian tribal laws"). Étienne Baluze thought the Ewa was the "forty-six articles concerning matters of necessity to God's church and the Christian people" issued at Aachen in 813 according to the Chronicle of Moissac. This thesis, however, is untenable.

== Legal content ==
The title as it appears in BN Lat. 9654 with the gloss gezunfti

Gaupp classified the Ewa as ethnic law, while Henri Froidevaux argued that it was royal law. Thomas Faulkner rejects both, preferring to see it as some sort of regional agreement (as the gloss gezunfti suggests) between two unequal but not ethnically distinct parties.

The Ewa is divided into 48 chapters. The first two are given in the first person, asserting that "we have" ecclesiastical matters and the bannum "as other Franks" have them. A total of eight chapters deal with the bannum, the right to command, both that of the king and that of his officials, such as counts and missi. Under the bannum, a person could be summoned to a placitum (the count's court), to do guard duty or to go to war. Failure to obey incurred a fine payable to the king, the so-called king's peace (fredus dominicus). The emphasis on the bannum, the fredus and the rights of the king and his officials sets the Ewa apart from, e.g., the Frankish Lex Salica.

In the Ewa, there are two senses of the word Francus (Frank): that indicated by the phrase alii Franci (other Franks) in chapters 1, 2 and 13 and that indicated by the phrase Francus homo (Frankish nobleman). In contrast to earlier leges barbarorum, wherein the homo ingenuus (freeman) is the highest social rank with the highest wergild (blood price), in the Ewa the Francus homo has a wergild three times higher than an ingenuus: 600 solidi versus 200. Traditionally, the Franci homines have been seen as recently arrived ethnically Frankish settlers living amongst a non-Frankish population. Alternatively, they may be the Uradel, the oldest strain of the local nobility, that had long before adopted a Frankish identity.

== Bibliography ==
=== Editions ===
- Baluze, Étienne, ed. (1677). "Capitulare tertium anni DCCCXIII". Capitularia regum Francorum. Vol. Tomus Primus. Paris. pp. 511–516.
- Sohm, Rudolph, ed. (1875). "Lex Francorum Chamavorum". Monumenta Germaniae Historica. Vol. Leges in folio V. Hanover. pp. 271–276. Reprinted in:
  Sohm, Rudolph, ed. (1883). "Lex Ribuaria et Lex Francorum Chamavorum". Monumenta Germaniae Historica. Vol. Fontes iuris Germanici antiqui in usum scholarum seperatim editi 6. Hanover. pp. 117–123.
- Eckhardt, K. A., ed. (1966). Lex Ribvaria II: Text und Lex Francorum Chamavorum. Hanover.
- Nieuwenhuijsen, Kees, ed. (2005). "Ewa ad Amorem: Lex Francorum Chamavorum". Latin with English and Dutch translations.

=== Secondary sources ===
- Eckhardt, K. A. (1934). Die Gesetze des Karolingerreiches, 714–911. Vol. 3: Sachsen, Thüringer, Chamaven und Friesen. Weimar.
- Elsakkers, Marianne (1999). "Raptus ultra Rhenum: Early Ninth-century Saxon Laws on Abduction and Rape". Amsterdamer Beiträge zur älteren Germanistik. 52 (1): 27–53. doi:10.1163/18756719-052-01-90000005.
- Faulkner, Thomas (2016). Law and Authority in the Early Middle Ages: The Frankish Leges in the Carolingian Period. Cambridge University Press. doi:10.1017/CBO9781316027097. ISBN 9781107084919.
- Froidevaux, Henri (1891). Études sur la 'Lex dicta Francorum Chamavorum' et sur les Francs du pays d'Amour. Hachette.
- Gaupp, E. T. (1855). Lex Francorum Chamavorum oder das vermeintliche Xantener Gaurecht. Breslau. Translated into French by S. Laboulaye as:
  Gaupp, E. T. (1855). "Recherches sur la Lex Francorum Chamavorum". Revue historique de droit français et étranger. 1: 417–443.
- Green, Dennis H. (1998). Language and History in the Early Germanic World. Cambridge University Press.
- Heidinga, H. A. (1987). Medieval Settlement and Economy North of the Lower Rhine: Archeology and History of Kootwijk and the Veluwe. Van Gorcum.
- Hoppenbrouwers, Peter (2013). "Leges Nationum and Ethnic Personality of Law in Charlemagne's Empire". In Jeroen Duindam; Jill Harries; Caroline Humfress; Nimrod Hurvitz (eds.). Law and Empire: Ideas, Practices, Actors. Brill. pp. 251–274. doi:10.1163/9789004249516. ISBN 9789004245297.
- Reimitz, Helmut (2022). "When the Bavarians Became Bavarian: The Politicization of Ethnicity and Crystallization of Ethnic Identities in the Shadow of Carolingian Rule (8th to 9th Century)". In Walter Pohl; Veronika Wieser (eds.). Emerging Powers in Eurasian Comparison, 200–1100: Shadows of Empire. Brill. pp. 137–178.

=== External links ===
- Lex Francorum Chamavorum at Bibliotheca Legum: A Database on Carolingian Secular Law Texts, .
- Lex Francorum Chamavorum at Geschichtsquellen des deutschen Mittelalters.
