= Lex Thuringorum =

The Lex Thuringorum ("Law of the Thuringians") is a law code that survives today in one 10th-century manuscript, the Codex Corbeiensis, alongside a copy of the Lex Saxonum, the law of the Saxons. The code was compiled in the first decade of the 9th century, probably 802–3, under Frankish patronage. The language of the law code is Latin and few Thuringians could have read it; nonetheless, some must have cooperated with Frankish officials during the process of collecting and codifying the customs. The Lex Thuringorum, the Lex Saxonum, the Lex Francorum Chamavorum and the Lex Frisionum comprise the four so-called "Carolingian tribal laws" (karolingischen Stammesrechte), because they were produced at the same time at the direction of Emperor Charlemagne in order to accommodate the differing legal customs of the nations living within his empire. They were neither totally faithful nor comprehensive reproductions of tribal law, but were created as part of a process of official christianisation. The historian Timothy Reuter writes that "the manuscript transmission does not suggest that [the Thuringian law] was extensively used, though there are enough different strata of law still visible in the text to suggest that it was not merely a literary exercise."

Per chapter 31 of the Lex Thuringorum, feuds were heritable: "To whomever an inheritance of land should descend, he also should receive the battlegear—that is to say, the breastplate—and the [obligations] of vengeance for kin and the payment of wergild." Karl Müllenhoff cited this passage to show that heritable feuds were of German origin, but more recent scholarship has rejected the view that the early medieval Germanic law codes represent pure Germanic law; rather they fuse Germanic and Roman customs.

In the Thuringian law, the severity of punishment for the crime of raptus (abduction) is equivalent to that for murder, an indication that the former was understood to include rape or sexual violence. Per chapter 47, a woman was permitted to have money, but not to spend it as she saw fit, nor was she to marry without permission.

== Editions ==
- "Lex Thuringorum", ed. Claudius von Schwerin, MGH, Fontes Iuris Germanici Antiqui. Hanover: 1918.
- "Lex Angliorum et Werinorum hoc est Thuringorum", ed. Karl Friedrich von Richthofen, MGH, Leges, I, v, 103–44.. Hanover: 1875–79.

== Sources ==
- Elsakkers, Marianne (1999). "Raptus ultra Rhenum: Early Ninth-century Saxon Laws on Abduction and Rape". Amsterdamer Beiträge zur älteren Germanistik. 52: 27–53. doi:10.1163/18756719-052-01-90000005.
- Jurasinski, Stefan (2006). Ancient Privileges: Beowulf, Law and the Making of Germanic Antiquity. Morgantown: West Virginia University Press.
- Reuter, Timothy (1991). Germany in the Early Middle Ages, c. 800–1050. London: Longman.
