= Germanic law =

Form of law followed by the early Germanic peoples

Opening of the Edictum Rothari in an 11th- or 12th-century manuscript

Germanic law is a scholarly term used to describe a series of commonalities between the various law codes (the Leges Barbarorum, 'laws of the barbarians', also called Leges) of the early Germanic peoples. These were compared with statements in Tacitus and Caesar as well as with high and late medieval law codes from Germany and Scandinavia. Until the 1950s, these commonalities were held to be the result of a distinct Germanic legal culture. Scholarship since then has questioned this premise and argued that many "Germanic" features instead derive from provincial Roman law. Although most scholars no longer hold that Germanic law was a distinct legal system, some still argue for the retention of the term and for the potential that some aspects of the Leges in particular derive from a Germanic culture. Scholarly consensus as of 2023 is that Germanic law is best understood in opposition to Roman law, in that it was not "learned" and incorporated regional peculiarities.

While the Leges Barbarorum were written in Latin and not in any Germanic vernacular, codes of Anglo-Saxon law were produced in Old English. The study of Anglo-Saxon and continental Germanic law codes has never been fully integrated.

== Definition and controversy ==
As of 2023, scholarly consensus is that Germanic law is best understood in contrast with Roman law, in that whereas Roman law was "learned" and the same across regions, Germanic law was not learned and incorporated regional peculiarities. This consensus has replaced an older one as a result of a reevaluation of notions of Germanic beginnings and the associated nationalist ideologies to which they were attached. Earlier scholars, inspired by Tacitus and Julius Caesar, often conceived of the Germanic peoples as a unified entity, which they were not. Because of this, Germanic law was not a single legal system, but a group of related systems.

Although Germanic law never appears to have been a competing, unified system to Roman law, commonalities in the Germanic laws can still be described as "Germanic" when contrasted with Roman law. These include emphases on orality, gesture, formulaic language, legal symbolism, and ritual. Some items in the Leges barbarorum (laws written by various continental Germanic peoples from the fifth to eighth centuries), such as the use of vernacular words, may reveal aspects of originally Germanic, or at least non-Roman law. Legal historian Ruth Schmidt-Wiegand writes that this vernacular, often in the form of Latinized words, belongs to "the oldest layers of a Germanic legal language" and shows some similarities to Gothic. The philologist and historian Dennis Howard Green stated that the introduction of Germanic "vernacular legal terms, even in partly Latinized form" does not occur until the early Middle Ages and that only "vernacular" terminology was "legally precise enough to convey what barbarian practice meant".

=== Old consensus and criticism ===
The study of "Germanic Law" arose in the modern period, at a time when scholars thought that the written and unwritten principles of the ancient Germanic peoples could be reconstructed in a reasonably coherent form. Beginning in the Reformation, the study of "Germanic law" was typically conflated with "German law", a tradition continued by influential scholars Jacob Grimm, Karl von Amira, and Heinrich Brunner. This law supposedly revealed the national character of the Germans. Until the middle of the 20th century, the majority of scholars assumed the existence of a distinct Germanic legal culture and law. This law was seen as an essential element in the formation of modern European law and identity, alongside Roman and canon law.

Scholars reconstructed Germanic law on the basis of antique (Caesar and Tacitus), early medieval (mainly the so-called Leges Barbarorum), and late medieval sources (mostly Scandinavian). According to these scholars, Germanic law was based on a society ruled by assemblies of free farmers (the things), policing themselves in clan groups (Sippes), and engaging in the blood feud outside of clan groups, which were settled via compensation in the form of blood money (wergild). This reconstructed legal system also excluded certain criminals by outlawry, and administratively contained a degree of sacral kingship; retinues formed around the kings bound by oaths of loyalty.

Early ideas about Germanic law have come under intense scholarly scrutiny since the 1950s and specific aspects of it such as the legal importance of kinship groups, retinues, and loyalty, and the concept of outlawry, can no longer be justified. Besides the assumption of a common Germanic legal tradition and the use of sources of different types from different places and time periods, there are no known native sources for early Germanic law. Caesar and Tacitus do mention some aspects of Germanic legal culture that reappear in later sources; however, their texts are not objective reports of facts, and there are no other antique sources to corroborate whether there were common Germanic institutions.

Reinhard Wenskus has shown that one important "Germanic" element, the use of popular assemblies, displays marked similarities to developments among the Gauls and Romans, and was therefore likely the result of external influence rather than specifically Germanic. Even the Leges Barbarorum were all written under Roman and Christian influence and often with the help of Roman jurists. Beginning with Walter Goffart, scholars have argued the Leges contain large amounts of "Vulgar law", a historiographic construct invented in 1880 to describe deviations from Classical norms found in law books and documents from the Roman provinces. This makes it difficult to determine whether commonalities between them derive from a common Germanic legal conception or not.

== The Leges Barbarorum ==
The term Leges Barbarorum 'laws of the barbarians', used by editor Paolo Canciani as early as 1781, reflects a negative value judgement on the actual law codes produced by these Germanic peoples. It was retained by the editors of the Monumenta Germaniae Historica in the 19th century. The law codes are written in Latin, often using many Latinized Germanic terms, with the exception of the Anglo-Saxon law codes, which were written in the vernacular as early as the 6th century. The Leges share features such as orality, the importance of court procedure, and a reliance on compensatory justice to settle disputes.

The Leges are the product of a mixture of Germanic, late Roman, and early Christian legal cultures. Generally speaking, the further on the periphery of the Roman Empire these law codes were issued, the less influence they appear to show from Roman jurisprudence. Thus, Dusil, Kannowski, and Schwedler argue that the Visigothic law codes show a great deal of Roman influence, whereas the Lex Salica shows basically none.

=== History ===
The earliest of the Leges dealt with Germanic groups living either as foederati or conquerors among Roman people and regulating their relationship to them. These earliest codes, written by Visigoths in Spain (475), (Note: A second early listing of some laws, the fragmentary Edictum Theodorici, is either ascribed to the Ostrogoths in Italy (probably in the reign of Theodoric the Great) or is another example of a Visigothic code by their king Theodoric II.) were probably not intended to be valid solely for the Germanic inhabitants of these kingdoms, but for the Roman ones as well. These earliest law codes influenced those that followed, such as the Burgundian Lex Burgundionum (between 480 and 501) issued by king Gundobad, and the Frankish Lex Salica (between 507 and 511), possibly issued by Clovis I. The final law code of this earliest series of codifications was the Edictus Rothari, issued in 643 by the Lombard King Rothari.

The next set of law codes to be composed, the Lex and Pactus Alemannorum and the Lex Bajuvariorum, were written in the 8th century, probably at the behest of the Catholic Church. The final set of law codes issued on the continent, the Ewa ad Amorem, Lex Frisonum, Lex Saxonum, and Lex Thuringorum, were written under the patronage of Charlemagne in the 9th century; these codes all show marked similarities to the early codes.

Law code	People	Issuer	Year of completion/ approval
Code of Euric	Visigoths	Euric	c. 480
Lex Burgundionum	Burgundians	Gundobad	c. 500
Lex Salica	Salian Franks	Clovis I	c. 500
Law of Æthelberht	Kingdom of Kent	Æthelberht of Kent	early 7th century
Pactus Alamannorum	Alamanni		c. 620
Lex Ripuaria	Ripuarian Franks		630s
Edictum Rothari	Lombards	Rothari	643
Lex Visigothorum	Visigoths	Recceswinth	654
Law of Hlothhere and Eadric	Kingdom of Kent	Hlothhere and Eadric of Kent	late 7th century
Law of Wihtred	Kingdom of Kent	Wihtred of Kent	after 690
Lex Alamannorum	Alamanni		730
Lex Bajuvariorum	Bavarians		c. 745
Lex Frisionum	Frisians	Charlemagne	c. 785
Lex Saxonum	Saxons	Charlemagne	803
Lex Thuringorum	Thuringians	Charlemagne	9th century
Ewa ad Amorem	Part of the Low Countries	Unknown	9th century

== Common elements ==
=== Sources and nature of the law ===
In contrast to Roman Law, which was generally created by the emperors, Germanic legal culture regarded the law as unchanging, and it was thus necessary to find the law in any individual case. Laws existed because they were traditional and because similar cases had been decided before. This is clearly displayed in the prologue of the Lex Salica, in which four men are described as having ascertained what the law was rather than creating it. Most of the Leges refer to having been composed through a meeting of the great men of the kingdom, of its army, or of its people; whereas the southern Leges mention the role of the king, the northern ones do not.

A word attested meaning "law" as well as "religion" in West Germanic languages is represented by Old High German êwa; (Note: The etymology is unclear but probably represents a Proto-Germanic *aiwa-, which may have been a combination of two roots, one related to Sanskrit eva (law) and one related to Latin aevum eternity.) there is some evidence for the word's existence from names preserved in Old Norse and Gothic. Êwa is used in the Latin texts of the Leges barbarorum to mean the unwritten laws and customs of the people, but comes also to refer to the codified written laws as well. Jacob Grimm argued that Êwa's use to also mean "religion" meant there was also a religious dimension to pre-Christian Germanic law; Ruth Schmidt-Wiegand argues instead that the legal term êwa was given a Christian religious significance by Christian missionaries, in common with other legal terms that lacked any pagan religious significance that acquired Christian meanings.

=== Orality and literacy ===
The Germanic peoples had an originally entirely oral legal culture, which involved a great deal of legally significant ritual, gesture, language, and symbolism, in order to create a specific legal procedure. Because oral law can never be fixed in the same way as written law, the use of correct procedure was in fact more important than the ultimate legal decision reached, and the law was ultimately whatever the community decided was valid at a given time.

Due to the originally oral nature of Germanic law, the act of putting the Leges into writing was already an act of synthesis with the Roman legal culture. The development of the different law codes shows a general trend away from an oral legal culture toward a text-based writing culture. It is unclear to what extent the written legal texts were used in court: whereas Patrick Wormald and many German scholars have argued that the Leges texts mostly existed for reasons of representation and prestige, other scholars, such as Rosamund McKitterick, have argued that the number of surviving manuscripts and physical indications of their frequent use means that they were in fact employed in practice.

=== Germanic legal language ===
Germanic legal vocabulary is reconstructed from multiple sources, including early loanwords in Finnic languages, supposed translations of Germanic terms in Tacitus, apparently legal terms in the Gothic Bible, elements in Germanic names, Germanic words found in the Leges barbarorum, as well as in later vernacular legal texts, beginning with Old English (7th–9th centuries). There is no evidence for a universal Proto-Germanic legal terminology; rather the individual languages show a diversity of legal terminologies, with the earliest examples lacking even a common Germanic word for "law". There are, however, many examples of Germanic legal terms shared across the different early codes which point to shared legal traditions.

=== Marriage ===
Modern scholarship no longer posits a common Germanic marriage practice, and there is no common Germanic term for "marriage". Until the latter 20th century, legal historians, using the Leges and later Norse narrative and legal sources, divided Germanic marriages into three types:

1. Muntehe, characterized by a marriage treaty, the granting of a bride gift or morning gift to the bride, and the acquisition of munt (mundium in the Lombard Laws, meaning "protection", originally "hand"), or legal power, of the husband over the wife;
2. Friedelehe, (from Old High German: friudila, Old Norse: friðla, frilla "beloved"), a form of marriage lacking a bride or morning gift and in which the husband did not have munt over his wife (this remained with her family);
3. Kebsehe (concubinage), the marriage of a free man to an unfree woman.

According to this theory, in the course of the early Middle Ages, the Friedelehe, Kebsehe, and polygamy were abolished in favor of the Muntehe through the attacks of the Church.

None of the three forms of marriage posited by older scholarship appear as such in medieval sources. Academic works in the 1990s and 2000s rejected the notion of Friedelehe as a construct for which no evidence is found in the sources, while Kebsehe has been explained as not being a form of marriage at all.

== Institutions ==
=== The "tribe"/gens ===
Traditionally, the earliest state organization among the Germanic peoples has been described as a "tribe". "Tribes" were argued to have been stable, genetically and culturally united nations that had their own laws, territories, and proto-state institutions. The use of the word "tribe" includes the implication that the various Germanic peoples were in fact subdivisions of a larger "Germanic" people. According to this understanding, the "tribes" would then go on to found the individual early Germanic kingdoms of Late Antiquity and the Early Middle Ages as "tribal states".

Since the work of Reinhard Wenskus in the 1960s, scholars have begun to use the term gens (plural gentes), communities claiming (rather than possessing) shared biological descent, as a way to distance discussion of Germanic tribes from this earlier way of thinking. In this new understanding, Germanic peoples were not stable ethnic units, but were constantly breaking up and reforming in a process of ethnogenesis. Moreover, it is unclear whether the gentes formed the early Germanic kingdoms, or whether they were not instead created as part of the process of state formation.

Besides the claim of shared descent, Wenskus also saw the individual gentes as having and developing their own legal orders. Almost all gentes that became post-Roman polities adopted their own law, and the individual Leges, as well as other early medieval sources, mention that the laws belong to individual "people" under various Latin terms (including populus, natio, gens). However, disagreement exists about whether these written sources are still part of the "gentile system" of laws, or whether such a system even lasted into the High Middle Ages with the Sachsenspiegel.

Traditionally, the Leges have been understood as only applying to one ethnically defined gens within a kingdom, thus excluding Romans and any other gens that was incorporated into a polity - persons belonging to that group would be judged by their own law ("personality of law"). However, scholarly disagreement exists whether the earliest law codes, those of the Goths and Burgundians, were meant for all persons in their territory or only those of a particular ethnicity. The Lex Salica is far clearer in making ethnic distinctions in the text, perhaps encouraging assimilation to Frankish identity. By the Carolingian period, confusion between social status and ethnicity on the one hand and between ethnic and territorial law on the other had essentially turned the system into one of "mobile territorial law", in which a person could claim the law of their territory of birth.

=== The assembly ===
In common with many archaic societies without a strong monarchy, early Germanic law appears to have had a form of popular assembly. The earliest attested term for these assemblies in Germanic is the thing. (Note: Probably related to þeihs "time" (from PGmc *þinhaz) and meaning originally the time at which the assembly was appointed to meet. In the Lex Salica and laws influenced by it, the Latinized vernacular term mallus or mallum, from PGmc *maþla- "speech, assembly", is used to refer to the assembly instead.) According to Tacitus, during the Roman period, such assemblies were called at the new or full moon and were where important decisions were made (Tacitus, Germania 11–13). Germanic assemblies functioned both to make important political decisions—or to legitimate decisions taken by rulers—as well as functioning as courts of law. In their earliest function as courts, the assemblies do not appear to have had presiding judges. Rather, the members collectively came to judgments based on consensus and acted more as arbiters than as courts in the modern sense.

The assembly stood under the protection of the gods, and feuding parties could visit it without fear of violence. The use of thing as an epithet in a 3rd-century AD inscription dedicated to "Mars Thingsus", apparently referring to the Germanic god Tyr, as well as the translation of the Roman dies Martii ("day of Mars", Tuesday) as dingsdag ("day of the thing", modern German Dienstag) as a variant of tîsdag ("day of Tyr"), has led to the theory that the thing stood under the protection of Tyr in pagan times.

The Leges Alamannorum specified that all free men were required to appear at a popular assembly, but such a specification is otherwise absent for the Frankish Merovingian period. In later periods outside Scandinavia, the assemblies were composed of important persons rather than the entire free population. The Visigothic laws lack any mention of a popular assembly, while the Anglo-Saxon laws and history show no evidence of any kingdom-wide popular assemblies, only smaller local or regional assemblies held under various names.

=== Kingship ===
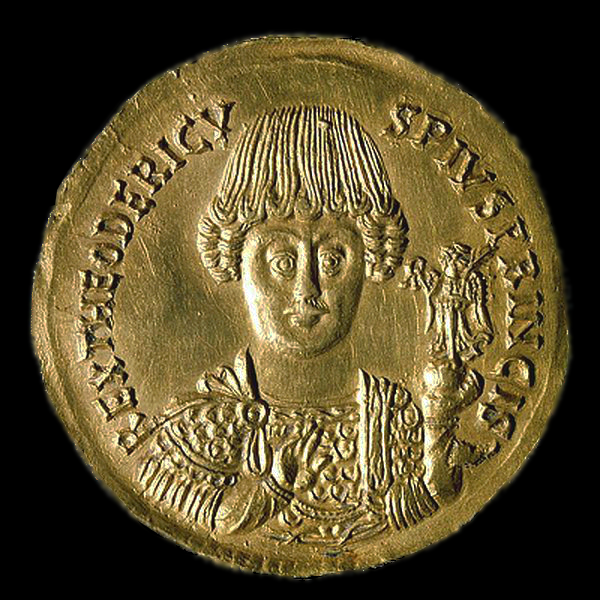
Medallion or triple solidus of the Ostrogothic king Theodoric the Great, reading: Rex Theodericus Pius Princis "King Theodoric, pious prince(?)"

Germanic languages attest many different terms that mean king, including þiudans, truhtin and cuning. Terms for Germanic rulers in Roman sources include reges ("kings"), principes ("chieftains"), and duces ("leaders/dukes"); however, all of these terms are foreign ascriptions rather than necessarily reflecting native terminology. Stefanie Dick suggests that these Latin terms are not used with any real differentiation in Roman sources and should all be translated as "leaders".

Not all Germanic peoples are attested as having had kings, and different kings seem to have different functions and roles. Peoples without kings included at various times the Herules, the Gepids, and the Saxons. According to Tacitus kings were elected from a group of eligible candidates by the people, but had no power of command (Germania, 7). Walter Pohl argues that the authority of the king was probably personal rather than directly related to the office. The power of the kings grew over time: while they originally seem to have been mostly military leaders, they became more institutionalized, authoritative rulers in the course of the migration period.

Scholars debate the origins of Germanic kingship. Tacitus makes a distinction between "kings" and "dukes", in that the kings were chosen because of their nobility and the dukes for their prowess in battle. This statement has been used to explain Germanic kingship as having had a sacral and a military component, which were later united. However, more recent scholarship has shown that sacral kingship is not well attested outside of much later Scandinavian sources, whereas kingship for military leadership is. Dennis Howard Green argues for a development of the terminology from þiudans to truhtin to cuning, reflecting a change in the nature of Germanic kingship first to a primarily military institution and then to a more permanent, dynastic institution.

=== The kinship group ===
The Germanic languages attest several words for clans or kinship groups, most prominently the cognates of Old High German sibba and kunni, found in this meaning in all Germanic languages. According to the traditional understanding of Germanic law, the clan contained all blood relations and was essential for the protection and help of the individual. Individuals were argued to have no relation to the larger tribal state outside of the clan. It aided him in seeking revenge (see feuding), receiving wergild for those who were slain or injured (see compensatory justice), and acted as oath helpers.

Current scholarship acknowledges the existence of clan groups as a social factor among the Germanic peoples, but argues that there was never organized, legally recognized clans as postulated by older scholarship. Both Germanic terms and those found in the Leges for kinship groups are not precise enough to indicate that the clans existed as legal entities: instead, the group of "relations" that a person could call on were not fixed or stable.

== Legal proceedings ==
=== Feuding ===
The feud (in the Leges, faida) (Note: The Latin form derives from one of several descendants of Proto-Germanic *ga-faih-iþō-, meaning "enmity," "vengeance".) refers to a form of violent self-help whereby a wronged party sought to address a wrong by exacting violence or vengeance themselves. German scholars tend to understand the feud as a legal institution based on individual liberty, the lack of a powerful public authority, and the need for local conflict resolution, whereas Francophone scholarship has instead emphasized feuding as illegal activity. Whereas Roman law did not allow feuding, the Leges generally treated any legal matter as something that might be settled privately.

While some scholars have argued that the feud may have originated in "vulgar law," the feud is ubiquitous in the Leges and of later Germanic literature, making a non-Roman origin fairly certain. However, the different Leges make different assumptions about feuds and do provide a uniform picture of how they looked or functioned. The existence of feuds between kindred groups among the earlier Germanic peoples is mentioned by Tacitus in Germania chap. 12 and 21, including the various steps taken for conflict resolution. The post-Roman Barbarian kingdoms appear to have seen an increase in non-state violence and violent deaths with the decline in central authority. The various Leges show attempts to limit the practice in feuding, without, however, ultimately preventing it.

=== Compensatory justice ===
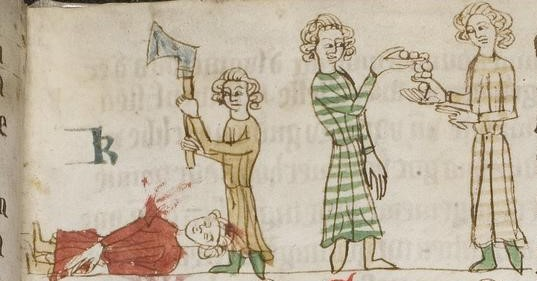
Image of a murder committed by a minor and the subsequent paying of wergild by his guardian, Heidelberger Sachsenspiegel Cgm 165 fol. 11r. This is one of the only images of wergild payment from the Middle Ages.

All of the Leges contain catalogues of compensation prices to be paid by the perpetrator to his victims or the victim's relatives for committing a personal offense. In the West Germanic languages, this payment is known by the term Old High German: buoza, Old English: bōta. This form of legal reconciliation aimed to prevent the erupting of feuds by offering a peaceful way to end disputes between groups. The codification of these catalogues was encouraged by the kings of the individual Germanic kingdoms, who had an interest in preventing bloodshed. Some of the laws, such as the Lex Salica and the Lex Thuringiorum, require that part of the compensation for theft be paid to the king. Later, some kings attempted to replace the compensation system with other forms of justice, such as the death penalty.

In the event that a person was killed or wounded, an animal was stolen, or other offenses committed the compensation is referred to as wergild. (Note: The term is the most frequent one found in Old English and Old High German. In the Nordic languages the term mangæld is used. Alternative terms in the Leges include leudardi, from leod ("man").) Scholars debate if wergild was a traditional Germanic legal concept, or if it developed from a Roman predecessor. The various codes uniformly gradate compensations according to whether an individual was fully free, half free, or enslaved. Some also make distinctions by status among free persons, as with the Lex Burgundonum, while the Lex Salica shows no gradation among free males. The prices were sometimes higher than could readily be paid, which could result in a compromise. In other cases, social networks were enlisted to help a defendant, or the church lent money to end the feud. Payment could be taken in kind rather than in currency. When compensations could not be paid, the plaintiff had the option to enslave the defendant.

Patrick Wormald has emphasized the variety of compensations for various offenses and taken this as an indication of the absence of uniformity across the codes. More recent scholarship has instead argued that the range of enumerated offenses for personal injury is generally uniform or at least patterned across the codes and that the compositions mirror one another closely if calculated as a percentage of an individual's Wergild value, indications of a shared tradition.

=== Judicial ordeal ===
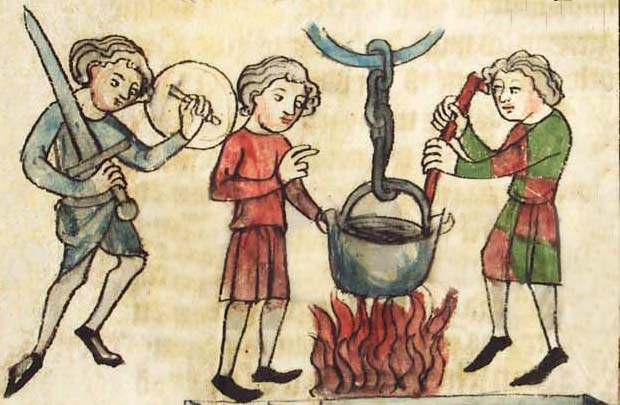
Ordeal of boiling water, from manuscript HAB Cod. Guelf. 3.1 Aug. 2° of the Sachsenspiegel, fol. 19v.

The ordeal (judicium Dei "judgment of God") was a method used to cause God to reveal the guilt or innocence of a person accused of a crime. It relied on the notion that God would intervene in the world to prevent the condemnation of an innocent person. Similar practices are attested in other cultures around the world, including in the Code of Hammurabi. Methods found in the Leges and in later medieval laws included the trial by hot water, in which a person dipped their hand into a boiling cauldron, of hot iron, in which a person carried a burning hot iron, and trial by combat, in which two fighters fought to determine the guilt or innocence of the accused party. The most important of these was the trial by combat.

A Germanic origin for the trial by combat is generally accepted. It appears early and widely among many Germanic peoples. Dusil, Kannowski, and Schwedler write that it is an important difference between Germanic and Roman law, and derive it from the time prior to Germanic contact with the Romans.

Unlike for the trial by combat, scholars debate whether the trials by fire and water were inspired by Christianity or derive from pre-Christian Germanic tradition. Robert Bartlett argues for a Frankish origin of the practice of trial by fire and water, with Frankish influence spreading it around Europe. He argues that the practice is absent in the early Burgundian, Alemannic, Bavarian, and Kentish law codes and therefore cannot have a pan-Germanic origin. Heinz Holzhauer instead argues that ordeal by fire and water was a common Germanic, pre-Christian method of trial, which he connects to the casting of lots found in Tacitus.

=== Oaths and oath-helpers ===
The judicial oath swearing to or denying the validity of an accusation was one of the most important methods of proof in the Leges and in early medieval law more generally. It is unclear how far back judicial oaths as an element of the laws of the Germanic peoples can be traced; however, because they are found in the earliest attested judicial charters, it is usually associated with the Germanic law. (Note: The term meaning "oath" is consistent in the various Germanic languages, showing descendants of the Proto-Germanic word *aiþaz. In addition to judicial oaths, oaths of loyalty taken by individuals as part of a lord's retinue are attested among Germanic peoples even in pre-Christian times, and are specifically attested for the Goths, Lombards, Anglo-Saxons, and Merovingian Franks. In addition, several of these peoples attest a general oath of loyalty taken by all subjects of the king; this particular type of oath may have its roots in Roman late antiquity.) Oaths of some sort are found in almost all cultures, and function as a means to ensure the truth of a statement by calling for divine punishment if the swearer breaks the oath, similar to the ordeal.

In the Leges, but especially in Frankish law, the judicial oath often took the form of compurgation, an oath of innocence sworn by the accused with the help of oath-helpers. (Note: In Latin sources "oath-helpers" are known as (con)iuratores or testes. Vernacular terms include the Langobardic aido, Old English æwde and Frankish hamédja and Old High German gieido. The modern term "oath-helper" (Eidhelfer) probably comes from the Late medieval German term helfer "helper".) The exact age and origin of the oath-helpers is unclear; however, this institution was far more important in these law codes than in any other legal culture. The precise number of oath-helpers varied depending on what was being sworn, with some of the Leges also requiring different numbers for different social classes. These oath-helpers were not material witnesses to the accuracy of the oath, but rather simply support the swearer in his or her oath. They thus serve to attest the good character of the swearer; their own reputation will be harmed if he has lied.

In the earliest law codes, there does not seem to have been any judicial sanction for breaking a judicial oath. However, later leges show increasingly drastic punishments under the influence of the Church, including the death penalty in the Lex Saxonum.

== See also ==
- Medieval Scandinavian laws
- Anglo-Saxon law

== Sources ==
- Bartlett, Robert (1986). Trial by Fire and Water: The Medieval Judicial Ordeal. Oxford University Press. ISBN 9780198219736.
- Beck, Heinrich (2010) [2005]. "Sühne". Germanische Altertumskunde Online.
- Beck, Heinrich; Köbler, Gerhard (2010) [1986]. "Eid". Germanische Altertumskunde Online.
- Beck, Heinrich; Wenskus, Reinhard; et al. (2010) [1984]. "Ding". Germanische Altertumskunde Online.
- Buchholz, Stephan (2008). "Ehe". Handwörterbuch zur deutschen Rechtsgeschichte. Vol. 1 (2nd ed.). pp. 1192–1213.
- Dick, Stefanie (2008). Der Mythos vom "germanischen" Königtum: Studien zur Herrschaftsorganisation bei den germanischsprachigen Barbaren bis zum Beginn der Völkerwanderungszeit. Reallexikon der Germanischen Altertumskunde - Ergänzungsbände. Vol. 60. de Gruyter. doi:10.1515/9783110209976. ISBN 978-3-11-020034-8.
- Dilcher, Gerhard (2011). "Germanisches Recht". Handwörterbuch zur deutschen Rechtsgeschichte. Vol. 2 (2nd ed.). pp. 241–252.
- Drew, Katharine Fischer (1991). The Laws of the Salian Franks. University of Pennsylvania Press. doi:10.9783/9780812200508. ISBN 978-0-8122-8256-6.
- Dusil, Stephan; Kannowski, Bernd; Schwedler, Gerald (2023). "Chapter 2 Early Middle Ages (500–1100)". In Masferrer, Aniceto; van Rhee, C.H.; Donlan, Seán; Heesters, Cornelis (eds.). A Companion to Western Legal Traditions: From Antiquity to the Twentieth Century. Brill. pp. 77–160. doi:10.1163/9789004687257_004.
- Esders, Stefan (2021). "Chapter 1 Wergild and the Monetary Logic of Early Medieval Conflict Resolution". In Bothe, Lukas; Esders, Stefan; Nijdam, Han (eds.). Wergeld, Compensation and Penance: The Monetary Logic of Early Medieval Conflict Resolution. pp. 1–37. doi:10.1163/9789004466128_002.
- Fruscione, Daniela (2010). "On "Germanic"". The Heroic Age: A Journal of Medieval Northwestern Europe. 14.
- Goetz, Hans-Werner (2002). "Introduction". In Goetz, Hans-Werner; Jarnut, Jörg; Pohl, Walter (eds.). Regna and Gentes: The Relationship between Late Antique and Early Medieval Peoples and Kingdoms in the Transformation of the Roman World. Brill. pp. 1–11. doi:10.1163/9789047404255_004. ISBN 978-90-474-0425-5.
- Green, Dennis H. (1998). Language and History in the Early Germanic World (2001 ed.). Cambridge University Press. ISBN 978-0-521-79423-7.
- Hardt, Matthias (2010) [2006]. "Volksversammlung". Germanische Altertumskunde Online.
- Holzhauer, Heinz; Pesch, Alexandra (2010) [2002]. "Ordal". Germanische Altertumskunde Online.
- Hoppenbouwers, P. (2013). "Leges nationum and ethnic personality of law in Charlemagne's Empire". In Duindam, Jeroen; Harries, Jill Diana; Humfress, Caroline; Nimrod, Hurvitz (eds.). Law and Empire: Ideas, Practices, Actors. Brill. pp. 251–274. doi:10.1163/9789004249516_013. ISBN 978-90-04-24529-7.
- Kalb, Herbert (2016). "German Law". In Melville, Gert (ed.). Brill's Encyclopedia of the Middle Ages Online. Brill. doi:10.1163/2213-2139_bema_SIM_033749.
- Kalb, Herbert (2016a). "Court Procedure". In Melville, Gert (ed.). Brill's Encyclopedia of the Middle Ages Online. Brill. doi:10.1163/2213-2139_bema_SIM_033745.
- Karras, Ruth Mazo (2006). "The History of Marriage and the Myth of Friedelehe". Early Medieval Europe. 14 (2): 119–152. doi:10.1111/j.1468-0254.2006.00177.x. S2CID 162024433.
- Köbler, Gerhard (2010) [1986]. "Eidhelfer". Germanische Altertumskunde Online.
- Körntgen, Ludger (2010) [2000]. "Kompositionensysteme". Germanische Altertumskunde Online.
- Lenski, Noel (2022). "Slavery among the Visigoths". In de Wet, Chris; Kahlos, Maijastina; Vuolanto, Ville (eds.). Slavery in the Late Antique World, 200-700 CE. Cambridge University Press. pp. 251–280. doi:10.1017/9781108568159.014. ISBN 978-1-108-56815-9.
- Lenski, Noel (2023). "Law and Language in the Roman and Germanic Traditions: A Study of Liber Iudiciorum 6.4.3 and the Idea of iniuria in Visigothic Law". In Lorenzi, Carlo; Navarra, Maria Luisa (eds.). Atti dell'Accademia Romanistica Costantiniana, vol. XXV, La costruzione del testo giuridico tardoantico. ali&no editrice. pp. 355–427.
- Müller-Volbehr, Jörg (2010) [1975]. "Beweis". Germanische Altertumskunde Online.
- Munzel-Everling, Dietlinde (2008). "Eid". Handwörterbuch zur deutschen Rechtsgeschichte. Vol. 1. pp. 1249–1261.
- Oliver, Lisi (2011). The Body Legal in Barbarian Law. Toronto: University of Toronto. ISBN 978-0-8020-9706-4.
- Lück, Heiner (2010) [2003]. "Recht". Germanische Altertumskunde Online. pp. 418–447.
- Munske, Horst Haider (1973). Dürscheid, Christa; Gardt, Andreas; Sonderegger, Stefan; Reichmann, Oskar (eds.). Der germanische Rechtswortschatz im Bereich der Missetaten; philologische und sprachgeographische Untersuchungen. Berlin, New York: de Gruyter. doi:10.1515/9783110829488. ISBN 978-3-11-082948-8.
- Meineke, Eckard; Kaufmann, Ekkehard (2010) [1994]. "Fehde". Germanische Altertumskunde Online.
- Naumann, Hans-Peter; Schmidt-Wiegand, Ruth (2010) [2003]. "Rechtssprache". Germanische Altertumskunde Online.
- Pohl, Walter (2004). Die Germanen (2 ed.). R. Oldenbourg Verlag. ISBN 3-486-56755-1.
- Pohl, Walter (2016). "Gentile Systems". Brill's Encyclopedia of the Middle Ages Online. Brill. doi:10.1163/2213-2139_bema_SIM_033730.
- Saar, Stefan Christian; Strauch, Dieter (2010) [2005]. "Sippe". Germanische Altertumskunde Online. de Gruyter.
- Schmidt-Wiegand, Ruth (2010a) [2001]. "Leges". Germanische Altertumskunde Online. pp. 419–447.
- Schmidt-Wiegand, Ruth (2010b) [2003]. "Volksrechte". Germanische Altertumskunde Online.
- Schmidt-Wiegand, Ruth (2010d) [1994]. "Ēwa". Germanische Altertumskunde Online.
- Schmidt-Wiegand, Ruth (2010e) [2006]. "Wergeld". Germanische Altertumskunde Online.
- Schulze, Reiner (2010) [1986]. "Eherecht". Germanische Altertumskunde Online. pp. 961–999.
- Schumann, Eva (2008a). "Friedelehe". Handwörterbuch zur deutschen Rechtsgeschichte. Vol. 1 (2nd ed.). pp. 1805–1807.
- Schumann, Eva (2008b). "Kebsehe, Kebskind". Handwörterbuch zur deutschen Rechtsgeschichte. Vol. 1 (2nd ed.). pp. 1695–1697.
- Seebold, Elmar; Schneider, Reinhard (2010) [2000]. "König und Königtum". Germanische Altertumskunde Online. de Gruyter.
- Shoemaker, Karl (2018). "Germanic Law". In Heikki Pihlajamäki; Markus D. Dubber; Mark Godfrey (eds.). The Oxford Handbook of European Legal History. Oxford University Press. pp. 249–263. doi:10.1093/oxfordhb/9780198785521.013.11. ISBN 978-0-19-878552-1.
- Springer, Matthias; Steuer, Heiko (2010) [2005]. "Stamm und Staat". Germanische Altertumskunde Online. de Gruyter.
- Timpe, Dieter; Scardigli, Barbara; et al. (2010) [1998]. "Germanen, Germania, Germanische Altertumskunde". Germanische Altertumskunde Online. pp. 363–876.
- von Olberg, G. (1991). Die Bezeichnungen für soziale Stände, Schichten und Gruppen in den Leges Barbarorum. Berlin, New York: de Gruyter. doi:10.1515/9783110850062. ISBN 978-3-11-085006-2.
- Wauters, Bart; de Benito, Marco (2017). "Chapter 2: The early middle ages". The History of Law in Europe: An Introduction. Elgar. pp. 31–43. doi:10.4337/9781786430762. ISBN 978-1-78643-076-2.
- Weitzel, Jürgen (2008). "Eideshelfer". Handwörterbuch zur deutschen Rechtsgeschichte. Vol. 1 (2 ed.). pp. 1261–1263.
- Wormald, C. Patrick (2002). "The 'leges barbarorum': Law and ethnicity in the post-Roman West". In Goetz, Hans-Werner; Jarnut, Jan; Pohl, Walter (eds.). Regna and gentes. The relationship between late antique and early medieval peoples and kingdoms in the transformation of the Roman world. Leiden: Brill. pp. 21–53. doi:10.1163/9789047404255_006. ISBN 978-90-474-0425-5.
