= Karl von Amira =

German legal historian (1848–1930)

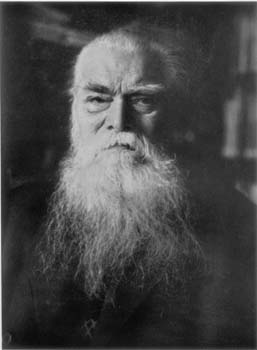
- Born: 8 March 1848; Aschaffenburg, Germany
- Died: 22 June 1930 (aged 82); Munich, Germany
- Awards: Bavarian Maximilian Order for Science and Art (1902)

Academic background
- Education: Ludwig-Maximilians-Universität München
- Academic advisors: Bernhard Windscheid; Paul von Roth; Alois von Brinz

Academic work
- Discipline: Jurisprudence; Germanic studies
- Sub-discipline: Constitutional law; Legal history
- Institutions: University of Freiburg; Ludwig-Maximilians-Universität München
- Notable students: Claudius von Schwerin; Eberhard von Künßberg
- Main interests: Early Germanic law

Karl Konrad Ferdinand Maria von Amira (8 March 1848 – 22 June 1930) was a German jurist who served as Professor of Constitutional Law at the Ludwig-Maximilians-Universität München. He was a known expert on early Germanic law.

== Biography ==
Karl von Amira was born in Aschaffenburg, Germany on 8 March 1848. Gaining his abitur at the Wilhelmsgymnasium in Munich, von Amira studied law at the Ludwig-Maximilians-Universität München. Among his teachers were Bernhard Windscheid, Julius Wilhelm von Planck, Paul von Roth and Alois von Brinz. He also studied North Germanic languages under Konrad Maurer. In 1872, von Amira obtained his Ph.D. in Munich under the supervision of Maurer.

From 1875 to 1892, von Amira was Professor of German and Church Law at the University of Freiburg. Since 1892, von Amira was Professor of Constitutional Law at the Ludwig-Maximilians-Universität München. Von Amira specialized in the study of Early Germanic law and Medieval Roman law. He was instrumental in the publishing of the Deutsches Rechtswörterbuch. Among his students were Claudius von Schwerin and Eberhard von Künßberg. von Amira was a member of many learned societies, including the Bavarian Academy of Sciences and Humanities (since 1901), the Royal Society of Sciences in Uppsala (since 1887), the Royal Society of Arts and Sciences in Gothenburg (since 1891), the Royal Swedish Academy of Sciences (since 1905), the Prussian Academy of Sciences (1900), the Göttingen Academy of Sciences and Humanities (1922) and the Saxon Academy of Sciences and Humanities (since 1929). He received the Bavarian Maximilian Order for Science and Art in 1902.

== Selected works ==
- Das altnorwegische Vollstreckungsverfahren: Eine rechtsgeschichtliche Abhandlung. München 1874.
- Erbenfolge und Verwandtschaftsgliederung nach den alt-niederdeutschen Rechten. Ackermann, München 1874 (Digitalisat).
- Ueber Zweck und Mittel der germanischen Rechtsgeschichte. Akademische Antrittsrede. Ackermann, München 1876 (Digitalisat).
- Das Endinger Judenspiel (Herausgeberschaft). Halle 1883 (Digitalisat; DjVu).
- Thierstrafen und Thierprocesse. In: Mittheilungen des Instituts für österreichische Geschichtsforschung. 11. Band, 1891, S. 545–601. Separatdruck: Innsbruck 1891 (Digitalisat; PDF).
- Die Dresdner Bilderhandschrift des Sachsenspiegels. Erster Band: Facsimile der Handschrift. Leipzig 1902. Zweiter Band: Erläuterungen. Teil I, Leipzig 1925 und Teil II, Leipzig 1926.
- Die Handgebärden in den Bilderhandschriften des Sachsenspiegels (= Abhandlungen der Bayerischen Akademie der Wissenschaften. Philosophisch-Philologische und Historische Klasse; Bd. 23, 2). München 1905.
- Der Stab in der germanischen Rechtssymbolik (= Abhandlungen der Bayerischen Akademie der Wissenschaften. Philosophisch-Philologische und Historische Klasse; Band 25, 1). München 1909 (Rezension in der ZRG).
- Grundriß des germanischen Rechts (= Grundriß der Germanischen Philologie. Band 5). 3. Auflage. Strassburg 1913.
- Die Neubauersche Chronik (= Sitzungsberichte der Königlichen Bayerischen Akademie der Wissenschaften. Philosophisch-philologische und historische Klasse; Jg. 1918, 9). München 1918 (Digitalisat; DjVu).
- Die germanischen Todesstrafen. Untersuchungen zur Rechts- und Religionsgeschichte (= Abhandlungen der Bayerischen Akademie der Wissenschaften. Philosophisch-philologische und Historische Klasse; Bd. 31, 3). München 1922.
- Rechtsarchäologie. 1. Einführung in die Rechtsarchäologie. Gegenstände, Formen und Symbole germanischen Rechts. Berlin 1943 (Digitalisat).

== Sources ==
- Paul Puntschart: Karl von Amira und sein Werk. Böhlau, Weimar 1932.
- Hans Liermann (1953). "Karl von Amira". Neue Deutsche Biographie (in German). Vol. 1. Berlin: Duncker & Humblot. pp. 249–249. (full text online).
- Peter Landau, Hermann Nehlsen, Mathias Schmoeckel (Hrsg.): Karl von Amira zum Gedächtnis (= Rechtshistorische Reihe, Band 206), Lang, Frankfurt am Main u. a. 1999, ISBN 3-631-35425-8.
- Gerhard J. Bellinger, Brigitte Regler-Bellinger: Schwabings Ainmillerstrasse und ihre bedeutendsten Anwohner. Ein repräsentatives Beispiel der Münchner Stadtgeschichte von 1888 bis heute. Norderstedt 2003, S. 139–140, ISBN 3-8330-0747-8; 2. Aufl. 2012, ISBN 978-3-8482-2883-6; E-Book 2013, ISBN 978-3-8482-6264-9.
- Mathias Schmoeckel: Amira, Karl von (1848–1930). In: Albrecht Cordes, Heiner Lück, Dieter Werkmüller, Ruth Schmidt-Wiegand (Hrsg.): Handwörterbuch zur deutschen Rechtsgeschichte, 2., völlig überarbeitete und erweiterte Auflage, Band 1, Erich Schmidt Verlag, Berlin 2008, ISBN 978-3-503-07912-4, Sp. 200–202 (online, kostenpflichtig).
- Hermann Nehlsen: Karl von Amira (1848–1930). In: Katharina Weigand (Hrsg.): Münchner Historiker zwischen Politik und Wissenschaft. Utz, München 2010, ISBN 978-3-8316-0969-7, S. 137–158.
