= Visigothic Code =

Set of laws used in the Visigothic Kingdom

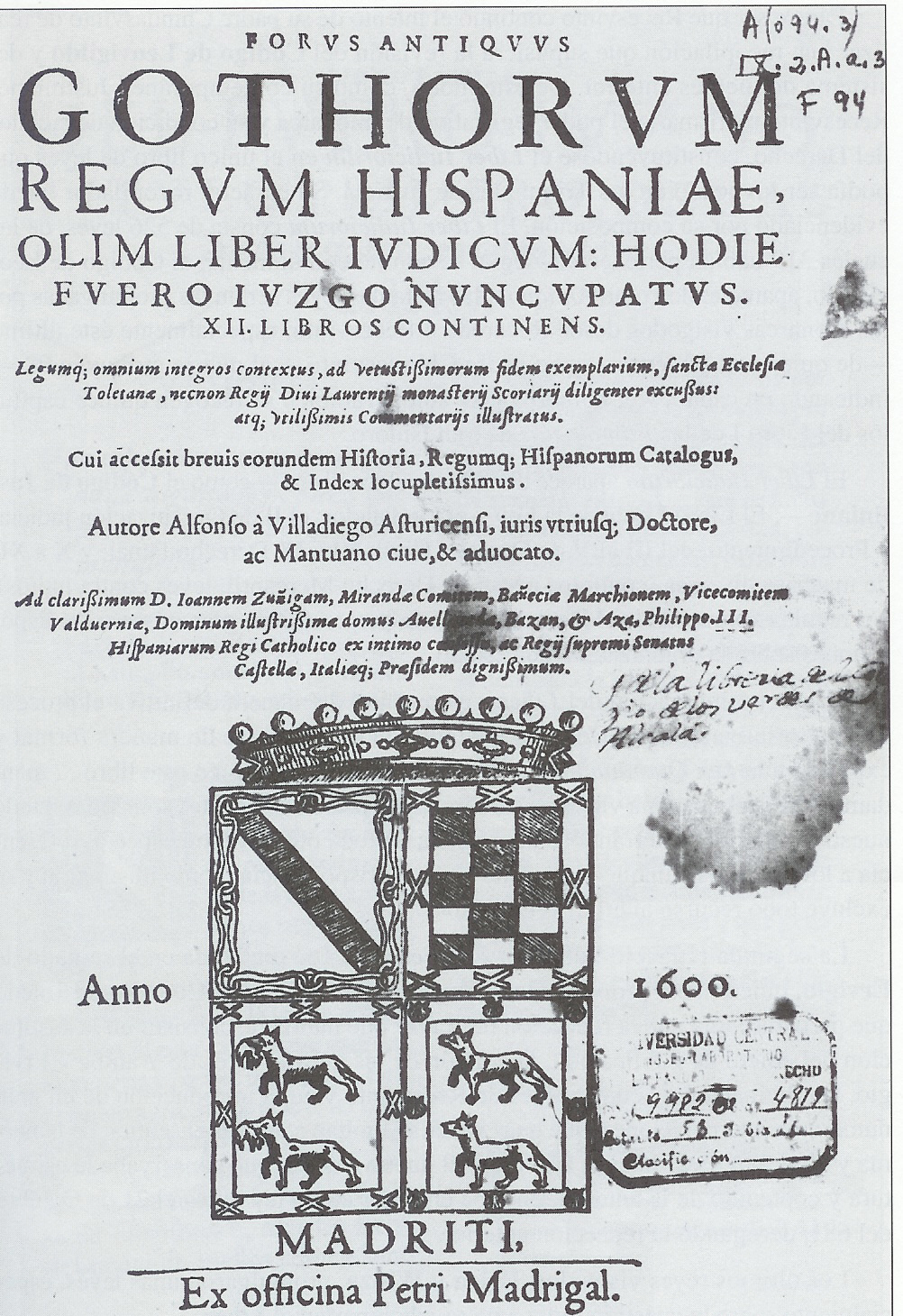
The cover of an edition of the Liber Iudiciorum from 1600.

The Visigothic Code (Latin: Forum Iudicum, Liber Iudiciorum, or Book of the Judgements; Spanish: Fuero Juzgo), also called Lex Visigothorum (English: Law of the Visigoths), is a set of laws begun by king Chindasuinth (642–653 AD) of the Visigothic Kingdom in his second year of rule (642–643) that sought to provide common legal status between his Visigothic and Spanish-Roman subjects. In 654 his son, king Recceswinth (649–672; sole ruler from 653 to 672), published the enlarged law code, which was the first law code that applied equally to the conquering Goths and the general population, of which the majority had Roman roots, and had lived under Roman laws.

The code abolished the old tradition of having different laws for Romans (leges romanae) and Visigoths (leges barbarorum), and under it all the subjects of the Visigothic kingdom would stop being romani and gothi instead becoming hispani. In this way, all subjects of the kingdom were gathered under the same jurisdiction, eliminating social and legal differences, and allowing greater assimilation of the populations. The Code "fused Roman law and Germanic law and was binding on both [Visigothic and Spanish-Roman] populations." The Code also enshrined much law regarding the Catholic Church, probably "imparted to it by the Council of Toledo of 447". Unfortunately, according to translator S.P. Scott, the code was written in "monkish Latin, a barbarous jargon, extremely difficult to translate, and vastly different from the polished idiom of Tacitus and Cicero".

== The first law codes ==
During the first centuries of Visigothic rule, Romans were ruled by different laws than Goths were. The earliest known Visigothic laws are the Code of Euric, which were compiled by roughly 480 A.D. The first written laws of the Visigothic kingdom were compiled during the rule of king Alaric II and were meant to regulate the lives of Romans, who made up the majority of the kingdom and were based on the existing Roman imperial laws and their interpretations. The Breviarium (Breviary of Alaric) was promulgated during the meeting of Visigothic nobles in Toulouse on February 2, 506.

During the reign of King Leovigild an attempt was made to unite the laws regulating the lives of Goths and those who had previously been Roman subjects, into a revised law code, Codex Revisus. In 589, at the Third Council of Toledo, the ruling Visigoths and Suebi, who had long practiced Arianism, converted to Latin Catholicism. Now that the formerly Roman population and the Goths shared the same faith, King Reccared issued laws that equally applied to both populations.

== Visigothic code ==
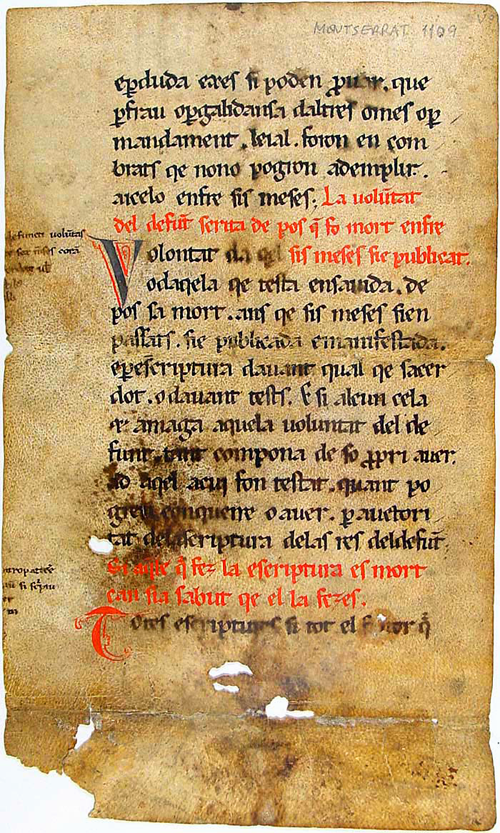
Fragment of an 11th-century Liber Judiciorum translation to the old Occitan language. Guarded at Santa Maria of Montserrat Abbey on the Montserrat mountain, Catalonia, Spain.

The code of 654 was enlarged by the novel legislation of Recceswinth (for which reason it is sometimes called the Code of Recceswinth) and later kings Wamba, Erwig, Egica, and perhaps Wittiza. Recceswinth's code was edited by Braulio of Zaragoza, since Chindasuinth's original code had been hastily written and promulgated.

During the Twelfth Council of Toledo in 681, King Erwig asked that the law code be clarified and revised. Some new laws were added, out of which 28 dealt with Jews.

The laws were far-reaching and long in effect: in 10th-century Galicia, monastic charters make reference to the Code. The laws govern and sanction family life and by extension political life: marriage, the transmission of property to heirs, safeguarding the rights of widows and orphans. Particularly with the Visigoth's Law Codes, women could inherit land and title, were allowed to manage land independently from their husbands or male relations, dispose of their property in legal wills if they had no heirs, could represent themselves and bear witness in court by age 14 and arrange for their own marriages by age 20.

The laws combined the Catholic Church's Canon law, and as such have a strongly theocratic tone.

The code is known to have been preserved by the Moors, as Christians were permitted the use of their own laws, where they did not conflict with those of the conquerors, upon the regular payment of jizya tribute. Thus it may be presumed that it was the recognized legal authority of Christian magistrates while the Iberian Peninsula remained under Muslim control. When Ferdinand III of Castile took Córdoba in the thirteenth century, he ordered that the code be adopted and observed by his subjects, and had it translated, albeit inaccurately, into the Spanish language, as the Fuero Juzgo. The Occitan language translation of this document, Llibre Jutge, is among the oldest literary texts in that language (c. 1050). In 1910 an English translation of the code by Samuel Parsons Scott was published, but it received severe criticism.

== Contents ==
The following is a list of the books and titles which form the Visigothic Code.

- Book I: Concerning Legal Agencies
  - Title I: The Lawmaker
  - Title II: The Law
- Book II: Concerning the Conduct of Causes
  - Title I: Concerning Judges, and Matters to be Decided in Court
  - Title II: Concerning Causes
  - Title III: Concerning Constituents and Commissions
  - Title IV: Concerning Witnesses and Evidence
  - Title V: Concerning Valid and Invalid Documents and How Wills Should be Drawn Up
- Book III: Concerning Marriage
  - Title I: Concerning Nuptial Contracts
  - Title II: Concerning Unlawful Marriages
  - Title III: Concerning the Rape of Virgins, or Widows
  - Title IV: Concerning Adultery
  - Title V: Concerning Incest, Apostasy, and Pederasty
  - Title VI: Concerning Divorce, and the Separation of Persons who have been Betrothed
- Book IV: Concerning Natural Lineage
  - Title I: Concerning the Degrees of Relationship
  - Title II: Concerning the Laws of Inheritance
  - Title III: Concerning Wards and Their Guardians
  - Title IV: Concerning Foundlings
  - Title V: Concerning Such Property as is Vested by the Laws of Nature
- Book V: Concerning Business Transactions
  - Title I: Ecclesiastical Affairs
  - Title II: Concerning Donations in General
  - Title III: Concerning the Gifts of Patrons
  - Title IV: Concerning Exchanges and Sales
  - Title V: Concerning Property Committed to the Charge of, or Loaned to, Another
  - Title VI: Concerning Pledges and Debts
  - Title VII: Concerning the Liberation of Slaves, and Freedmen
- Book VI: Concerning Crimes and Tortures
  - Title I: Concerning the Accusers of Criminals
  - Title II: Concerning Malefactors and their Advisors, and Poisoners
  - Title III: Concerning Abortion
  - Title IV: Concerning Injuries, Wounds, and Mutilations, Inflicted upon Men
  - Title V: Concerning Homicide
- Book VII: Concerning Theft and Fraud
  - Title I: Concerning Informers of Theft
  - Title II: Concerning Thieves and Stolen Property
  - Title III: Concerning Appropriators and Kidnappers of Slaves
  - Title IV: Concerning Custody and Sentencing
  - Title V: Concerning Forgers of Documents
  - Title VI: Concerning Counterfeiters of Metals
- Book VIII: Concerning Acts of Violence and Injuries
  - Title I: Concerning Attacks, and Plunder of Property
  - Title II: Concerning Arson and Incendiaries
  - Title III: Concerning injuries to Trees, Gardens, or Growing Crops of any Description
  - Title IV: Concerning Injury to Animals, and Other Property
  - Title V: Concerning the Pasturage of Hogs and Concerning Strays
  - Title VI: Concerning Bees, and the Damage They Cause
- Book IX: Concerning Fugitives and Refugees
  - Title I: Concerning Fugitives, and Those who Conceal, and Assist Them in Their Flight
  - Title II: Concerning Those who Refuse to go to War, and Deserters
  - Title III: Concerning Those who Seek Sanctuary in a Church
- Book X: Concerning Partition, Limitation, and Boundaries
  - Title I: Concerning Partition, and Lands Conveyed by Contract
  - Title II: Concerning the Limitations of Fifty and Thirty Years
  - Title III: Concerning Boundaries and Landmarks
- Book XI: Concerning the Sick and the Dead and Merchants who Come from Beyond
  - Title I: Concerning Physicians and Sick Persons
  - Title II: Concerning Those who Disturb Sepulchres
  - Title III: Concerning Merchants who Come from Beyond Seas
- Book XII: Concerning the Prevention of Official Oppression, and the Thorough Extinction of Heretical Sects
  - Title I: Concerning the Exercise of Moderation in Judicial Decisions, and the Avoiding of Oppression by Those Invested with Authority
  - Title II: Concerning the Eradication of the Errors of all Heretics and Jews
  - Title III: Concerning New Laws against the Jews, in which Old Ones are Confirmed, and New Ones are Added

== See also ==
- Code of Euric
- Early Germanic law
- Fuero Juzgo
- Salic law
- Code (law)

== Sources ==
- King, P. D. "King Chindasvind and the First Territorial Law-code of the Visigothic Kingdom." in Visigothic Spain: New Approaches. ed. Edward James. Oxford: Clarendon Press, 1980. pp 131–157.
- Lear, Floyd Seyward (1951). "The Public Law of the Visigothic Code". Speculum. 26 (1): 1–23. doi:10.2307/2852081. ISSN 0038-7134. JSTOR 2852081.
