= Ordenamiento de Alcalá =

Legal code

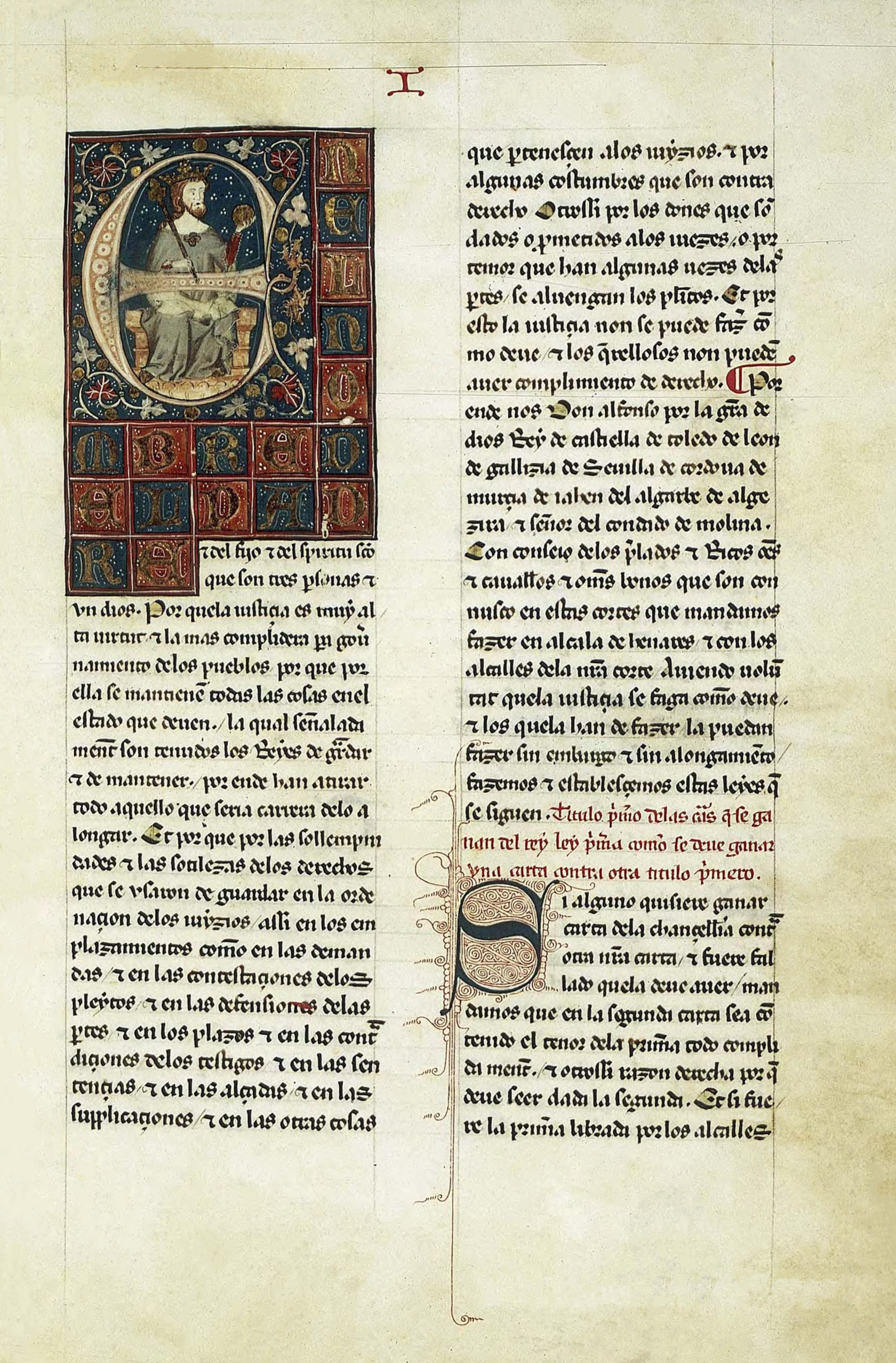
First page of the Ordenamiento de Alcalá.

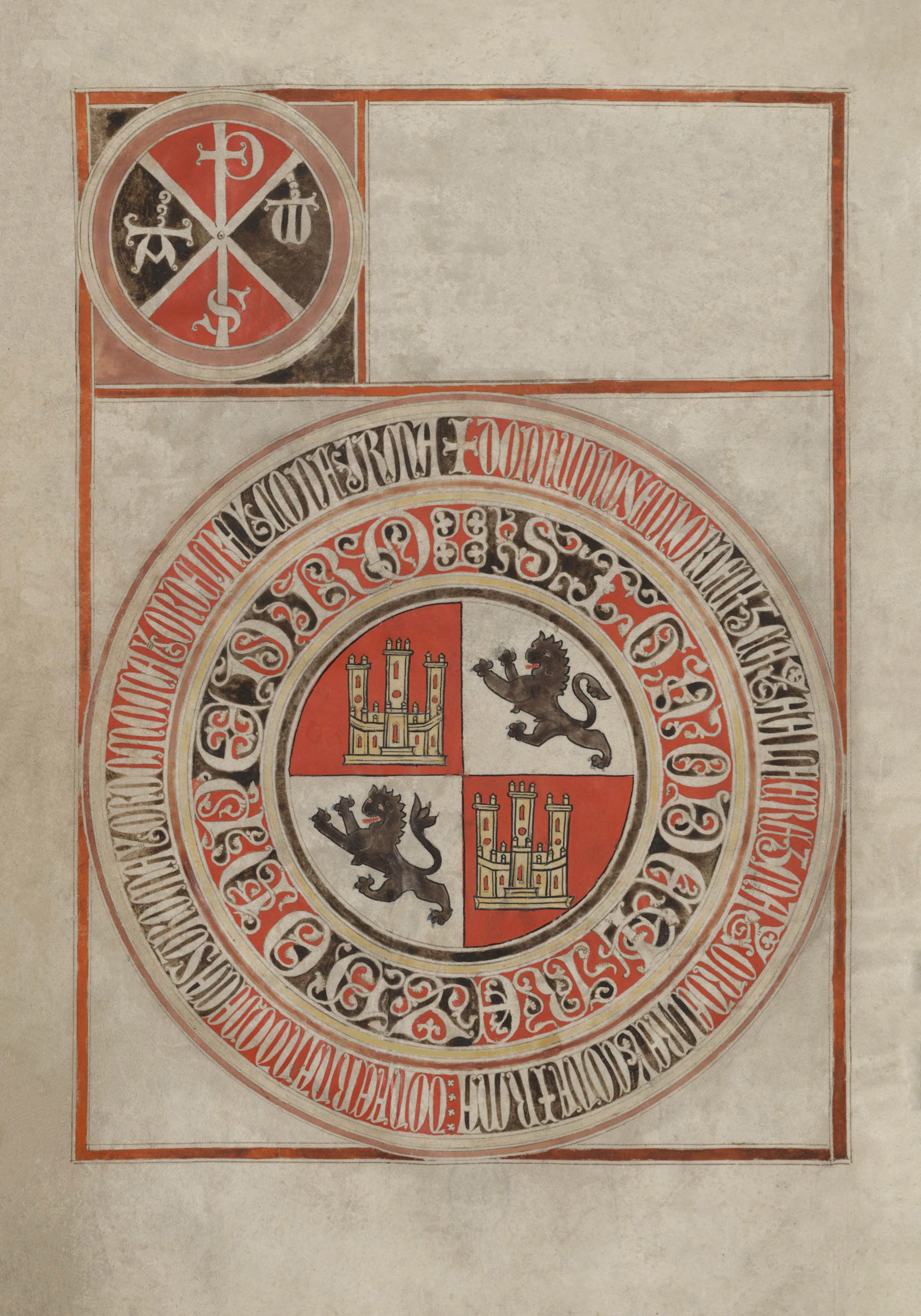
Royal stamps.

The Ordenamiento de Alcalá is a collection of 58 laws enacted by the courts of Alfonso XI in Alcalá de Henares in 1348. They are an important part of the principal legislative body of the Castilian Crown during the low Middle Ages until the 1505 Leyes de Toro.

This work represented the success of the lawyers (who had training in Roman law), who represented the interests of the king to increase the power of the monarchy (with the goal of creating an early absolute monarchy). The creation of a normative body that would straighten up the legal situation was needed due to the dispersion of laws and many undefined jurisdictional situations (local and estates).

== Contents ==
Besides new laws on fines (in the regulation of those laws was included many detailed questions, for example, regarding contracts and wills), it established a legal order of precedence for the application of different existing legislative bodies. In this manner it was established that they should apply disciplinary laws in Alcalá, that the Fuero Juzgo and the local fueros or estates were kept in place, and the Código de las Siete Partidas. Finally in cases of doubt or silence from the king the nobles would give their interpretation.

== Application ==
The Ordenamiento de Alcalá was applied to areas with local fueros, like Sahagún, Cuenca, Castile and León, that gradually would adopt the Fuero Real that was given to them.

However, the king had to yield to pressure from the nobles who wished to see recognized different land concessions and privileges during the continued revolutions and civil wars of the Middle Ages, especially in the turbulent years under the regency of his grandmother María de Molina, during his years as a minor and those of his father Fernando IV.

The nobles argued precedents in an assembly in Nájera with Alfonso VII in 1138, and finally obtained fiscal and judicial privileges, to conserve the lands under lordship determined conditions, and above all to become established as ricoshombres, powerful nobles that already distinguished themselves clearly from the nobles caballeros, or knightly nobles and of course the rest of the free men.

As time passed they clearly distinguished themselves in the Crown of Castile the royal lands, under royal jurisdiction, and of the lords, under lordly jurisdiction (of a lay or ecclesiastic nobles).

The terms in the Ordenamiento de Alcalá were in force for a long time. It can be seen that orders fixed in this law were incorporated later in compilations of the Modern Age; being faithfully maintained until the enactment of the Código Civil at the end of the 19th century.
