= Martin Lintzel =

German historian (1901–1955)

Martin Lintzel (1901–1955) was a German historian, specialising on medieval German history. He studied at the University of Halle during 1919–1925, under Albert Werminghoff. His dissertation on the medieval institution of the Hoftage was published in 1924, supervised by Robert Holtzmann. He was a lecturer at Halle from 1931. In March 1935, he was elected as professor for medieval and modern history at the University of Kiel, but was sent back to Halle in 1936, following a political dispute with the National Socialist press and student organisations in Kiel. He entered military service for two months during 1944, but was discharged due to suffering from depression. He continued to lecture at Halle until 1953, when he once again began to suffer from severe depression following the suicide of a friend and the death of his wife. He committed suicide two years later.

Lintzel was a member of the Saxon Academy of Sciences, the German Academy of Sciences at Berlin and the Göttingen Academy of Sciences and Humanities.

== Bibliography ==
- 1924. Die Beschlüsse der deutschen Hoftage von 911 bis 1056
- 1933. Die Stände der deutschen Volksrechte, hauptsächlich der Lex Saxonum
- 1933. Studien über Liudprand von Cremona
- 1933. Der sächsische Stammesstaat und seine Eroberung durch die Franken
- 1935. Karl der Große und Widukind
- 1937. Die Germanen auf deutschem Boden. Von der Völkerwanderung bis zum ersten Reich
- 1943. Die Kaiserpolitik Ottos des Grossen
- 1952. Die Entstehung des Kurfürstenkollegs
- 1953. Miszellen zur Geschichte des zehnten Jahrhunderts
