= Fuero Juzgo =

Historic Spanish legal code

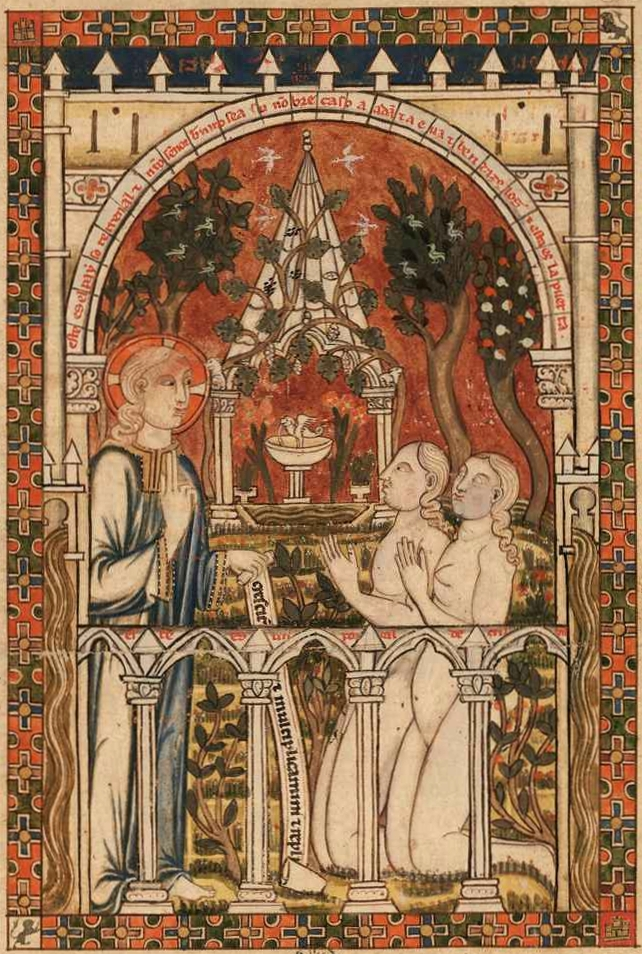

The Fuero Juzgo (Spanish pronunciation: [ˈfweɾo ˈxuθɣo]) was a codex of Spanish laws enacted in Castile in 1241 by Fernando III. It is essentially a translation of the Liber Iudiciorum that was formulated in 654 by the Visigoths.

The Fuero Juzgo was first applied legally as a fuero local in several kingdoms in the middle of the Iberian Peninsula that Castile slowly reconquered from Muslim rulers. The first known reference to the Fuero Juzgo in law was seen in Córdoba. In 1348, the Ordenamiento de Alcalá granted it legal preeminence over the Siete Partidas. The Fuero Juzgo reigned until the creation of the Spanish Civil Code near the end of the nineteenth century. Presently, it retains some legal force with respect to certain auxiliary civil fueros in the Basque Country, Navarra, and Aragon.
