= Lex Baiuvariorum =

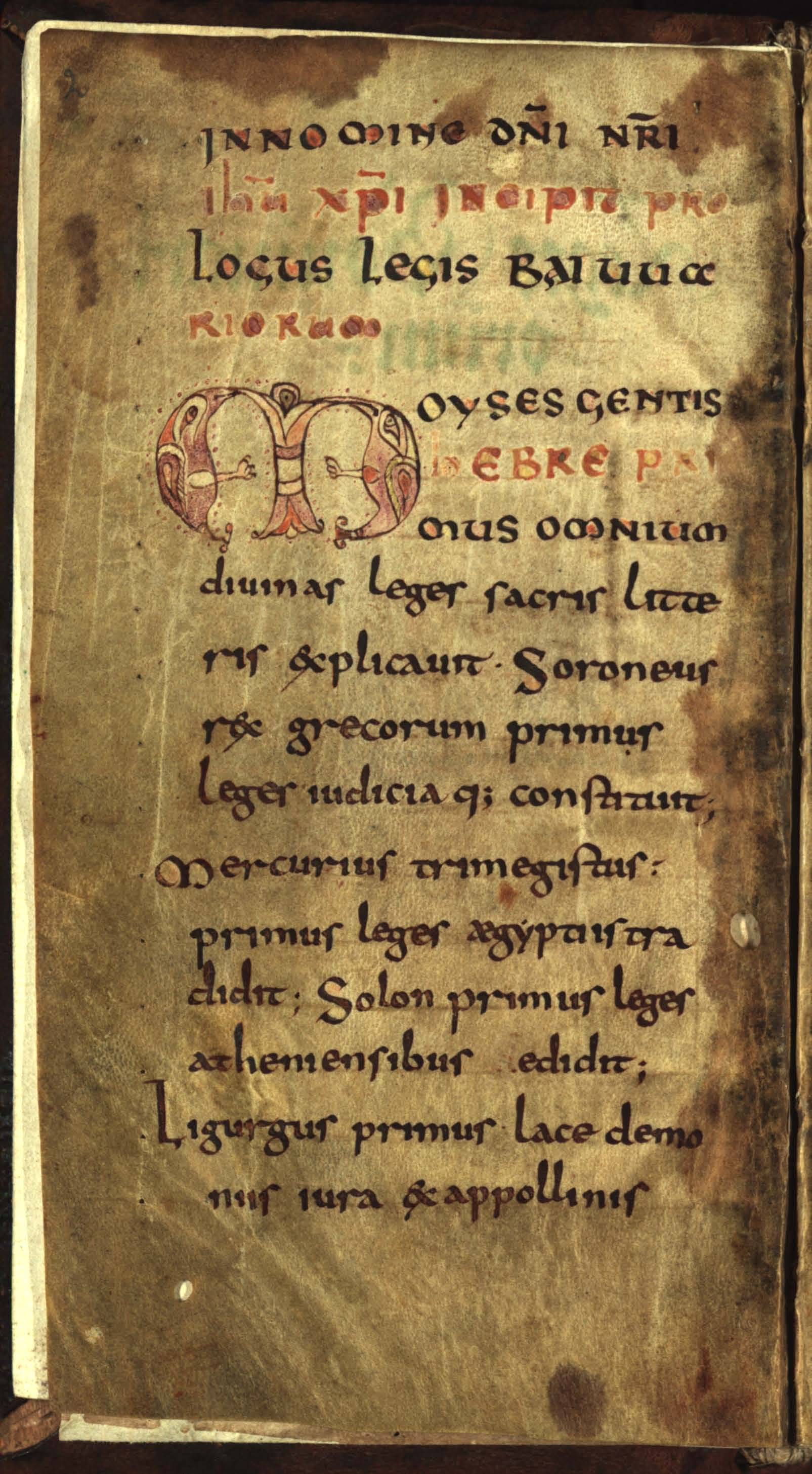
Lex Baiuvariorum, early ninth-century manuscript, University Library Munich

The Lex Baiuvariorum was a collection of the tribal laws of the Bavarii of the sixth through eighth centuries. The first compilation was edited by Eberswind, first abbot of Niederaltaich, in 741 or 743. Duke Odilo, founder supplemented the code around 748. It is one of the most well documented bodies of Germanic tribal law.

Parts of the Lex Baiuvariorum are identical with the Visigothic Code of Euric and from the Lex Alamannorum. The Bavarian law, therefore, is later than that of the Alamanni. It dates unquestionably from a period when the Frankish authority was very strong in Bavaria, when the dukes were vassals of the Frankish kings. Immediately after the revolt of Bavaria in 743, the Bavarian Duke Odilo was forced to submit to Pippin the Younger and Carloman, the sons of Charles Martel, and to recognize the Frankish suzerainty. About the same period, too, the church of Bavaria was organized by St Boniface, and the country divided into several bishoprics; and we find frequent references to these bishops (in the plural) in the law of the Bavarians. On the other hand, we know that the law is anterior to the reign of Duke Tassilo III (749-788). The date of compilation must, therefore, be placed between 743 and 749.

Wilhelm Störmer claims that though the Lex Baiuvariorum uses some identical titles as Visigothic and Alamani texts, synodal texts and the Tradition Book of Freising indicate that it cannot simply be a copy. K. Reindels claims that the law could have been developed in stages, starting with the reign of Theudebert I (539–548) until we have the version that we know today created during the reign of Odillo. What is certain is that the Lex Baiuvariorum was created at the behest of the Frankish overlords.

The Lex Baiuvariorum consists mostly of individual acts the penalty in cash to be paid to the victim or the victim's family as well as the public treasury. Many of the extant manuscripts are in a small format, a clear indication that the lawbook was at hand when the lord held court. The text is written in Latin.

The Lex Baiuvariorum is divided into 23 titles. Titles 1–6 regulate the law of the different social ranks. Titles 7-23 offer legal rulings on criminal and private law.

- Title I: Protection of the church, spiritual men, its people and property including servants and wards.
- Title II: Protection of the duke, his office, and his military operations.
- Title III: Stipulates the Agilolfings as the leading noble family from which the rulers of Bavaria are chosen. The other noble families explicitly mentioned are: Anniona, Fagana, Hahilinga, Huosi and Trozza (sometimes also spelled "Drozza").
- Title IV: The protection of the free. Under free, the Lex Baiuvariorum makes a distinction between those who are free and those who have been set free. Fines for breaking the law varies depending on the status of the individuals involved: free, set free, and unfree.
- Title VIII: On Women and their Legal Causes that often occur. First and foremost, addresses the fines and instances of justified homicide incidental to acts of female (free or bonded) infidelity and adulterous acts. Addresses, too, fines incurred by male (free or bonded) misconduct and molestation of women

In full, the different titles were ordered as follows:

- 1. about the clergy or of church law
- 2. about the Duke and the legal cases that concern him
- 3. about the sexes and their penance
- 4. about the free, as they are atoned for
- 5. about freedmen, how they should be repaid
- 6. about servants, how they should be repaid
- 7. about the prohibition of incestuous marriages
- 8. about women and their legal cases, as they often happen
- 9. about theft
- 10. about arson to houses
- 11. about outrage
- 12. about destroyed boundary signs
- 13. about pawns
- 14. about harmful animals
- 15. about entrusted [and borrowed] things
- 16. about sales
- 17. about witnesses
- 18. about fighters
- 19. about the dead and what concerns them
- 20. about dogs and their penance
- 21. about hawks and birds
- 22. about orchards, forests and bees
- 23. about pigs

The laws remained in effect until 1180. The oldest manuscript dates from around 800 and is in the possession of the library of LMU Munich.

== Sources ==
- Fosberry, John trans, Criminal Justice through the Ages, English trans. John Fosberry. Mittelalterliches Kriminalmuseum, Rothenburg ob der Tauber, (1990 Eng. trans. 1993)
- Merzbacher, Friedrich, "History of German Law Making", Criminal Justice Through the Ages, Mittelalterliches Kriminalmuseum, Rothenburg ob der Taube, Druckerei Schulist, Heilbronn, 1981
- Störmer, Wilhelm. Die Baiuwaren: Von der Völkerwanderung bis Tassilo III. pp 49 – 53. Verlag C.H. Beck, 2002, ISBN 3-406-47981-2.
