= Code of Leovigild =

Visigothic legal code

The Code of Leovigild or Codex Revisus was a Visigothic legal code, a revision of the Codex Euricianus made in the late sixth century under Leovigild (568–586). The code does not survive and all we know of it is derived from the writings of Isidore of Seville, a near contemporary ecclesiastic and encyclopaedist. Nevertheless, it was the Gothic basis of the later Liber Iudiciorum, an Hispanian law code which united it with the law code of the Hispano-Roman population, the Breviary of Alaric.

In 1974, García Gallo made a critical examination of the evidence for the code and came to reject the claim of Isidore that Leovigild had formulated a new code, since the laws of Chindasuinth dictated modifications to laws more ancient the reign of Leovigild.
