= Code of Euric =

Set of Germanic laws

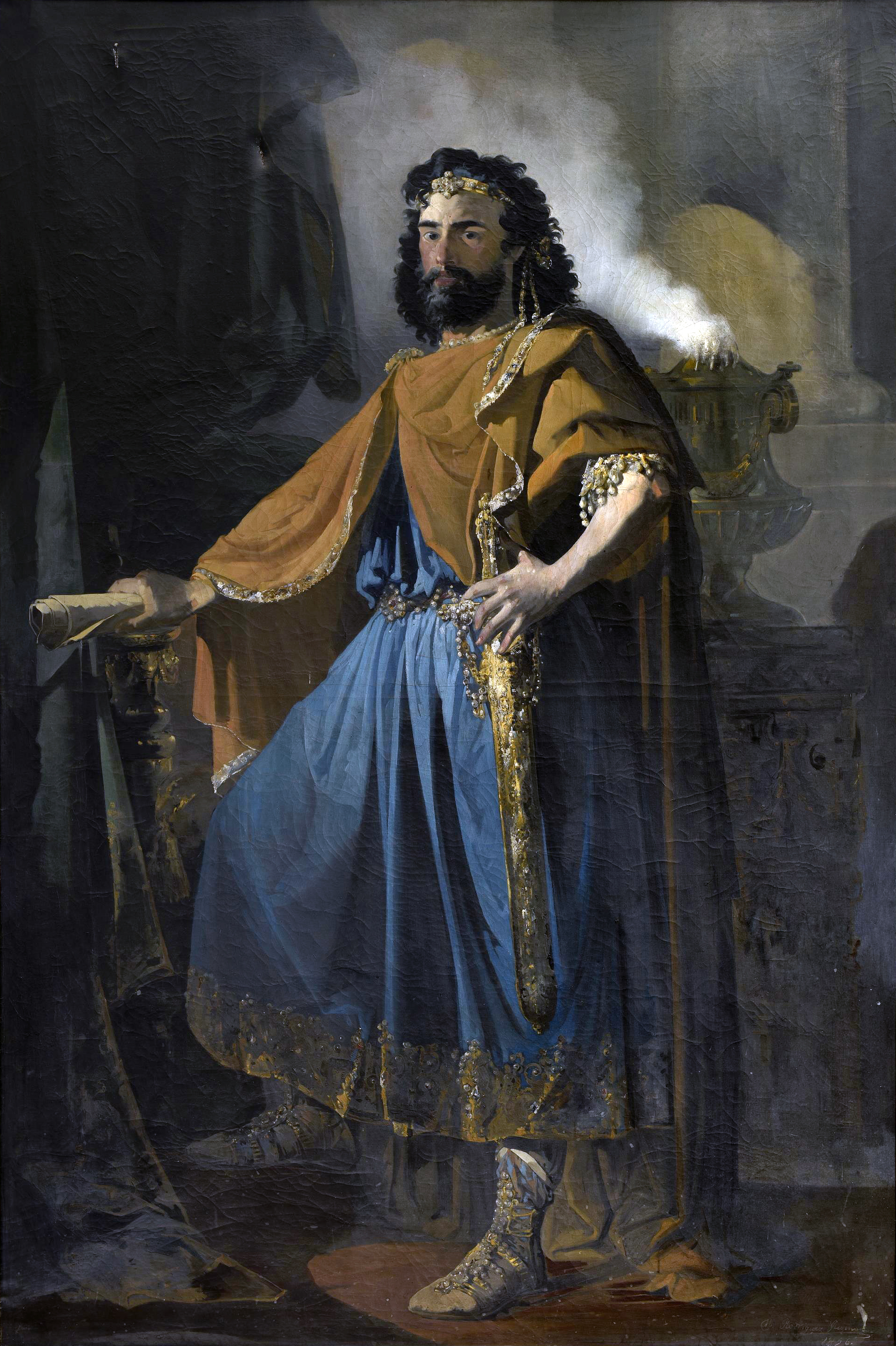
Imaginary portrait of Euric by Manuel Rodríguez de Guzmán (1855)

The Codex Euricianus or Code of Euric was a collection of laws governing the Visigoths compiled at the order of Euric, King of the Visigoths, sometime before 480, probably at Toulouse (possibly at Arles); it is one of the earliest examples of early Germanic law. The compilation itself was the work of Leo, a Roman lawyer and principal counsellor of the king. The customs of the Visigothic nation were recognised and affirmed. The Code is largely confused and it appears that it was merely a recollection of Gothic custom altered by Roman law.

The code entrenches a clear stratification of Gothic and Gallo-Roman society. There is the class of lords, who are called either domini or patroni depending on whether they were lords of slaves or freemen, and there are two classes of freemen who have lords above them: the buccellarii and the saiones. The Code was the first legal recognition of the buccellariatus, an office which the Roman Emperors were trying to ban. The buccellarii were a knightly class; they could change lords, but they had to return all the landed benefices they had received from their former lord.

The Codex Euricianus contains, among other things, provisions governing border disputes and, in particular, issues arising from the division of land between the settled Gothic conquerors and the Romanesque landowners, as well as provisions for lending, purchase and donation, marriage and succession. He is acknowledged in research as a pioneering legislative achievement for the Germanic codifications. The work is written in good Latin; in his writing Roman lawyers must have had a significant share. Controversial is the proportion of Germanic and Roman legal concepts; It is undisputed that the proportion of Roman law dominates. In the first place, the legal texts derive from the classical law of the vulgar Paulussentenzen, which was written at the turn of the 3rd to the 4th century, and shortened excerpt from the Institutiones of Gaius as well as excerpts from the Constitutions of Roman Emperors. Thus, the Codex Euricianus is also evidence of the advanced Romanization of the Visigoths.

== Further legislation ==
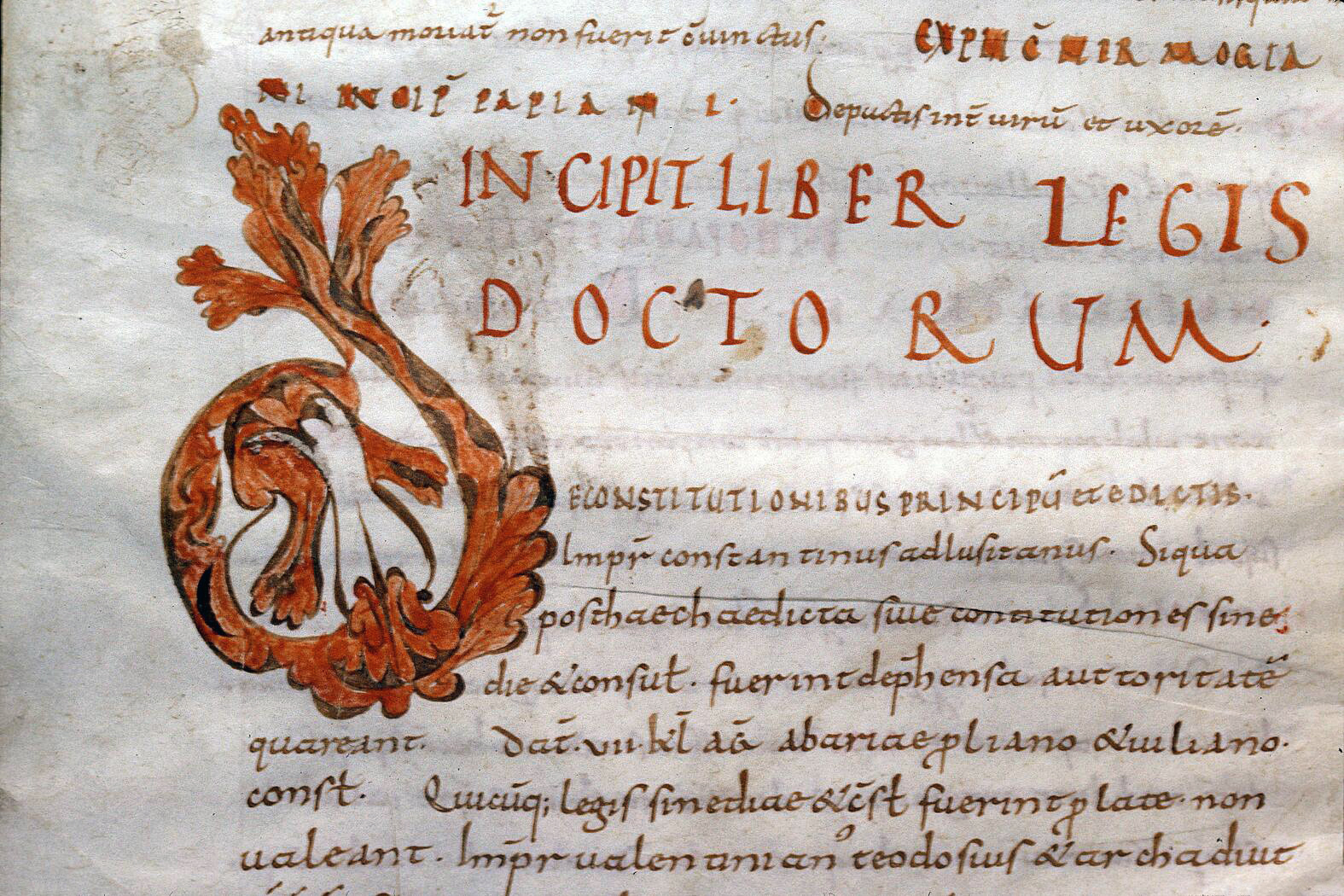
Incipit from a 10th-century manuscript of the Breviarium Alaricianum

Parts of the Codex Euricianus can be found later, probably as a base, in the Lex Baiuvariorum, the first Bavarian legislative codification. Also other Germanic legal codifications, those of the Burgundians (lex Romana Burgundionum) or Franks and Alamanni (lex Alamannorum), also are considered influenced by the Codex Euricianus.

After the death of Euric, the legislation remained in use and was even extended. Euric's son, Alaric II, added a piece of legislation known as the Breviary of Alaric (also known as Liber Aniani, after the supposed writer). These two laws together remained largely in force until the Visigoths settled definitively in Spain under King Liuvigild (568-586). This king adopted a new legislation, the Codex Revisius, but it was lost. In 654, more extensive legislation was introduced, the Lex Visigothorum. This legislation became a territorial legislation and no longer legislation that settled disputes between population groups, such as the Codex Euricianus.

== See also ==
- Early Germanic law
- Lex Visigothorum, 654
