= Lex Frisionum =

9th-century Frisian legal code

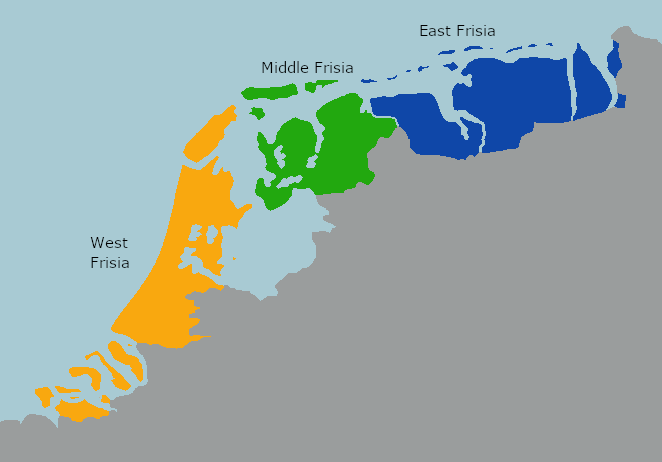
The three main divisions of Frisia according to the Lex Frisionum

The Lex Frisionum (lit. 'Law of the Frisians') is a set of legal documents governing early medieval Frisia. Written in 802, it was recorded in Latin during the reign of Charlemagne when the Frankish conquest of Frisia was completed by the final defeat of the Saxon rebel leader Widukind. The law code covered the region of the Frisians.

== Content ==
The Frisians were divided into four legal classes, to whom the law, or those transgressions of it that incurred set fines, applied. They were the nobles, the freemen, the serfs and slaves. The clergy are not mentioned in the Lex Frisionum as they were not liable to civil law.

The Frisians received the title of freemen and were allowed to choose their own potestaat, or imperial governor. In the Lex Frisionum three districts of Frisia are clearly distinguished: the law governs all of Frisia, but West Frisia "between Zwin and Vlie" and East Frisia "between Lauwers and Weser" have certain stated exceptional provisions.

At the partition treaty of Verdun (843) the whole of Frisia became part of Lotharingia; at the treaty of Meersen (870) it was briefly divided between the kingdoms of the East Franks (Austrasia) and the West Franks (Neustria), but in 880 the whole country was reunited under Austrasia.

The first twenty-two chapters of the Lex Frisionum are entirely concerned with schedules of fines (compositio) and wergeld, the compensations due victims or their kin, scheduled according to the social ranks of perpetrator and victim. Remarkably, the fine for killing a woman was exactly the same as for a man of the same rank, a feature of Frisian law that links it to Anglo-Saxon law, and stands apart from all other German codes. A further eleven chapters contain the 'Additions of the Wise Men' (Additio sapientum), ten subheadings from the judgements of Wiemar and of Saxmund of whom nothing is known, as well as sections from the Lex Thuringorum ('Law Code of the Thuringians') to cover instances not previously covered.

A noble's defense was to gather a specified number of "oath-helpers" willing to swear that the crime was not committed.

The only trial by ordeal mentioned – and mentioned twice – in the Lex Frisionum is the ordeal by boiling water. A stone had to be withdrawn from a seething cauldron: if the blisters were healed within three days, the man was innocent.

== Transmission ==
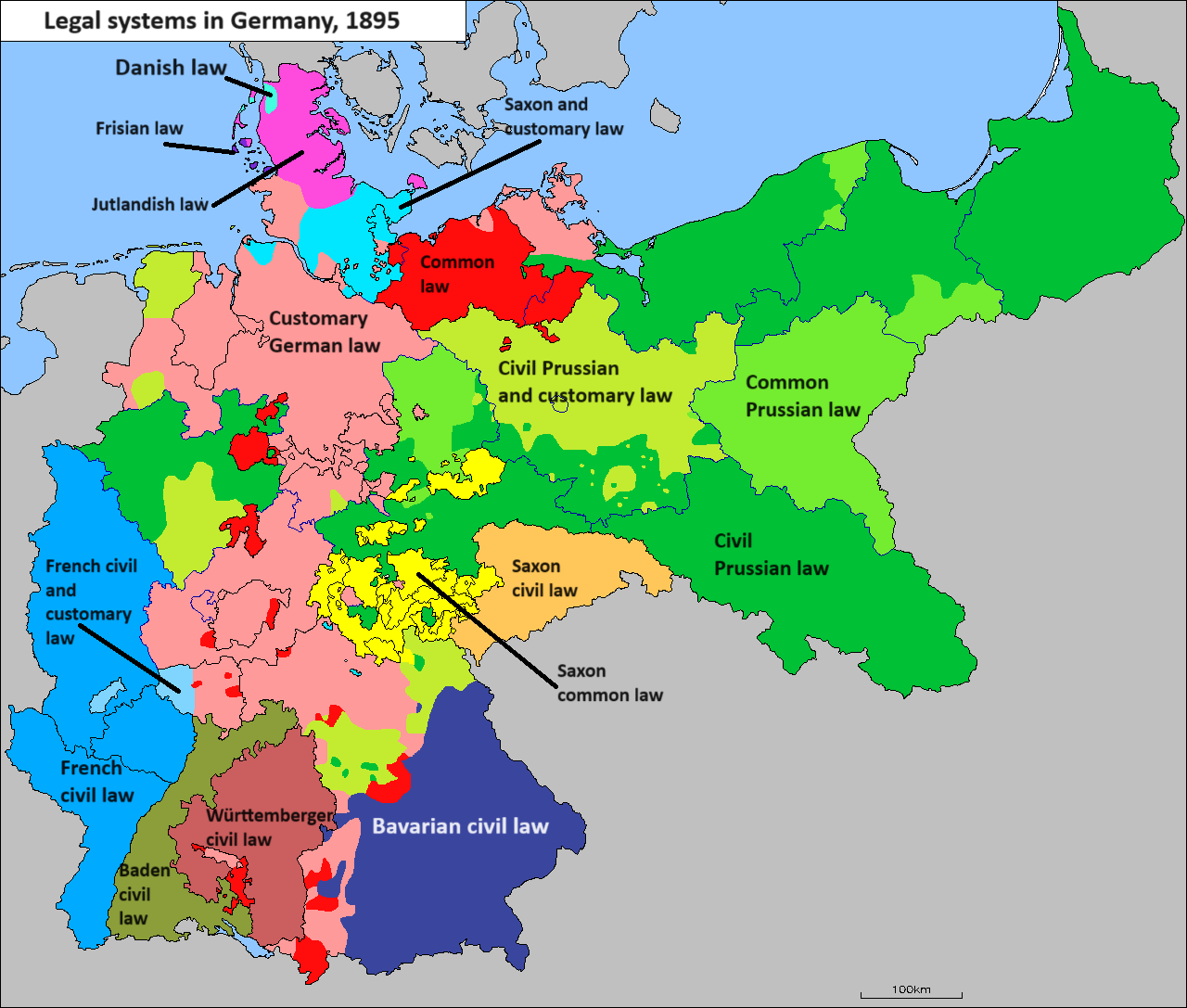
Legal systems in Germany prior to the enactment of the Bürgerliches Gesetzbuch

On numismatic grounds based on the amounts of fines (compositio) and wergeld, the laws from the Lex Frisionum date from the first half of the 7th century at the latest.

There are no surviving manuscripts of the Lex Frisionum. The only testimony is the oldest printed version, which dates from 1557. In that year, the scholar Joannis Basilius Herold made a compilation of all Germanic laws from the time of Charlemagne, Originum ac Germanicarum Antiquitatum Libri..., printed by Heinrich Petri of Basel. Among them was printed the Lex Frisionum, but from what source, or how corrupted was Herold's text, is unknown; the title-page of his edition indicates that the material was drawn from the library (now dispersed) of the Fulda monastery.

The surviving version is apparently a rough draft, still retaining Germanic pagan elements, which doubtless would have been edited out in the finished version, which Charlemagne apparently contemplated assembling for each of the Germanic peoples in his empire.

== See also ==
- Early Germanic law
