= Alois von Brinz =

German jurist and politician

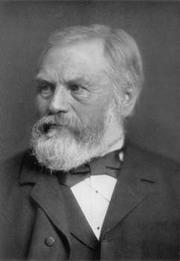
- Born: Alois Brinz; February 25, 1820; Weiler im Allgäu
- Died: September 13, 1887 (aged 67); Munich,
- Occupations: Jurist, Academic, and Politician

Alois (Aloys) Ritter von Brinz (25 February 1820, Weiler im Allgäu – 13 September 1887, Munich) was a German jurist and politician.

He taught as a professor at the University of Erlangen, Charles University of Prague, University of Tübingen (1866-), Ludwig-Maximilians-Universität München (1871-1887).

He was a researcher of Roman law.

== Life ==
Alois von Brinz, was born to Alois Brinz and Katharina Gsell in 1820. His father was a Doctor of Laws, his grandfather a master baker in Weiler. Brinz studied at the Ludwig-Maximilians-Universität München and the Friedrich Wilhelm University of Berlin and then entered the judicial service of his home state of Bavaria. In Berlin, Professor Adolf August Friedrich Rudorff had encouraged him in the detailed scientific study of Roman law, something which he intensified during his practical work.

In 1851, the University of Erlangen–Nuremberg made him an außerordentlicher Professor (i.e., professor without chair). From 1854 onwards, he worked there as a full professor (ordentlicher Professor) for Roman law. In 1857, he took up a similar position at the Charles University in Prague. In Prague, Brinz also became politically active, becoming a member of the Bohemian parliament in 1861 and later taking a seat in the Austrian Reichsrat. In the Bohemian parliament, he was a dedicated parliamentary orator and politician and, together with the other leaders of the German party, Johann Friedrich Wilhelm Herbst and Leopold Hasner von Artha, resolutely defended German interests.

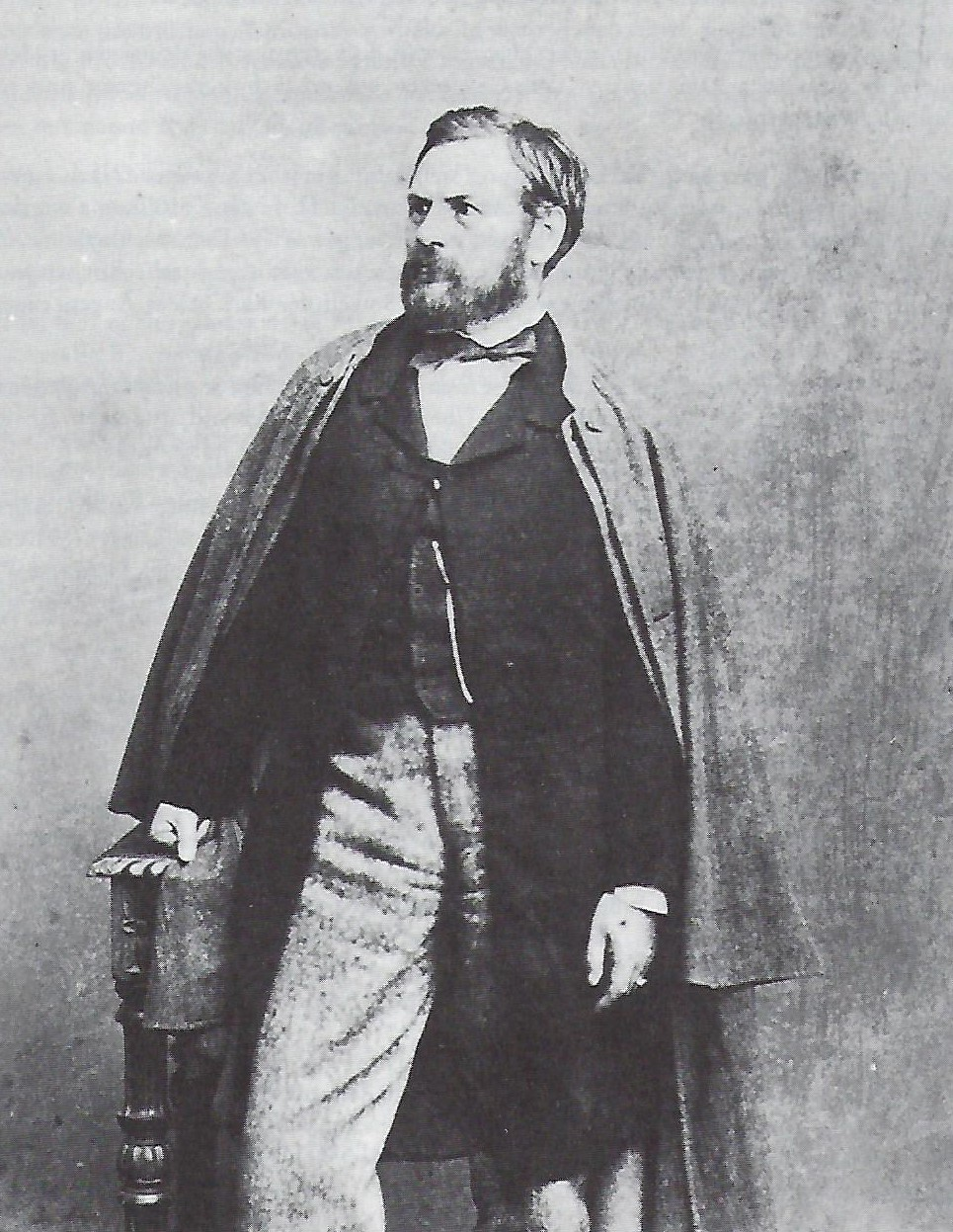
Alois von Brinz

In 1866, he took up a professorship at the University of Tübingen. Here he finished his Textbook of the Pandects (Lehrbuch der Pandekten). He rejected a mandate to join the parliament of Württemberg, but thereupon the parliament elected him a member of the constitutional court.

From 1871 onwards, Alois von Brinz taught Roman civil law at the Ludwig-Maximilians-Universität München was eventually elected Rector of the university. In 1872, he was awarded the Order of Merit of the Bavarian Crown and due to the Order's statutes, thus entered the German nobility. In 1883, he was elected an ordinary member of the Class for History of the Bavarian Academy of Sciences and Humanities. Ludwig II awarded him the Order of Merit of the Bavarian Crown. He was raised to the hereditary nobility.

He was a member of the Studentenverbindungen Corps Suevia München and Corps Frankonia Prag Saarbrücken.

== Family ==
- Martin Brinz, a baker in Weiler, fought for Austria against Napoleon, as did his seven brothers; was taken away after the war as a hostage.
  - Alois Brinz (born in Weiler; died 1835) was a Doctor of Laws and later clerk of the regional court in Kempten; married Katharina Gsell (born 1793 in Weiler; died 1862), had 10 children.
    - Alois Ritter von Brinz (born 1820 in Weiler; died 1887 in Munich) married 1857 Caroline Zenetti (born 1825; died 1895), daughter of senior civil servant and regional president Johann Baptist Ritter von Zenetti; 6 children (daughters Anna and Maria and four sons, Johann, Eduard, Konrad and Arnold)

From the same family are descended the well-known politicians Dr. Bernhard Vogel and his brother Dr. Hans-Jochen Vogel.

== Literary works ==
Alois von Brinz composed numerous essays on legal themes. The work Die Lehre von der Kompensation in the area of Roman law earned him much acclaim from the scholars of this field. His main piece of work, the Lehrbuch der Pandekten, was on many occasions described as the most original legal work of the 19th century.

- Die Lehre von der Kompensation, 1849
- Kritische Blätter zivilistischen Inhalts, 1852–53
- Lehrbuch der Pandekten, 2 vpls, 1857–1871
- Zum Rechte der Bonae fidei possessio, 1875
