= Lex Saxonum =

Series of laws issued to subdue the Saxon nation (782–803)

The Lex Saxonum are a series of laws issued by Charlemagne between 782 and 803 as part of his plan to subdue the Saxon nation. The law is therefore a compromise between the traditional customs and statutes of the pagan Saxons and the established laws of the Frankish Empire.

== Text ==
The Lex Saxonum apparently dates from 803, since it contains provisions which appear in the Capitulare legi Ribuariae additum of that year. The law established the ancient customs, at the same time eliminating anything that was contrary to the spirit of Christianity; it proclaimed the peace of the churches, whose possessions it guaranteed and whose right of asylum it recognized.

The Lex Saxonum has been preserved in two manuscripts and two old editions (by B. J. Herold and du Tillet). The text has been edited by Karl von Richthofen in the Monumenta Germaniae Historica, Leges, v. The law contains ancient customary enactments of Saxony, and, in the form that has been preserved, is later than the conquest of Saxony by Charlemagne. It is preceded by two capitularies of Charlemagne for Saxony: the Capitulatio de partibus Saxoniae (A. Boretius i. 68), which dates from either 782 or 795, and is characterized by great severity, death being the penalty for every offence against the Christian religion; and the Capitulare Saxonicum (A. Boretius i. 71), of 28 October 797, in which Charlemagne shows less brutality and pronounces simple compositions for misdeeds which were previously punishable by death.
