= 509 =

Calendar year

509 in various calendars
Gregorian calendar	509; DIX
Ab urbe condita	1262
Assyrian calendar	5259
Balinese saka calendar	430–431
Bengali calendar	−85 – −84
Berber calendar	1459
Buddhist calendar	1053
Burmese calendar	−129
Byzantine calendar	6017–6018
Chinese calendar	戊子年 (Earth Rat); 3206 or 2999 — to — 己丑年 (Earth Ox); 3207 or 3000
Coptic calendar	225–226
Discordian calendar	1675
Ethiopian calendar	501–502
Hebrew calendar	4269–4270
- Hindu calendars
Vikram Samvat	565–566
Shaka Samvat	430–431
Kali Yuga	3609–3610
Holocene calendar	10509
Iranian calendar	113 BP – 112 BP
Islamic calendar	117 BH – 115 BH
Javanese calendar	395–396
Julian calendar	509; DIX
Korean calendar	2842
Minguo calendar	1403 before ROC 民前1403年
Nanakshahi calendar	−959
Seleucid era	820/821 AG
Thai solar calendar	1051–1052
Tibetan calendar	ས་ཕོ་བྱི་བ་ལོ་ (male Earth-Rat); 635 or 254 or −518 — to — ས་མོ་གླང་ལོ་ (female Earth-Ox); 636 or 255 or −517

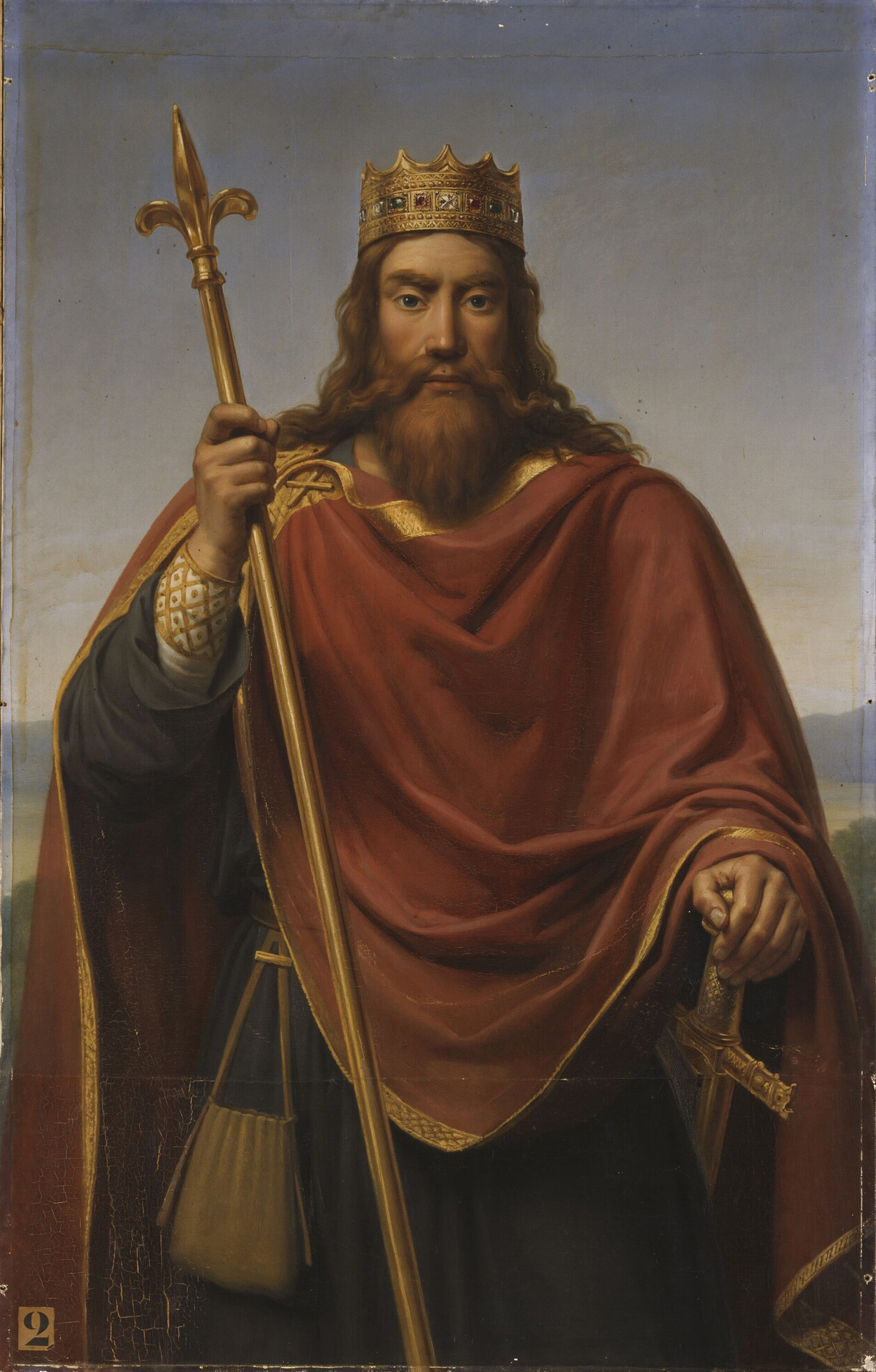
King Clovis I by François-Louis Dejuinne (1835)

Year 509 (DIX) was a common year starting on Thursday of the Julian calendar. At the time, it was known as the Year of the Consulship of Inportunus without colleague (or, less frequently, year 1262 Ab urbe condita). The denomination 509 for this year has been used since the early medieval period, when the Anno Domini calendar era became the prevalent method in Europe for naming years.

== Events ==
=== By place ===
==== Europe ====
- Clovis I (Chlodowech) becomes the first Catholic king of the Franks, uniting all the Frankish tribes under his rule. He controls an immense territory in Gaul (modern France), and delivers a major blow for the Church against the Arian heresy.

== Births ==
- Kinmei, emperor of Japan (d. 571)
- Wei Xiaokuan, general of Western Wei (d. 580)

== Deaths ==
- Chlodoric, king of the Ripuarian Franks
- Sigobert the Lame, king of the Ripuarian Franks
