= Doda of Reims =

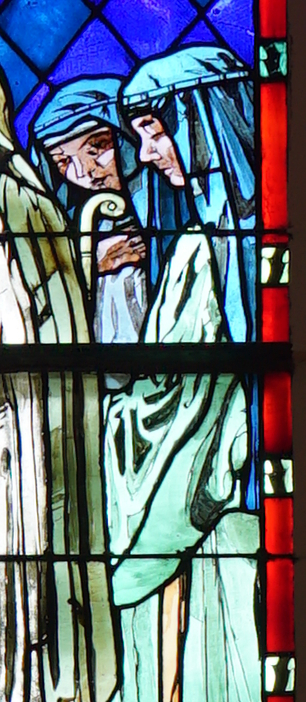

Saint Dode (born before 509) was an abbess of Saint Pierre de Reims and a French saint whose feast day is 24 April. She is reputed to be the daughter of Chloderic, King of the Ripuarian Franks and the sister of Munderic, making her a princess of the Ripuarian Franks.

== History ==
Doda lived in Reims in the 6th century, she was the second abbess of Saint-Pierre-les-Dames in Reims. There is some confusion regarding her parentage.

Flodoard, in his Historia ecclesiæ Remensis says she was a niece of Balderic, Abbot of Montfaucon and Beuve, founders of the Abbey of Saint-Pierre-les-Dames de Reims and children of a king Sigebert. Flodoard identifies this king as Sigebert I (c. 535 – c. 575), king of Austrasia, when perhaps it is, in fact, Sigobert the Lame (died c. 509), king of Cologne. Although Doda is reputed to be the daughter of Sigobert's son Chlodoric, chronologically, it seems difficult to make of Doda a daughter of Chlodéric. She would more likely be Sigobert the Lame's granddaughter, the daughter of a younger sister of Chloderic, born some time shortly before their father's death.

Doda is raised by her aunt, Beuve. Later, she was promised in marriage to a lord of the court of Sigebert I, but Doda refused the marriage. The lord tried to abduct her, but died as a result of a fall from his horse during the attempt. Dode then took refuge in her aunt's abbey. She succeeded Beuve as abbess. At the end of her life, she obtained from Pepin of Landen, an act designed to protect her community.

She is venerated in the Roman Catholic and Eastern Orthodox Churches.

== Flodoard's account ==
There once existed several basilicas and several monasteries within and around the town of Reims, which now are no more; but there are still two convents in the town, one of which is called the monastery above, because of its location and is said to have been erected in honor of the Blessed Virgin and St. Peter by Saint Baudri and his sister Beuve, who was the abbess. It is said that they were both of royal blood, the children of King Sigebert, and had a niece Dode, a very chaste young girl, who had been promised in marriage to a grandee of the house of King Sigebert. But Bove, her aunt, taught her to serve God and keep her virginity. The courtier, seeing the young girl's resistance, endeavored to rob her and to have her as his wife; but it happened that while he sought by all means to carry out his designs, the horse which he mounted, fell and he broke his neck. Blessed Dode, succeeded her aunt in the government of the monastery; it was she who obtained from King Pepin for this abbey a charter of immunities which we still have. The bodies of these two holy abbesses rested for a long time in the church outside the city where the monastery had first been, until, after having been exhumed with several revelations and miracles, they were transferred to this new church which we see today, where they were deposed with veneration, and are continually honored by the reverence and homage of the virgins servants of the Lord. - Flodoard, Historia ecclesiæ Remensis, Livre quatrième, chapitre XXXVIII.

== Sources and citations ==
- Christian Settipani, Les ancêtres de Charlemagne (France: Éditions Christian, 1989).
- Christian Settipani, Continuité gentilice et continuité familiale dans les familles sénatoriales romaines à l'époque imperiale, mythe et réalité, Addenda I - III (July 2000–October 2002) (Prosopographica et Genealogica, 2002).
