= Silva Carbonaria =

Ancient forest in Belgium

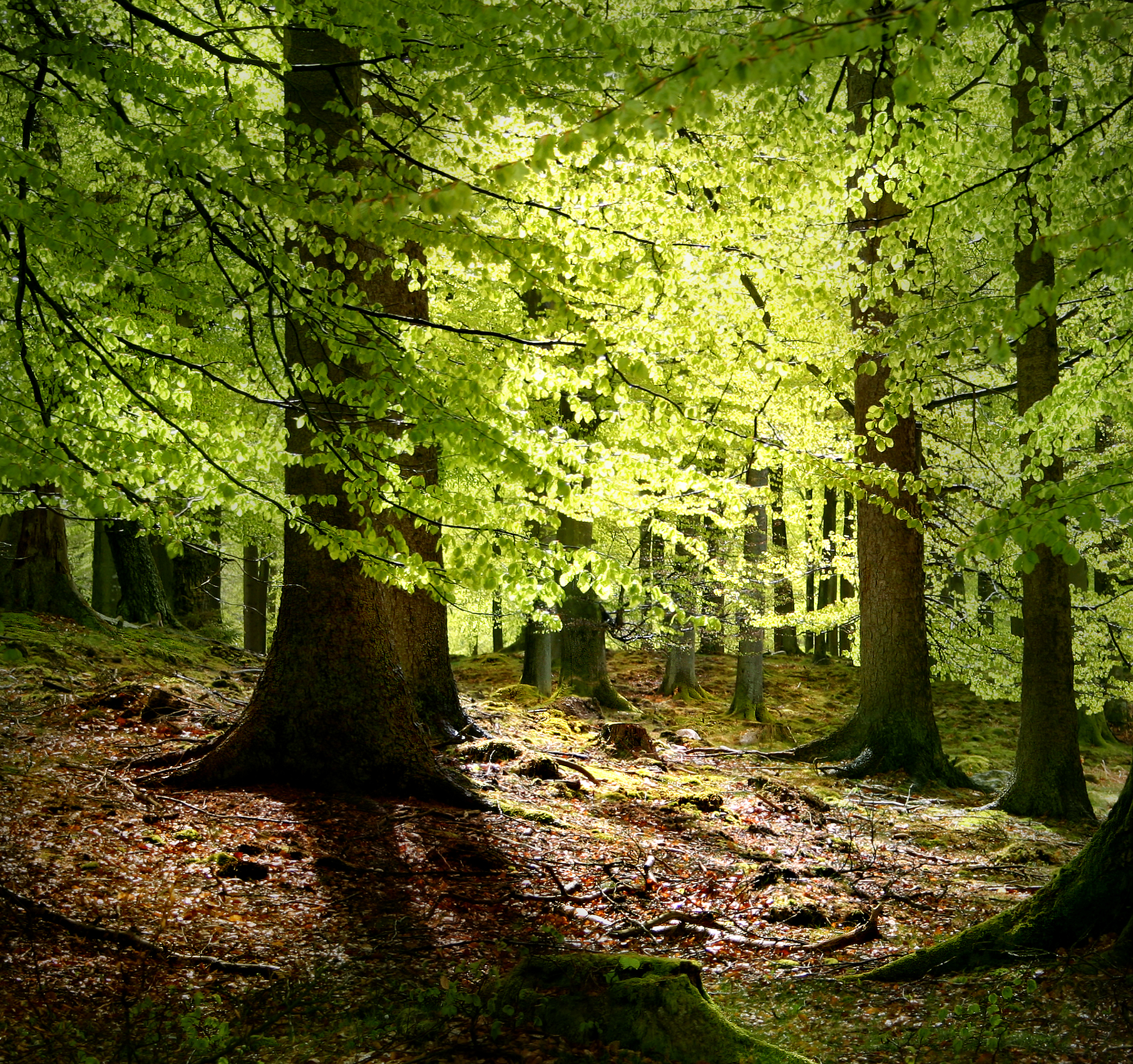
Compared to modern old-growth beech forests (shown here: Gribskov, Nordsjælland, Denmark), Silva Carbonaria was remarkably dense

The Silva Carbonaria (Latin for 'charcoal forest') was the dense old-growth forest of beech and oak that formed a natural boundary during the Late Iron Age through Roman times into the Early Middle Ages across what is now western Wallonia. The Silva Carbonaria was a vast forest that stretched from the rivers Zenne and the Dijle in the north to the Sambre in the south. Its northern outliers reached the then marshy site of modern Brussels.

Further to the southeast, the higher elevation and deep river valleys were covered by the even less penetrable ancient Arduenna Silva, the deeply folded Ardennes, which are still partly forested to this day. To the east, the forested zone was possibly considered to extend to the Rhine. It was there in Cologne in 388 CE that the magistri militum praesentalis Nannienus and Quintinus began a counter-attack against a Frankish incursion from across the Rhine, which was fought in the Silva Carbonaria.

== Roman road ==
The green diamonds show places named as having been in the Silva Carbonaria in medieval records. The Roman road between Bavay and Tongeren is shown in brown.

A great Roman road forming a "strategic axis" linked the Rhine crossing at Cologne with Maastricht, where it crossed the Maas at the head of navigation. Skirting the northern edges of the Silva Carbonaria, it passed through Tongeren, Kortrijk and Cambrai to reach the sea at Boulogne. The highway was the main east–west route in a landscape where the river valleys, tributaries of the Meuse and the Scheldt, tended southwest to northeast. It remained viable through the Early Middle Ages as the chaussée Brunehaut, the "Road of Brunehaut". As a public work its scale had become unimaginable in the Middle Ages: the chronicler Jean d'Outremeuse solemnly related in 1398 that Brunehaut, wife of Sigebert I, had built this wide paved road in 526, and that it was completed in a single night with the devil's aid.

== Use as a border ==
There are signs that the Silva Carbonaria represented the boundary between the Roman provinces of Gallia Belgica and Germania Inferior. In the Middle Ages, these provinces were still represented by the church dioceses of Reims and Cologne. On a smaller level, the forest served as a boundary between the Roman civitates of the Tungri to the east and the Nervii to the west. This boundary continued to be used into the Middle ages as the boundary between the bishoprics of Liège and Cambrai.

With the collapse of central Roman administration in the fourth century, Germanic Franks living along the Rhine border established kingdoms within the empire, and settled in less populated areas. The Salian Franks expanded their settlements from a starting point near Nijmegen until they pressed into the more populated and Romanized areas in the Silva Carbonaria and near the Maas. The Romanized population came to be known as *walhōz or "strangers" to the Germanic Franks—continued speaking a Late Latin, whose name survives in Walloon. In the past the Romance-Germanic linguistic division that marks Belgium to this day has been perhaps too facilely linked to these geographic parameters.

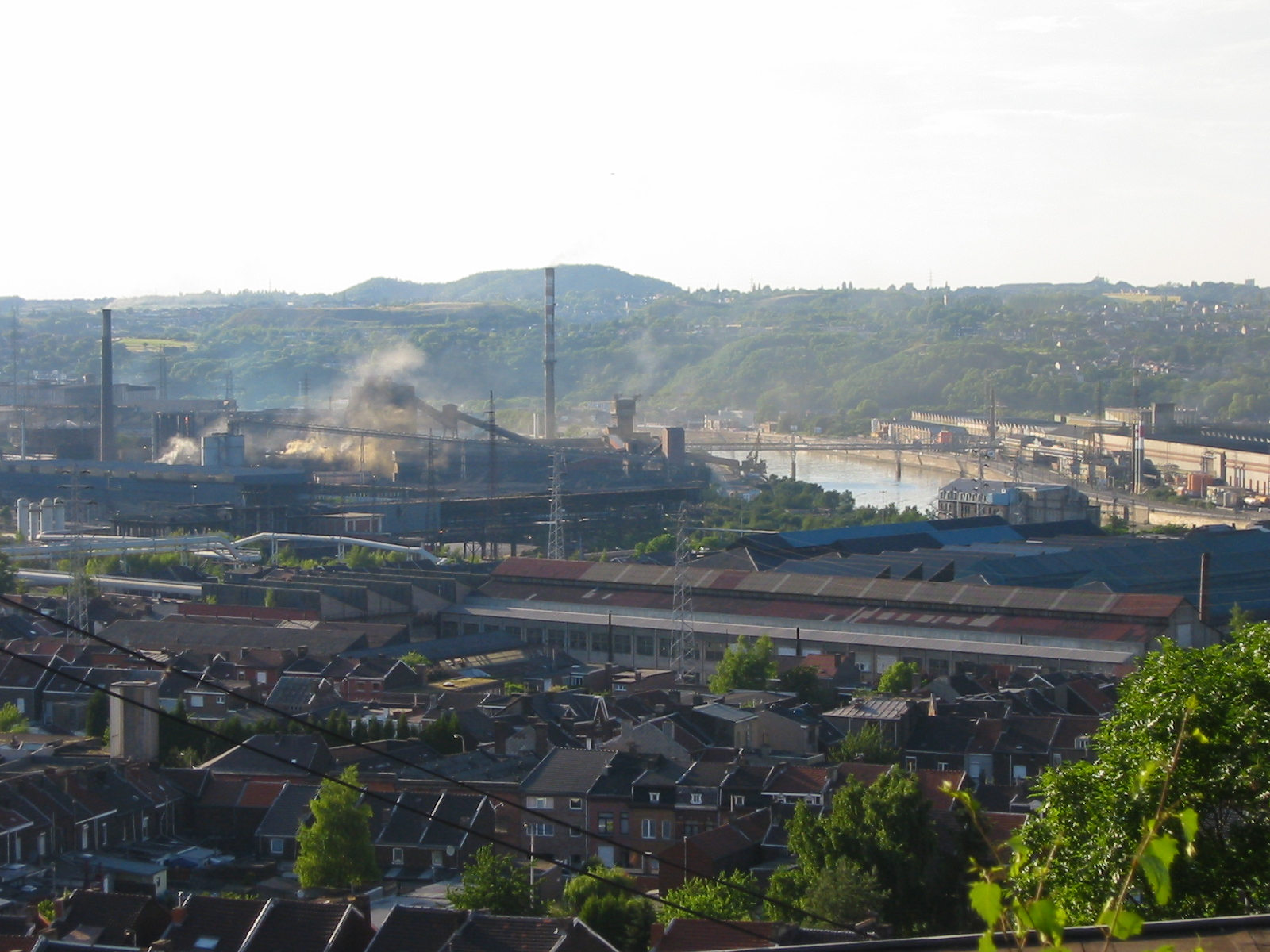
In the 19th century, the iron ore in the formerly wooded valleys fuelled the sillon industriel of Wallonia

For a time in the sixth century, the Silva Carbonaria formed a barrier between the West Frankish kingdom of Clovis and the East Frankish kingdom of Sigebert the Lame, centred on Cologne, until he was assassinated in the forest of Buchaw by his son some time after 507, and Clovis joined the two kingdoms. The Liber Historiae Francorum mentions that the Neustrian army invaded Austrasia in the succession battle of Pepin of Herstal and the war started when Ragenfrid and his army traversed the Silva Carbonaria. The Annales Mettenses Priores note that the wealth of Pepin of Herstal's family was their vast territories between the Silva Carbonaria and the river Meuse.

Throughout the rule of the Merovingian dynasty, founded by Clovis, the Silva Carbonaria thus became the boundary between their two kingdoms of Austrasia and Neustria. The Silva Carbonaria is mentioned in the Salic Law of the Franks, where it marked "the boundary of the territories occupied by the Frankish people". The Liber Historiae Francorum mentions that the war of succession after the death of Pepin of Herstal started when the Neustrian army, under the command of Ragenfrid (mayor of the palace), traversed the Silva Carbonaria

== Medieval monasteries ==
Extensive tracts of the untamed woodlands belonged to monasteries. The Benedictine Abbey of Lobbes lay in the Silva Carbonaria and that of Saint Foillan, in the present-day Sonian Forest (Forêt de Soignes/Zoniënwoud) not far from Nivelles. From the 8th century onwards, parts of the Silva Carbonaria were cleared for agriculture, eventually subdividing it in several smaller isolated forests like the Sonian forest today.

== Economic importance ==
The charcoal—which gave the forest its name and into which the woods were slowly converted—was required to fuel the scattered smelting furnaces that forged the iron found in outcroppings laid bare by riverside erosion. Before the Romans arrived, iron weapons forged in the Silva Carbonaria were traded by the Belgae to their cousins in the southeast of Britain. In the High Middle Ages further woodlands were cleared. Today the most significant remnant of the Silva Carbonaria is the Sonian Forest, preserved because it had been set aside as a noble hunt. At the start of the nineteenth century the area of this remnant of the primeval forest still covered about 100 square kilometres, but due to timber cutting its area has diminished to its current protected area of 44.21 km².

== Primary sources ==
- Mentioned as a boundary in the Lex Salica. Various versions can be compared here and here on the dMGH.de (Monumenta Germaniae Historica) collection.
- The Liber Historiae Francorum repeats the story found in Gregory of Chlodio going through the forest to take Tournai. Latin is here on the dMGH.de collection.
