= Chararic =

Chararic may refer to two early Germanic kings, both mentioned by Gregory of Tours:

- Chararic (Frankish king), reigned from sometime before 486 until his death sometime after 507
- Chararic (Suebian king), reigned c. 550 – 558/559
