= Beuve =

Frankish abbess

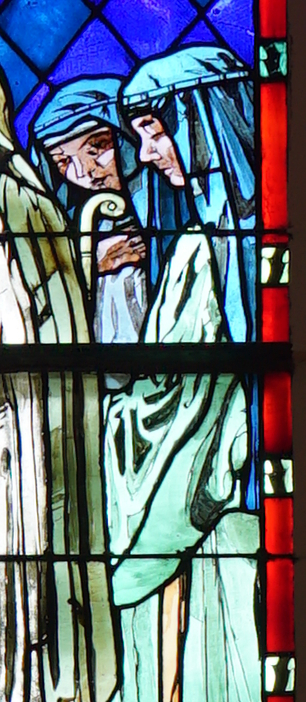

Saint Beuve (or Bove or Bova) and her brother Balderic (or Baudry) lived in the 7th century in France. According to Christian Settipani, their father was probably Sigobert the Lame, King of Cologne, rather than Sigebert I of Austrasia, as indicated by Flodoard. Together they founded the Abbey of Saint Pierre de Reims. Beuve was the first abbess.

== Family ==
Based on an oral tradition recorded by Flodoard, Canon of Reims, three centuries later, Beuve and her brother Balderic were reputed to be children of a king Sigebert, whom Flodoard identified as Sigebert I, king of Austrasia. Many early historians follow Fodoard in this. However, Christian Settipani finds that this contradicts what is known about Sigebert I. Sigebert is known to have had a son, Childebert II, and daughters Ingund (wife of Hermenegild), Clodesinde, betrothed to Authari, king of the Lombards, then to Reccared, king of the Visigoths and probably a daughter married to Duke Chrodoald. Sigebert I may have had other daughters mentioned by his contemporaries, but the case of an unknown son is much less certain. According to the Salic law, on the death of a Frankish king, all his sons would share the kingdom.

It is more likely that Beuve and Balderic are the offspring of Sigobert the Lame (d. 507), king of Cologne. They have a niece Doda who succeeds Beuve as abbess of Saint Pierre de Reims, and who later obtains from a prince named Pepin letters of protection for this community. It is clear that this prince can only be Pepin of Landen, mayor of the palace of Austrasia. Apart from Baldéric and Beuve, the only other known child of Sigobert is Chlodéric, who died in 508, so Doda, if she is the daughter of Chlodéric, was born at the latest in 508. Pépin of Landen became mayor of the palace in 613 at the earliest, giving Doda an age of at least 105 years at the time of signature of the act of protection, although it is not clear that Pepin was already mayor at the time the act was issued. There is no evidence that Doda was Chlodéric's daughter. She was likely born of an unnamed daughter of Sigebert, towards the end of his life, around 505–508. Her daughter Doda would then be born between 520 and 550, which gives her a more reasonable age at the time of the act of protection. The date of 545 may be retained for the birth of Doda. This leaves sixteen years to the accession of Sigebert I as king of Austrasia, and the legend affirms that she was promised in marriage to a lord of the court of Sigebert I.

== Life ==
Beuve seems to have begun her religious life in the monastery for women established at Reims by Clotilde and Saint Remigius. As it was outside the city walls, her brother Balderic built a house within the walls to provide greater protection for the nuns. He then went on to found the Abbey of Montfaucon.

Although Beuve wished to remain a simple nun, she was named abbess of the monastery Saint-Pierre. She established the Rule of St. Benedict in the abbey, and humbly practiced many fasts, prayers and vigils. Her brother Abbot Balderic visited regularly sharing advice and encouragement. On one such occasion Balderic became ill and died during a visit to Saint Pierre. Initially buried in the abbey, his remains were moved to Montfaucon. Beuve undertook the education of her niece Doda and welcomed her when she took the veil to escape a forced marriage. Upon Beuve's death, Doda succeeded her aunt as abbess.

They are also said to be related to King Dagobert, presumably Dagobert I of Austrasia.

Saint Beuve was the first abbess of Saint-Pierre-les-Dames in Reims. In 639, her brother Balderic established the convent for her. She was succeeded as abbess by her niece Doda (or Dode).

Her feast day is 24 April.

== Bibliography ==
- Vie des Saints et des Bienheureux selon l'ordre du calendrier, vol. 4 (Avril), Librairie Letouzey et Ané, 1946 .
- Settipani, Christian (1993). La préhistoire des Capétiens, 481-987. Nouvelle histoire généalogique de l'auguste maison de France. Vol. 1. Villeneuve d'Ascq: P. Van Kerrebrouck. ISBN 2-9501509-3-4.
- Christian Settipani, "L'apport de l'onomastique dans l'étude des généalogies carolingiennes", in Onomastique et Parenté dans l'Occident médiéval, Oxford, Linacre College, Unit for Prosopographical Research, coll. Prosopographica et Genealogica, 2000, 310 p. (ISBN 1-900934-01-9), p. 185-229.
