= Saint Beuve =

Saint Beuve may refer to:

- Saint Bobo
- Beuve, Abbess of Saint Pierre de Reims

== See also ==
- Charles Augustin Sainte-Beuve (1804–1869)
