= Chararic (Frankish king) =

Fifth-century Frankish ruler

King of Tongres
- Reign: c. 460–after 507 (510?)
- Successor: Clovis I as sole king
- Born: 5th century
- Died: after 507 (510?)
- Issue: a son
- Dynasty: Merovingian

Chararic was a Frankish king from sometime before 486 until his death sometime after 507. The primary source for his career is Gregory of Tours.

== History ==
Clovis I had asked Chararic for assistance in his war against Syagrius in 486, but Chararic held back, standing off to the side and awaiting the outcome before choosing whom he would support.

After arranging the murder of his ally Sigobert the Lame by his son Chlodoric and Chlodoric's subsequent death, Clovis turned against Chararic. He trapped and captured him and his son. They were imprisoned and tonsured; Chararic was ordained a priest and his son a deacon. According to Gregory, when Chararic complained to his son of their dishonour, his son replied with a remark suggesting that they allow their hair to grow long. This conversation was reported to Clovis, who consequently had them killed and annexed their kingdom and treasure.

Ian Wood notes it is surprising that Clovis waited over twenty years to deal with his rivals like Chararic, writing, "Clovis ought to have eradicated Frankish opposition earlier in his reign." However, the fact that he had Chararic tonsured clearly points to some time after Clovis' own conversion to Christianity, which Wood dates to soon after Clovis' victory over the Alemanni which was officially done in 496 A.D. Wood concludes, "If Gregory's ordering of events here is right, and there are no means of testing this part of his account, then the last years of Clovis' reign were concerned with the internal power politics of the Franks."

Other Frankish kings Clovis removed from power at this time, according to Gregory of Tours, include Ragnachar, who had supported Clovis against Syagrius, and Ragnachar's two brothers. After all these murders Gregory tells us that Clovis lamented that he was left with no family, implying that amongst these casualties were close relatives.

== Sources ==
- Gregory of Tours. The History of the Franks. 2 vol. trans. O. M. Dalton. Oxford: Clarendon Press, 1967.
