= Salian Franks =

4th and 5th century Franks in today's Netherlands and Belgium

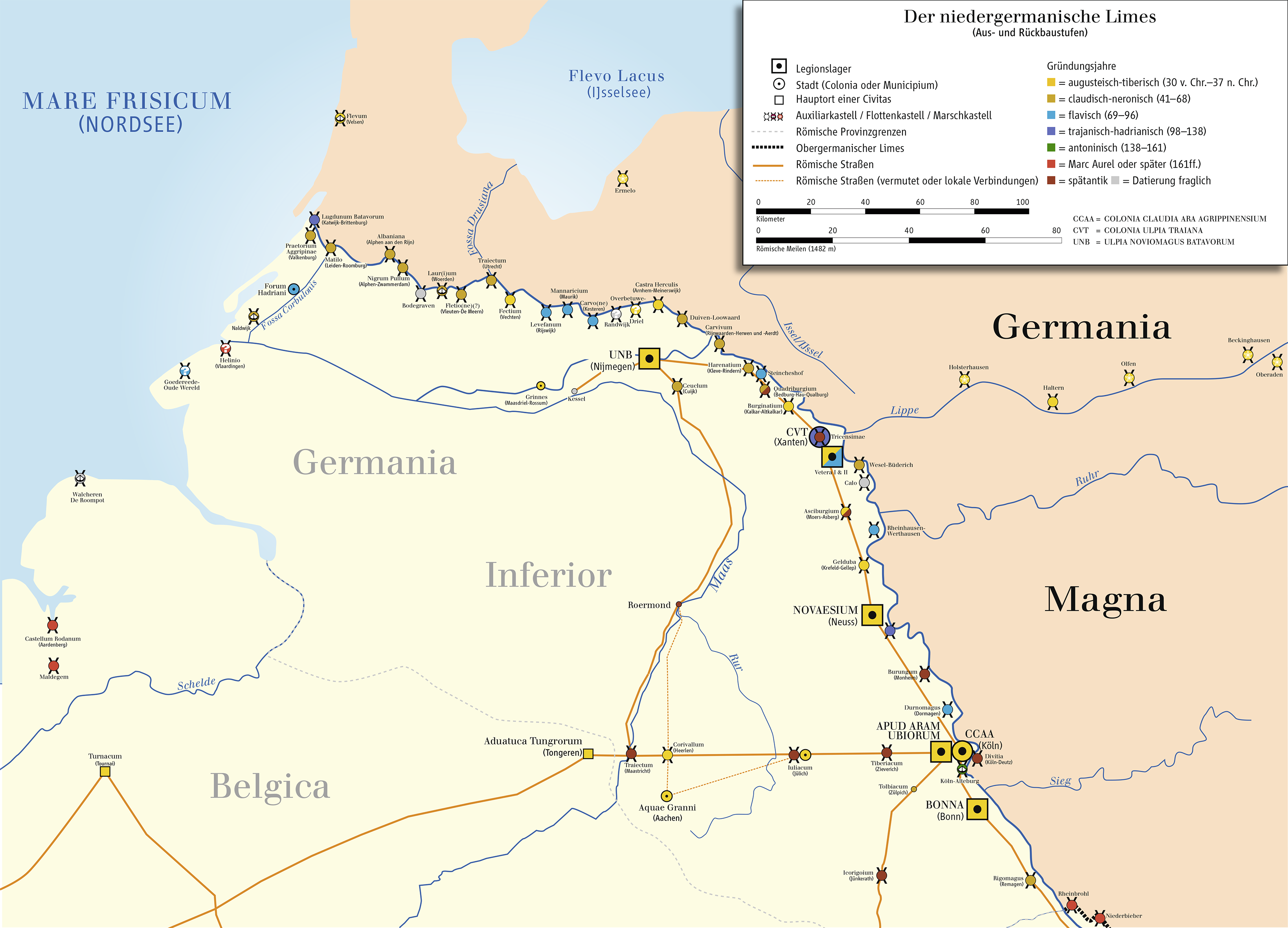
The Roman border along the Lower Rhine

The Salian Franks, or Salians, sometimes referred to by the Latin word Salii or Sali, were a Frankish people who lived in what is now the Netherlands in the 4th century. They are only mentioned under this name in historical records relating to one period when they came into conflict with Roman forces led by Julian the Apostate around 358 AD, when he was ruling Gaul as Caesar under his cousin the emperor Constantius II. In modern times scholars have also traditionally used the term "Salians" to refer to the much later Franks who became the rulers of much of present day northern France in the 5th century - at first under the leadership of Chlodio, and later under the leadership of the Merovingian dynasty — seeing them as the descendants of the original Salians.

Roman sources describing the events of 358 AD indicate that the Salians were a Frankish people who had entered the empire from across the Rhine some time earlier, and settled with Roman consent in Batavia, which is a large island in the Rhine delta, that lay on the northern boundary of the Roman Empire. They had subsequently been settling in the relatively unpopulated and infertile area of Texandria, south of the delta, which was still considered to be under direct Roman control. They were also one of the tribes of this region who were being paid off by the Roman government to allow the safe passage of grain shipments up the Rhine, along with another people, the Chamavi. Julian, seeking to end the payments, entered the region with military force. After defeating both peoples and taking hostages he proclaimed new agreements with them, authorizing the Salians to keep any lands they had settled without fighting, but forcing many of the Chamavi to return to their homeland. He also obliged both peoples to contribute soldiers to the Roman military. Consistent with this, Julian is known to have created several military units named after the Salians.

Although no longer generally accepted, until the 1950s it was assumed that the Salians subsequently expanded their territories to the south under that name, and became one of two large divisions among the Franks in the 5th century — the other being the Ribuarian Franks, living to their east. This proposed division is not described in any contemporary records, but rather based on the names of two distinct legal codes used by the Franks after they were united under Merovingian rule. The older one, the so-called Salic Law (Lex Salica) was valid in what is now northern France, and its name might be related to the name of the earlier Salians, although this is no longer considered certain. The later one, the Lex Ripuaria, in contrast, is associated with the region near Cologne in what is now Germany. In the 21st century, scholars doubt that the term "Salic" in Salic law referred to any specific tribe by the 5th century, and some historians argue that it never did. It is also no longer widely accepted that the two Frankish legal codes imply two distinct Frankish peoples.

== Name ==
Many etymologies for the word Sali have been proposed, but the origins of the name remain uncertain. One of the challenges is that the name is so short, which means that there are many similar sounding words. When considering the possible etymologies, scholars are also confronted with questions about whether the word is related to much later terms including Frankish Salic law, the Frankish legal concept of terra salica (the demesne lands of the lord of the manor), the regional name Salland north of the river delta in the Netherlands, or the name of the river IJssel which flows through Salland.

The proposal of Norbert Wagner and Matthias Springer is that the name has a Germanic etymology, related to such modern words as German Geselle, meaning a companion or journeyman. It was argued by Wagner that these terms are furthermore related to Saal, meeting house or hall, because companions share accommodation. For scholars who accept such proposals the Salians in 358 AD may simply have been calling themselves a group of confederates or friends, and the much later Salic law may have had a meaning equivalent to "civil law". Less widely accepted, Springer has even argued that the term Salii in 358 AD was misunderstood by Roman authors, and was actually a Germanic term for the Franks in general.

Other possible etymologies include these:

- Based on the report of Zosimus that the Salians moved into the Roman Empire from somewhere north of the Rhine, older scholarship proposed that the name may have derived from the name of the IJssel river, formerly called Hisla or Isola in the oldest medieval documents.
- In contrast, another old proposal was that the Salians became a people only once they settled together on the island of Batavia, and that their name is therefore based upon an otherwise unknown Germanic word for "island", meaning they were "island dwellers".
- A connection has been proposed to words for "salt", which are similar in many languages. An argument against this is that the Salians, and the regions where they might have lived, including Salland and the IJssel, were not near saltwater during the Roman era.
- It has also been proposed that the name is related to an Indo-European word for jumping or leaping, such as the Latin verb salire, from which is derived the similar name of an order of leaping priests of Mars in Rome, called the Salii. There is however no generally agreed explanation about why this would be their name.

== The campaign of Julian in 358 AD ==
Only Zosimus, who wrote around 500 AD, gives information about the Salians before 357 AD. He describes them as a people detached or separated from the Franks (Φράγκων ἀπό-μοιρον), who had been expelled from their own country by the Saxons and settled at some time prior to 357 AD on the large island of Batavia, between two branches of the Rhine. Although Batavia was within the boundaries once governed by the Romans, the Salians were governing it by 357 AD. He describes the Saxons who forced them there as the strongest of all the barbarians dwelling near that Rhine delta region. A more contemporary source, Ammianus Marcellinus, also associated the Salians with the Franks, calling them Franks "whom custom calls the Salii".

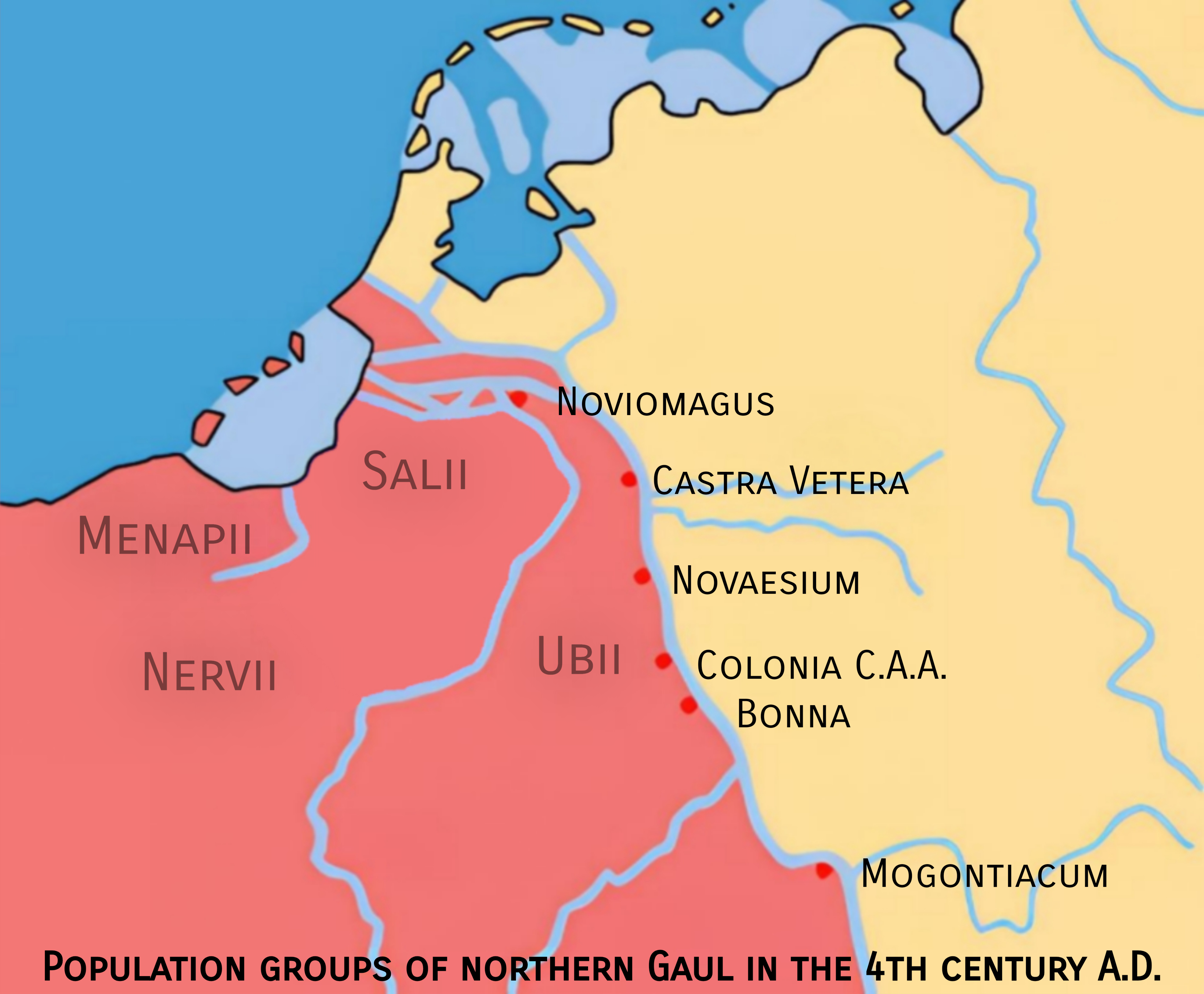

The Romans had inconsistent and incomplete control of the Rhine delta since the crisis of the third century. The population and agricultural activity had decreased dramatically, and the Romans had given it up as an area for normal taxation and governance. Some modern scholars believe the Salians attacked by Julian to be descendants of the Frankish dediticii who Constantius Chlorus allowed to remain in Batavia around 293-294 AD, when the Romans reasserted themselves there after the revolt of Carausius. They were probably also descended from the Franks who were later allowed to settle in Texandria by the brother of Constantius II, his co-emperor Constans, already in 342 AD, after fighting there in 341 AD. Julian also associated the usurper Magnentius, who had killed Constans and ruled the region in 350-353 AD, with the Franks and Saxons of this region. At the Battle of Mursa Major in 351 AD in present day Croatia many Roman soldiers with Frankish and Saxon backgrounds died fighting in this Roman civil war. Like Magnentius himself one of his main commanders Silvanus, who defected to Constantius, had Frankish ancestry. He was given the task of rebuilding defences in Gaul, but killed as a rebel in 355 AD. In the same year Julian was given the rank of Caesar, and assigned to rule Gaul under his cousin Constantius, and rebuild the Rhine defences against the Franks and Saxons who Magnentius had apparently coordinated with.

Julian's campaign against the Salians was at least partly triggered by a Roman concern with bringing grain shipments from Britain safely up the Rhine, without being impeded by the Salians and other Rhine delta peoples. Libanius (Oration 18.83) an orator who corresponded with Julian and wrote his funeral oration, emphasizes the problems caused by barbarians on the Rhine blocking such grain shipments. Both Libanius and Zosimus (3.5) reported that Julian, wanting to supply inland areas where cultivation had been ruined by other conflicts, built a fleet on the Rhine and began shipping grain up the river to Roman cities. In his letter to the Athenians Julian however complained of the disgrace that despite quick construction of a large fleet, the praetorian prefect Florentius sent to Gaul by Constantius II in 357, "promised to pay the barbarians a fee of two thousand pounds weight of silver in return for a passage". Julian decided that this payment to the barbarians should not be made, and instead he marched against these barbarian tribes - specifically the Salians and Chamavi. His account of the campaign itself is compressed: "I received the submission of part of the Salian tribe, and drove out the Chamavi and took many cattle and women and children. And I so terrified them all, and made them tremble at my approach that I immediately received hostages from them and secured a safe passage for my food supplies". The conflict between Julian and Florentius itself appears to be part of a set of related disputes for fiscal control of northern Gaul, and Julian may have been disrupting a prior state of affairs which entailed integration of the Chamavi and the Salians into imperial systems of military taxation and supply.

Another turn of events which triggered this campaign was the entry of the Chamavi into the Roman region south of the Rhine. According to Zosimus the barbarians of the delta region were losing all hope because of Julian's policies on the Rhine, and they were expecting the complete destruction of everyone who still lived there. Apparently in reaction to this, the Saxons sent a faction of a Saxon people called the "Quadi" (by which he apparently meant the Chamavi), into the land held by the Romans. According to Zosimus, these "Quadi" (Chamavi) used boats on the Rhine to get around Frankish tribes who effectively protected the Roman frontier, and into the Roman river delta, where they expelled the Salians from Batavia and established a base for themselves. Ammianus simply says that the Salians dared to start building homes within Roman territory in Texandria, and that the Chamavi attempted to do something similar. Zosimus, in contrast, describes the Salians as friends of Rome who were forced by the Chamavi into these Roman territories. He claims that Julian gave instructions to attack the "Quadi" (Chamavi) speedily, but not to kill Salians, or to prevent them from entering Roman territory, because they had not come as enemies, but had been forced there. He added: "As soon as the Salii heard of the kindness of Julian, some of them went with their king into the Roman territory, and others fled to the extremity of their country, but all humbly committed their lives and fortunes to Caesar's gracious protection".

Ammianus and Zosimus agree that in the winter of 357/8 AD, a deputation of the Salians came to the Roman city of Tongeren. However Ammianus portrays them not as supplicants but as offering their terms: as long as they remained quiet they should be treated as if they were in their own lands, and no one should harass or attack them. Julian gave the envoys gifts, dismissed them, and then sent his general Severus along the Maas river in order to attack these Salians suddenly "like a thunderstorm" (tamquam fulminis turbo, a whirlwind of lightning). According to Ammianus it is only then that the Salians were in the position of begging for mercy rather than offering peace terms. Ammianus wrote that Julian, with "victory already assured", now "inclined toward mercy and accepted their surrender". He took property and children as part of the surrender. Libanius (18.75-76) does not name the tribes involved but also describes this first lightning strike along the river (περὶ τὸν ποταμὸν ἀστράψας), and, consistent with Ammianus and Zosimus, "he struck an entire nation with such terror that they deemed it better to relocate and become part of his kingdom, considering life under his rule more desirable than their own. They requested land, and they received it. He skilfully used barbarians against barbarians, as they found it far better to pursue the enemy alongside him than to flee with them". According to Libanius, Julian realized that he also needed to cross the river, and because he had no boats he forced his cavalry and infantry to swim. The people there were attacked but came as supplicants to Julian before their houses were all burnt down.

Following the conquest of the Salians, they assisted Julian against the Chamavi, together with the specialized guerrilla forces of Charietto who, according to Zosimus (3.6), were brought into the conflict because the Chamavi did not dare direct engagement with the Romans, and chose instead to make stealthy attacks into the Roman lands. Charietto's approach worked, and he captured the son of the Chamavi king alive, and this was later revealed to the Chamavi king in the final negotiations which Julian conducted via translator while standing on a boat in the river.

The Salians were then brought into Roman units defending the empire from other Frankish raiders. The Notitia dignitatum, listing Roman military units at the end of the 4th century mentions the Salii iuniores Gallicani based in Hispania, the Salii seniores based in Gaul. There is also record of a numerus Saliorum. The names of these units do not necessarily mean that they were made up of Salians, but the units were created by Julian. Zosimus (3.8) writing around 500 AD says, apparently using military lists of his own time, that "Caesar stationed the Salians, a portion of the Quadi, and some of those on the island of Batavia in military units, which even in our time still seem to be preserved (δοχεῖ περισώζεσϑαι)".

== Later mentions ==
In panegyric literature the Salians were only mentioned twice, but in both cases they were used as a trope and no specific events were described:

- In a poem from 400, Claudian celebrates Stilicho's pacification of the Germani near the Rhine using names of famous Rhineland peoples from history: "The Salian now tills his fields, the Sygambrian beats his straight sword into a curved sickle". The Sugambri were defeated by the Romans and disappeared from the historical record centuries earlier.
- In 456 AD in a panegyric praising his father-in-law Avitus by saying he was better than various famous barbarian warriors, Sidonius Apollonaris wrote that the "Heruli were outpaced in running, the Hun in the use of javelins, the Frank in the art of swimming, the Sarmatian in wielding a shield, the Salian in swiftness of foot, and the Geloni in handling the sickle sword". The Geloni, for example, had not been mentioned in historical records for centuries.

== Possible continuation ==
From the first half of the fifth century onwards, a group of Franks pushed south west through the boundary of the Roman inhabited Silva Carbonaria and expanded their territory to the Somme in northern France. These Franks, headed by a Frankish king named Chlodio, conquered an area which included Turnacum (the modern Belgian city of Tournai) and Cameracum (the modern French city of Cambrai). According to Lanting & van der Plicht (2010), this probably happened in the period 445–450. Chlodio is never referred to as Salian, only Frankish, and his origins remain unclear. He is said by Gregory of Tours (II.9) to have launched his attack on Tournai through the Carbonaria Silva in present day Belgium, from a nearby fort on the other side of the forest named Dispargum.

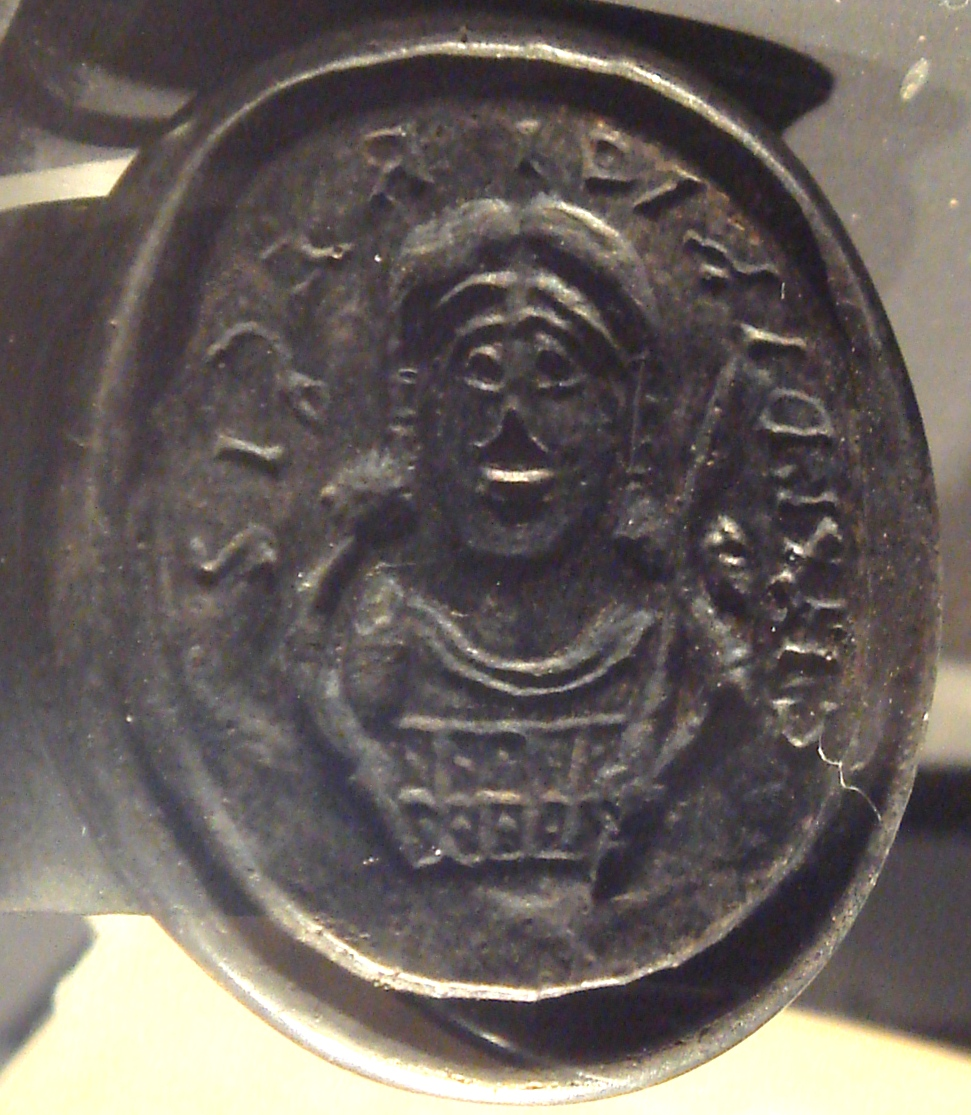
Signet ring of Childeric I, king of the Salian Franks from 457 to 481. Inscription CHILDIRICI REGIS ("of Childeric the king"). Found in his tomb at Tournai, now in the Monnaie de Paris

While their relationship to Chlodio is uncertain, Childeric I and his son Clovis I, who gained control over Roman Gaul were said to be related to him. Their dynasty, the Merovingians, were named after Childeric's father Merovech, whose birth was associated with supernatural elements. The earliest known legal code of the Merovingian kingdom in northern Gaul was called the Salic law and it applied to the Romance speaking country between the Loire and the Silva Carbonaria, a region the Franks later called Neustria. This area was the original powerbase of Childeric and Clovis expanded the kingdom with victories over the Gallo-Romans and all the other Frankish tribes and established his capital in Paris. After he had defeated the Visigoths and the Alemanni, his sons drove the Visigoths to Spain and subdued the Burgundians, Alemanni and Thuringians. After 250 years of this dynasty, marked by internecine struggles, a gradual decline occurred. The position in society of the Merovingians was taken over by the Carolingian dynasty, who, in contrast to the Merovingians, had links to Austrasia, including areas near the river Meuse in what is now the area of eastern Belgium, the south-eastern Netherlands, and the German Rhineland, which had been associated with the Ripuarian Franks.

In Gaul, a fusion of Roman and Germanic societies was occurring. During the period of Merovingian rule, the Franks began to adopt Christianity following the baptism of Clovis I in 496, an event that inaugurated the alliance between the Frankish kingdom and the Roman Catholic Church. Unlike their Gothic, Burgundic and Lombardic counterparts, who adopted Arianism, the Salians adopted Catholic Christianity early on; giving them a relationship with the ecclesiastical hierarchy, and their subjects in conquered territories.

The division of the Frankish kingdom among Clovis’s four sons (511) was an event that would repeat in Frankish history over more than four centuries. By then, the Salic Law had established the exclusive right to succession of male descendants. This principle turned out to be an exercise in interpretation, rather than the simple implementation of a new model of succession. No trace of an established practice of territorial division can be discovered among Germanic peoples other than the Franks.

The later Merovingian kings responsible for the conquest of Gaul are thought to have had Salian ancestry, because they applied so-called Salian law (Lex Salica) in their Roman-populated territories between the Loire and Silva Carbonaria, although they also clearly had connections with the Rhineland or Ripuarian Franks. The Lex Ripuaria originated about 630 and has been described as a later development of the Frankish laws known from Lex Salica. On the other hand, following the interpretation of Springer the Lex Salica may simply have meant something like "Common Law".

== Culture ==
Apart from some isolated fragments, there is no record of the Salian Frankish language but it is presumed to be ancestral to the modern family of Low Franconian dialects, which are represented today by Dutch dialects, and Afrikaans. There are some early runic scripts been found in the Netherlands which might represent an early Frankish language, one of which is the Rune inscription of Bergakker. This inscription has led to much discussion among linguists. It is assumed that the inscription dates from around 425-450.

Before the Merovingian takeover, the Salian tribes apparently constituted a loose confederacy that only occasionally banded together, for example to negotiate with Roman authority. Each tribe consisted of extended family groups centered on a particularly renowned or noble family. The importance of the family bond was made clear by the Salic Law, which ordained that an individual had no right to protection if not part of a family.

While the Goths or the Vandals had been at least partly converted to Christianity since the mid-4th century, polytheistic beliefs are thought to have flourished among the Salian Franks until the conversion of Clovis to Catholicism shortly before or after 500, after which paganism diminished gradually. On the other hand it is possible many Salians in Gaul were already Arian Christians, like contemporary Germanic kingdoms.

== Bibliography ==
- Anderson, Thomas. 1995. "Roman Military Colonies in Gaul, Salian Ethnogenesis and the Forgotten Meaning of Pactus Legis Salicae 59.5". Early Medieval Europe 4 (2): 129–44.
- Dierkens, Alain; Périn, Patrick (2003), "The 5th-century advance of the Franks in Belgica II: history and archaeology", Essays on the Early Franks, Barkhuis, pp. 165–193
- Chisholm, Hugh, ed. (1911). "Franks" . Encyclopædia Britannica. Vol. 11 (11th ed.). Cambridge University Press. pp. 35–36.
- Halsall, Guy (2007). Barbarian Migrations and the Roman West, 376-568. Cambridge University Press.
- Harland, James (2025), "Julian's Batavian Campaign, an Embezzlement Trial in Britain, and Barbarian Access to the Annona Militaris" (PDF), Traditio, 80, doi:10.1017/tdo.2025.10022
- James, Edward (1988). The Franks. The Peoples of Europe. Oxford, UK; Cambridge, Massachusetts: Basil Blackwell. ISBN 0-631-17936-4.
- Lanting, J. N.; van der Plicht, J. (2010). "De 14C-chronologie van de Nederlandse Pre- en Protohistorie VI: Romeinse tijd en Merovische periode, deel A: historische bronnen en chronologische thema's". Palaeohistoria (in Dutch). Vol. 51/52 (2009/2010). Groningen: Groningen Institute of Archaeology. ISBN 9789077922736.
- Nonn, Ulrich (2010). Die Franken. Kohlhammer.
- Reichert, Hermann (2004), "Salier § 1. Zum Namen", in Beck, Heinrich; Geuenich, Dieter; Steuer, Heiko (eds.), Reallexikon der Germanischen Altertumskunde, vol. 26 (2 ed.), De Gruyter, pp. 343–345, ISBN 978-3-11-017734-3
- Reimitz, Helmut (2004), "Salier § 2. Historisches", in Beck, Heinrich; Geuenich, Dieter; Steuer, Heiko (eds.), Reallexikon der Germanischen Altertumskunde, vol. 26 (2 ed.), De Gruyter, pp. 345–347, ISBN 978-3-11-017734-3
- Roymans, Nico; Heeren, Stijn (2021), "Romano-Frankish interaction in the Lower Rhine frontier zone from the late 3rd to the 5th century – Some key archaeological trends explored", Germania, 99: 133–156, doi:10.11588/ger.2021.92212
- Rübekeil, Ludwig (2014). "Frühgeschichte und Sprachgeschichte in den Niederlanden". Amsterdamer Beiträge zur älteren Germanistik (in German). 71: 53–98, 72–77.
- Springer, Matthias (1997), "Gab es ein Volk der Salier?", in Geuenich, Dieter; Haubrichs, Wolfgang; Jarnut, Jörg (eds.), Nomen et gens. Zur historischen Aussagekraft frühmittelalterlicher Personennamen, Reallexikon der Germanischen Altertumskunde - Ergänzungsbände, vol. 16, De Gruyter, ISBN 978-3-11-015809-0
- Wagner, Norbert (1989), "Der Stammesname der Salier und die 'westgermanische' Konsonantengemination", Zeitschrift für deutsches Altertum und deutsche Literatur, 118: 34–42, JSTOR 20657886
- Wood, Ian (1994). The Merovingian Kingdoms, 450–751 AD.

=== Primary sources ===
- Ammianus Marcellinus, History of the Later Roman Empire.
- Gregory of Tours, Decem Libri Historiarum (Ten Books of Histories, better known as the Historia Francorum).
- Julian, Letter to the Athenians.
- Zosimus (1814): New History, London, Green and Chaplin. Book 1.
- Panegyrici Latini
