= Balderic of Montfaucon =

Saint Balderic
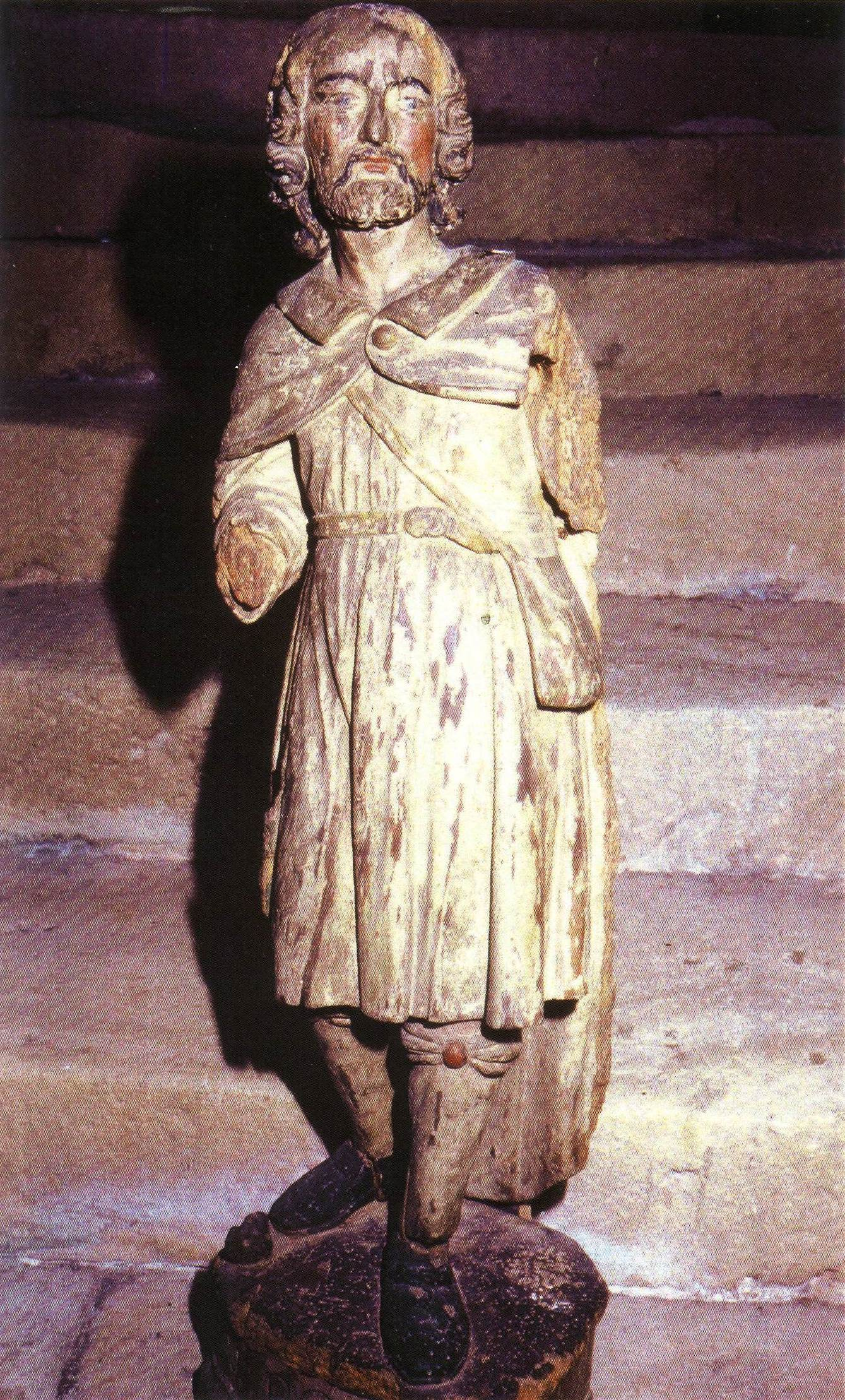

Abbot
- Died: Reims
- Venerated in: Roman Catholic Church
- Feast: 16 October

Saint Balderic (or Baudry) was the founding abbot of Montfaucon.

Balderic and his sister Beuve (or Bove or Bova) lived in the 7th century in France. They were reputed to be children of Sigebert I, king of Austrasia, based on oral tradition recorded by Flodoard, Canon of Reims, three centuries later. They are also said to be related to King Dagobert, presumably Dagobert I of Austrasia.

Balderic was ordained as a priest, and later founded the monastery of Montfaucon in the province of Lorraine. In 639 he established a convent "St-Pierre-les-Dames" in Reims for his sister Beuve. She was succeeded as abbess there by her and Balderic's niece Dode (or Doda). Balderic was a guide and tutor of Saint Wandregisel or Wandrille, who stayed at Montfaucon after separating from his wife in 628. Balderic died at Reims during a visit to his sister.

His feast day is 16 October.
