= Chlodoric the Parricide =

Son of Sigobert the Lame, a Frankish king

Chlodoric (or Chloderic) the Parricide (died c. 509) was a son of Sigobert the Lame, a Frankish king.

== History ==
According to Gregory of Tours, Chlodoric murdered his own father in order to take his kingdom of Ripuarian Franks, acting at the instigation of Clovis I, a rival king of the Salian Franks. Sometime after Sigobert's aided Clovis's victory on the Visigoths in 507, Chlodoric sent assassins upon his father as he took a sojourn in a forest near Fulda.

Chlodoric then told Clovis of the murder and offered him the finest treasures of his newly inherited kingdom as a symbol of their new alliance. Clovis sent messengers to assess the treasure, who then asked Chlodoric to plunge his hand as deeply into his gold coins as possible. With his arm submerged, the envoys of Clovis then killed the new king in betrayal. Clovis then stood before the people of Chlodoric and told them that the son had sent assassins to murder his father, but that Chlodoric had subsequently met his own end as well. Clovis then offered his protection to the former subjects of Sigobert and Chlodoric, and thus became their king.

Gregory suggests that Chlodoric was murdered in the same campaign that also killed the Frankish king Chararic. Before, Clovis had killed king Ragnachar and his brothers. After all these murders, Gregory of Tours states Clovis lamented that he had no family left anymore, implying that amongst his own casualties were close relatives.

== Sources ==
- Gregory of Tours. The History of the Franks. 2 vol. trans. O. M. Dalton. Oxford: Clarendon Press, 1967.
