= Ripuarian Franks =

Grouping of early Frankish people

Ripuarian Franks, also known as Rhenish or Rhineland Franks, and also commonly referred to using the Latin plurals Ripuarii or Ribuarii, were the Franks who established themselves in and around the formerly Roman city of Cologne, on the Rhine river in what is now Germany.

Until the 1950s the Ribuarii were seen as the easternmost of two distinct "sub tribes" of the Franks who ruled two large neighbouring regions in northern Gaul after the collapse of the Roman empire in the 5th century AD. According to this tradition, which continues to be influential, the Ribuarii ruled not just the Rhineland area near Cologne, but all or most of what would later become the Austrasian or Lotharingian region – stretching from present day southern Belgium to the Rhine in present day Germany and the Netherlands. Their western counterparts were the Salii, or "Salian Franks", who took control of what is now northern France. This traditional view of the Franks as two large tribes inhabiting different territories is mainly based on two 7th century Frankish legal codes, the Lex Ripuaria and Lex Salica. These laws refer to different geographical jurisdictions, and it was believed that the boundary between them was in the Ardennes and Silva Carbonaria in what is now southern Belgium.

Since the 1950s the term Ripuarian is no longer seen as having its origins as a tribal name, even if it eventually became the name for a specific population based in Cologne. There has also been ongoing scholarly debate about when and how the term Ripuarian was, if ever, applied to the much larger Austrasian region as opposed to the much smaller region around Cologne. The Lex Ripuaria itself is now seen mainly as a law code of the Cologne Rhineland covering such neighbouring towns as Bonn, Zülpich, Jülich and Neuss.

== History of the term "Ripuarii" ==
Before the Lex Ripuaria there is a possible mention of the Ripuarii in the 6th-century Byzantine writer Jordanes. In his account of the Battle of the Catalaunian Plains in 451 AD he referred to the Riparii among the units fighting as auxiliaries under the Roman Aetius, against Attila. They are listed together with forces with ethnic designations including Franks, Sarmatians, Armoricans, Burgundians, Saxons. Eugen Ewig argued that these Riparii are not from Cologne, but rather a military unit mentioned in the Notitia Dignitatum, who based on the Rhône river in what is now southern France. Springer however argues against this interpretation, noting that at least three of those four units were naval units, the classis fluminis Rhodani, the classis barcariorum, and the milites musculariorum.

The legal code itself is generally seen as having been made in the 7th century, although it has been argued for example by Springer that it may have been made as late as the early 8th century. It was probably made in the context of the establishment of an Austrasian sub-kingdom by the Merovingians in 623 or 633 AD, possibly as part of a reorganization of the border defence of this kingdom on the Rhine. The Ribuarian area was referred to in Latin using different terms, provincia, ducatus, and regnum and it included the areas around Cologne, Bonn, the Eifel, Zülpich, Jülich, and Neuss. It has been argued that the legal code reveals a deliberate process of "ethnic engineering", aiming to create a Romano-Frankish mixed civilization. According to Springer only the younger manuscripts of the Ribuarian Law Book refer to it as Lex Ribuariorum, named after a people, instead of Lex Ribuaria, named after a country.

Apart from the 7th-century legal code, the earliest narrative source definitely containing a form of the word ribuarius for the people of Cologne is the Liber Historiae Francorum, which was completed about 726/27 AD. The author uses the term terra Riboariense to describe the land (terra) around Cologne which were devastated in 612 AD by the Merovingian king Theuderic II, who defeated his brother Theudebert II at Zülpich and then pursued him to Cologne. After his victory there the author says that the king claimed that one of the "Ribuarians" (Riboariis) in Cologne shot at him. The word was therefore pronounced with a b-like sound at this time and used both as an adjective and a noun, referring to both the region of Cologne, and its inhabitants.

Since the 1950s it has been widely accepted that the plural Ripuarii or Ribuarii, referring to Franks from the Cologne region, did not originate as the name of any Germanic tribe who moved in the so-called Migration period before the 7th century. Instead the name seems to have been connected to the region they moved to. A traditional explanation for the first part of the word comes from Latin rīpa meaning a seashore or riverbank, which is believed to refer in this case to the river Rhine, which runs past Cologne. This explanation remains popular although there is ongoing debate among scholars, both about whether the name is purely derived from Latin, and about whether the name was really intended to refer to the Rhine riverbank.

Latin formations such as ripa-rius, rip-arius, and rip-uarius would all be possible Latin-derived words describing a person of the riverbank, but purely Latin explanations of the word are generally avoided among scholars, because the second part of the name seems to be the same as the suffix found in several other Germanic tribal names such as the Ampsivarii, Chasuarii, and Angrivarii. This suffix -varii is normally believed to come not originally from Latin, but from a Germanic word meaning inhabitants. A version of this suffix is for example found in Old English, in words like Rōmware, meaning inhabitants of Rome.

Another reason to doubt direct borrowing from Latin is that the earliest spelling of the word uses a b instead of the p, which would be expected in classical Latin. Furthermore, later spellings show that the word was being pronounced by Germanic speakers with a w-like sound. Springer argued that this is evidence that the word came from Gallo-Romance, the Latin-derived language from which modern French derives, where such changes from p to b were normal in this period. According to this account, Germanic speakers in the Cologne area pronounced the b as a w-like voiced bilabial fricative, β. Frank, in contrast, notes that the move from p to b could also be explained as a typical sound change which happened among Germanic speakers in this time, but accepts that the word could have had a Gallo-Romance origin.

Springer also questioned whether the word derived directly from the word from a river bank, noting that in various parts of the late Roman empire the word riparius was used to refer to people with military or policing functions. Although the term is presumed to have derived originally from the word for a riverbank, because of the connection of these people to border regions, Springer and others note that well before the end of the Roman Empire it became a word for certain policing units, perhaps connected to toll collection, and the word was no longer always connected to rivers. Springer proposes therefore that the people of Cologne owed their special name to a unit of Roman border police who had been posted there before the Franks took over.

Ripuarian designations were used in various sources from Carolingian and post-Carolingian era, such as the Annals of Saint Bertin, the Annals of Fulda, and also in some other sources from those periods. An example of the terms being used to refer to a larger area is known from the 9th century. The Annals of Xanten referred to king Lothar II (855-869) as king of the Ripuarians, or of Ripuaria (rex Ripuariorum and rex Ripuariae). His short-lived kingdom, that became known as Lotharingia, was a new construction similar to Austrasia. Similarly, in the 11th century, when the term was becoming more unusual, Wipo of Burgundy mentioned the inhabitants of Lower Lotharingia as Ripuarians (Latin: Ribuarii), and their duke as duke of the Ripuarians (Latin: dux Ribuariorum).

== Kingdom of Cologne ==
The Frankish kingdom of Cologne lost its independence almost as soon as it entered the historical record, being subsumed in the Frankish core province of Austrasia. Apart from Roman military lists and a mention by Jordanes in his Getica of some unknown Ripuarii who fought as auxiliaries of Flavius Aetius in the Battle of Chalons in 451, the first mention of the Cologne kingdom comes from Gregory of Tours, in Historia Francorum. He says that the Salian Frank Clovis, first king of all the Franks and first king to convert to Christianity, subjected the previously Franks from the Cologne region.

Without naming the people as Ripuarian, but referring to Cologne and its vicinity, Gregory of Tours explains how they voluntarily gave up their sovereignty to Clovis. The region of Cologne was under the rule of Sigobert the Lame, an old campaigner who had fought side by side with Clovis in the wars against the Alamanni. He was called "the lame" because of a wound he had received at the Battle of Tolbiac, 496, the same year as Clovis' conversion to Catholicism. Clovis believed he had won by calling on the name of Christ and now had a mandate from God to Christianize all Neustria. This was a long process not free from resistance.

In 509 he sent a messenger to Chloderic to state that if his father, Sigobert, were to die, he, Clovis, would ally himself to Chloderic. Whatever Clovis may have meant, as Sigobert was sleeping at noon in his tent in the forest across the Rhine from Cologne after a walk, Chloderic's hired assassins killed him. Chloderic sent to Clovis offering some of Sigobert's treasury as enticement. Clovis sent messengers refusing the treasure but asked to see it. Complying with their request to sink his arms into it so that they could see how deep it was, Chloderic was dispatched by the blow of an axe, unable to defend himself.

Arriving in person Clovis assembled the citizens of Cologne, denied the murders, saying "It is not for me to shed the blood of one of my fellow kings, for that is a crime …" He advised them to place themselves under his protection, after which he was shouted into office by a voice vote and raised up on their shields in a ceremony of installation. Thus the independent kingdom of the Cologne Franks was voted out of existence by the people at a single assembly in 509.

== Language ==
There are no direct attestations of the early Frankish language. Of some 1,400 Latin inscriptions in Roman Germania Inferior a little over 100 are from the rural lands of the Germanic Ubii, into whose lands the Ripuarii would move. The inscriptions are most frequent in the 3rd century. Most are from the major cities of Germania Inferior. The right bank of the Rhine, where the Ripuarii originated, does not have such a wealth of Latin inscriptions. The High German consonant shift occurred south of an east-west zone called the Benrath Line. The Rhine crosses it in the vicinity of Düsseldorf. The section of the Rhine including Cologne forms the so-called "Rhenish Fan", where dialects are found which form intermediate stages between Dutch and High German.

== Ripuarian laws ==
In the first half of the 7th century the Ripuarians received the Ripuarian law (Lex Ripuaria), a law code applying only to them, from the dominating Salian Franks. The Salians, following the custom of the Romans before them, were mainly re-authorizing laws already in use by the Ripuarians, so that the latter could retain their local constitution.

== See also ==
- Franks
- Salian Franks
- List of Germanic tribes

== Sources ==
- Fanning, Steven; Bachrach, Bernard S., eds. (2004). The Annals of Flodoard of Reims, 916-966. Toronto: Broadview Press.
- Esders, Stefan (2010), "Lex Ribuaria", in Brather, Sebastian; Heizmann, Wilhelm; Patzold, Steffen (eds.), Germanische Altertumskunde Online, De Gruyter (updated online version of older print article)
- Frank, Irmgard (2003), "Ribuarier", in Beck, Heinrich; Geuenich, Dieter; Steuer, Heiko (eds.), Reallexikon der Germanischen Altertumskunde, vol. 24 (2 ed.), De Gruyter, pp. 563–568, ISBN 978-3-11-017575-2
- MacLean, Simon (2013). "Shadow Kingdom: Lotharingia and the Frankish World, c. 850–c. 1050". History Compass. 11 (6): 443–457.
- Nelson, Janet L., ed. (1991). The Annals of St-Bertin. Manchester: Manchester University Press.
- Reuter, Timothy, ed. (1992). The Annals of Fulda. Manchester: Manchester University Press. ISBN 9780719034589.
- Rivers, Theodore John. (1986) Laws of the Salian and Ripuarian Franks. New York: AMS Press, 1986.
- Springer, Matthias (1998), "Riparii - Ribuarier - Rheinfranken", in Geuenich, Dieter (ed.), Die Franken und die Alemannen bis zur "Schlacht bei Zülpich" (496/97) (in German), Berlin; New York: De Gruyter, pp. 200–268, ISBN 978-3-11-015826-7
- Springer, Matthias (2003), "Ribuarier", in Beck, Heinrich; Geuenich, Dieter; Steuer, Heiko (eds.), Reallexikon der Germanischen Altertumskunde, vol. 24 (2 ed.), De Gruyter, pp. 569–574, ISBN 978-3-11-017575-2
- Wiggers, Heiko (2007). Reevaluating diglossia: Data from Low German (Dissertation). Ann Arbor.
