= Lex Ripuaria =

7th-century collection of Frankish law

The Lex Ripuaria, also spelled Lex Ribuaria, is a 7th-century collection of Germanic law, the laws of the Ripuarian Franks. It is a major influence on the Lex Saxonum of AD 802. The Lex Ripuaria originated about 630 around Cologne and has been described as a later development of the Frankish laws known from Lex Salica.

The 35 surviving manuscripts, as well as those now lost which served as the basis of the old editions, do not go back beyond the time of Charlemagne. In all these manuscripts the text is identical, but it is a revised text - in other words, we have only a lex emendata. On analysis, the law of the Ripuarians, which contains 89 chapters, falls into three heterogeneous divisions. Chapters 1-31 consist of a scale of compositions; but, although the fines are calculated, not on the unit of 15 solidi, as in the Salic Law, but on that of 18 solidi, it is clear that this part is already influenced by the Salic Law. Chapters 32-64 are taken directly from the Salic Law; the provisions follow the same arrangement; the unit of the compositions is 15 solidi; but capitularies are interpolated relating to the affranchisement and sale of immovable property. Chapters 65-89 consist of provisions of various kinds, some taken from lost capitularies and from the Salic Law, and others of unknown origin.

The compilation apparently goes back to the reign of Dagobert I (629-639), to a time when the power of the mayors of the palace was still minimal, since we read of a mayor being threatened with the death penalty for taking bribes in the course of his judicial duties. It is probable, however, that the first two parts are older than the third. Already in the Ripuarian Law the divergences from the old Germanic law are greater than in the Salic Law. In the Ripuarian Law a certain importance attaches to written deeds; the clergy are protected by a higher wergild: 600 solidi for a priest, and 900 for a bishop; on the other hand, more space is given to the cojuratores (sworn witnesses); and the appearance of the judicial duel is noted, which is not mentioned in the Salic Law.

== Editions ==
- R. Sohm, "Monumenta Germaniae", Leges V (1883)

== See also ==
- Paris, BN, lat. 4404
- Lex Salica
