= Clovis I =

King of the Franks from 481 to 511

Clovis I *Hlodowig
- Patricius and honorary Consul
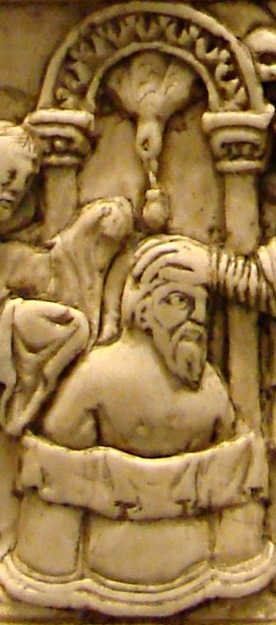
- Baptism of Clovis, ivory book cover from c. 870

King of the Franks
- Reign: c. 509 – 27 November 511
- Successor: See list: Theuderic I (Reims) Chlodomer (Orléans) Childebert I (Paris) Chlothar I (Soissons)

King of the Salian Franks
- Reign: c. 481 – 509
- Predecessor: Childeric I
- Born: c. 466
- Died: 27 November 511 (aged about 45); Paris, Francia
- Burial: Originally St. Genevieve Church; now Saint-Denis Basilica
- Spouse: Clotilde
- Issue: Ingomer; Chlodomer; Childebert I; Chlothar I; Clotilde; Theuderic I
- Dynasty: Merovingian
- Father: Childeric I
- Mother: Basina of Thuringia
- Religion: Chalcedonian Christianity prev. Frankish paganism

Clovis I (Latin: Chlodovechus; reconstructed Frankish: *Hlodowig c. 466 – 27 November 511) was the first Frankish king to unite the Franks, changing the form of leadership from a group of petty kings to rule by a single king, and ensuring that the kingship was passed down to his heirs. He is considered the founder of the Merovingian dynasty, which ruled the Frankish kingdom for the next two centuries. Clovis is an important figure in the history of France. According to Charles de Gaulle, he was "the first king of what would become France." (Note: General Charles de Gaulle is cited in Schoenbrun (1965, p. 40) as having said "For me, the history of France begins with Clovis, elected as king of France by the tribe of the Franks, who gave their name to France. Before Clovis, we have Gallo-Roman and Gaulish prehistory. The decisive element, for me, is that Clovis was the first king to have been baptized a Christian. My country is a Christian country and I reckon the history of France beginning with the accession of a Christian king who bore the name of the Franks." (Pour moi, l'histoire de France commence avec Clovis, choisi comme roi de France par la tribu des Francs, qui donnèrent leur nom à la France. Avant Clovis, nous avons la Préhistoire gallo-romaine et gauloise. L'élément décisif pour moi, c'est que Clovis fut le premier roi à être baptisé chrétien. Mon pays est un pays chrétien et je commence à compter l'histoire de France à partir de l'accession d'un roi chrétien qui porte le nom des Francs.))

Clovis succeeded his father, Childeric I, as a king of the Salian Franks in 481, and eventually came to rule an area extending from what is now the southern Netherlands to northern France, corresponding in Roman terms to Gallia Belgica (northern Gaul). At the Battle of Soissons (486), he established control over a rump state of the fragmenting Western Roman Empire, which was under the command of Syagrius. By the time of his death in 511, Clovis had conquered several smaller Frankish kingdoms in the northeast of Gaul, stretching into what is now Germany. Clovis also conquered the Alemanni in eastern Gaul and the Visigothic kingdom of Aquitania in the southwest. These campaigns added significantly to his Frankish domains and established his dynasty as a major political and military presence in western Europe.

Clovis is also significant because of his baptism between 498 and 506, largely at the behest of his wife, Clotilde, who would later be venerated as a saint for this act, celebrated today in both the Catholic Church and Eastern Orthodox Church. The adoption of Catholicism (as opposed to the Arianism of most other Germanic tribes) by Clovis led to widespread conversions among the Franks, and eventually to religious unification across what is now modern-day France, the Low Countries and Germany. The alliance between the Franks and Catholicism eventually led to Charlemagne's crowning by the Pope as emperor in 800, and to the subsequent birth of the early Holy Roman Empire in the middle of the 10th century.

== Name ==
Based on the attested forms, the Frankish name is generally reconstructed as *Hlodowig. The commonly accepted interpretation derives it from two Proto-Germanic elements,*hlūdaz ('loud, famous') and *wiganą ('to battle, to fight'), which underlies the traditional translation of Clovis's name as 'famous warrior' or 'renowned in battle'.

Linguist Reinder van der Meulen has questioned whether the traditional derivation from Proto-Germanic hlūd- ('famous') fully accounts for the vocalism found in the Merovingian forms. He notes that Gregory of Tours consistently writes Chlodo- with 'o', even though he uses 'u' elsewhere for names that etymologically contain u (e.g., Fredegundis, Guntchramnus, Arnulfus). On this basis, van der Meulen proposes that the first element might instead reflect a stem lod- ('to take booty, to plunder'), which would yield an interpretation of *Hlodowig as 'warrior for booty'. He further suggests that this interpretation would avoid the semantic redundancy that would occur in the name Chlodomer if both elements (traditionally analysed as hlūd- and -mērijaz, each meaning 'famous') were assumed to belong to the same semantic field.

In Middle Dutch, a language descended from Frankish, the name was rendered as Lodewijch (cf. modern Dutch Lodewijk). (Note: The second element corresponds to Middle High German wîc, with final-obstruent devoicing, as in Ludewic. The Middle Dutch form is wijch (modern Dutch wijg, as in original Dutch.) The name is found in other West Germanic languages, with cognates including Old English Hloðwig, Old Saxon Hluduco, and Old High German Hludwīg (variant Hluotwīg). The latter turned into Ludwig in Modern German, although the king Clovis himself is generally named Chlodwig. The Old Norse form Hlǫðvér was most likely borrowed from a West Germanic language.

The Frankish name *Hlodowig is at the origin of the French given name Louis (variant Ludovic), borne by 18 kings of France, via the Latinized form Hludovicus (variants Ludhovicus, Lodhuvicus, or Chlodovicus). The English Lewis stems from the Anglo-French Louis.

== Background ==
Clovis was the son of Childeric I, a king of the Salian Franks, and Basina, a Thuringian princess. The dynasty he founded is, however, named after Clovis' supposed grandfather, Merovech. Later legends created a genealogy that linked the Merovingians to the Trojan War.

Numerous small Frankish petty kingdoms existed by the 5th century. In the year 358, the Salian Franks was the first known Frankish tribe that settled with official Roman permission, at Toxandria (near the North Brabant province of the modern Netherlands). The Salian Franks lived by shores of the North Sea, while the Ripuarian Franks, a neighboring tribe, lived on the banks of the Rhine. Around 430, Chlodio attacked westwards from this area to take control of Tournai, then southwards to Artois, and Cambrai, eventually controlling an area stretching to the Somme river.

Childeric I, Clovis's father, was reputed to be a relative of Chlodio and was known as the king of the Franks who fought as an army within northern Gaul. In 463, he fought in conjunction with Aegidius, the magister militum of northern Gaul, to defeat the Visigoths in Orléans. Childeric died in 481 and Clovis succeeded him as king, aged just 15. Historians believe that Childeric and Clovis were both commanders of the Roman military in the province of Belgica Secunda, and were subordinate to the magister militum. The Franks of Tournai came to dominate their neighbours, initially aided by the association with Aegidius.

The death of Aetius in 454 led to the decline of imperial power in Gaul, leaving the Visigoths and the Burgundians competing for predominance in the area. The Western Roman Empire was reduced to Italy and a few territories, and imperial rule in the West finally ended with the deposition of Romulus Augustulus in 476. The parts of Gaul controlled Syagrius, Aegidius's son, became what is now known as the Kingdom of Soissons.

Though no primary sources expounding on the language spoken by Clovis exist, historical linguists consider it likely that, based on his family history and core territories, he spoke a form of Old Dutch. In this, the early Merovingians can be contrasted with the later Carolingians, such as Charlemagne, of the late 8th century and onward, who probably spoke various forms of Old High German.

== Early reign (481–491) ==
=== Road to Soissons ===
In 486, Clovis began his efforts to expand the realm by allying himself with his relative Ragnachar, king of Cambrai and another Frankish king, Chararic. These rulers are sometimes referred to as regulus (diminutive of rex). Together the triumvirate marched against Syagrius and met the Gallo-Roman commander at Soissons. During the battle, Chararic betrayed his comrades by refusing to take part in the fighting. Despite the betrayal, the Franks landed a decisive victory, forcing Syagrius to flee to the court of Alaric II. This battle is viewed as bringing about the end of the rump state of the Western Roman Empire outside of Italy. Following the battle, Clovis invaded the traitor Chararic's territory and was able to imprison him and his son.

=== Uniting Gaul ===
Conquests of Clovis between 481 and 511

Prior to the battle, Clovis did not enjoy the support of the Gallo-Roman clergy, so he proceeded to pillage the Roman territory, including the churches. The Bishop of Reims requested Clovis return everything taken from the Church of Reims; the young king aspired to establish cordial relationships with the clergy, so he returned a valuable ewer taken from the church. Despite his position, some Roman cities refused to yield to the Franks, namely Verdun ‒ which surrendered after a brief siege ‒ and Paris, which stubbornly resisted for a few years, perhaps as many as five. He made Paris his capital and established an abbey dedicated to Saints Peter and Paul on the south bank of the Seine. (Note: The abbey was later renamed Sainte-Geneviève Abbey, in honor of the patron saint of Paris, and was demolished in 1802. All that remains is the "Tour Clovis", a Romanesque tower that now lies within the grounds of the Lycée Henri-IV, just east of The Panthéon, and the parish Saint-Étienne-du-Mont, which was built on the abbey territory.)

Realizing that he would not be able to rule Gaul without the help of the clergy, Clovis took a Catholic wife to please them. He also integrated many of Syagrius's units into his own army. The Roman kingdom was probably under Clovis's control by 491 because in the same year, Clovis allegedly moved against a small number of Thuringians in eastern Gaul, near the Burgundian border.

== Middle reign (492–506) ==
=== Barbarian Relations ===
Around 493 AD, he secured an alliance with the Ostrogoths through the marriage of his sister Audofleda to their king, Theodoric the Great. In the same year, the neighboring King of the Burgundians was slain by his brother, Gundobad; bringing civil strife to that kingdom. Allegedly, Gundobad proceeded to drown his sister-in-law and force his niece, Chrona, into a convent. Another niece, Clotilde, fled to the court of the third brother, Godegisel. Finding himself in a precarious position, Godegisel decided to ally himself to Clovis by marrying his exiled niece to the Frankish king.

=== Assault of the Alamanni ===
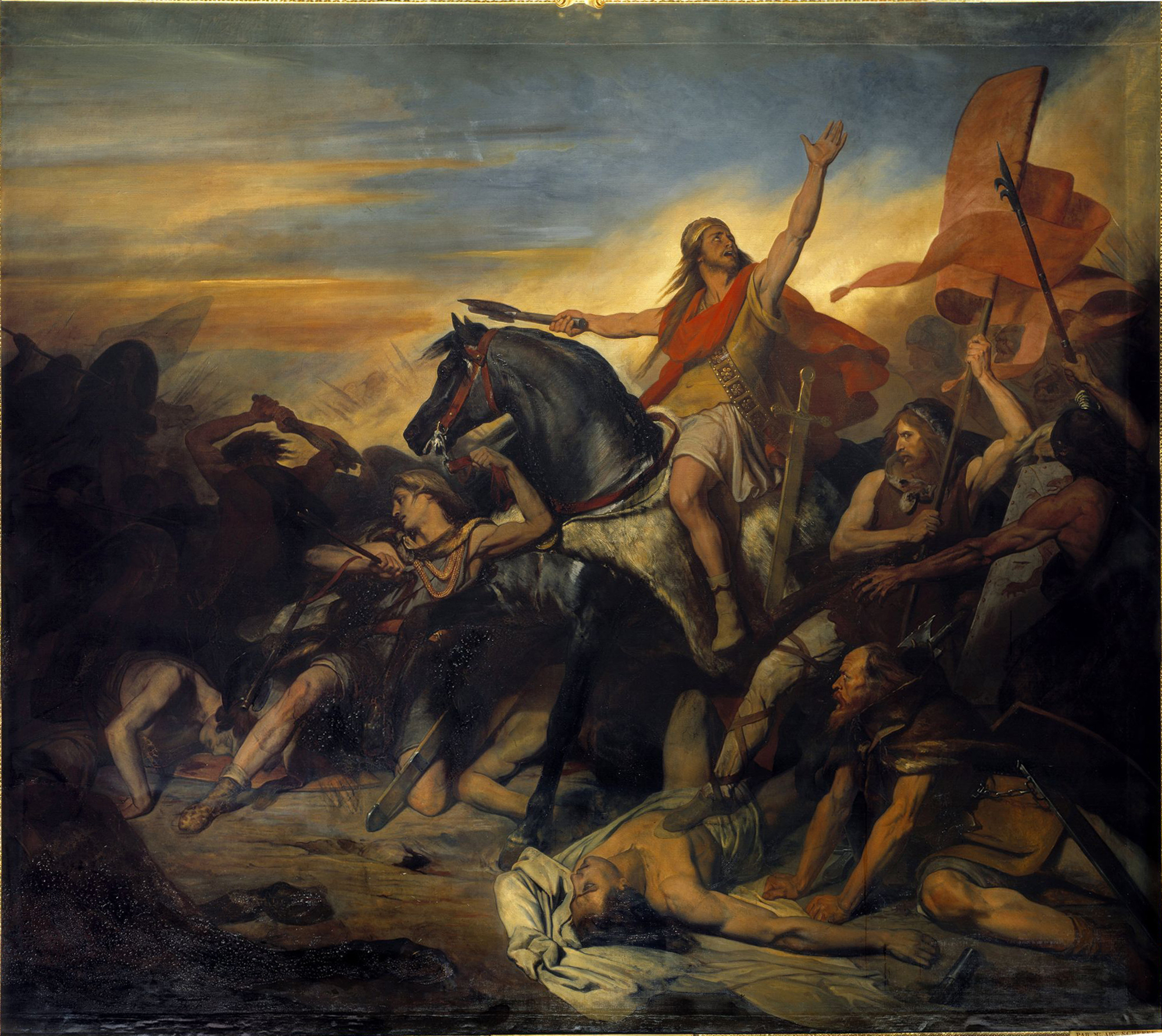
Clovis I leading the Franks to victory in the Battle of Tolbiac, in Ary Scheffer's 1836 painting

In 496, the Alamanni invaded and some Salians and Ripuarians reguli (kings) defected to their side. Clovis met his enemies near the strong fort of Tolbiac. During the fighting, the Franks suffered heavy losses. Clovis, together with over three thousand Frankish companions, may have converted to Christianity around this time. With the help of the Ripuarian Franks he narrowly defeated the Alamanni in the Battle of Tolbiac in 496. Now Christian, Clovis confined his prisoners, Chararic and his son, to a monastery.

=== Relations with Burgundy ===
In 500 or 501, Godegisel began scheming against his brother Gundobad. He promised his brother-in-law territory and annual tribute for defeating his brother. Clovis was eager to subdue the political threat to his realm and crossed into the Burgundian territory. Gundobad then moved against Clovis and called his brother for reinforcements. The three armies met near Dijon, where both the Franks and Godegisel's forces defeated the dumbfounded Gundobad, who escaped to Avignon. Clovis pursued him and laid siege to the city. After some months, Clovis was convinced to abandon the siege and settled for an annual tribute from Gundobad.

=== Armorici allies ===
In 501, 502 or 503, Clovis led his troops to Armorica. He had previously restricted his operations to minor raids, but now the goal was subjugation. Clovis failed to complete this objective via military means; therefore, he was constrained to statecraft. This proved fruitful, for the Armonici shared Clovis's disdain for the Arian Visigoths. Armorica and its fighters were thus integrated into the Frankish realm.

== Late reign (507–511) ==
=== Relations with the Visigoths ===
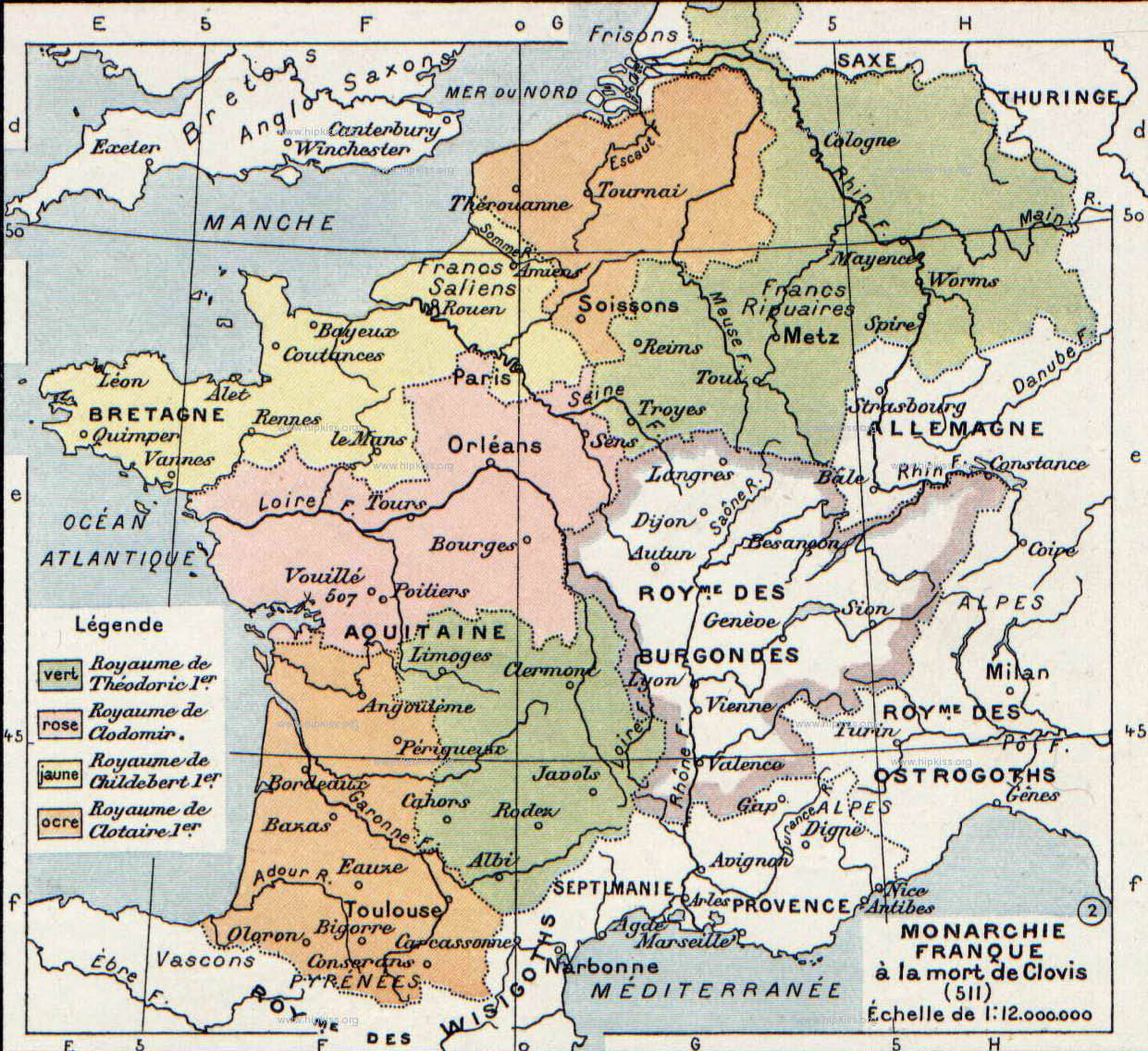
Frankish territories at the time of Clovis's death in 511

In 507 Clovis was allowed by the magnates of his realm to invade the remaining threat of the Kingdom of the Visigoths. King Alaric had previously tried to establish a cordial relationship with Clovis by serving him the head of exiled Syagrius on a silver plate in 486 or 487. However, Clovis was no longer able to resist the temptation to move against the Visigoths, for many Catholics under Visigoth yoke were unhappy and implored Clovis to make a move. But just to be absolutely certain about retaining the loyalties of the Christians under Visigoths, Clovis ordered his troops to omit raiding and plunder, for this was not a foreign invasion, but a liberation.

The Visigothic Kingdom of Toulouse was defeated at the Battle of Vouillé in 507, resuting in the death of Visigothic king Alaric II and the end of Visigothic power in Gaul. According to Gregory of Tours, following the battle the Byzantine Emperor Anastasius I made Clovis a patrician and honorary consul.

=== Unifying the Franks ===
Following the Battle of Vouillé, Clovis eliminated all his possible rivals, including the other Frankish kings who ruled alongside him. Sometime after 507, Clovis heard about Chararic's plan to escape from his monastic prison and had him murdered. Around the same time, Clovis convinced Prince Chlodoric to murder his father Sigobert, earning him his nickname as "Chlodoric the Parricide". Following the murder, Clovis betrayed Chlodoric and had his envoys strike him down. Sometime later, Clovis visited his old ally Ragnachar in Cambrai. Following his conversion to Christianity in 508, many of Clovis's pagan retainers had defected to Ragnachar's side, making him a political threat. Ragnachar denied Clovis's entry, prompting Clovis to make a move against him. He bribed Ragnachar's retainers and executed him alongside his brother Ricchar.

=== Death ===
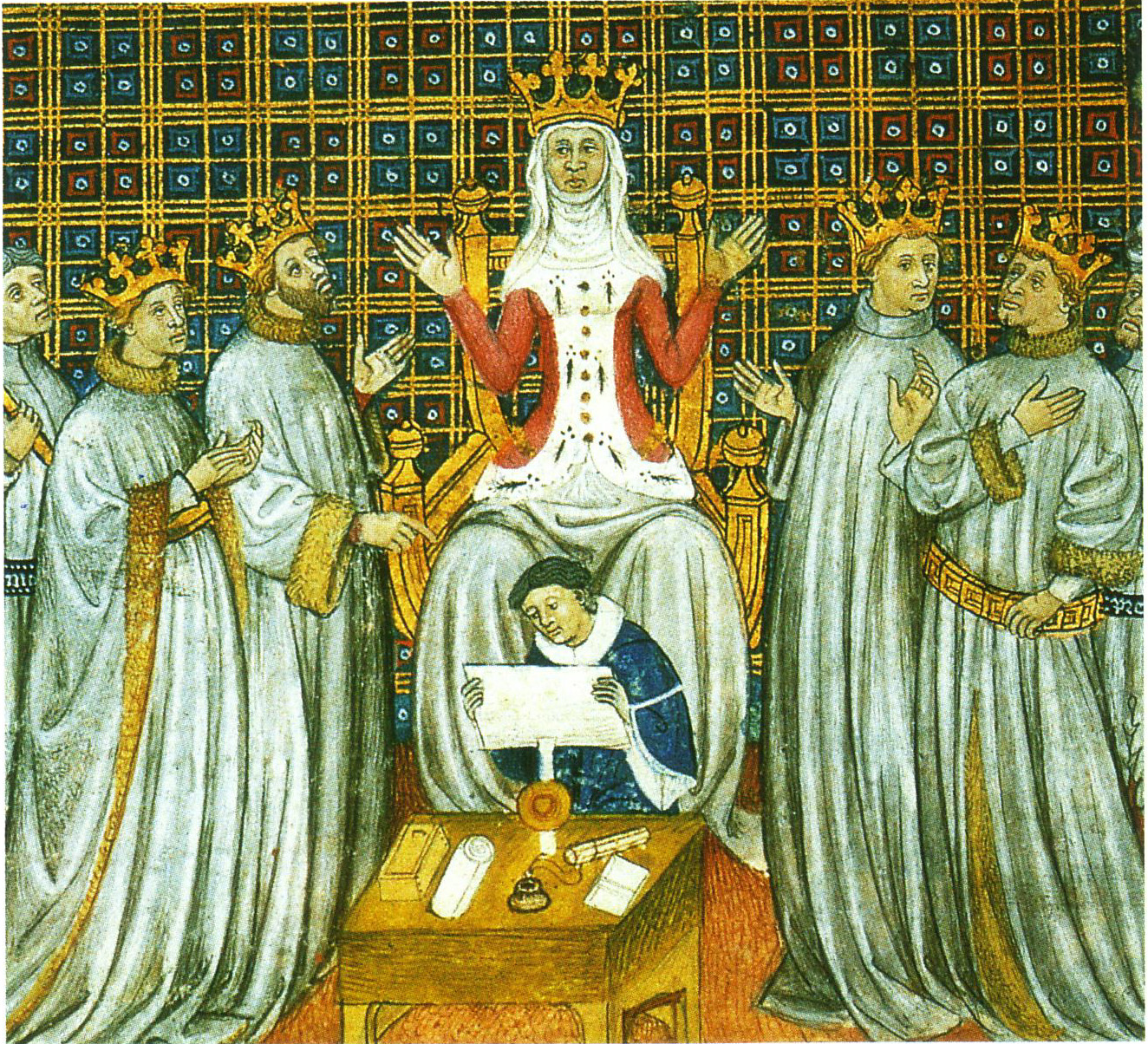
The partition of the Frankish kingdom among the four sons of Clovis with Clotilde presiding, Grandes Chroniques de Saint-Denis (Bibliothèque municipale de Toulouse)

Shortly before his death, Clovis called a synod of Gallic bishops to meet in Orléans to reform the Church and create a strong link between the Crown and the Catholic episcopate. This was the First Council of Orléans. Thirty-three bishops assisted and passed 31 decrees on the duties and obligations of individuals, the right of sanctuary, and ecclesiastical discipline. These decrees, equally applicable to Franks and Romans, first established equality between conquerors and conquered. Clovis died in 511 and was laid to rest in the Abbey of Saint Genevieve in Paris.

His remains were relocated to Saint Denis Basilica in the mid- to late 18th century. When Clovis died, his kingdom was partitioned among his four sons, Theuderic (who was born to an earlier concubine), Chlodomer, Childebert and Clotaire. This partition created the new political units of the Kingdoms of Rheims, Orléans, Paris and Soissons (respectively), and inaugurated a tradition that would lead to disunity lasting until the end of the Merovingian dynasty in 751. Clovis had been a king with no fixed capital and no central administration beyond his entourage. By deciding to be interred at Paris, Clovis gave the city symbolic weight. When his grandchildren divided royal power 50 years after his death, Paris was kept as a joint property and a fixed symbol of the dynasty.

The disunity continued under the Carolingians until, after a brief unity under Charlemagne, the Franks splintered into distinct spheres of cultural influence that coalesced around Eastern and Western centers of royal power. These later political, linguistic, and cultural entities became the Kingdom of France, the Kingdom of Germany (itself a myriad of German states), and the semi-autonomous realms of Burgundy and the short-lived Lotharingia.

== Baptism ==
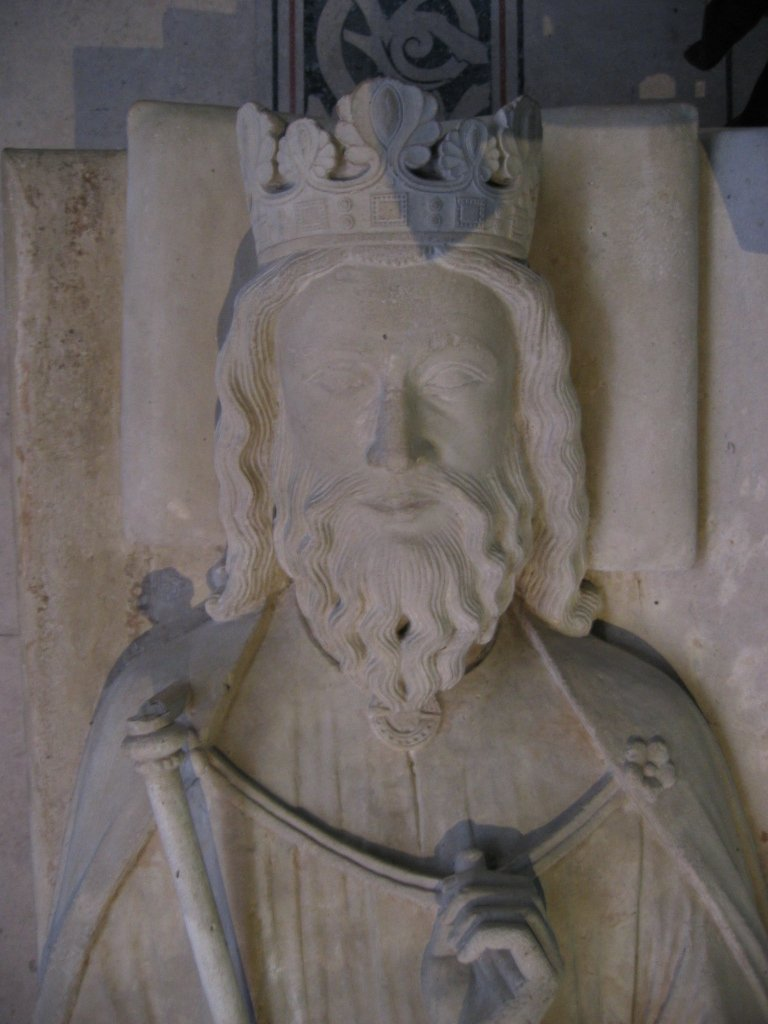
Tomb of Clovis I at the Basilica of Saint Denis in Saint Denis

Clovis was born a pagan but later became interested in converting to Arian Christianity, whose followers believed that Jesus was a distinct and separate being from God the Father, both subordinate to and created by him. This contrasted with Nicene Christianity, whose followers believe that God the Father, Jesus, and the Holy Spirit are three persons of one being (consubstantiality). While the theology of the Arians was declared a heresy at the First Council of Nicea in 325, the missionary work of Bishop Ulfilas converted a significant portion of the pagan Goths to Arian Christianity in the 4th century. By the time of the ascension of Clovis, Gothic Arians dominated Christian Gaul, and Nicene Christians were the minority.

Clovis's wife Clotilde, a Burgundian princess, was a Nicene Christian despite the Arianism that surrounded her at court. Her persistence eventually persuaded Clovis to convert to Nicene Christianity, which he initially resisted. Clotilde had wanted her son to be baptized, but Clovis refused, so she had the child baptized without Clovis's knowledge. Shortly after his baptism, their son died, which further strengthened Clovis's resistance to conversion. Clotilde also had their second son baptized without her husband's permission, and this son became ill and nearly died after his baptism. Clovis eventually converted to Nicene Christianity (Catholicism) on Christmas Day, though the exact year is a matter of debate with plausible suggestions by scholars being 498–506. in a small church in the vicinity of the subsequent Abbey of Saint-Remi in Reims; a statue of his baptism by Saint Remigius can still be seen there. The details of this event have been passed down by Gregory of Tours, who recorded them many years later in the 6th century.

The king's Nicene baptism was of immense importance in the subsequent history of Western and Central Europe in general, as Clovis expanded his dominion over almost all of Gaul. Catholicism offered certain advantages to Clovis as he fought to distinguish his rule among many competing power centers in Western Europe. His conversion to the Nicene form of Christianity served to set him apart from most other Germanic kings of his time, such as those of the Visigoths and the Vandals, who had converted from Germanic paganism to Arian Christianity. However, he was not the first Germanic king to convert to Nicene Christianity, that distinction belonging to the Suevic king of Gallaecia Rechiar, whose conversion predates Clovis's baptism by half a century. Nevertheless, Clovis's embrace of the Catholic faith may have also gained him the support of the Catholic Gallo-Roman aristocracy in his later campaign against the Visigoths, which drove them from southern Gaul in 507 and resulted in a great many of his people converting to Catholicism as well.

On the other hand, Bernard Bachrach has argued that his conversion from Frankish paganism alienated many of the other Frankish sub-kings and weakened his military position over the next few years. In the interpretatio romana, Saint Gregory of Tours gave the Germanic gods that Clovis abandoned the names of roughly equivalent Roman gods, such as Jupiter and Mercury. William Daly, more directly assessing Clovis's allegedly barbaric and pagan origins, ignored the Gregory of Tours version and based his account on the scant earlier sources, a sixth-century "vita" of Saint Genevieve and letters to or concerning Clovis from bishops (now in the Epistolae Austrasicae) and Theodoric.

Clovis and his wife were buried in the Abbey of St Genevieve (St. Pierre) in Paris; the original name of the church was the Church of the Holy Apostles.

== Roman law ==
Under Clovis, the first codification of the Salian Frank law took place. The Roman Law was written with the assistance of Gallo-Romans to reflect the Salic legal tradition and Christianity, while containing much from Roman tradition. The Roman Law lists various crimes as well as the fines associated with them.

== Legacy ==
The legacy of Clovis's conquests, a Frankish kingdom that included most of Roman Gaul and parts of western Germany, survived long after his death. To many French people, he is the founder of the modern French state.

Detracting, perhaps, from this legacy, is his aforementioned division of the state. This was done not along national or even largely geographical lines, but primarily to assure equal income amongst his sons after his death. While it may or may not have been his intention, this division was the cause of much internal discord in Gaul. This precedent led, in the long run, to the fall of his dynasty, for it was a pattern repeated in future reigns. Clovis did bequeath to his heirs the support of both people and the Church such that when the magnates were ready to do away with the royal house, the sanction of the Pope was sought first.

Images of the King

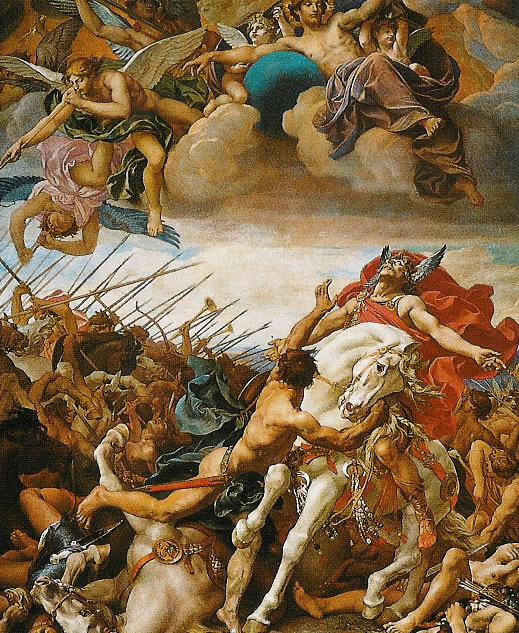
Battle of Tolbiac. Fresco at the Panthéon (Paris) by Joseph Blanc, circa 1881

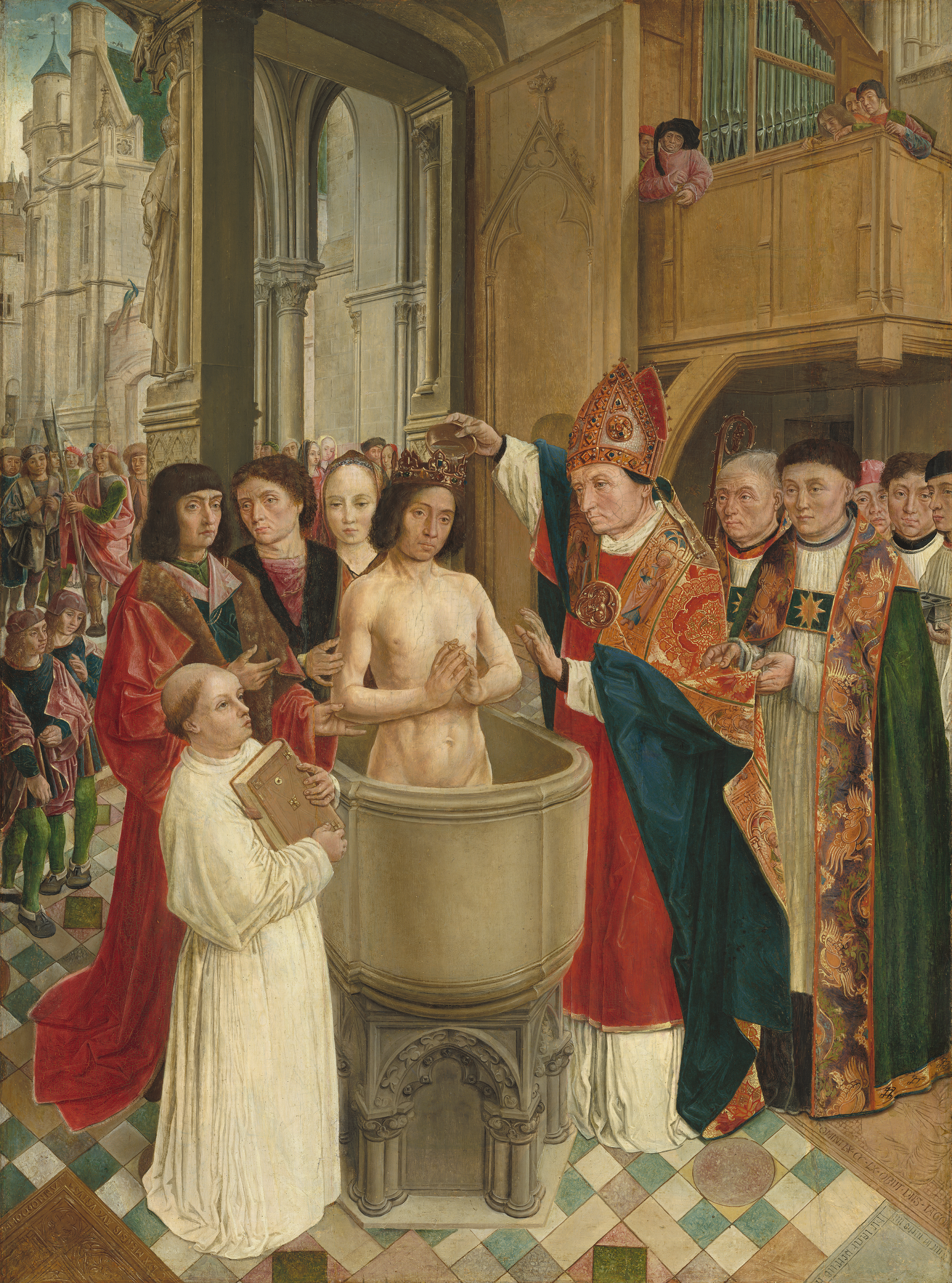
Saint Remigius baptizes Clovis, in a painting of c. 1500

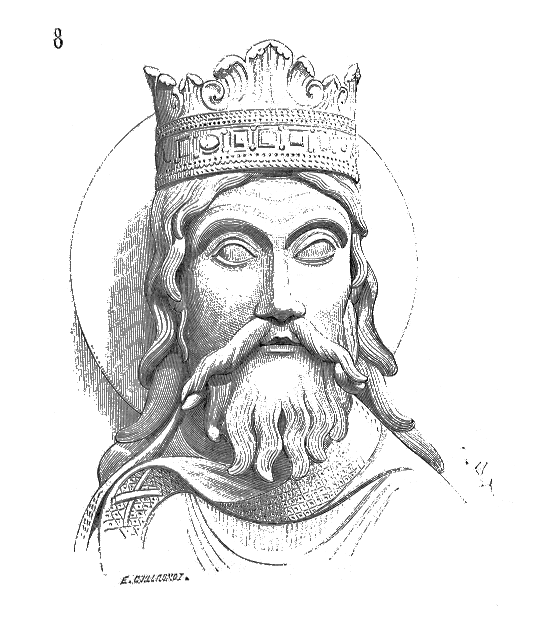
Clovis statue at the Abbey Church of Saint-Denis

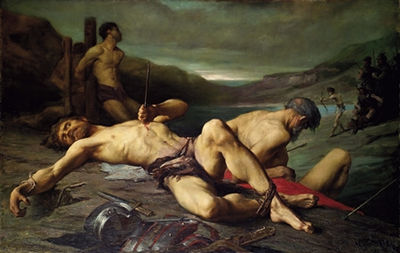
The Sons of Clovis, by Georges Moreau de Tours (1877)

=== Sainthood ===
Saint Clovis
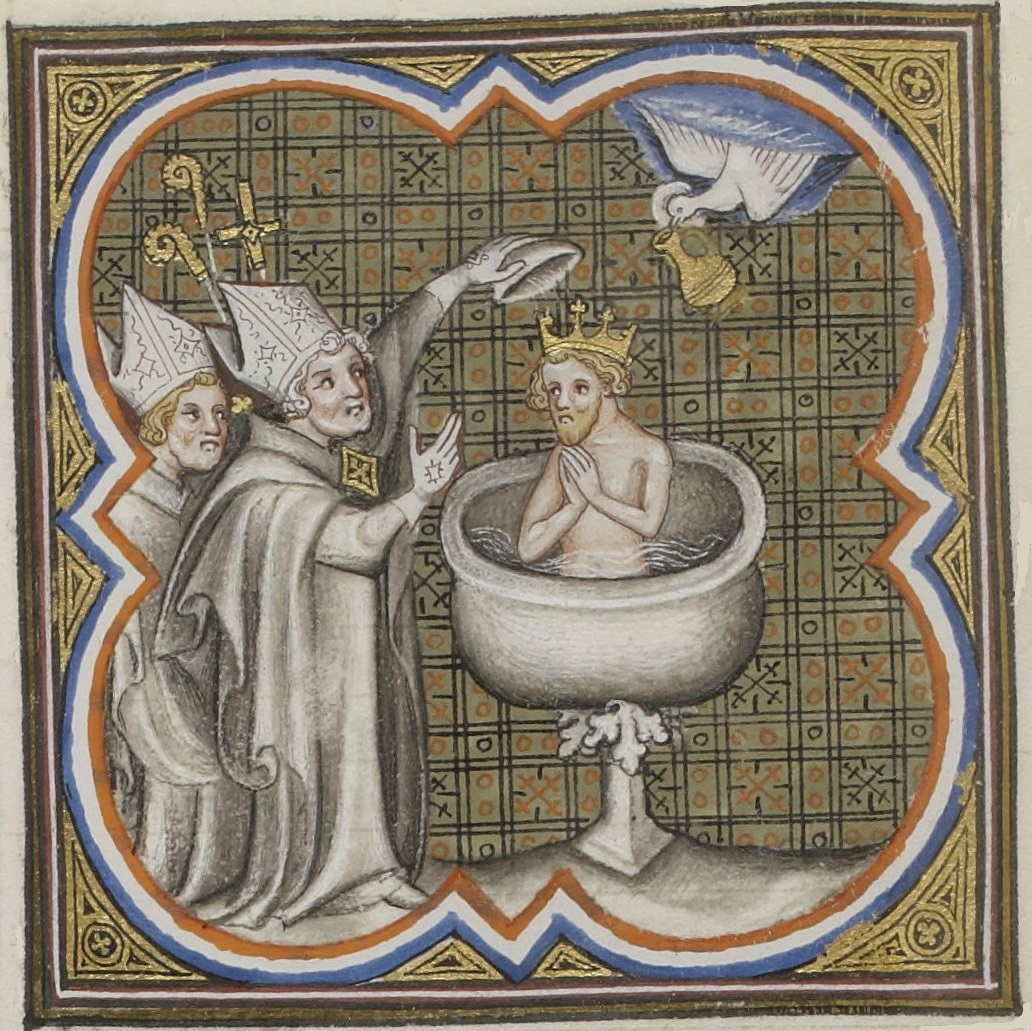

King and New Constantine
- Born: c. 466; Tournai
- Died: 27 November 511; Paris
- Venerated in: Catholic Church in France and Southern Italy
- Major shrine: Basilica of Saint-Denis; Abbey of Saint Genevieve; Moissac Abbey
- Feast: 27 November (France), 26 October (Southern Italy)
- Attributes: suit-of-armour; upright sword; fleur-de-lis; three frogs (his attributed arms)
- Patronage: France
- Controversy: Lack of papal approval; debated violent character; interference from the French state.

In later centuries, Clovis was venerated as a saint in France. The Benedictine Abbey of Saint-Denis (where Clovis was buried) had a shrine to St. Clovis to the east of the main altar. There was also a shrine to him in the Abbey of Saint Genevieve in Paris. This shrine had a statue and a number of epitaphs and was probably where the veneration of St. Clovis began. Despite Clovis's presence in Paris, his cultus was largely based in the south of France. Abbot Aymeric de Peyrat (d. 1406), the author of the History of the Moissac Abbey, claimed that his own monastery was founded by St. Clovis and there were many monasteries named in his honour. Aymeric not only referred to Clovis as a saint but also prayed for St. Clovis's intercession. There were also known to be shrines dedicated to Clovis in Église Sainte-Marthe de Tarascon and Saint-Pierre-du-Dorât. Boniface Symoneta, Jacques Almain and Paulus Aemilius Veronensis gave hagiographic accounts of Clovis's life and at the time it was common to include Clovis's life in collections of the lives of the saints.

It has been suggested that the reason that the French state promoted the veneration of Clovis in the south was to establish a border cult that would cause Occitans to venerate the northern-led French state by venerating its founder. Another reason could be that Clovis was a preferable foundation figure for the House of Valois as their predecessors were the Direct Capetians who looked back to Charlemagne whose veneration had been widely recognised. In contrast to the theory of St. Clovis's cult being a primarily northern-supported movement, Amy Goodrich Remensnyder suggests that St. Clovis was used by Occitans to reject the northern concept of the monarchy and to reinstate their autonomy as something granted by the saint.

St. Clovis had the role of a more militarised royal saint than the pious Louis IX of France. As a saint, Clovis was important as he represented the spiritual birth of the nation and provided a chivalrous and ascetic model for French political leaders to follow. The veneration of St. Clovis was not exclusive to France as a print by the Holy Roman woodcut designer Leonhard Beck made for the Habsburg monarchs depicts Clovis as St. Chlodoveus, St. Boniface's Abbey in Munich depicted St. Chlodoveus as a saint worthy of emulation because of his advocacy, and the Florentine Baroque painter Carlo Dolci painted a large depiction of St. Clovis for the Imperial Apartment in the Uffizi Gallery.

St. Clovis had no known episcopal or papal canonisation or beatification but enjoyed pre-congregation popular acclaim. Following the example of the monks of St. Geneviève, St. Clovis's feast day in France was held on 27 November. St. Clovis enjoyed a persistent campaign from French royal authorities that few non-French national or dynastic saints did. French monarchs, beginning in the 14th century at the latest, attempted to canonise Clovis through papal recognition a number of times. The most notable attempt, led by King Louis XI and modelled on the successful canonisation campaign of Louis IX, occurred during a conflict with the Burgundians. The cause for Clovis's canonisation was taken up once again in the 17th century, with Jesuit support, a vita and an account of posthumous miracles, in opposition to the controversial historical works of Calvinist pastor Jean de Serres who portrayed Clovis as a cruel and bloodthirsty king.

The Jesuit attempt to formally canonize Clovis came after a rediscovery of Clovis's cultus in the 16th century. During this period, the dual role St. Clovis could have for modern France was clarified as that of a deeply sinful man who attained sainthood by submitting himself to the will of God, as well as being the founder of the Gallican Church. He also attained an essentially mystic reputation. St. Clovis's role in calling for the First Council of Orléans was understood to be strongly Gallican as he called it without Papal authority and with the understanding that he and his bishops had the authority to call councils that were binding for the Frankish people. For Protestant Gallicans, St. Clovis represented the role of the monarchy in governing the Church and curbing its abuses and was contrasted positively against the Papacy of his time. Protestants were unlikely to mention any of the miracles attributed to St. Clovis, sometimes even writing lengthy rejections of their existence. Instead, they saw his sainthood as evident from his creation of a state more holy and Christian than that of Rome.

Catholic writers in the 16th century expanded upon the lists of St. Clovis's attributed miracles, but in the early 17th century they also began to minimize their use of the miraculous elements of his hagiography. Mid-to-late-17th-century Jesuit writers resisted this trend and allowed for no doubt as to the miraculous nature of St. Clovis life or his sainthood. Jesuit writers stressed the more extreme elements of his hagiography, and that of other saints associated with him, even claiming that St. Remigius lived for five hundred years. These hagiographies would still be quoted and widely believed as late as 1896, the fourteenth centenary of his baptism, as a speech from Cardinal Langénieux demonstrates. Another factor that led to a resurgence in St. Clovis's veneration was the Spanish Monarchy's use of the title Catholic Monarchs, a title French Monarchs hoped to usurp by attributing it to the much earlier figure of St. Clovis.

== Chronology ==
The sole source for the early Frankish period is Gregory of Tours, who wrote around the year 590. His chronology for the reign of Clovis is almost certainly fabricated, often contradicting itself and other sources. Gregory often divides Clovis's life in spans of 5 years: he became king at age 15, defeated Syagrius in the 5th year of his reign, defeated the Alamanni in his 15th year, defeated the Visigoths in his 25th year, and died at the age of 45, in the 5th year after his victory at Vouillé, having reigned 30 years. The exact date on which Clovis became "king of all Franks" is not known, but it happened sometime after the Battle of Vouillé, which is securely dated to 507. After this battle, Clovis made Paris his capital, converted to Catholicism, and orchestrated the murders of Frankish kings Sigobert and Ragnachar, uniting all Franks under his rule. Clovis's baptism, traditionally dated to December 496 on the account of Gregory, is now believed to have taken place in December 508 according to Clovis's correspondence with the then Bishop of Vienne, Avitus of Vienne, which also indicates that he leaned toward Arianism before converting to Catholicism rather than paganism. The election of Paris as capital must have also happened around 508. Given that the hostilities between Ragnachar and Clovis began after his conversion, it can be inferred that their confrontation took place shortly after, in 509.

Clovis I is traditionally said to have died on 27 November 511. The day is found in one medieval calendar and two missals now in the Library of the Abbey of Saint Genevieve (which was founded by Clovis). However, two obituaries in the abbeys of Saint Genevieve and Saint Denis date his death to 29 November and 3 January, respectively. The latter date may be a confusion with the feast of Genevieve, which also falls on 3 January. Gregory of Tours states that Clovis died on the fifth year after the Battle of Vouillé, which gives 511 using inclusive counting. However, he also states that he died on the 11th year of the episcopate of Licinius of Tours (AD 518) and on the 112th year after the death of Martin of Tours (AD 508). The Liber Pontificalis records that Clovis's crown was sent to Pope Hormisdas (r. 514–523), which could imply a later date. Clovis is last attested in an official document dated to 11 July 511, on the First Council of Orléans, and it is generally accepted that he died shortly after.

Clovis I Merovingian Dynasty Born: 466 Died: November 27 511
Regnal titles
Preceded by Childeric I	King of the Salian Franks; 481 – c. 509	Conquered Francia
Conquest of Francia	King of the Franks c. 509 – 27 November 511	Succeeded by Clotaire I as king of Soissons
Conquest of Francia	King of the Franks c. 509 – 27 November 511	Succeeded by Childebert I as king of Paris
Conquest of Francia	King of the Franks c. 509 – 27 November 511	Succeeded by Chlodomer as king of Orléans
Conquest of Francia	King of the Franks c. 509 – 27 November 511	Succeeded by Theuderic I as king of Reims
