= Sigobert the Lame =

Frankish king

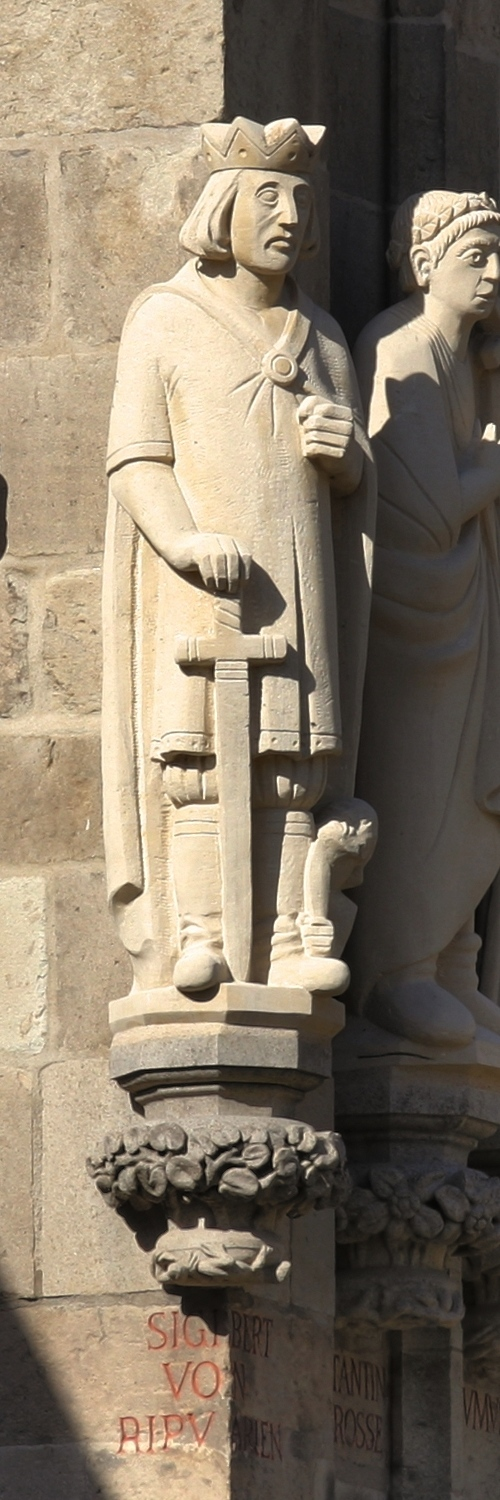
Statue of Sigobert the Lame on the tower of the city town hall of Cologne

Sigobert the Lame (also Sigibert or Sigebert) (died c. 508 or 509) was a king of the Ripuarian Franks in the area of Zülpich (Latin: Tolbiac) and Cologne.

== History ==
His father's name was "Childebert". He was presumably wounded in the knee at the Battle of Tolbiac against the Alamanni. He supported Clovis I again, against the Visigoths at the Battle of Vouillé in the spring of 507.

Despite his having lent assistance to Clovis on two previous occasions, according to Gregory of Tours, Sigobert was murdered by his son Chlodoric upon the instigation of Clovis I, when his son sent assassins upon him as he took a sojourn from his kingdom in a forest near Fulda. Chlodorich then told Clovis of the murder and offered him the finest treasures of his newly inherited kingdom as a symbol of their new alliance.

Clovis sent messengers to assess the treasure, who then asked Chlodoric to plunge his hand as deeply into his gold coins as possible. With his arm submerged, the envoys of Clovis then killed the new king in betrayal. Clovis then stood before the people of Chlodoric and professing horror at the murder of Sigebert, told them that the son had sent assassins to murder his father, but that Chlodoric had subsequently met his own end as well. Clovis then offered his protection to the former subjects of Sigobert and Chlodoric, and thus became their king.

Gregory suggests that Chlodoric was murdered in the same campaign that killed the Frankish King Chararic. Before, Clovis had killed Ragnachar and his brothers.

After all these murders, Gregory states that Clovis lamented that he had no family left, implying that among his own casualties were close relatives. He said this not out of grief or remorse, but so that any other relatives might identify themselves, and so be marked for death.

== Sources ==
- Gregory of Tours. The History of the Franks. 2 vol. trans. O. M. Dalton. Oxford: Clarendon Press, 1967.
