= Ragnachar =

Fifth-century Frankish ruler

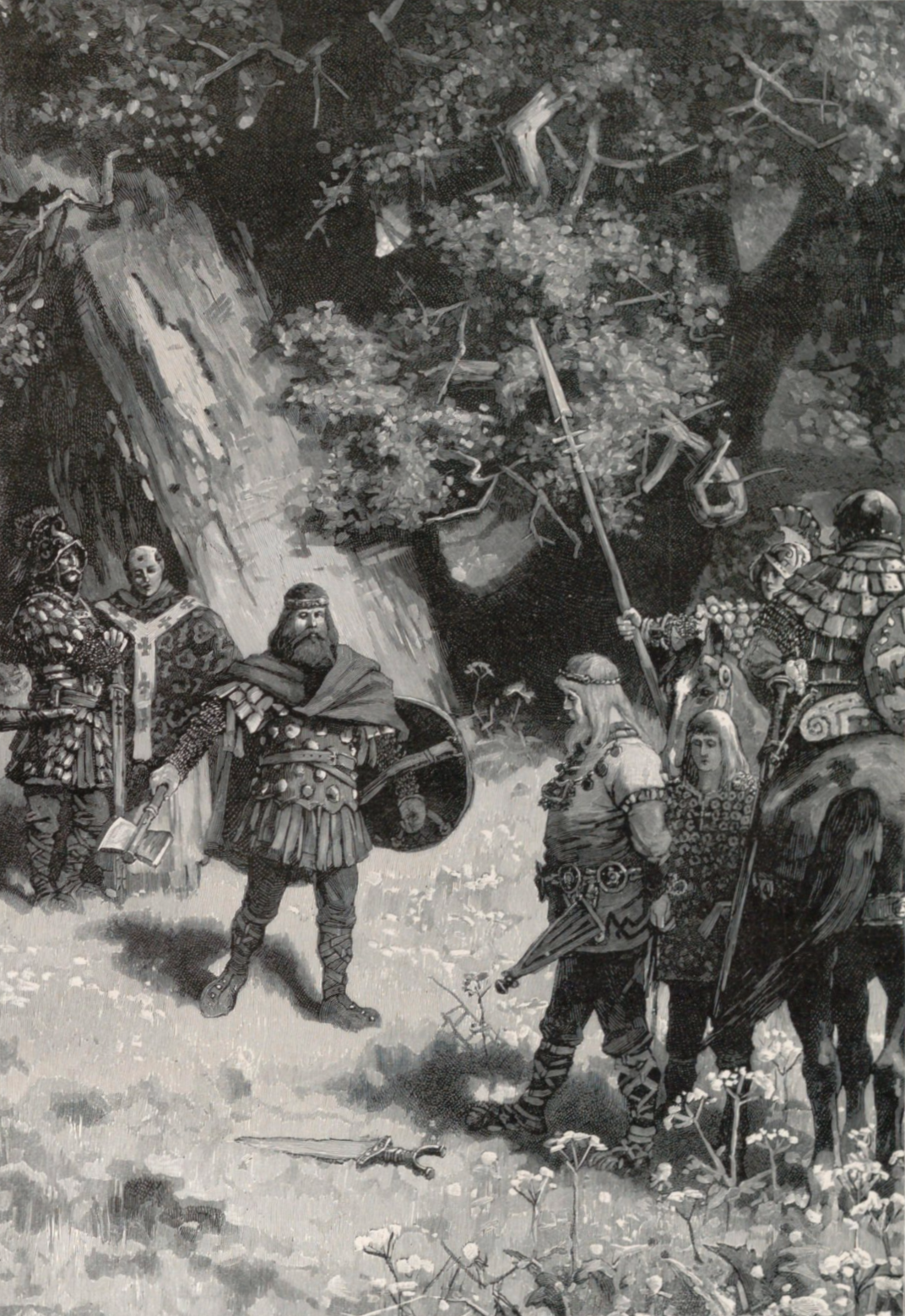
- Execution of Ragnachar by Clovis

King of Cambrai
- Reign: c. 460–509/510
- Successor: Clovis I as sole king
- Born: 5th century
- Died: c. 509/510 (aged 40/50)
- Issue: uncertain
- Dynasty: Merovingian
- Father: Sigemer (grandson of Chlodio) or Genniod (son of Merovech)

Ragnachar or Ragnarius (died 509) was a Frankish petty king (regulus) who ruled from Cambrai. According to Gregory of Tours, Ragnachar "was so unrestrained in his wantonness that he scarcely had mercy for his own near relatives".

According to the Gesta episcoporum Cameracensium, Clovis I and Ragnachar were related through Clovis's mother, Basina, a Thuringian princess.

In 486, Ragnachar allied with Clovis, who was king of the Franks, in order to attack Syagrius, the Roman ruler of the Domain of Soissons. After Clovis was baptised a Christian in 496, about half of the 6,000 or so Frankish warriors who formed the armies of the various reguli refused to join him and cleaved to Ragnachar, still a traditional pagan. Hincmar of Reims writes in his biography of Saint Remigius (who baptised Clovis): "Finally, many of the army of the Franks, not yet converted to the faith, followed the king's relative Ragnachar across the Somme for some distance."

The Gesta says that Ragnachar's unbridled lust extended even to the wives of his close associates. He also discounted the advice of his closet counselors in favor of his favorite courtier Farro. Ragnachar was reputed to divide all the gifts or food he received between himself and his favourite, and have a saying, "Enough for me and my Farro". Those thus offended plotted to be rid of Ragnachar.

The opportunity arose when, in 509, the arrogant Ragnachar denied Clovis entrance into Cambrai. Clovis took advantage of the disaffection and bribed Ragnachar's military followers, his leudes, with "armlets and belts [that were] made to resemble gold [but were only] bronze gilded so as to deceive", and thus deprived him of his support. Clovis then went to war against him.

When Ragnachar's spies came back from observing the movements of Clovis's army, they are reported to have said it was of "sufficient strength for you and your Farro". The leudes captured Ragnachar and his brother Ricchar (Riccar), while they were fleeing after their defeat in battle. They brought them, hands tied behind their backs, to Clovis. Gregory reports that Clovis asked Ragnachar: "Why have you humiliated our family in permitting yourself to be bound? It would have been better for you to die." He then killed him with an axe and told Ricchar, "If you had aided your brother, he would not have been bound", before killing Ricchar in the same way. Ragnachar's other brother, Rignomer, was later killed on Clovis's orders at Le Mans. At their death all of their family's riches and Ragnachar's kingdom passed to Clovis.

When the traitorous leudes complained of having received false gold, Clovis told them that that was their payment for betraying their lord, and that they should be grateful they still had their lives.

Hincmar's account of Ragnachar continues with his subsequent defeat, noting that the leudes followed him "until, the grace of Christ cooperating, the glorious victory obtained, that same Ragnachar, submitting to the shame of baseness, was bound by his own Franks to be handed over; King Clovis killed him and all the people of the Franks by the Blessed Remigius were converted to the faith and received baptism".

== Bibliography ==
- Bachrach, Bernard. Merovingian Military Organization, 481–751. Minneapolis: University of Minnesota Press, 1972.
- Bachrach, Bernard. "Procopius and the Chronology of Clovis's Reign," Viator, 1 (1970), 21–31.
- Dill, Samuel. Roman Society in Gaul in the Merovingian Age. London: Macmillan, 1926.
- Gregory of Tours. History of the Franks, trans. E. Brehaut, Records of Civilization 2. New York: Columbia University Press, 1916.
- Hincmar of Reims. "Vita Remigii episcopi Remensis", trans. B. Krusch, Monumenta Germaniae Historica, SS r. Merov. 3. Hanover, 1896.
- Kurth, Godefroi. Clovis, I. Paris, 1896.
- Wallace-Hadrill, J. M. The Long-Haired Kings and Other Studies in Frankish History. London: Butler & Tanner, 1962.
