= Romano-Germanic culture =

Roman culture

The term Romano-Germanic describes the conflation of Roman culture with that of various Germanic peoples in areas successively ruled by the Roman Empire and Germanic "barbarian monarchies".

These include the kingdoms of the Visigoths (in Hispania and Gallia Narbonensis), the Ostrogoths (in Italia, Sicilia, Raetia, Noricum, Pannonia, Dalmatia and Dacia), the Anglo-Saxon kingdoms in Sub-Roman Britain, and finally the Franks who established the nucleus of the later "Holy Roman Empire" in Gallia Aquitania, Gallia Lugdunensis, Gallia Belgica, Germania Superior and Inferior, and parts of the previously unconquered Germania Magna. Additionally, minor Germanic tribes – the Vandals, the Suebi, the Burgundians, the Alemanni, and later the Lombards − also established their kingdoms in Roman territory in the West.

Romano-Germanic cultural contact begins as early as the first Roman accounts of the Germanic peoples. Roman influence is perceptible beyond the boundaries of the empire, in the Northern European Roman Iron Age of the first centuries AD. The nature of this cultural contact changes with the decline of the Roman Empire and the beginning Migration period in the wake of the crisis of the third century: the "barbarian" peoples of Germania Magna formerly known as mercenaries and traders now came as invaders and eventually as a new ruling elite, even in Italy itself, beginning with Odoacer's rise to the rank of Dux Italiae in 476 AD.

The cultural syncretism was most pronounced in Francia. In West Francia, the nucleus of what was to become France, the Frankish language was eventually extinct, but not without leaving significant traces in the emerging Romance language. In East Francia on the other hand, the nucleus of what was to become the kingdom of Germany and ultimately German-speaking Europe, the syncretism was less pronounced since only its southernmost portion had ever been part of the Roman Empire, as Germania Superior: all territories on the right hand side of the Rhine remain Germanic-speaking. Those parts of the Germanic sphere extends along the left of the Rhine, including the Swiss Plateau, the Alsace, the Rhineland and Flanders, are the parts where Romano-Germanic cultural contact remains most evident.

Early Germanic law reflects the coexistence of Roman and Germanic cultures during the Migration period in applying separate laws to Roman and Germanic individuals, notably the Lex Romana Visigothorum (506), the Lex Romana Curiensis and the Lex Romana Burgundionum. The separate cultures amalgamated after Christianization, and by the Carolingian period the distinction of Roman vs. Germanic subjects had been replaced by the feudal system of the Three Estates of the Realm.

== See also ==
- Anglo-Norman
- Germania
- Holy Roman Empire
- Romano-Germanic Museum
