= Salic law =

Frankish civil law code

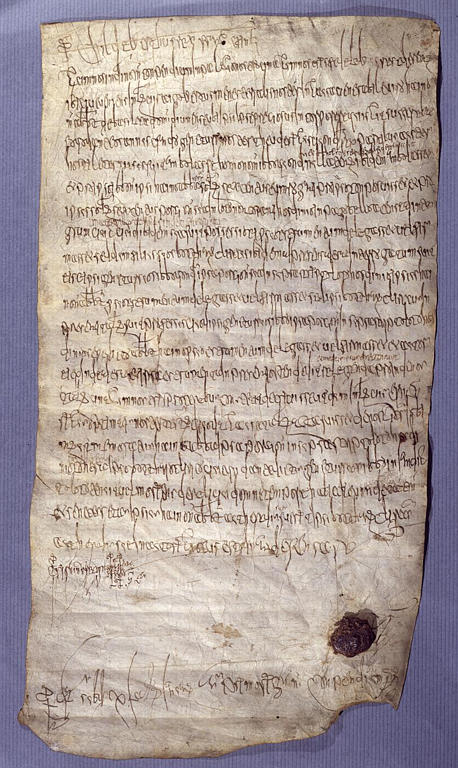
- Record of a judgement by Childebert III, who reigned from 694 to 711 AD
- Created: c. 500 AD
- Commissioned by: King Clovis
- Subject: Law, justice
- Purpose: Civil law code

Full text
- The Salic Law at Wikisource

The Salic law (/ˈsælɪk/ or /ˈseɪlɪk/; Latin: Lex salica), also called the Salian law, was a Frankish civil law code compiled around 500 AD by Clovis, the first Frankish king. The name may refer to the Salii, or "Salian Franks", but this is debated. The written text is in Late Latin, and contains some of the earliest known instances of Old Dutch. It remained the basis of Frankish law throughout the early medieval period, and influenced future European legal systems. The best-known tenet of the old law is the principle of exclusion of women from inheritance of thrones, fiefs, and other property. The Salic laws were arbitrated by a committee appointed by the Frankish king. Dozens of manuscripts dating from the 6th to 8th centuries and three emendations as late as the 9th century have survived.

Salic law provided written codification of both civil law, such as the statutes governing inheritance, and criminal law, such as the punishment for murder. Although it was originally intended as the law of the Franks, it has had a formative influence on the tradition of statute law that extended to modern history in much of Europe, especially in the German states and Austria-Hungary in Central Europe, the Low Countries in Western Europe, the Balkan kingdoms in Southeastern Europe, and parts of Italy and Spain in Southern Europe. Its use of agnatic succession governed the succession of kings in kingdoms such as France and Italy.

== History of the law ==
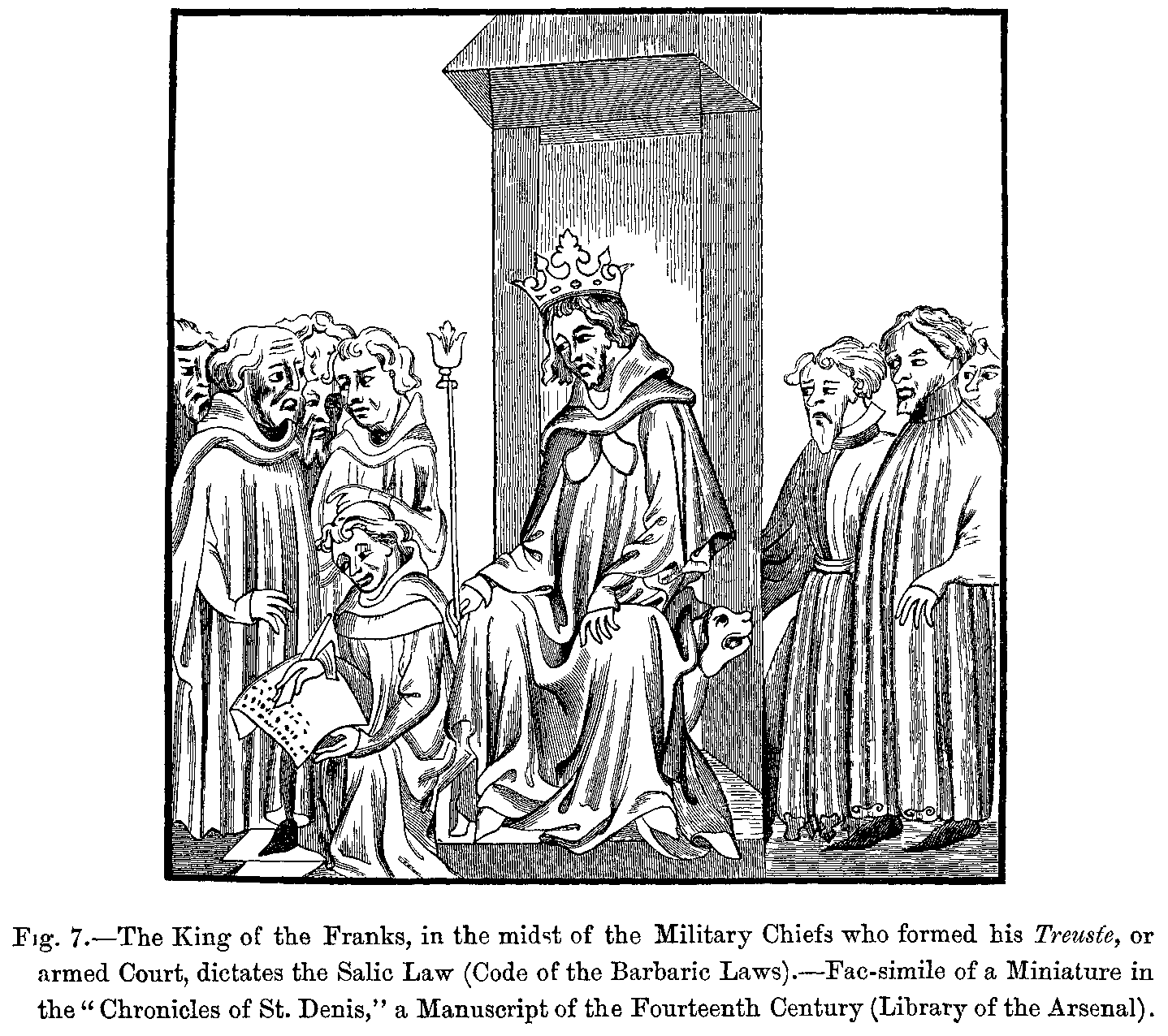
King Clovis dictates the Lex Salica surrounded by his military chiefs.

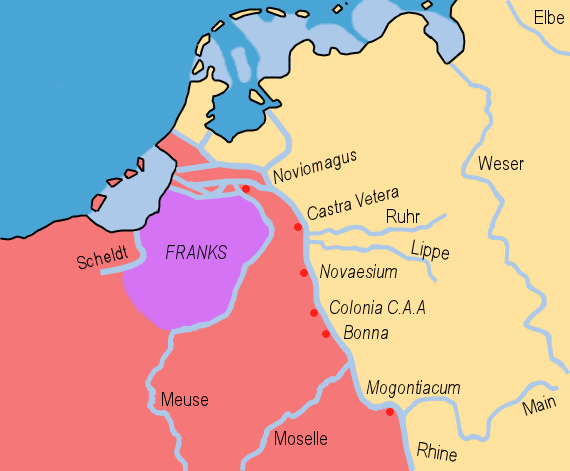
Salian settlement in Toxandria, where they had recently settled or been settled in 358, when Julian the Apostate made them dediticii

The original edition of the code was commissioned by the first king of all the Franks, Clovis I (c. 466–511), and published sometime between 507 and 511. He appointed four commissioners to research customary law that, until the publication of the Salic law, had been recorded only in the minds of designated elders, who would meet in council when their knowledge was required. Transmission was entirely oral. Salic law, therefore, reflects ancient usages and practices. A written code was desirable for monarchs and their administrations, allowing them to govern more effectively.

For the next 300 years, the code was copied by hand, and was amended as required to add newly enacted laws, revise laws that had been amended, and delete laws that had been repealed. In contrast with printing, hand copying is an individual act by an individual copyist with ideas and a style of his own. Each of the several dozen surviving manuscripts features a unique set of errors, corrections, content, and organization. The laws are called "titles", as each one has its own name, generally preceded by de, "of", "concerning". Different sections of titles acquired individual names, which revealed something about their provenances. Some of these dozens of names have been adopted for specific reference, often given the same designation as the overall work, lex.

=== Merovingian phase ===
The recension of Hendrik Kern organizes all of the manuscripts into five families according to similarity and relative chronological sequence, judged by content and dateable material in the text. Family I is the oldest, containing four manuscripts dated to the eighth and ninth centuries, but containing 65 titles believed to be copies of originals published in the sixth century. In addition, they feature the Malbergse Glossen, "Malberg Glosses", marginal glosses stating the native court word for some Latin words. These are named from native malbergo, "language of the court". Kern's Family II, represented by two manuscripts, is the same as Family I, except that it contains "interpolations or numerous additions, which point to a later period".

=== Carolingian phase ===
Family III is split into two divisions. The first, comprising three manuscripts, dated to the eighth–ninth centuries, presents an expanded text of 99 or 100 titles. The Malberg Glosses are retained. The second division, with four manuscripts, not only drops the glosses, but also "bears traces of attempts to make the language more concise". A statement gives the provenance: "in the 13th year of the reign of our most glorious king of the Franks, Pipin". Some of the internal documents were composed after the reign of Pepin the Short, but it is considered to be an emendation initiated by Pepin, so is termed the Pipina Recensio.

Family IV also has two divisions – the first comprised 33 manuscripts; the second, one manuscript. They are characterized by the internal assignment of Latin names to various sections of different provenances. Two of the sections are dated to 768 and 778, but the emendation is believed to be dated to 798, late in the reign of Charlemagne. This edition calls itself the Lex Salica Emendata, or the Lex Reformata, or the Lex Emendata, and is clearly the result of a law code reform by Charlemagne.

By that time, Charlemagne's Holy Roman Empire comprised most of Western Europe. He added laws of choice (free will) taken from the earlier law codes of Germanic peoples not originally part of Francia. These are numbered into the laws that were there, but they have their own, quasisectional title. All the Franks of Francia were subject to the same law code, which retained the overall title of Lex Salica. These integrated sections borrowed from other Germanic codes are the Lex Ribuariorum, later Lex Ribuaria, laws adopted from the Ripuarian Franks, who, before Clovis, had been independent. The Lex Alamannorum took laws from the Alamanni, then subject to the Franks. Under the Franks, they were governed by Frankish law, not their own. The inclusion of some of their law as part of the Salic law may have served as a palliative. Charlemagne goes back even earlier to the Lex Suauorum, the ancient code of the Suebi preceding the Alemanni.

== Malberg glosses ==
The Salic law code contains the Malberg glosses, Germanic terms interspersed through the Latin legal docoment. These Germanic words and several short sentences are, though heavily corrupted by subsequent copyists unfamiliar with the original language, have been used to reconstruct the earliest stage of the Dutch language, Old Dutch, containing what is likely the earliest surviving full sentence in the language:

Malberg gloss	maltho	thi*	afrio	lito**
(Modern) Dutch	ik meld,	jou	bevrijd ik,	laat
English	I tell you:	I am setting you free,		serve

* Old Dutch and Early Modern and earlier versions of English used the second-person singular pronouns, such as thou and thee.
** A lito was a form of serf in the feudal system, a half-free farmer, connected to the lord's land, but not owned by that lord. In contrast, a slave was fully owned by the lord.

This sentence is also given as the following:

Malberg gloss	maltho:	thi	afrio,	letu!
translation	I declare judicially:	I let you free,		half-free (farmer)!

== Some tenets of the law ==
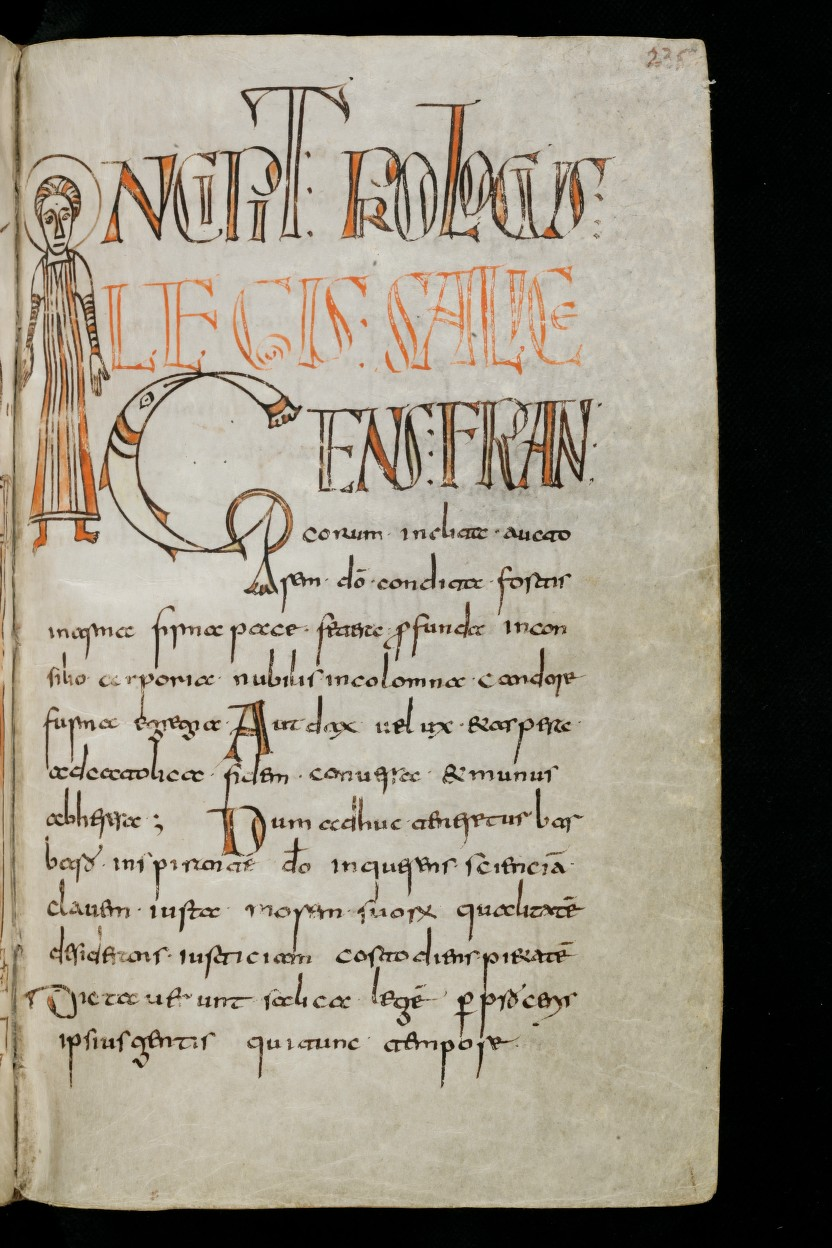
Start of the Salic law in the Wandalgarius Codex of 793/4

These laws and their interpretations give an insight into Frankish society. The criminal laws established damages to be paid and fines levied in recompense for injuries to persons and damage to goods, theft, and unprovoked insults. One-third of the fine paid court costs. Judicial interpretation was by a jury of peers.

The civil law establishes that an individual person is legally unprotected if he or she does not belong to a family. The rights of family members were defined; for example, the equal division of land among all living male heirs, in contrast to primogeniture.

=== Agnatic succession ===
One tenet of the civil law is agnatic succession, explicitly excluding females from the inheritance of a throne or fief. Indeed, "Salic law" has often been used simply as a synonym for agnatic succession, but the importance of Salic law extends beyond the rules of inheritance, as it is a direct ancestor of the systems of law in use in many parts of continental Europe today.

Salic law regulates succession according to sex. "Agnatic succession" means succession to the throne or fief going to an agnate of the predecessor – for example, a brother, a son, or nearest male relative through the male line, including collateral agnate branches, for example very distant cousins. Chief forms are agnatic seniority and agnatic primogeniture. The latter, which has been the most usual, means succession going to the eldest son of the monarch; if the monarch had no sons, the throne would pass to the nearest male relative in the male line.

=== Female inheritance ===
Concerning the inheritance of land, Salic law said:

But of Salic land no portion of the inheritance shall come to a woman: but the whole inheritance of the land shall come to the male sex.

or, another transcript:

[C]oncerning terra Salica, no portion or inheritance is for a woman, but all the land belongs to members of the male sex who are brothers.

The law merely prohibited women from inheriting ancestral "Salic land"; this prohibition did not apply to other property (such as personal property); and under Chilperic I sometime around the year 570, the law was actually amended to permit inheritance of land by a daughter if a man had no surviving sons (This amendment, depending on how it is applied and interpreted, offers the basis for either Semi-Salic succession or male-preferred primogeniture, or both).

The wording of the law, as well as common usage in those days and centuries afterwards, seems to support an interpretation that inheritance is divided between brothers, and if it is intended to govern succession, it can be interpreted to mandate agnatic seniority, not direct primogeniture. In its use by continental hereditary monarchies since the 15th century, aiming at agnatic succession, the Salic law is regarded as excluding all females from the succession, and prohibiting the transfer of succession rights through any woman. At least two systems of hereditary succession are direct and full applications of the Salic Law: agnatic seniority and agnatic primogeniture.

The Semi-Salic version of succession order stipulates that firstly all-male descendance is applied, including all collateral male lines, but if all such lines are extinct, then the closest female agnate (such as a daughter) of the last male holder of the property inherits, and after her, her own male heirs according to the Salic order. In other words, the female closest to the last incumbent is "regarded as a male" for the purposes of inheritance and succession. This has the effect of following the closest extant blood line (at least in the first instance) and not involving any more distant relatives. The closest female relative might be a child of a relatively junior branch of the whole dynasty, but still inherits due to her position in the male line, due to the longevity of her own branch; any existing senior female lines come behind that of the closest female.

From the Middle Ages, another system of succession, known as cognatic male primogeniture, actually fulfills apparent stipulations of the original Salic law; succession is allowed also through female lines, but excludes the females themselves in favour of their sons. For example, a grandfather, without sons, is succeeded by a son of his daughter, when the daughter in question is still alive. Or an uncle, with no children of his own, is succeeded by a son of his sister, when the sister in question is still alive. This fulfils the Salic condition of "no land comes to a woman, but the land comes to the male sex". This can be called a "quasi-Salic" system of succession and it should be classified as primogenitural, cognatic, and male-preferred.

=== Migration law ===
A title in the Salic law code required the unanimous consent of a village for any newcomer wishing to move and settle there, with the disapproval of just a single resident being sufficient to deny settlement rights. A migrant's tenure in a settlement would only become secure if no objections were received within 12 months of arrival.

== Applications of the succession and inheritance laws ==
=== In France ===
The Merovingian kings divided their realm equally among all living sons, leading to much conflict and fratricide among the rival heirs. The Carolingians did likewise, but they also possessed the imperial dignity, which was indivisible and passed to only one person at a time. Primogeniture, or the preference for the eldest line in the transmission of inheritance, eventually emerged in France, under the Capetian kings. The early Capetians had only one heir, the eldest son, whom they crowned during their lifetimes. Instead of an equal portion of the inheritance, the younger sons of the Capetian kings received an appanage, which is a feudal territory under the suzerainty of the king. Feudal law allowed the transmission of fiefs to daughters in default of sons, which was also the case for the early appanages. Whether feudal law also applied to the French throne, no one knew, until 1316.

==== The succession in 1316 ====
For a remarkably long period, from the inception of the Capetian dynasty in 987 until the death of Louis X in 1316, the eldest living son of the King of France succeeded to the throne upon his demise. No prior occasion existed to demonstrate whether or not females were excluded from the succession to the crown. Louis X died without a son, but left his wife pregnant. The king's brother, Philip, Count of Poitiers, became regent. Philip prepared for the contingencies with Odo IV, Duke of Burgundy, maternal uncle of Louis X's daughter and prospective heiress, Joan. If the unborn child were male, he would succeed to the French throne as king; if female, Philip would maintain the regency until the daughters of Louis X reached their majority. The opportunity remained for either daughter to succeed to the French throne.

The unborn child proved to be male, John I, to the relief of the kingdom, but the infant lived for only a few days. Philip saw his chance and broke the agreement with the Duke of Burgundy by having himself anointed at Reims in January 1317 as Philip V of France. Agnes of France, daughter of Louis IX, mother of the Duke of Burgundy, and maternal grandmother of the Princess Joan, considered it a usurpation and demanded an assembly of the peers, which Philip V accepted.

An assembly of prelates, lords, the bourgeois of Paris, and doctors of the university, known as the Estates-General of 1317, gathered in February. Philip V asked them to write an argument justifying his right to the throne of France. These "general statements" agreed in declaring that "Women do not succeed in the kingdom of France", formalizing Philip's usurpation and the impossibility for a woman to ascend the throne of France, a principle that remains in force to this day. The Salic law, at the time, was not yet invoked; the arguments put forward in favor of Philip V relied only on the degree of proximity of Philip V with Louis X. Philip had the support of the nobility and had the resources for his ambitions.

Philip won over the Duke of Burgundy by giving him his daughter, also named Joan, in marriage, with the counties of Artois and Burgundy as her eventual inheritance. On March 27, 1317, a treaty was signed at Laon between the Duke of Burgundy and Philip V, wherein Joan renounced her right to the throne of France.

==== The succession in 1328 ====
Philip, too, died without a son, and his brother Charles succeeded him as Charles IV unopposed. Charles, too, died without a son, but also left his wife pregnant. It was another succession crisis, the same as that in 1316; it was necessary both to prepare for a possible regency (and choose a regent) and prepare for a possible succession to the throne. At this point, it had been accepted that women could not claim the crown of France (without any written rule stipulating it yet).

Under the application of the agnatic principle, the following were excluded:

- The daughters of Louis X, Philip V and Charles IV, including the possible unborn daughter of the pregnant Queen Jeanne d'Évreux
- Isabella of France, sister of Louis X, Philip V, and Charles IV, wife of King Edward II of England

The widow of Charles IV gave birth to a daughter. Isabella of France, sister of Charles IV, claimed the throne for her son, Edward III of England. The French rejected the claim, noting that "Women cannot transmit a right which they do not possess", a corollary to the succession principle in 1316. The regent, Philip of Valois, became Philip VI of France in 1328. Philip became king without serious opposition, until his attempt to confiscate Gascony in 1337 made Edward III press his claim to the French throne.

==== Emergence of the Salic law ====
As far as can be ascertained, Salic law was not explicitly mentioned either in 1316 or 1328. It had been forgotten in the feudal era, and the assertion that the French crown can only be transmitted to and through males made it unique and exalted in the eyes of the French. In 1358 the monk Richard Lescot invoked it to dispute the claim of Charles II of Navarre to the French crown, an argument that would later be echoed by other jurists in defence of the Valois dynasty.

In its origin, therefore, the agnatic principle was limited to the succession to the crown of France. Prior to the Valois succession, Capetian kings granted appanages to their younger sons and brothers, which could pass to male and female heirs. The appanages given to the Valois princes, though, in imitation of the succession law of the monarchy that gave them, limited their transmission to males. Another Capetian lineage, the Montfort of Brittany, claimed male succession in the Duchy of Brittany. In this they were supported by the King of England, while their rivals who claimed the traditional female succession in Brittany were supported by the King of France. The Montforts eventually won the duchy by warfare, but had to recognize the suzerainty of the King of France.

This law was by no means intended to cover all matters of inheritance – for example, not the inheritance of movables — only to lands considered "Salic" – and debate remains as to the legal definition of this word, although it is generally accepted to refer to lands in the royal fisc. Only several hundred years later, under the direct Capetian kings of France and their English contemporaries who held lands in France, did Salic law become a rationale for enforcing or debating succession.

Shakespeare says that Charles VI rejected Henry V's claim to the French throne on the basis of Salic law's inheritance rules, leading to the Battle of Agincourt. In fact, the conflict between Salic and English law was a justification for many overlapping claims between the French and English monarchs over the French throne.

More than a century later, during the French wars of religion, Philip II of Spain attempted to claim the French crown for his daughter Isabella Clara Eugenia, born of his third wife, Elisabeth of Valois in order to prevent the Huguenot candidate Henry of Navarre from becoming king. Philip's agents were instructed to "insinuate cleverly" that the Salic law was a "pure invention". Even if the "Salic law" did not really apply to the throne of France, though, the very principle of agnatic succession had become a cornerstone of the French royal succession; they had upheld it in the Hundred Years' War with the English, and it had produced their kings for more than two centuries. The eventual recognition of Henry of Navarre as King Henry IV of France following his conversion to Catholicism, the first of the Bourbon kings, further solidified the agnatic principle in France.

Although no reference was made to the Salic law, the imperial constitutions of the Bonapartist First French Empire and Second French Empire continued to exclude women from the succession to the throne. In the lands that Napoleon Bonaparte conquered, Salic law was adopted, including the Kingdom of Westphalia, the Kingdom of Holland, and under Napoleonic influence, Sweden under the House of Bernadotte.

=== Other European applications ===
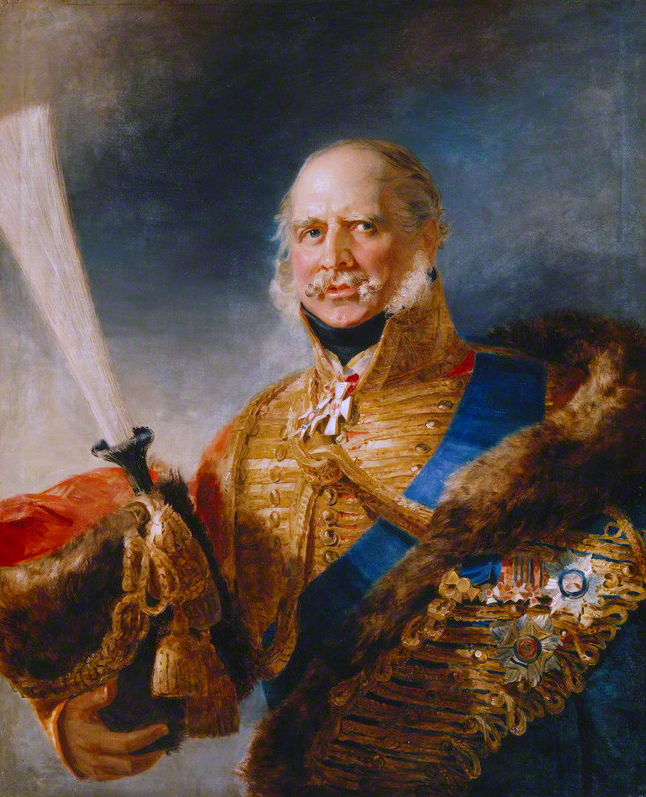
Portrait of the Duke of Cumberland George Dawe. In 1837 Cumberland became King of Hanover ahead of his niece Queen Victoria.

Several military conflicts in European history have stemmed from the application of, or disregard for, Salic law. The Carlist Wars occurred in Spain over the question of whether the heir to the throne should be a female or a male relative. The War of the Austrian Succession was triggered by the Pragmatic Sanction of 1713, in which Charles VI of Austria, who himself had inherited the Austrian patrimony over his nieces as a result of Salic law, attempted to ensure the inheritance directly to his own daughter Maria Theresa of Austria, which was an example of an operation of quasi-Salic law.

In the modern Kingdom of Italy, under the House of Savoy, succession to the throne was regulated by Salic law.

The British and the Hanoverian thrones separated after the death of King William IV of the United Kingdom and of Hanover in 1837 because Hanover practiced quasi-Salic law, unlike Britain. King William's niece, Victoria, ascended to the British throne, but the Hanover throne went to William's brother Ernest, Duke of Cumberland.

Salic law was also an important issue in the Schleswig-Holstein Question and played a day-to-day role in the inheritance and marriage decisions of common princedoms of the German states, such as Saxe-Weimar, to cite a representative example. European nobility would have confronted Salic issues at every turn in the practice of diplomacy, particularly when they negotiated marriages, since the entire male line had to be extinguished for a land title to pass (by marriage) "to a female's husband". Women rulers were anathema in the German states well into the modern era.

In a similar way, the thrones of the Kingdom of the Netherlands and the Grand Duchy of Luxembourg were separated in 1890, with the succession of Princess Wilhelmina as the first Queen regnant of the Netherlands. As a remnant of Salic law, the office of the reigning monarch of the Netherlands is always formally known as "King", though her title may be "Queen". Luxembourg passed to the House of Orange-Nassau's distantly related agnates, the House of Nassau-Weilburg, but that house also faced extinction in the male line less than two decades later. With no other male-line agnates in the remaining branches of the House of Nassau, Grand Duke William IV adopted a quasi-Salic law of succession to allow him to be succeeded by his daughters.

== Literary references ==
Shakespeare uses the Salic law as a plot device in Henry V, saying it was upheld by the French to bar Henry V's claiming the French throne. Henry V begins with the Archbishop of Canterbury being asked if the claim might be upheld despite the Salic law. The archbishop replies, "That the land Salique is in Germany, between the floods of Sala and of Elbe", implying that the law is German, not French. The archbishop's justification for Henry's claim, which Shakespeare intentionally renders obtuse and verbose (for comedic, as well as politically expedient reasons) is also erroneous, as the Salian Franks settled along the lower Rhine and Scheldt, which today is for the most part in the Flemish Region.

The concept of Salic law figures heavily into the story of French author Maurice Druon's historical fiction novel series, The Accursed Kings (known as Les Rois maudits in French, published between 1955 and 1977). The series, which revolves around the Capetian succession crisis in the early-to-mid 14th century after Philip IV's sons all three die without a male heir, contains seven books which were published between the 1950s-1970s. In the fourth book (The Royal Succession), Philip V uses his position as regent while his sister-in-law is pregnant to get his lawyers to come up with a plan to use Salic law to get his niece Joan out of the line of succession. He becomes king after his nephew John I (who'd been swapped with another baby) is ostensibly poisoned by Philip's mother-in-law Mahaut, Countess of Artois. John I of France during his christening. In reality, it is widely believed that John died of natural causes and Giannino Baglioni, the man who claimed to be him, was a Pretender. During the fifth and sixth books, Queen Isabella begins to press her son Edward III's claim to the French throne as the last-living grandson of Philip IV. However, the French nobility are more inclined to bypass her claim under Salic Law in lieu of that of her cousin, Philip VI, the next male-line descendant. The relationship between the two men begins to sour once Edward III reaches his majority and begins to rule on his own, eventually ending with Robert of Artois (who's also fallen out with Philip) convincing him to stake his claim once and for all at the end of the sixth book. The seventh book, A King Without a Kingdom, skips ahead significantly in time to the lead-up to the devastating defeat of the French at The Battle of Poitiers, which ends with the capture of Philip VI's son John II at the hand of Edward III's son Edward the Black Prince.

In the 1970 novel Royal Flash, by George MacDonald Fraser, the hero, Harry Flashman, on his marriage, is presented with the royal consort's portion of the crown jewels, and "The Duchess did rather better"; the character, feeling hard done-by, thinks, "It struck me then, and it strikes me now, that the Salic law was a damned sound idea".

In his 1814 novel Waverley, Sir Walter Scott quotes "Salique Law" when discussing the protagonist's prior requests for a horse and guide to take him to Edinburgh.

The hostess, a civil, quiet, laborious drudge, came to take his orders for dinner, but declined to make answer on the subject of the horse and guide; for the Salique Law, it seems, extended to the stables of the Golden Candlestick.

— Chapter XX1X

== See also ==
- Agnatic descent
- Early Germanic law
- Paris, BN, lat. 4404
