= Ratold of Italy =

King of Italy in 896

Ratold was a king of Italy who reigned for a month or so in 896. He was an illegitimate son of King Arnulf of East Francia. He and his half-brother Zwentibold are described by the Annals of Fulda as being born "by concubines" (ex concubinis). Their mothers are not named, and it is possible that their status was only downgraded to that of concubinage after Arnulf's marriage to Uota in 888. They may have originally been in Friedelehen, "consent-based marriages", a kind of common-law marriage.

His birth date is unknown; he may have been a "mature man" by the time he was appointed to rule Italy. In 889, Arnulf persuaded the East Frankish nobility to recognise Zwentibold and Ratold as his heirs if no legitimate son was born to the queen. One historian suggests that it was Arnulf's plan all along to secure sub-kingdoms for his illegitimate sons (Lotharingia for Zwentibold and Italy for Ratold) while reserving East Francia itself for his legitimate issue. After Arnulf was crowned emperor in Rome in 896, he fell ill and quickly returned to Germany by May, leaving, in the words of the Annals of Fulda, "his little son called Ratold, who had been born to him by a concubine, at Milan to receive the fidelity of the Italian people." (Note: parvulo filio suo nomine Ratolfo, qui ei de concubina erat, ad fidem Italicae gentis Mediolanium dimisso.) The somewhat elliptical passage leaves open whether Ratold was merely his father's "deputy" or a full-fledged "sub-king" in Italy. Soon after Arnulf left, his rival, Duke Lambert II of Spoleto, took control of Italy and nothing more is heard of Ratold. Arnulf's legitimate son, Louis the Child, was recognised as his heir by the nobility in 897.
