= Anianus (referendary) =

Anianus was a Gallo-Roman nobleman who served as the referendary of Alaric II, king of the Visigoths. He was a vir spectabilis, that is, an "admirable man", or holder of high office in the empire.

Anianus was tasked by Alaric to authenticate with his signature the official copies of the Breviary of Alaric, which had been distilled by other legal writers from the Codex Theodosianus. In his signature he used the Latin words Anianus, vir spectabilis subscripsi et edidi, and it is probable that, from a misunderstanding of the word edidi, proceeded the common notion that he was the author or editor of the work, which has sometimes been called Breviarium Aniani. He was not, and only functioned in the capacity of referendary, to authenticate the books themselves.

Anianus' authentication of the copies of this work took place at Aire (modern Aire-sur-l'Adour) 506 AD.

The medieval writer Sigebert of Gembloux says that this Anianus translated from Greek into Latin the work of John Chrysostom on Matthew the Apostle, but it's now considered likely he was mistaken and instead meant Anianus of Celeda.
