= Carolingian monetary system =

Currency structure (Charlemagne, 8th C)

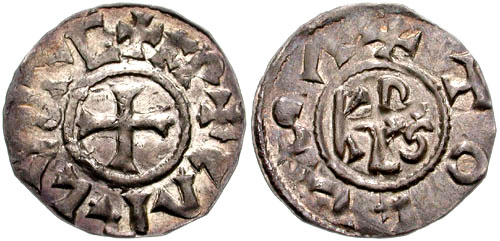
Carolingian denarius (Denier)

The Carolingian monetary system, also called the Carolingian coinage system or just the Carolingian system, was a currency structure introduced by Charlemagne in the late 8th century as part of a major reform, the effects of which subsequently dominated much of Europe, including Great Britain, for centuries. It is characterised by having three denominations with values in the ratio 1:20:240, the units of which went under different names in the different languages, but which corresponded to the Latin terms libra (pound), solidus (shilling) and denarius (penny), respectively.

The currency reform carried out by Emperor Charlemagne around 793/794 was of crucial importance to the medieval monetary systems in what became the Frankish Roman Empire and more generally affected European coinage for many centuries. Because gold could almost only be obtained through long-distance trade, while conversely there were quite a few silver deposits in Europe north of the Alps, Charlemagne introduced a pure silver currency. The basic weight of the coin became a pfund ("pound"), from which 240 pfennigs ("pennies") could be struck. This Carolingian pound weighed approximately 408 grams.

The pfennig and its corresponding entity in other countries was the most important coin of the Middle Ages. The pfund or pound was already a unit of weight and within this system also became a currency unit. The schilling, like the pfund, was not minted for a long time, but used only as a unit of account worth 12 pfennigs.

== History and distribution ==
=== Antiquity ===
The coinage system of the classical Roman Empire was originally based on the copper coin, the as (later made of bronze) and multiples of this such as denarius = 10 as, quinarius = 5 as, sestertius = 2½ as etc. The silver coin, the denarius, was thus quite common for a period, but Roman accounting was based on the sestertius. During the last centuries of the Empire, numerous changes were made to the coinage system (e.g., by Augustus in 24 AD, Caracalla in 215, Aurelian in 274, Diocletian in 293, Constantine the Great in 312, etc.). Emperor Diocletian introduced the gold coin, the solidus, with its system of 1 solidus = 10 argentii = 40 nummii = 200 radiates = 500 laureates = 1,000 denarii. Emperor Constantine introduced a modified solidus with a value equal to 72 solidi or one pound (libra) of pure gold, and a new accounting for it as 1 solidus = 2 scripula = 3 1/3 tremisses = 4 semisses = 18 miliarenses = 24 siliquae. Numerous other introductions of new coins and changes in their value meant that in the last days of the empire and the following centuries (the Migration Period) there was a confusion of different coins and associated weight and measure systems in circulation.

=== Charlemagne's reforms ===
Drawing of a man holding Charlemagne's new denarius, from the Wandalgarius Codex, October 793

Charlemagne's father, Pippin the Younger, began the overhaul of these systems by closing the mints of the great magnates and prelates of the Empire and establishing minting rights as an exclusively royal privilege. However, there were still 22 schillings to the imperial pound, the extra 2 schillings going to the mintmaster and the Imperial Treasury, leaving 20 to be issued into circulation.

This subsequently gave Charlemagne the power to put an end to the currency confusion by introducing a new standardised system that was the most wide-ranging and long-lasting of all the reforms, but was part of a much broader standardisation intended to make the Empire more governable. He defined the Carolingian pound (libra) as a new unit of weight, significantly larger than the old Roman pound of 328.9 g. He introduced a new silver coin called the denarius, of which 240 made up 1 pound of pure silver. A denar or denier thus contained 1.7 g of silver. To facilitate the handling of monetary calculations, he also introduced a unit of account, the solidus, so that 1 solidus = 12 denarii. Thus began the characteristic tripartite accountancy system (L 1 = 20s = 240d).

==== First period ====
From AD 771, the new coinage system was introduced throughout the Frankish Realm and the future Carolingan Empire, which would extent across modern France, the Benelux, and most of Germany and Italy. The majority of denar coins of this period had a standard design with, on one side, the name of the King of the Franks on two lines thus: C A R o / L U S. On the other side gave the location of the mint, for example, for Liège: L E o / D I C o.

==== Second period ====
In around 793 or 794, the Carolingian pound, or Karlspfund (Latin: ponus Caroli), was introduced as the basis of the system of weights and coinage in the Realm. At some point Charlemagne scrapped the old 22 schilling system and the Treasury and mintmasters were now paid from taxes. Thus 1 Pfund generated 20 schillings, each worth 12 denarii. In 794 a decree was issued that the novi denarii were to be used and accepted throughout the Frankish Realm; they would be of pure silver and display Charlemagne's name on them. So on one side was the inscription CARLVS REX FR ("Charles, King of the Franks") and, on the other, as before, the place where the mint was located, e.g. DORESTADO ("Dorestad"). There were around sixty mints.

==== Third period ====
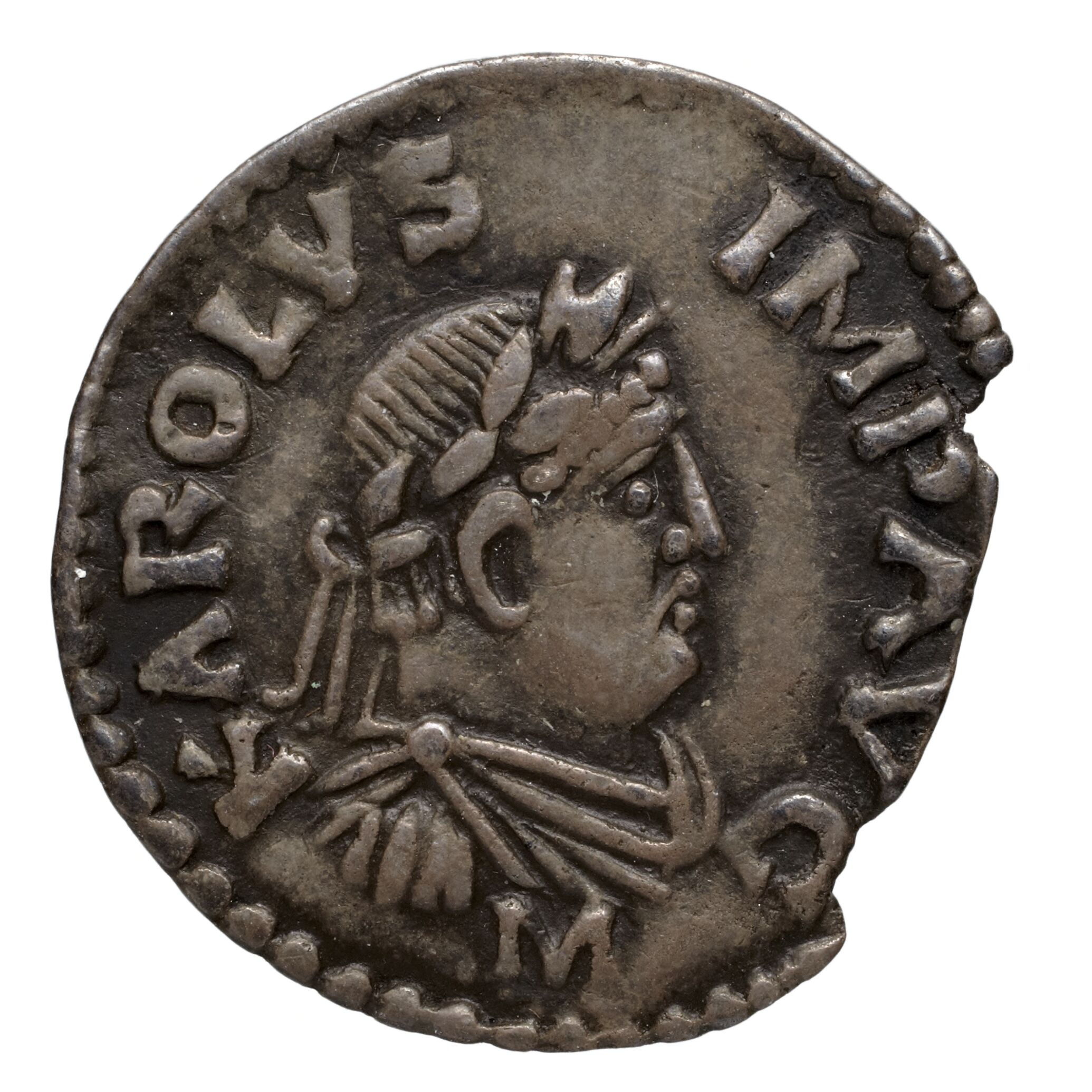
Denarius of Charlemagne, c. 812–814

After Charlemagne was crowned as Holy Roman Emperor in 800, most denarii continued to bear his title as King of the Franks, a title he continued to hold, with the exception of a more limited number of "specials" which has been found bearing his bust and the inscription KAROLUS IMP AVG ("Charles, Emperor Augustus"). Meanwhile, the pound and the schilling remained units of weight or accounting and were not issued as coins. Although some gold coins appeared under Louis the Pious, the silver denarius, also called pfennig remained the most important coin of the Middle Ages.

=== Distribution ===
The new currency also spread to neighbouring countries. At the end of the 8th century, King Offa of Mercia introduced the system into the British Isles to facilitate transactions with the Catholic Church, not least the payment of the tax known as the Alms of St Peter or Peter's Pence, the denier having been renamed the 'penny'. In England, however, the new currency system endured long competition from the Viking coinage system, which was introduced into the Danelaw and was based on settlement in marks. Although the £sd system eventually came to dominate in England, the mark-based system continued to be used in the North Sea region and areas with Hanseatic influence for most of the Middle Ages.

The new three-part system came to dominate most of Europe. In French the three units became known as livre, sous and denier, in Italia as the lira, soldo and denaro, in the German states as the Pfund, Schilling and Pfennig, in the Low Countries as the pond, schelling and penning and in England as the pound, shilling and penny. The English word 'pound' comes from the Latin libra pondo, 'a pound weight'. On the Iberian Peninsula, the Kingdom of Aragon introduced the Carolingian system, rendered in Catalan as the lliura, sou and diner, while the kingdoms of Portugal and Castile (and then Spain) retained the coinage system inherited from Islamic al-Andalus era, where the predominant coin was the maravedi with its various multiples and subdivisions. In the Holy Roman Empire, the name denarius or denar was superseded by pfennig during the 10th century.

=== Subsequent development ===
In the early Middle Ages, only the denarius was physically minted and issued into circulation as an actual coin, while the libra and solidus were purely units of account. Since the coins were initially based solely on a silver standard, it was a monometallic system and, as long as the silver content of the denarius was maintained constantly, any amount of money could be worked out by counting coins instead of weighing silver or gold. But the gradual exhaustion of European silver mines in the 11th century led to a shortage of silver and made it difficult to maintain the value of the coin. The continuous debasement of coins led from the 13th century to the minting of larger coins. It also led to it becoming commonplace to state the origin of the coin in contracts and accounts. A denier parisis minted in Paris, for example, contained more pure silver than the corresponding denier tournois minted in Tours. The unity of the pound weight and the currency pound, achieved under Charlemagne, was increasingly undermined and led to a divergence of the real value of a coin and its nominal value. This followed Gresham's law which argues that "bad money displaces good money". Pfennigs became ever lighter as the heavier coins were melted down for their greater silver content and as mints issued lighter coins to increase their profits.

The fiction that 240 pfennigs made a pfund (pound of silver) was doggedly maintained into the early modern period, but the reality was they weighed considerably less. The same problem affected the Mark which was theoretically worth 120 pfennigs but such was the debasement of the latter that the Mark rose eventually to be worth 160 pfennigs. As well as the weight, the silver content of the coins was deliberately reduced such that pfennigs minted in the Duchy of Austria in the late 15th century were nicknamed Schinderlings ("little floggers", a pejorative term.).

To facilitate larger transactions, gold coins began to be minted in western Europe around the same time – starting in the Italian republics in the mid-13th century ("florins" and "ducats"), and in other kingdoms in the 14th century (e.g. "ecu d'or" in France, the "noble" in England). Gold coins typically represented larger nominal sums, but they also introduced a bimetallic system of currency which depended on the values of two precious metals. The French "franc", introduced in 1360, was the first coin anywhere to represent exactly 1 pfund or "pound". The gold "sovereign", first minted in 1489, was the first English £1 coin.

== Decimalisation ==
Having long abandoned the decimal currency structure of the Roman Empire in favour of Carolingian coinage systems, Europe began to return to decimal currencies in the 18th century.

=== 18th century ===
Russia was the first country to adopt a decimal currency during the reign of Tsar Peter the Great in 1704, under whom the rouble was worth 100 kopecks. The rouble was thus the world's first decimal currency since Roman times. However, there were still non-decimal coins in circulation, the 3 kopeck and 15 kopeck denominations, and these would remain part of Russian, and later Soviet, currency until the 1990s.

France introduced the franc and the centime in 1795, replacing the livre, sou, and denier, abolished during the French Revolution. France introduced decimalisation in a number of countries that it invaded during the Napoleonic period.

=== 19th century ===
In the 19th century, more countries switched to decimal currencies. The Netherlands led the way when the Dutch guilder was decimalised in 1817. Hitherto it had been worth 20 stuivers = 160 duiten = 320 penningen. These coins were scrapped in favour of the cent and there were now 100 centen to the guilder. The last pre-decimal coins were withdrawn from circulation in 1848.

Sweden introduced decimal currency in 1855. The riksdaler was divided into 100 öre. The riksdaler was renamed the krona in 1873.

The Austrian Empire decimalised the Austro-Hungarian florin in 1857, concurrent with its transition from the Conventionsthaler to the Vereinsthaler standard.

Spain introduced its decimal currency unit, the peseta, in 1868, replacing all previous currencies.

=== 20th century ===
Decimalisation continued in the 20th century. For example, Cyprus decimalised the Cypriot pound in 1955, which comprised 1,000 mils, later replaced by 100 cents.

The United Kingdom and Ireland decimalised the pound sterling and Irish pound, respectively, in 1971. (See £sd and Decimal Day.)

Malta decimalised the lira in 1972.

Nigeria was the last country to abandon the Carolingian system, in 1973, when the pound was replaced by the naira.

== See also ==
- British and Commonwealth pound, shilling and pence systems
