= Arimannus =

Warrior clasd of freeman in Lombard and Frankish Italy

The arimanni (singular arimannus) were a warrior class of freemen in Lombard and later Frankish Italy. In contemporary documents arimanni are sometimes denominated as liberi homines (free men) or exercitales (soldiers).

The ranks of the arimanni were originally filled by experienced warriors, the descendants of the Lombard freemen who invaded Italy in 569. The position of the arimanni declined after the Frankish conquest of 774. By the mid-ninth century, many Franks were also arimanni, no longer just Lombards. By the tenth century, the arimanni had declined to a position barely above that of serfs.

The arimanni were typically small or medium landowners with a few tenants, or none, beneath them. They formed the basis of the Italian state as they owed it service, specifically oste et ponte et placito: army, bridge, and court services. This service was not mediated by feudal obligations. The arimanni held public offices at the local level. The Carolingians took a special interest in the obligations and rights of the arimanni as they were foundational to royal control. Lothair I tried to curb the tide of feudalisation by reasserting the public obligations of the arimanni even if landless, making these obligations due to the local count. In a conscious continuation of Carolingain policy, both Guy and Lambert in the 890s created legislation asserting the obligations, especially military, of the arimanni and outlawing the prevalent practice of granting public obligations to vassals as benefices. The concept of arimanni survived into the eleventh century, when certain Tuscan citizens pleaded that status against the claims of the House of Canossa.

== Sources ==
- Cavanna, Adriano. Fara, sala, arimannia nella storia di un vico longobardo. Milano, 1967.
- Gasparri, Stefano. 'Strutture militari e legami di dipendenza in età longobarda e carolingia,' Rivista Storica Italiana 98 (1986), 664–726.
- Gasparri, Stefano. 'La questione degli arimanni,' Bullettino dell’Istituto Storico Italiano per il Medioevo 87 (1978), 121–153.
- Gasparri, Stefano. 'Nobiles et credentes omines liberi arimanni'. Linguaccio, memoria sociale e tradizioni longobarde nel regno italico,' ed. S. Gasparri, Bullettino dell'Istituto storico italiano, Istituto storico italiano 105 (Rome, 2003), 25–51.
- Gasparri, Stefano. 'Il popolo-esercito degli arimanni. Gli studi longobardi di Giovanni Tabacco', Giovanni Tabacco e l'esegesi del passato. Quaderni, Accademia delle Scienze di Torino 14 (Torino, 2006), 21-36.
- Jarnut, Jörg. 'Beobachtungen zu den langobardischen arimanni und exercitales,' Zeitschrift der Savigny-Stiftung für Rechtsgeschichte. Germanistische Abteilung 88 (1971), 1-28.
- Tabacco, Giovanni. I liberi del re nell'Italia carolingia e postcarolingia. Spoleto, 1966.
- Wickham, Chris. Early Medieval Italy: Central Power and Local Society 400-1000. MacMillan Press: 1981.
