= Maginfred I of Milan =

Maginfred I of Milano (IX Century – Milan, 896), also known as Manfred II, was count of Lomello and imperial vicar in Milan from 892 to 901.

== Biography ==
Also known as Manfred di Lomello, he was a descendant of the Frankish counts palatine of Lomello and son of Count Manfred of Mosezzo. His brother Milone became the founder of the Veronese family of Sambonifacio.

In 892, he was appointed Count of Milan by Emperor Guy II of Spoleto and sided against Berengar. When Arnulf of Carinthia descended on Italy in support of Berengar, he entered Milan and Maginfred sided with them and was confirmed in his position in 894. Guy died in the same year and was succeeded by his son Lambert, but Maginfred refused to recognise his authority. In 896 Emperor Lambert besieged Milan, which succumbed despite Maginfred's strenuous defence. He was imprisoned and then beheaded.

== Descendants ==
He married Guntida daughter of the Count of Auriate and had four children:

- Hugo, who may have been the killer of the emperor Lambert.
- Milone (?-980/981), Bishop of Verona a supporter, along with his brother Engelric, of Berengar II.
- One daughter;
- Egelrico, Count of Verona from 955 to 961: also a supporter of Berengar II, he lost the county following the rise of Otto I. In addition to the county of Verona, he may have succeeded his father as Count of Lomello.
