= Arnulf of Carinthia =

Disputed Emperor in Italy (r. 896–899)

- Emperor of the Romans
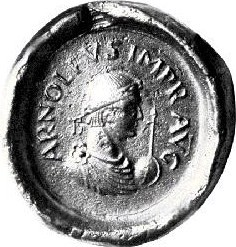
- Seal of Arnulf of Carinthia c. 896

Carolingian Emperor of Italy
- Reign: 22 February 896 – 8 December 899
- Coronation: 22 February 896, Rome
- Predecessor: Lambert
- Successor: Louis the Blind

King of Italy
- Reign: 894 – 8 December 899
- Predecessor: Lambert
- Successor: Louis the Blind

King of East Francia
- Reign: c. 27 November 887 – 8 December 899
- Predecessor: Charles the Fat
- Successor: Louis the Child
- Born: c. 850
- Died: December 8, 899 (aged 48–49); Ratisbon, Duchy of Bavaria, East Francia (now Regensburg, Bavaria, Germany)
- Burial: St. Emmeram's Basilica, Ratisbon
- Spouse: Ota; Oda of West Francia; Vinburge
- Issue: Louis the Child; Ratold of Italy; Zwentibold; Glismut of Carinthia; Hedwig of Carinthia
- House: Carolingian
- Father: Carloman of Bavaria
- Mother: Liutswind
- signum manus (890)

Arnulf of Carinthia (c. 850 – 8 December 899) was King of East Francia since 887, King of Italy since 894, and Emperor since 896. Initially, he was the Duke of Carinthia who overthrew his uncle Emperor Charles the Fat to become the Carolingian king of East Francia in late 887. He also ruled Lotharingia, and tried to impose suzerainty over West Francia, and rule over Burgundy and Italy. In 894, he invaded Italy and took Pavia, but soon returned to East Francia. Upon invading Italy again, he was crowned Emperor on 22 February 896 in Rome by Pope Formosus, but soon returned again to East Francia. He died on 8 December 899 at Ratisbon, in Bavaria. He was the last member of the Carolingian dynasty from the male line to rule in Italy as both King and Emperor, despite his rule being contested by his rivals Lambert of Italy and Berengar I of Italy.

== Early life ==
=== Illegitimacy and early life ===
Arnulf was the illegitimate son of Carloman of Bavaria and Liutswind. (Note: Also Litwinde or Litwindie) After Arnulf's birth, Carloman married before 861, a daughter of Count Ernst, who died after 8 August 879. As it is mainly West-Frankish historiography that speaks of Arnulf's illegitimacy, it is quite possible that the two women are actually the same person, Liutswind, and that Carloman married Arnulf's mother, thus legitimizing his son.

Arnulf was granted the rule over the Duchy of Carinthia, a Frankish vassal state and successor of the ancient Principality of Carantania by his father, after Carloman reconciled with his own father, King Louis the German, and was made king in the Duchy of Bavaria.

Arnulf spent his childhood in Mosaburch or Mosapurc, which is widely believed to be Moosburg in Carinthia. Moosburg was a few miles away from one of the imperial residences, the Carolingian Kaiserpfalz at Karnburg, which had been the residence of the Carantanian princes. Arnulf kept his seat here, and from later events it may be inferred that the Carantanians, from an early time, treated him as their own duke. Later, after he had been crowned King of East Francia, Arnulf turned his old territory of Carinthia into the March of Carinthia, a part of the Duchy of Bavaria.

=== Regional ruler ===
After Carloman was incapacitated by a stroke in 879, Louis the Younger inherited Bavaria, Charles the Fat was given the Kingdom of Italy, and Arnulf was confirmed in Carinthia by an agreement with Carloman. However, Bavaria was already governed by Arnulf during the summer and autumn of 879 while his father arranged his succession. He was also granted "Pannonia", in the words of the Annales Fuldenses, or "Carantanum", in the words of Regino of Prüm. The division of the realm was confirmed in 880 after Carloman's death.

When Engelschalk II of Pannonia in 882 rebelled against Margrave Aribo and ignited the Wilhelminer War, Arnulf supported him and accepted his and his brother's homage. This ruined Arnulf's relationship with his uncle, Emperor Charles the Fat, and put him at war with Svatopluk of Moravia. Pannonia was invaded, but Arnulf refused to give up the young Wilhelminers. Arnulf did not make peace with Svatopluk until late 885, by which time the Moravian ruler was loyal to the emperor. Some scholars see this war as destroying Arnulf's hopes of succeeding Charles the Fat.

== King of East Francia ==
Carolingian Empire after the emergence of regional kingdoms in 887-890, with Arnulf's initial realm in light blue

Arnulf took the leading role in the deposition of Charles the Fat. In November 887, a Diet was meeting at Tribur. Supported by nobles from eastern parts of the Empire, Arnulf seized the opportunity and deposed the ailing Emperor. In the same time, Arnulf was elected and proclaimed as king. Charles agreed to this involuntary retirement, but not without first chastising his nephew for his treachery and asking for a few royal villas in Swabia on which to live out his final months, which Arnulf granted him.

Charles died at the very beginning of 888, and since Arnulf was elected king only by the nobles of East Francia, several questions arose regarding the rule over other regions of the Carolingian Empire. During the spring of 888, Arnulf was staying at Regensburg, where he received nobles and envoys of eastern Franks, Alamanns, Bavarians, Thuringians, Saxons, and the neighboring Slavs, but regions of West Francia, Burgundy, and Italy remained out of his scope, electing their own rulers.

During 889, he held Diets at Forchheim and Frankfurt, trying to secure acceptance among nobles for his sons Zwentibold and Ratold, who were born to him outside of wedlock, and also receiving envoys from Normans and Slavs. In the same year, Arnulf organized an expedition against the Obotrites, a Polabian Slavic tribe, but without success, and thus the conflict continued up to 895, when a peace agreement with the Obotrites was reached.

Like many rulers of the period, Arnulf was heavily involved in ecclesiastical disputes. In 895, at the Diet of Tribur, he presided over a dispute between the episcopal sees of Bremen, Hamburg, and Cologne over jurisdictional authority, which saw Bremen and Hamburg remain a combined see, independent of the see of Cologne.

Arnulf was more a fighter than a negotiator. In 890, he was successfully battling Slavs in Pannonia. In early/mid-891, Vikings invaded Lotharingia and crushed an East Frankish army at Maastricht. Terms such as "Vikings", "Danes", "Northmen" and "Norwegians" have been used loosely and interchangeably to describe these invaders. In September 891, Arnulf repelled the Vikings and essentially ended their attacks on that front. The Annales Fuldenses report that there were so many dead Northmen that their bodies blocked the run of the river. After this victory, Arnulf built a castle on an island in the Dijle river.

=== Interventions in West Francia and Burgundy ===
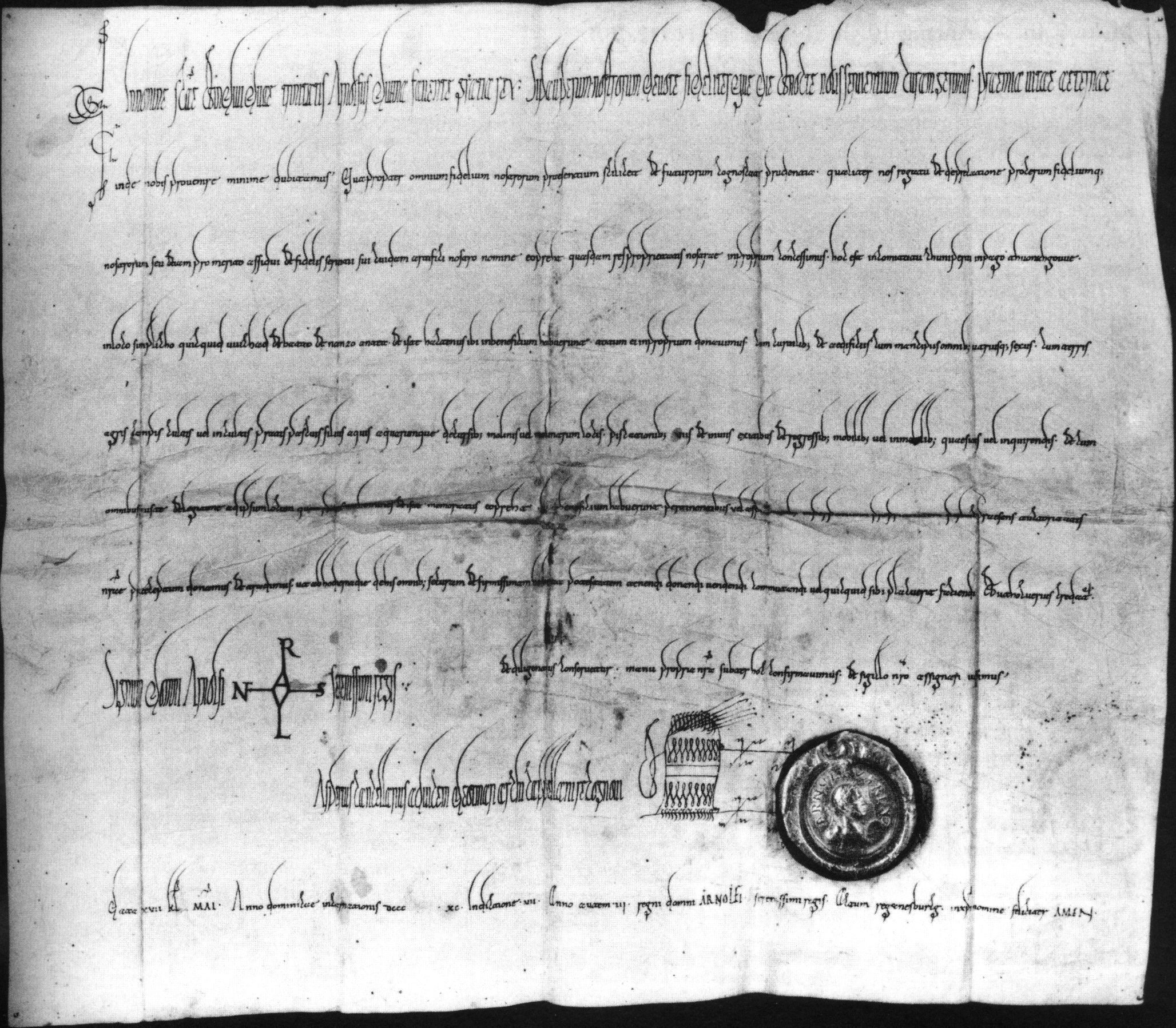
A charter of donation by king Arnulf of Carinthia, issued on 15 April 890 at Regensburg.

Arnulf's policies towards West Francia and Burgundy were marked by various challenges. Upon receiving news of deposition and death of emperor Charles, nobles of West Francia were faced with several choices. Since Carolingian prince Charles was still a child, some magnates gave their initial support to duke Guy of Spoleto, a relative of the Carolingian dynasty, who came from Italy in order to claim the West Frankish throne, but majority opted for count Odo of Paris. He was crowned king of West Francia in February 888 in Compiègne, while Guy was crowned king in Langres in March 888, trying to gain rule over Lotharingia, including Upper Burgundy. Failing to achieve those goals, Guy soon left for Italy, while a group of nobles from Upper Burgundy met at Saint-Maurice and elected local duke Rudolph as king of those Burgundian regions.

Coronations of Guy and Rudolph were conducted without Arnulf's consent, thus initiating long rivalries, that continued for years, while Odo took different approach, recognizing the superiority of Arnulf's position and formally accepting the suzerainty of Arnulf.

In May 889, the queen-dowager Ermengard of Provence arrived to the court of Arnulf at Forchheim, making a submission on behalf of her young son Louis. In August 890, at the regional Diet of Valence, local nobles and bishops from Lower Burgundy and Provence elected Louis as king in those regions, with Arnulf's consent.

In 893, Arnulf switched his support from Odo to young prince Charles the Simple after being persuaded by Fulk, Archbishop of Reims, that it was in his best interests. Arnulf then took advantage of the following fighting between Odo and Charles in 894, harrying some territories of West Francia. At one point, Charles the Simple was forced to flee to Arnulf and ask for his protection. His intervention soon forced Pope Formosus to get involved, as he was worried that a divided and war-weary West Francia would be easy prey for the Vikings.

In 895, Arnulf summoned both Charles and Odo to his residence at Worms. Charles's advisers convinced him not to go, and he sent a representative in his place. Odo, on the other hand, personally attended, together with a large retinue, bearing many gifts for Arnulf. Angered by the non-appearance of Charles, he welcomed Odo at the Diet of Worms in May 895 and again supported Odo's claim to the throne of West Francia.

At the same assembly he crowned his illegitimate son Zwentibold as the king of Lotharingia, including Upper Burgundy, but the Burgundian possessions were out their reach, since those lands were ruled by local kings, Rudolph and Louis.

=== Wars with Moravia ===
As early as 880, Arnulf had designs on Great Moravia and had the Frankish bishop Wiching of Nitra interfere with the missionary activities of the Eastern Orthodox priest Methodius, with the aim of preventing any potential for creating an independent Moravian state. Arnulf had formal relations with the ruler of the Moravian Kingdom, Svatopluk, using them to learn the latter's military and political secrets. Later, these tactics were used to occupy the territory of the Greater Moravian state.

Arnulf failed to conquer the whole of Great Moravia in wars of 892, 893, and 899. Yet, he did achieve some successes. In 893 or 894 Great Moravia probably lost a part of its territory—present-day western Hungary—to him. As a reward, Wiching became Arnulf's chancellor in 892. In 895, the Duchy of Bohemia broke away from Great Moravia and became Arnulf's vassal state. An accord was reached between him and Duke of Bohemia Borivoj I. Bohemia was thus freed from the dangers of Frankish invasion.

In 897, Arnulf received envoys from Sorbs, and also from Bohemians, who were asking again for the royal assistance in their conflicts with the neighboring Moravians.

In his attempts to conquer Moravia, in 899 Arnulf reached out to Magyars who had settled in the Carpathian Basin, and with their help he imposed a measure of control over Moravia.

== King of Italy and Holy Roman Emperor ==
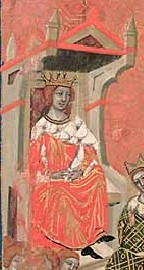
Arnulf of Carinthia, (from the Chronicle of Dalimil, early 14th-century)

In Italy, Berengar of Friuli and Guy III of Spoleto fought over the Iron Crown of Lombardy. Berengar had been crowned king in late 887, but Guy was then crowned in 889. While Pope Stephen V supported Guy, even crowning him Emperor in 891, Arnulf threw his support behind Berengar.

In 892, the new Pope Formosus crowned Guy's son Lambert as co-emperor, but soon came in conflict with them, and sent an embassy to Arnulf, inviting him to come and liberate Italy. Arnulf met the Primores of the Kingdom of Italy, dismissed them with gifts and promised to assist the pope. Arnulf then sent Zwentibold with a Bavarian army to join Berengar. They defeated Guy but were bought off and left in autumn.

When Pope Formosus again asked Arnulf to invade, he personally led an army across the Alps, early in 894. In January 894, Bergamo fell, and Count Ambrose, Guy's representative in the city, was hanged from a tree by the city's gates. Conquering all of the territory north of the Po River, Arnulf forced the surrender of Milan and then drove Guy out of Pavia, where he was proclaimed King of Italy. Arnulf went no further before Guy died suddenly in late autumn, and a fever incapacitated his troops. His march northward through the Alps was interrupted by Rudolph I of Burgundy, and it was only with great difficulty that Arnulf crossed the mountain range. In retaliation, Arnulf ordered Zwentibold to ravage Rudolph's kingdom. In the meantime, Lambert and his mother Ageltrude travelled to Rome to receive papal confirmation of his imperial succession, but when Pope Formosus, still desiring to crown Arnulf, refused, he was imprisoned in Castel Sant'Angelo.

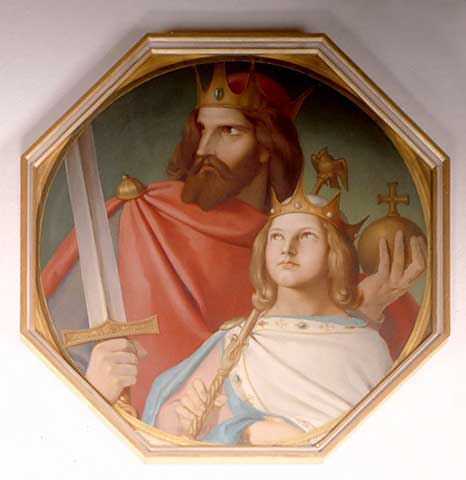
Arnulf of Carinthia and Louis the Child by Johann Jakob Jung (1840)

In September 895, a new papal embassy arrived in Regensburg beseeching Arnulf's aid. In October, Arnulf undertook his second campaign into Italy. He crossed the Alps quickly and again took Pavia, but then he continued slowly, garnering support among the nobility of Tuscany. Maginulf, Count of Milan, and Walfred of Friuli joined him. Eventually even Adalbert II of Tuscany abandoned Lambert. Finding Rome locked against him and held by Ageltrude, Arnulf had to take the city by force on 21 February 896, freeing the pope. Arnulf was then greeted at the Ponte Milvio by the Roman Senate who escorted him into the Leonine City, where he was received by Pope Formosus on the steps of the Santi Apostoli.

On 22 February 896, Formosus led the king into the church of St. Peter, anointed and crowned him as emperor, and saluted him as Augustus. Arnulf then proceeded to the Basilica of Saint Paul Outside the Walls, where he received the homage of the Roman people, who swore "never to hand over the city to Lambert or his mother Ageltrude". Arnulf then proceeded to exile to Bavaria two leading senators, Constantine and Stephen, who had helped Ageltrude to seize Rome.

Leaving one of his vassals, Farold, to hold Rome, two weeks later Arnulf marched on Spoleto, where Ageltrude had fled to join Lambert. However at this point, Arnulf had a stroke, forcing him to call off the campaign and return to Bavaria. Rumours of the time made Arnulf's condition to be a result of poisoning at the hand of Ageltrude.

Arnulf retained power in Italy only as long as he was personally there. On his way north, he stopped at Pavia where he crowned his illegitimate son Ratold as sub-king of Italy, after which he left Ratold in Milan in an attempt to preserve his hold on Italy. That same year Pope Formosus died, leaving Lambert once again in power, and both he and Berengar proceeded to kill any officials who had been appointed by Arnulf, forcing Ratold to flee from Milan to Bavaria. For the rest of his life Arnulf exercised very little control in Italy, and his agents in Rome did not prevent the accession of Pope Stephen VI in 896. The pope initially gave his support to Arnulf but eventually became a supporter of Lambert.

== Final years ==
In addition to after effects of the stroke, Arnulf contracted morbus pediculosis (infestation of pubic lice on his eyelid), which prevented him from effectively dealing with the problems besetting his reign. Italy was lost, raiders from Moravia and Magyars were continually harassing his lands, and Lotharingia was in revolt against Zwentibold. He was also plagued by escalating violence and power struggles among the lower Frankish nobility.

On 8 December 899 Arnulf died at Ratisbon, in present-day Bavaria. He is entombed in St. Emmeram's Basilica at Regensburg, which is now known as Schloss Thurn und Taxis, the palace of the princes of Thurn und Taxis. He was succeeded as the king of East Francia by his only legitimate son from Ota, Louis the Child. After Louis' death in 911 at age 17 or 18, the East Frankish branch of the Carolingian dynasty ceased to exist. Arnulf had had the nobility recognize the rights of his illegitimate sons, Zwentibold and Ratold, as his successors. Zwentibold continued to rule Lotharingia until his murder in 900.

== See also ==
- Family tree of German monarchs
- List of Frankish kings

== Sources ==
- Bouchard, Constance B. (1999). "Burgundy and Provence, 879–1032". The New Cambridge Medieval History. Vol. 3. Cambridge: Cambridge University Press. pp. 328–345. ISBN 978-0-521-36447-8.
- Bowlus, Charles R. (1995). Franks, Moravians, and Magyars: The Struggle for the Middle Danube, 788-907. Philadelphia: University of Pennsylvania Press.
- Duckett, Eleanor (1968). Death and Life in the Tenth Century. Ann Arbor: University of Michigan Press.
- Hauff, Andrea (2017). "The Kingdom of Upper Burgundy and the East Frankish Kingdom at the beginning of the 10th century". History Compass. 15 (8): 1–12.
- Hauff, Andrea (2018). "Carolingian Traditions and New Beginnings: The Coronation of Rudolph I of Upper Burgundy". Bulletin du centre d'études médiévales d'Auxerre. 22 (1): 1–13. Archived from the original on 2023-11-18.
- Mann, Horace, K. The Lives of the Popes in the Early Middle Ages, Vol IV: The Popes in the Days of Feudal Anarchy, 891–999. 1925
- MacLean, Simon (2003). Kingship and Politics in the Late Ninth Century: Charles the Fat and the end of the Carolingian Empire. New York: Cambridge University Press.
- McKitterick, Rosamond (1983). The Frankish Kingdoms Under the Carolingians, 751-987. Harlow: Longman.
- Reuter, Timothy, ed. (1992). The Annals of Fulda. Manchester: Manchester University Press.
- Reuter, Timothy (2013) [1991]. Germany in the Early Middle Ages c. 800–1056. London and New York: Routledge.
- Riché, Pierre (1993). The Carolingians: A Family Who Forged Europe. Philadelphia: University of Pennsylvania Press.
- Schneider, Jens (2010). Auf der Suche nach dem verlorenen Reich: Lotharingien im 9. und 10. Jahrhundert. Köln: Böhlau Verlag.
- Schutz, Herbert (2004). The Carolingians in Central Europe, Their History, Arts, and Architecture: A Cultural History of Central Europe, 750-900. Leiden-Boston: Brill.
- Wickham, Chris (1981). Early Medieval Italy: Central Power and Local Society, 400-1000. Totowa, NJ: Barnes & Noble.

Emperor Arnulf of Carinthia Carolingian dynasty Died: 8 December 899
Regnal titles
| Preceded by Charles the Fat | King of East Francia; 887–899 | Succeeded by Louis the Child |
| Preceded by Lambert | — DISPUTED — (Holy) Roman Emperor; 896–899; Disputed by Lambert II of Spoleto | Succeeded by Louis the Blind |
| Preceded by Lambert | — DISPUTED — King of Italy; 894–899; Disputed by Lambert and Berengar I | Succeeded by Louis the Blind |
| Preceded by Charles the Fat | King of Lotharingia; 887–894 | Succeeded by Zwentibold |
