= Wandalgarius =

Self-portrait

Wandalgarius (or Uandalgarius) was a scribe in the late 8th century. He was active in Lyon or in Alemannia in what is today western Switzerland.

Wandalgarius copied and decorated a collection of legal texts on parchment, now shelfmark Cod. Sang. 731 in the Abbey Library of Saint Gall. The three legal texts are the Lex Romana Visigothorum (LRV), Lex Salica (LS) and Lex Alamannorum (LA). Wandalgarius also included the genealogy of Jesus from the Gospel of Matthew between the LRV and LS. His version of the latter belongs to the reign of Pippin the Short. Appended to it is a list of Frankish kings from Dagobert I to Pippin. His decorations include many inhabited initials and a full-page self-portrait.

Wandalgarius completed the work on Friday, 1 November 793. Since a note page 237 indicates that he began that page on the Wednesday before 1 November, it can be determined that he worked at the rate of about 720 lines of text per day. With 21 lines per page and 342 pages, the manuscript could have been copied in a little over a week. Wandalgarius may have produced his manuscript for a count whose district included a mixed population under Roman, Salic and Alemannian law. Rosamond McKitterick considers that he may have been a notary employed by a count. He has sometimes been identified with a person of the same name listed in the confraternity book of Reichenau for the year 830. The latter was a canon of the church of Saint-Paul de Lyon.

Wandalgarius' manuscript is of interest to numismatists and sigillographers for his unusual decision to use a drawing of Charlemagne's seal for an initial O and to inhabit an initial Q with a man holding a novus denarius (new penny). The manuscript provides a terminus ante quem for the introduction of the new penny.

== Sources ==
- Caskey, Jill; Cohen, Adam S.; Safran, Linda (2022). "Wandalgarius manuscript". Art and Architecture of the Middle Ages: Exploring a Connected World.
- Ganivet, Pierre (2008). "L'épitomé de Lyon: un témoin de la réception du Bréviaire d'Alaric dans le Sud‑Est de la Gaule?". In Michel Rouche; Bruno Dumézil (eds.). Le bréviaire d'Alaric: Aux origines du Code civil. Presses de l'université Paris‑Sorbonne. pp. 279–328.
- Garipzanov, Ildar (2016). "Rgensburg, Wandalgarius and the novi denarii: Charlemagne's Monetary Reform Revisited". Early Medieval Europe. 24 (1): 58–73. doi:10.1111/emed.12133. hdl:10852/59075.
- Kitzinger, Beatrice (2021). "Wandalgarius' Letters of the Law: Figural Initials and Book Culture in the Late Eighth Century". Zeitschrift für Kunstgeschichte. 84 (3): 291–324. doi:10.1515/ZKG-2021-3001.
- McKitterick, Rosamond (1989). The Carolingians and the Written Word. Cambridge: Cambridge University Press.
