= Codex Theodosianus =

Compilation of laws of Roman Empire (438)

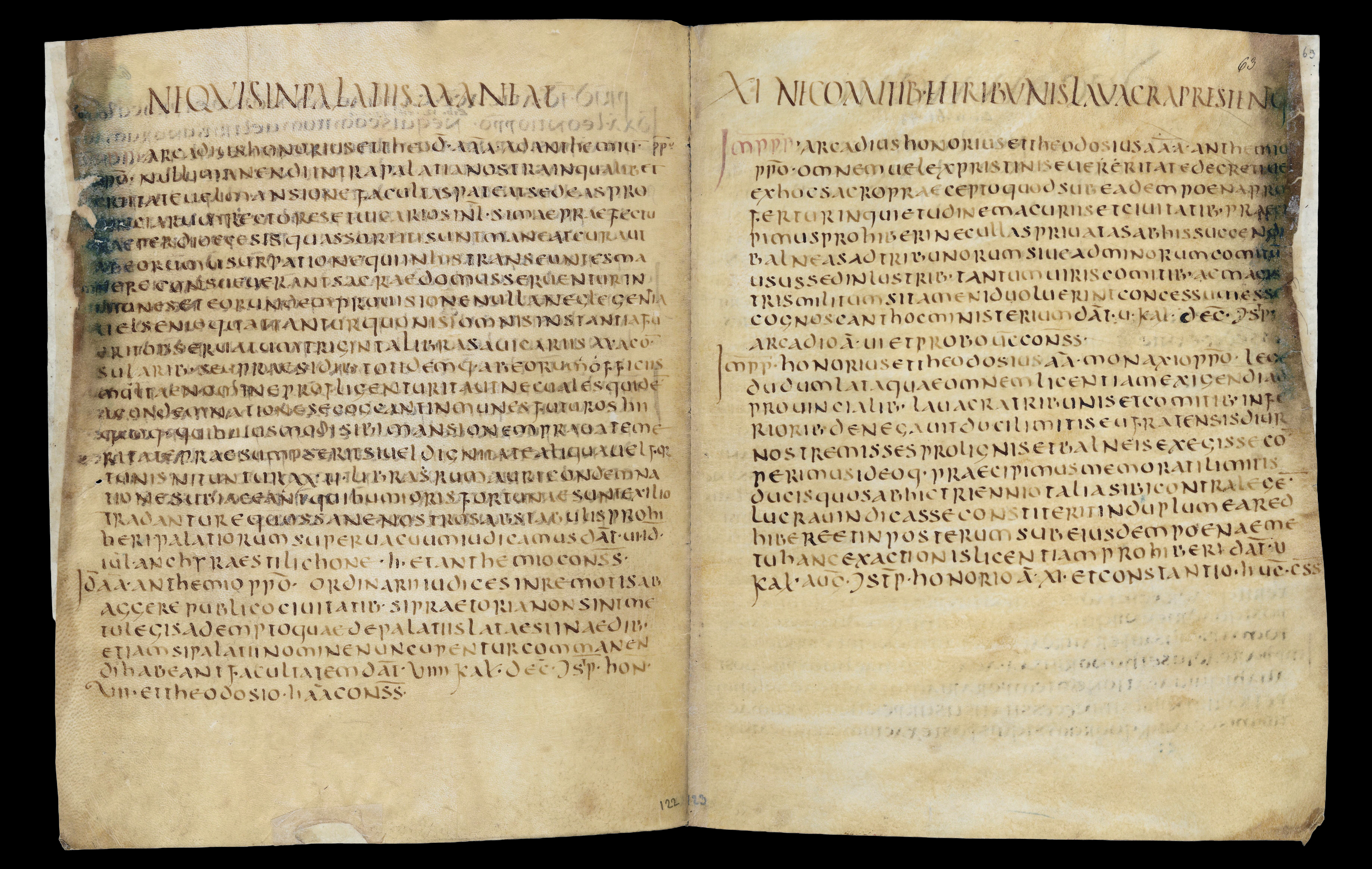
Excerpt (7.10-7.11) from a 6th-century manuscript of books 6-8 of the Codex Theodosianus.

The Codex Theodosianus ("Theodosian Code") is a compilation of the laws of the Roman Empire made by the Christian emperors from 311 A.D. until 437 A.D. (Note: Honoré (1986, p. 133) provides the dates of the first and last laws: CTh 13.10.2 (1 June 311) and CTh 6.23.4 (16 Mar. 437).) A commission was established by Emperor Theodosius II and his co-emperor Valentinian III on 26 March 429 and the compilation was published by a constitution of 15 February 438. It went into force in the eastern and western parts of the empire on 1 January 439. About one-quarter of the original text of the codex is also found in the Breviary of Alaric (also called Lex Romana Visigothorum), (Note: Matthews (2000, p. 87) notes that the Breviarium was the source in which most of the laws of books 1-5 of the Theodosian Code was preserved.) promulgated on 2 February 506 by Visigoth King Alaric II.

== Development ==
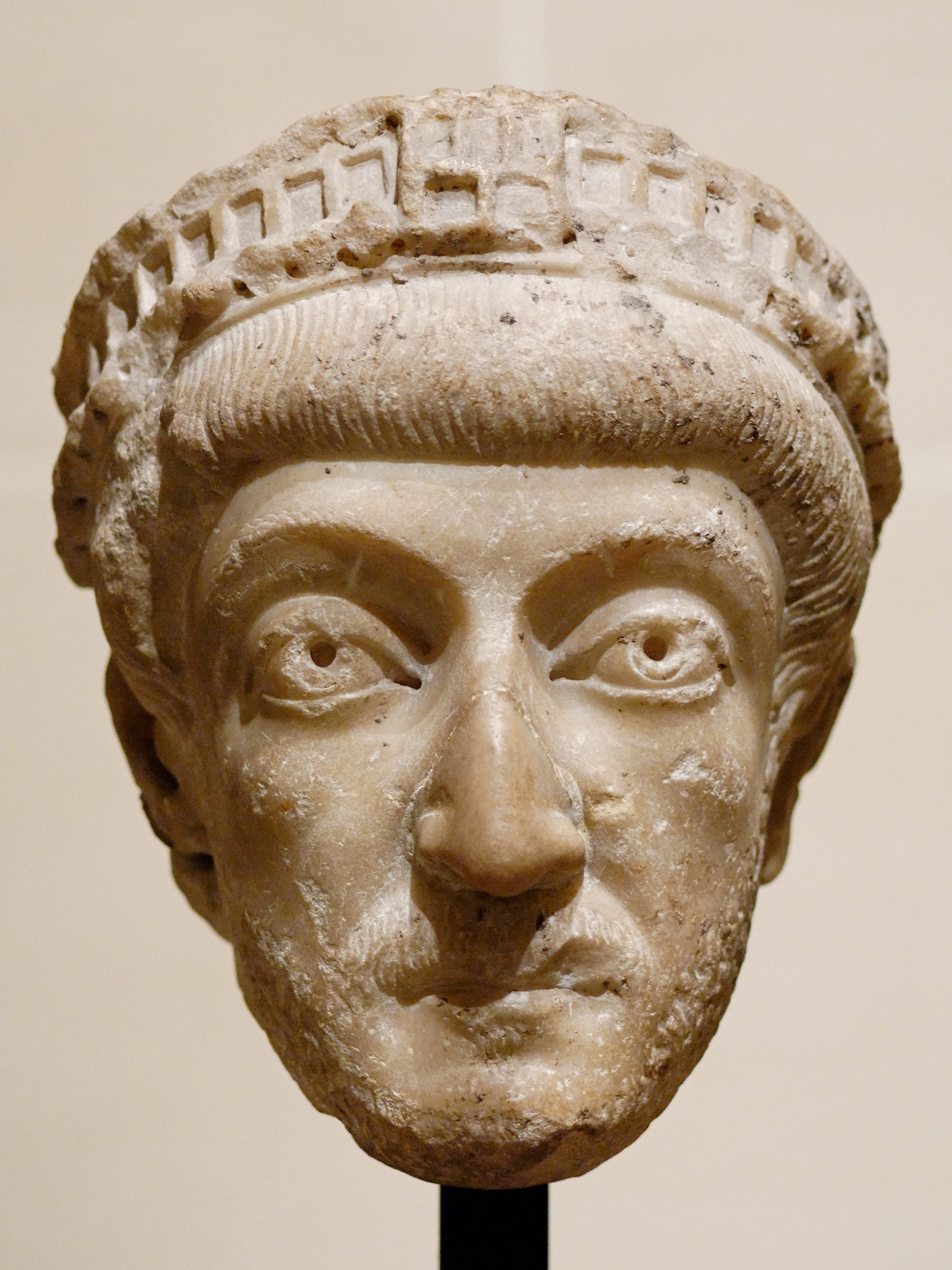
A bust of Theodosius II in the Louvre

On 26 March 429, Emperor Theodosius II announced to the Senate of Constantinople his intention to form a committee to codify all of the laws (leges, singular lex) from the reign of Constantine up to Theodosius II and Valentinian III. The laws in the code span from 311 to 438, so by 438 the "volume of imperial law had become unmanageable". Twenty-two scholars, working in two teams, worked for nine years starting in 429 to assemble what had been to become the Theodosian Code. The chief overseer of the work was Antiochus Chuzon, a lawyer and a prefect and consul from Antioch.

Their product was a collection of 16 books containing more than 2,500 constitutions issued between 311 and 437, while, at the same time, omitting obsolete provisions and superfluous phrases, and making additions, emendations, and alterations. John F. Matthews illustrated the importance of Theodosius' code when he said, "the Theodosian Code was the first occasion since the Twelve Tables on which a Roman government had attempted by public authority to collect and publish its leges." The code covers political, socioeconomic, cultural, and religious subjects of the 4th and 5th centuries in the Roman Empire.

A collection of imperial enactments called the Codex Gregorianus had been written in c. 291–4 and the Codex Hermogenianus, a limited collection of rescripts from c. 295, had been published. The Sirmondian Constitutions may also represent a small-scale collection of imperial laws. However, Theodosius desired to create a more comprehensive code that would provide greater insight into law during the later empire (321–429). Peter Stein states, "Theodosius was perturbed at the low state of legal skill in his empire of the East." Theodosius started a school of law at Constantinople. In 429, he assigned a commission to collect all imperial constitutions since the time of Constantine.

While gathering the vast amount of material, editors often had multiple copies of the same law. In addition to this, the source material the editors were drawing upon changed over time. Clifford Ando notes that according to Matthews, the editors "displayed a reliance on western provincial sources through the late 4th century and on central, eastern archives thereafter."

After 6 years, an initial version was finished in 435 but was not published. Instead, it was improved upon and expanded and finally finished in 438 and taken to the Senate in Rome and Constantinople. Matthews believes that the two attempts are not the result of a failed first attempt; however, the second attempt shows "reiteration and refinement of the original goals at a new stage in the editorial process". Others have put forth alternate theories to explain the lengthy editorial process and two different commissions. Boudewijn Sirks believes that "the code was compiled from imperial copy books found at Constantinople, Rome, or Ravenna, supplemented by material at a few private collections, and that the delays were caused by such problems as verifying the accuracy of the text and improving the legal coherence of the work."

The tone of the work reflected the rhetorical training that the drafters had received, and Averil Cameron has described it as "verbose, moralizing and pretentious".

== Context ==
The code was written in Latin and referred explicitly to the two capitals of Constantinople (Constantinopolitana) and Rome (Roma). It was also concerned with the imposition of orthodoxy – the Arian controversy was ongoing – within the Christian religion and contains 65 decrees directed at heretics.

Initially, Theodosius attempted to commission leges generales beginning with Constantine as a supplement for the Codex Gregorianus and the Codex Hermogenianus. He intended to supplement the legal codes with the opinions and writings of ancient Roman jurists, much like the digest found later in Justinian's Code. But the task proved too great, and in 435, it was decided to concentrate solely on the laws from Constantine to the time of writing.

Matthews observes, "The Theodosian Code does, however, differ from the work of Justinian (except the Novellae), in that it was largely based not on existing juristic writings and collections of texts, but on primary sources that had never before been brought together." Justinian's Code, published about 100 years later, comprised both ius, "law as an interpretive discipline", and leges, "the primary legislation upon which the interpretation was based". While the first part, or codex, of Justinian's Corpus Civilis Juris contained 12 books of constitutions, or imperial laws, the second and third parts, the digest and the Institutiones, contained the ius of Classical Roman jurists and the Institutes of Gaius.

While the Theodosian Code may seem to lack a personal facet due to the absence of judicial reviews, upon further review, the legal code gives insight into Theodosius' motives behind the codification. Lenski quotes Matthews as noting that the "imperial constitutions represented not only prescriptive legal formulas but also descriptive pronouncements of an emperor's moral and ideological principles".

== Christianity ==
Apart from clearing up confusion and creating a single, simplified, and supersedent code, Theodosius II also attempted to solidify Christianity as the Empire's official religion after it had been decriminalised under Galerius' rule and promoted under Constantine's. In his City of God, St. Augustine praised Theodosius the Great, Theodosius II's grandfather, who shared his faith and devotion, as "a Christian ruler whose piety was expressed by the laws he had issued in favor of the Catholic Church".

The Codex Theodosianus is, for example, explicit in ordering that all actions at law should cease during Holy Week, and the doors of all courts of law be closed during those 15 days (1. ii. tit. viii.). It also instituted laws punishing homosexuality, which represented a departure from policy under the period of the Roman Republic, under which homosexuality was tolerated and perhaps mocked but was not illegal.

The first laws granting tax exemption to the church appear in the Codex and are credited to Constantine and his son Constantius II. These laws specify land owned by clergy, their family members, and churches were exempt from compulsory service and tax payments with the exception of land personally owned by the clerics.

== Jews and Judaism ==
The code had a contradictory posture regarding Jews and Judaism. In general, its language is marked by the rhetorical conventions of the patristic contra Iudaeos tradition, describing Judaism as a "feral" and "nefarious sect" and as a "polluting contagion." One provision, 16.8.19, reclassified Judaism as a superstitio and described it as a "perversity alien to the Roman Empire." The code restricted Jewish participation in public life, barred Jews from positions in the military, in the legal profession, and in the imperial service.

Jews were lumped together with pagans and heretics as groups demarcating the limits of acceptable Roman religio, as orthodoxy came to mean not only the right way of being Christian, but the right way of being Roman. However, the code simultaneously contained provisions that set Jews apart from other groups. Historian Paula Fredriksen notes that in the rhetoric of late Roman law, heretics were denounced as "insane" false Christians and pagans as clear outsiders, and that the legal rhetoric sought to establish clear and stable boundaries between groups. The code protected Jewish religious assembly and forbade the appropriation or destruction of synagogues. A ruling of Theodosius I, preserved at 16.8.9, states that the Jewish sect was "prohibited by no law." Fredriksen reads this tension as placing Jews in an ambiguous position within the Christian Roman legal order, one she describes as "an unstable and inconstant tolerance, one that would follow them into the Middle Ages and beyond."

== Sources ==
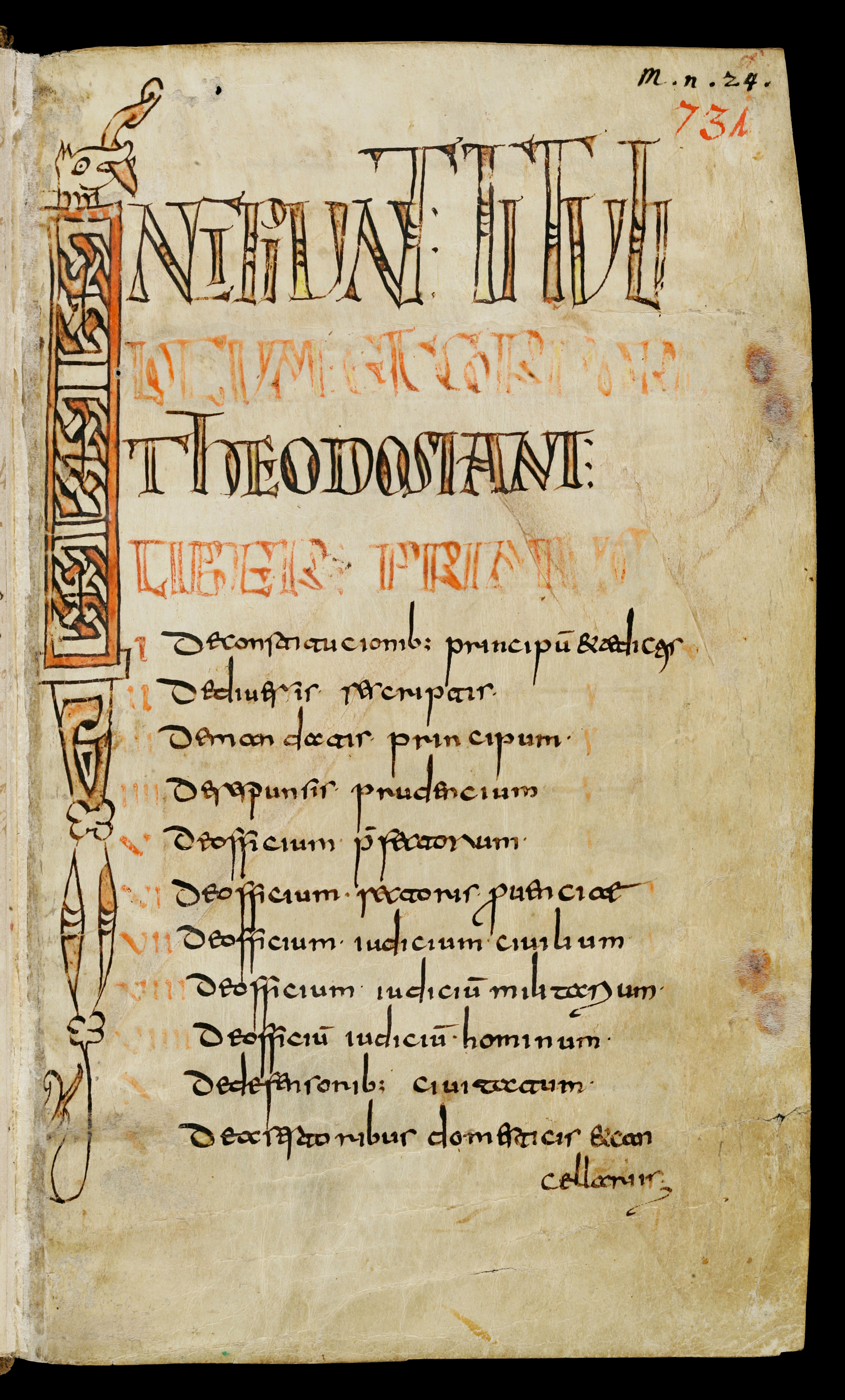
Title page of the Breviary of Alaric in the 8th-century Wandalgarius Codex

Books 1-5 lack the manuscript support available for books 6–16. The first five books of the surviving Codex draw largely from two other manuscripts. The Turin manuscript, or "T", consists of 43 largely discontinuous folios. The second manuscript is the Breviary of Alaric, and a good part of the Breviarium that is included in book 1 contains the original text of the respective part of the original codex.

The latter part of the Codex, books 6–16, also drew largely from two texts. Books 6–8 of the Codex were preserved in the text of a document known as Parsinus 9643. The document circulated in early medieval French libraries, as well as the other formative document for the latter part of the code, a document held in the Vatican (Vat. Reg. 886), also known as "V". Scholars consider this section to have been transmitted completely.

== Editions ==
The reference edition of the Codex Theodosianus is:

- Theodor Mommsen and Paul M. Meyer, Theodosiani libri XVI cum constitutionibus Sirmondianis et leges Novellae ad Theodosianum pertinentes, Berlin, Weidemann, 1905.

Other editions/commentaries

- Codex Theodosianus (in Latin). Genève: Johann Arnold. 1586.
- Iacobus Gothofredus (1616). De statu paganorum sub christianis imperatoribus: seu commentarius ad titulum X de paganis libri XVI codicis Theodosiani (in Latin). Heidelberg: Gotthard Vögelin.

=== English translation ===
The Theodosian Code was translated into English, with annotations, in 1952 by Clyde Pharr, Theresa Sherrer Davidson, and others. (Note: For a description of how this project was carried out, see Jones Hall 2012 See also Kearley 2007, pp. 525, 536–545) This translation was very favorably received by scholars. (Note: For a survey of the reviews, see Kearley 2018, pp. 162–164) 1986, pp. 133–222.

== See also ==
- Epigenius
- International Roman Law Moot Court
- Codices and manuscripts
