= Paris, BN, lat. 4404 =

Medieval manuscript

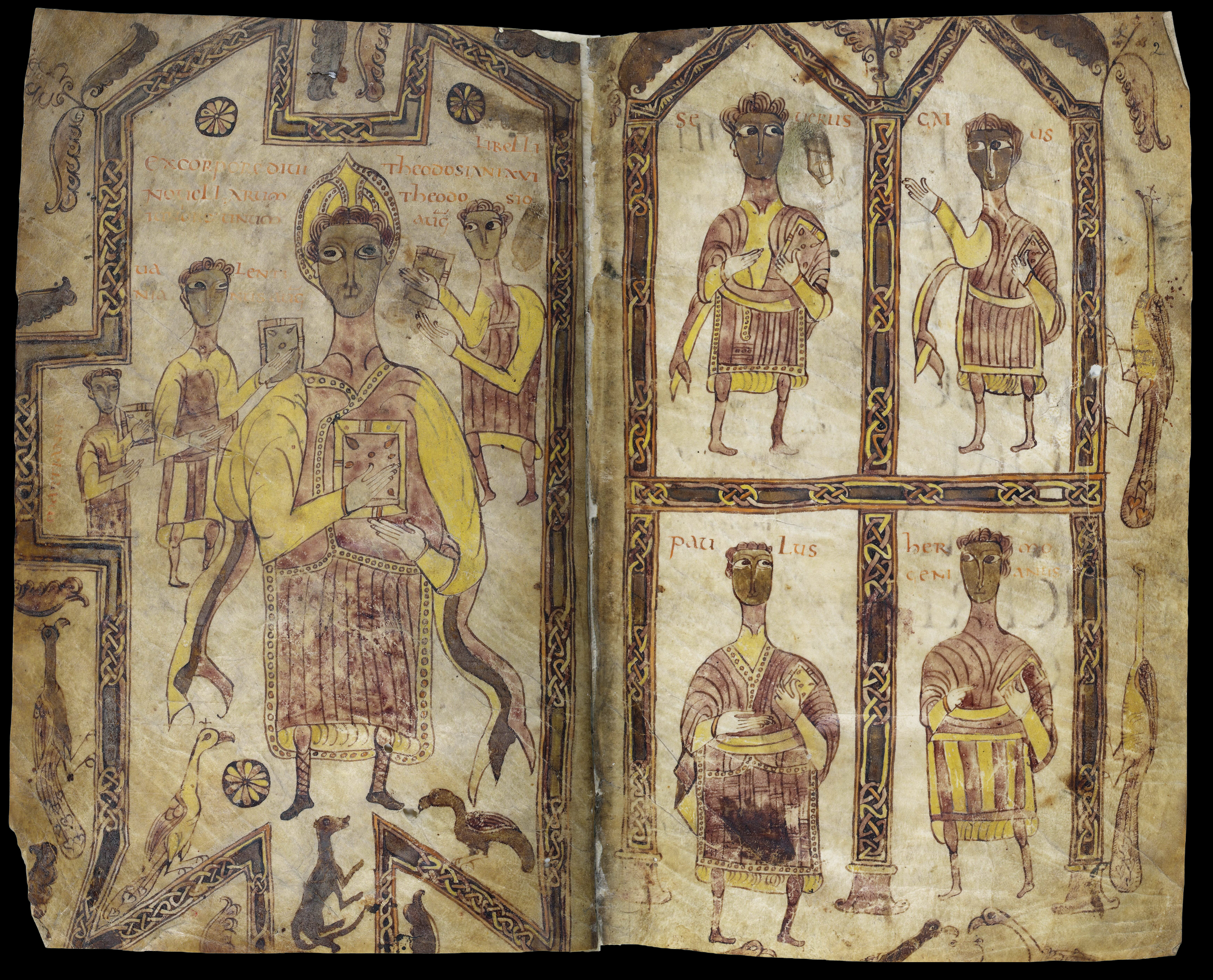
Frontispiece depicting the Roman emperors Theodosius, Valentian, Marcian, and Majorian on the left and Libius Severus on the right. Also on the right are three jurists: Gaius, Paulus, and Modestinus.

Paris, Bibliothèque nationale de France, MS lat. 4404 is a medieval manuscript from the 9th century containing, among other legal texts, the Breviary of Alaric, and is notable also for containing illustrations of rulers.

The earliest examples of illustrations of rulers may have been illuminations in legal manuscripts, with lat. 4404 frequently cited as an instance: its frontispiece depicts Theodosius, Valentian, Marcian, and Majorian. The Breviary of Alaric is the only text in the manuscript with annotations.

The version of the Lex Salica was called a shortened version by Georg Heinrich Pertz, but Jean Marie Pardessus and Georg Waitz referred to it as amplification. Waitz, following Pardessus, refers to the Lex Salica in 4404 as "the only manuscript where no trace of Christianity can be found", apparently neglecting the introduction to the text which speaks of the Franks as a people of God. While those authors saw in the version in 4404 "the most ancient" version of the text, Simon Stein argues that the number of mistakes alone is sufficient to prove that this is not the case.

== Provenance ==
The manuscript hails from Gaul, early 9th century, most likely from Tours or thereabouts. Some date and locate it more precisely—Samuel Collins dates production in 804, in the Tours scriptorium. A note by Étienne Baluze (1630-1718) explains that the manuscript came from Gallia Narbonensis and became part of the library of Jean-Baptiste Colbert (1619-1683). Before that, it was most likely owned by Julien Brodeau (1585-1653), a lawyer from Paris.

== Contents ==
- Breviary of Alaric (or Lex Romana Visigothorum)
- Lex Salica
- Lex Alamannorum
- Lex Ripuaria
