= Epigenius =

Byzantine jurist

Epigenius (5th century AD) was a Byzantine jurist. He was a comes et magister memoriae and belonged to the commission of sixteen, appointed by Emperor Theodosius II in 435 AD, to compile the Theodosian Code, and one of the eight who actually distinguished themselves in its composition.
