= Referendary =

English-language word for a certain position

Referendary is the English form of a number of administrative positions, of various rank, in chanceries and other official organizations in Europe.

== Pre-modern history ==
The office of referendarius (plural: referendarii, from the Latin refero, "I inform") existed at the Byzantine Court. Such officials reported to the Emperor on the memorials of petitioners, and conveyed to the judges the Emperor's orders in connection with such memorials.

During the Frankish Empire's Merovingian period, the official who would later be known as the chancellor (cancellarius) was termed the referendarius. See also Royal Administration of Merovingian and Carolingian Dynasties.

Other medieval kingdoms also had a referendary, e.g., Anianus, who in 506 CE compiled the Breviary of Alaric for that king of the Visigoths.

Later the office proliferated and thus became devalued, as reflected in compound titles differentiating some such offices, e.g., in the Polish-Lithuanian Commonwealth. In later iterations of the Polish state, the title occurred again, e.g., as "referendary of state".

A referendary can also be an official (Grand Chancellor) in an order of knighthood, e.g. the Order of Saint Lazarus.

== Canon law ==
In the Papal Curia Romana (court), the office of referendarius apostolicus ('apostolic referendary') originated in the Middle Ages; their duty was to receive all petitions directed to the Holy See, to report on them to the pope and to tender him advice. The treatment and decision varied according to the nature of the question: if a favour was concerned, it might be either granted or refused; if some dispute, the pope decided whether it should be referred to a judge. The referendarii were entrusted with all arrangements for these papal decisions, which they had to prepare for the pope's signature (signatura).

From these referendarii developed the court of the Signatura (Collegium referendariorum Signaturæ votantium), concerning which there are various papal constitutions. Pope Innocent VIII (1484–92) introduced a distinction between the referendarii on questions of favours and of justice, whence developed the "Signatura gratiæ" and the "Signatura justitiæ", each competent to give final decision within its sphere. Utriusque Signaturae Apostolicae Referendarius (attested for Joseph Simeon Assemani), or shorter referendarius utriusque signaturae (attested for Francesco Sforza Pallavicino), 'Referendary of both signatures', was a specific title in the Roman Curia, apparently combining both competences.

In the court of the "Signatura justitiæ" developed a distinction between the prelates entitled to vote (prœlati votantes) and those whose duties were confined to reporting on individual cases (prœlati referendarii). The whole body gradually lost all practical importance, especially after the loss of the Papal States, and was entirely abolished at the reorganization of the Curia by Pius X.

== Germany ==
In Germany, Referendar refers to:

- a trainee solicitor/attorney undertaking an articled clerkship as part of his/her professional training (Rechtsreferendar),
- a student teacher during the practical period of teacher training (Lehramtsreferendar),
- more generally, individuals going through a preparatory service (Vorbereitungsdienst) or administration-internal traineeship for 'senior service' career positions as public servants (Beamte). This includes different areas of the public sector, for instance police, libraries, archives, administrative technical services, or diplomatic service.

All law graduates must act as Referendars for two years before being admitted to practice. The traineeship is intended to provide practical knowledge that cannot be taught at university. During the trainee phase, law graduates are employed and paid by the state. Trainees pass through different stages, working as a law clerk at different types of courts, for the local public prosecutor's office, and at lawyers' offices. The training comprises several stages that give the Referendar experience working under supervision in various fields of law.

For trainee teachers the preparatory service lasts between 18 and 24 months depending on the state. During this time, Referendars are employed by and paid for by the state as candidates for the 'upper' or 'senior' service ranks as government employees (Beamte), depending on which type of school they are training at. A teacher's traineeship consists of academic courses as well as hands-on teaching. At the end of the traineeship, trainee teachers take their Second State Examination to qualify for government employment as teachers.

== Bibliography ==
- Bruno Katterbach, Referendarii utriusque signaturae a Martino V ad Clementem IX et praelati signaturae supplicationum a Martino V ad Leonem XIII (Vatican City: Bibliotheca apostolica Vaticana, 1931).
- Christoph Weber, Die päpstlichen Referendare 1566-1809: Chronologie und Prosopographie (Stuttgart: Hiersemann, 2004).
- Herbermann, Charles, ed. (1913). "Referendarii" . Catholic Encyclopedia. New York: Robert Appleton Company.
- the 1911 Encyclopædia Britannica (passim)
