= Lex Romana Curiensis =

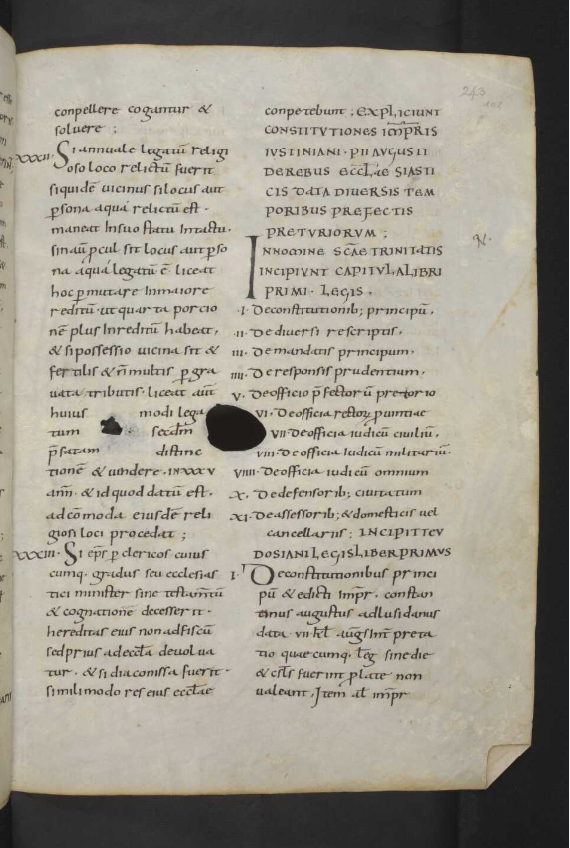
Page where the Lex Romana Curiensis begins in the Verona manuscript. The beginning of the text is in the middle of the right column: In nomine s[an]c[t]ae Trinitatis incipiunt capitula libri primi legis (In the name of the Holy Trinity, the chapters of the first book of the law begin...).

The Lex Romana Curiensis ("Roman Law of Chur"), also known as the Lex Romana Raetica, (Note: "Raetian Roman Law", sometimes Lex Romana Raetica Curiensis.) Lex Romana Utinensis (Note: "Roman Law of Udine".) or Epitome Sancti Galli, (Note: "Epitome of Saint Gall".) is a Latin legal treatise of the eighth century from the region of Churraetia. It was not a law code in force, but a handbook for use in legal education. Nonetheless, it may be the basis of the Raetian lex et consuetudo (law and custom) that Charlemagne confirmed in the early 770s.

== Contents ==
The Lex Romana Curiensis is an epitomization of the Breviary of Alaric (506). It is divided into 27 books. It does not treat all the material in the Breviary, perhaps because its source was itself an epitomized version. It does not contain sections on some of the so-called Sentences of Paul, the Codex Gregorianus, the Codex Hermogenianus or the Responsa of Papinian. The differences between the Lex and the Breviary stem not from the rhetorical choices of the creator of the former, but from the deficiencies in his legal education. He did not fully understand Roman law. The Lex is therefore usually presented as an example of customary West Roman vulgar law committed to writing.

For example, the Lex cites the Roman Law of Citations of 426, but whereas the original law says that judges should follow the majority interpretation of the law and where there was none that of Papinian, the redactor of the Lex says that he who brings the most oath-helpers to court wins and that ties should be decided in favour of whoever could cite the Lex Papianus, that is, the Lex Romana Burgundionum. In other places, the text bears marks of Germanic legal influence.

== Origins and manuscript history ==
The date and place of composition of the Lex Romana Curiensis are disputed, although most scholars today favour an eighth-century origin in Churraetia. Earlier scholars placed its composition anywhere between the middle of the eighth century and the middle of the ninth and anywhere from Churraetia to Lombardy, Istria or southern Germany. According to Paul Vinogradoff, it "is a statement of legal custom, drawn up for the Romance population of Eastern Switzerland, and used in the Tyrol and Northern Italy as well." Modern scholars favour an early eighth-century date. The Croatian historian Lujo Margetić claims it was produced under Charlemagne around 803 as a "legal handbook" for the lands of the former Avar Khaganate.

The Lex Romana Curiensis is preserved in full in three manuscripts as well as two fragments. Two of the manuscripts were made in Churraetia and are now in the archives of Pfäfers Abbey and the Abbey of Saint Gall. (Note: St Gall: Stiftsarchiv Kloster Pfäfers, XXX and Stiftsbibliothek, 722.) The other is originally from Verona, (Note: Codex Utinensis: Leipzig, Universitätsbibliothek, 3493 + 3494 [Hänel, 8+9].) although it was kept for a long time first at Aquileia and later at Udine, whence it was taken by Gustav Friedrich Hänel to Germany in the nineteenth century. Since then it has resided in Leipzig. The copying of the Veronese manuscript has been associated with the reign of Lambert in Italy. The two fragmentary texts (Note: Milan: Biblioteca Ambrosiana, O. 55 sup. and San Ambrogio, Archivio Capitolare, s.n.) are both from Milan.

The editio princeps (first edition) of the Lex Romana Curiensis was published by Paolo Canciani in 1789 from the Verona manuscript. Since the work did not have a title in the manuscript, he gave it the name Lex Romana by which it has been known ever since. He classified it among the leges barbarorum (laws of the barbarians).

== Editions ==
- Canciani, Paolo (ed.). "Lex Romana". Barbarorum leges antiquae cum notis et glossariis, Vol. 4, pp. 469–510. Venice, 1789.
- Zeumer, Karl (ed.). "Lex Romana Raetica Curiensis". Monumenta Germaniae Historica, Leges V, pp. 289–444. Hanover, 1888.
- Meyer-Marthaler, Elisabeth (ed.). Die Rechtsquellen des Kantons Graubünden: Lex Romana Curiensis. Aarau, 1959.
