= Lex Alamannorum =

Medieval law codes of the Alamanni

Start of the Lex Alamannorum in the Wandalgarius Codex of 793/4

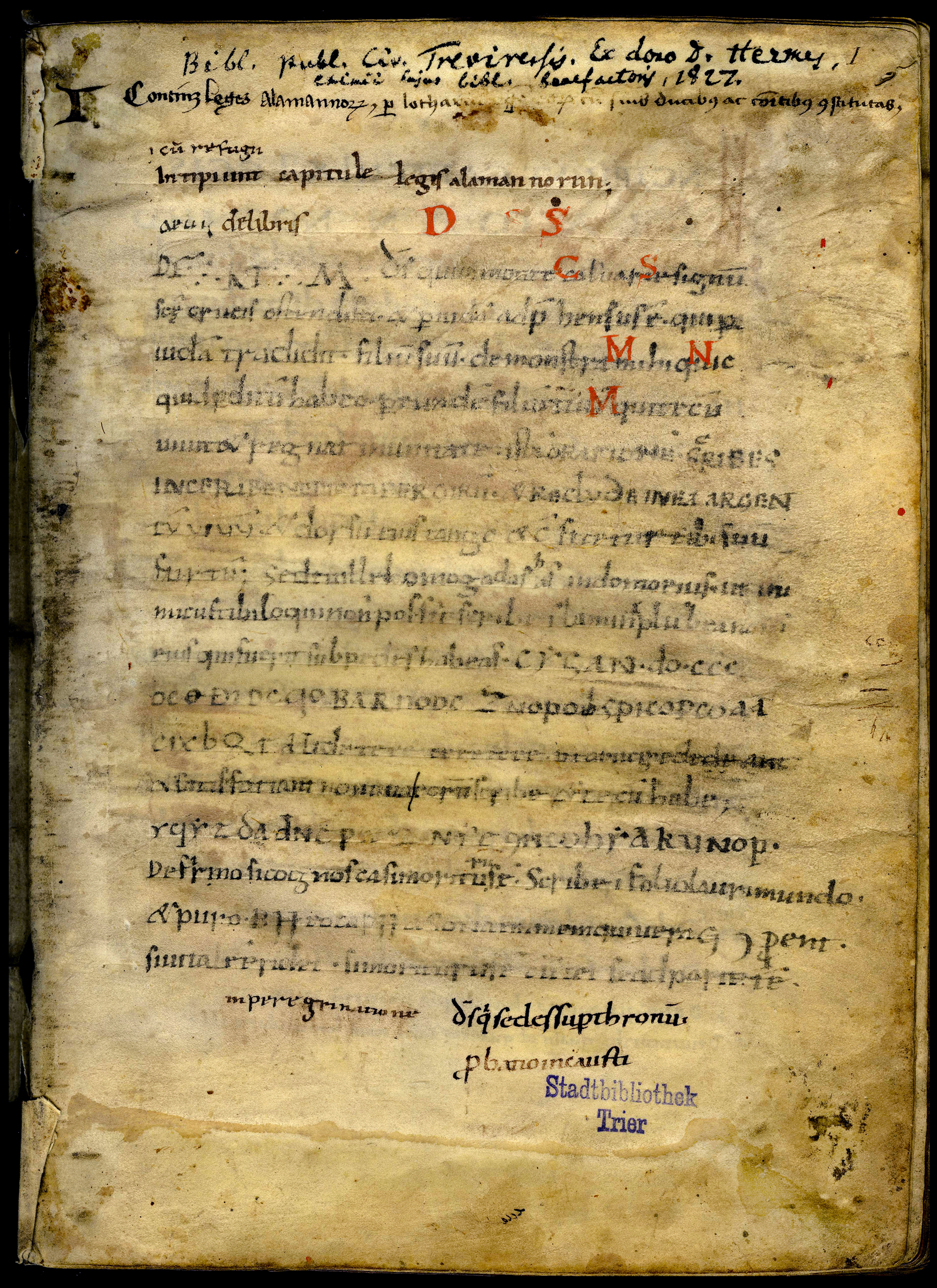
Manuscript of the Lex Alamannorum from the 9th century, today in the Scientific Library of the City of Trier

The Lex Alamannorum and Pactus Alamannorum were two early medieval law codes of the Alamanni. They were first edited in parts in 1530 by Johannes Sichard in Basel.

== Pactus Alamannorum ==
The Pactus Alamannorum or Pactus legis Alamannorum is the older of the two codes, dating to the early 7th century. It is preserved in a single manuscript of the 9th to 10th century (Paris, Bibliothèque Nationale de France, MS Lat. 10753).

== Lex Alamannorum ==
The Lex Alamannorum is preserved in some 50 manuscripts dating to between the 8th and 12th centuries. The text's first redaction is ascribed to the Alamannic duke Lantfrid in ca. 730. It is divided into clerical law, ducal law and popular law.

Chapter 3.1 treats church asylum: no fugitive seeking refuge in a church should be removed by force, or be killed within the church. Instead, the pursuers should assure the priest that the fugitive's guilt is forgiven. In 3.3, penalties for the violation of the asylum are set at 36 solidi to be paid to the church and an additional 40 solidi to be paid to the authorities for violation of the law.

Chapter 56.1 regulates penalties for violence towards women. If someone uncovers the head of a free, unmarried woman, he is fined 6 solidi. If he lifts her dress so that her genitals or her buttocks become visible, he is fined 12 solidi. If he rapes her, he is fined 40 solidi. 56.2 doubles these penalties if the victim is a married woman.

== See also ==
- Germanic law
- Paris, BN, lat. 4404
