= Lambert of Italy =

Emperor in Italy from 891 to 898

- Emperor of the Romans
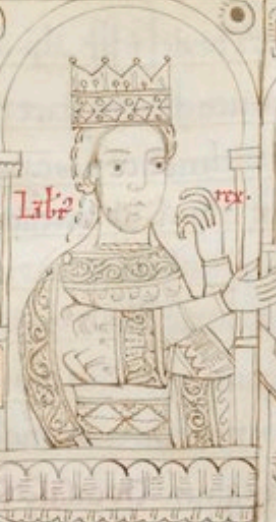
- Lambert depicted as one of the kings who had favoured and protected the abbey of San Clemente a Casauria. From the Chronicon Casauriense, 12th-century manuscript

Emperor in Italy King of Italy
- Reign: 891–898
- Coronation: 30 April 892, Ravenna
- Predecessor: Guy III of Spoleto
- Successor: Arnulf of Carinthia
- Born: c. 880
- Died: 15 October 898 (aged c. 17/18); Spinetta Marengo, Italy
- Burial: Piacenza
- House: Guideschi
- Father: Guy III of Spoleto
- Mother: Ageltrude
- Signum manus

Lambert (Italian: Lamberto; c. 880 – 15 October 898) was the King of Italy from 891, Emperor, co-ruling with his father from 892, and Duke of Spoleto and Camerino (as Lambert II) from his father's death in 894. He was the son of Guy III of Spoleto and Ageltrude, born in San Rufino. He was the last ruler to issue a capitulary in the Carolingian tradition.

== Reign ==
=== Succession and early reign ===
Lambert was crowned king in May 891 at Pavia and joint emperor alongside his father on 30 April 892 at Ravenna by a reluctant Pope Formosus. He and his father signed a pact with the pontiff confirming the Donation of Pepin and subsequent Carolingian gifts to the papacy. In 893, however, Formosus sent an embassy to Regensburg to request Arnulf of Carinthia liberate Italy and come to Rome to be crowned. Arnulf sent his son Zwentibold with a Bavarian army to join with Berengar of Friuli. They defeated Guy, but bribes, along with an outbreak of fever, saw him leave in the autumn. Arnulf then personally led an army across the Alps early in 894. He conquered all of the territory north of the Po River, but went no further before Guy died suddenly in late autumn. Lambert became sole king and emperor, as well as succeeding his father to the Duchy of Spoleto. Still young though, he was left under the regency of his mother, a staunch anti-German. While Berengar occupied Pavia, Lambert and Ageltrude travelled to Rome to receive papal confirmation of his imperial title, but Pope Formosus wanted instead to crown Arnulf and was imprisoned in the Castel Sant'Angelo.

Lambert was preoccupied in thwarting the attempts of both Arnulf of Carinthia and Berengar of Friuli to take Italy for themselves during his reign. Early on, Adalbert II of Tuscany rallied to his cause, menacing Berengar in Pavia. By January 895, Lambert could take up residence in the royal capital. In that same year, his cousin Guy IV conquered the Principality of Benevento from the Byzantines. Despite the urging of Fulk of Rheims on his behalf, Lambert found himself abandoned by the Pope, who feared the increased power of the Spoletan house. In September, an embassy arrived in Regensburg beseeching Arnulf's aid. In October, Arnulf undertook his second campaign into Italy. He crossed the Alps quickly and took Pavia, but then he continued slowly. While Lambert refused to offer battle, Arnulf was garnering support among the nobility of Tuscany. Even Adalbert joined him. Finding Rome locked against him and held by Ageltrude, Arnulf took the city by force on 21 February 896, freeing the pope. Arnulf was there crowned King and Emperor by Pope Formosus, who declared Lambert deposed. Arnulf marched on Spoleto, where Ageltrude had fled to Lambert, but Arnulf suffered a stroke and had to call off the campaign. That same year, Formosus died, leaving Lambert once again in power.

=== Renovatio regni Francorum ===
After Arnulf returned to Germany and until his death, Lambert and his supporters, most powerful in the northeast and the centre of the peninsula, were in complete control of Italy. He retook Pavia and decapitated Maginfred I of Milan, who had joined Arnulf. In October and November, he met Berengar outside of Pavia and the two reached an agreement whereby they parcelled the kingdom out between them, Berengar keeping the realm between the Adda and the Po and Lambert the rest. They shared Bergamo. This was a confirmation of the status quo of 889. Lambert also pledged to marry Gisela, Berengar's daughter. It was this partitioning which caused the later chronicler Liutprand of Cremona to remark that the Italians always suffered under two monarchs.

In early 897, Lambert journeyed to Rome with Ageltrude and Guy to receive reconfirmation of his imperial title. The vengeful Lambert and Ageltrude also persuaded Pope Stephen VI, elected by their influence, to put the corpse of Formosus on trial for various crimes. The body, stripped of its papal robes and mutilated, was thrown into the river Tiber after the "Cadaver Synod." In January 898, Pope John IX rehabilitated Formosus against their will. Lambert convened a diet at Ravenna in February. Seventy bishops met and confirmed the pact of 891, the invalidity of Arnulf's coronation, and the validity of Lambert's imperial title. They legitimised the election of John IX. They also solved the Formosan question and confirmed his rehabilitation. Most significantly for Lambert, however, they reaffirmed the Constitutio Romana of Lothair I (824), which required the imperial presence at papal elections.

Lambert hereafter governed with the church and continued the policy of his father of renovatio regni Francorum: renewal of the Frankish kingdom. He was able to issue capitularies in the Frankish fashion as his father had done. In fact, he was the last ruler to do so. In 898, he legislated against the exploitation of the services owed by arimanni to create benefices for vassals. The Lex Romana Utinensis was composed at his court. His rule was recognized in Benevento after the restoration of Prince Radelchis II in 897.

=== Death and legacy ===
However, Lambert still had to face Berengar of Friuli and the rebellious Adalbert of Tuscany. In 898, the latter marched on Pavia. The emperor, who had been hunting near Marengo south of Milan, was given advance word. Lambert surprised and defeated his rival at Borgo San Donnino, taking him prisoner to Pavia. On his return to Marengo however, he was killed, either by assassination (by Hugo, son of Maginfred), a theory about which Liutprand, our primary source, is reserved, or by falling from his horse. He was buried in Piacenza. Liutprand remembered him as an elegans iuvenis and vir severus: "an elegant youth and a stern man". His epitaph (in Latin elegiac couplets) is:

Sanguine præcipuō Francōrum germinis ortus Lambertus fuit hīc Caesar in Urbe potēns Alter erat Cōnstantīnus, Theodōsius alter Et prīnceps pācis clārus amōre nimis	Born with the distinguished blood of the stock of the Franks, Lambert was here Emperor, holding power in the City (of Rome); He was another Constantine, another Theodosius, and a prince of peace, excessively renowned with love.

He was succeeded in Spoleto by Guy IV while the regnum Italicum and the imperium Romanum were thrown into chaos, contested by multiple candidates. Within days, Berengar had taken Pavia.

== Sources ==
- Carpegna Falconieri, Tommaso di. Lamberto. Dizionario Biografico degli Italiani, LXIII. Rome: 2004, pp. 208–211.
- Comyn, Robert. History of the Western Empire, from its Restoration by Charlemagne to the Accession of Charles V, Vol. I. 1851
- Fasoli, Gina (1949). I re d'Italia (888-962) (in Italian). Firenze: G.C. Sansoni - Editore. pp. 31–55.
- Kreutz, Barbara (1996). Before the Normans: Southern Italy in the Ninth and Tenth Centuries. University of Pennsylvania Press.
- Mann, Horace K (1925). The Lives of the Popes in the Early Middle Ages, Vol. III: The Popes During the Carolingian Empire, 858–891.
- Mann, Horace K (1925). The Lives of the Popes in the Early Middle Ages, Vol. IV: The Popes in the Days of Feudal Anarchy, 891–999.
- Wickham, Chris. Early Medieval Italy: Central Power and Local Society 400–1000. MacMillan Press: 1981.

Emperor Lambert House of Guideschi Born: c. 880 Died: 15 October 898
Regnal titles
Preceded by Guy	Holy Roman Emperor; 892–898	Succeeded by Arnulf
Preceded by Guy	King of Italy; 891–898	Succeeded by Arnulf
Italian nobility
Preceded by Guy III	Duke of Spoleto; 894–898	Succeeded by Guy IV
Preceded by Guy III	Margrave of Camerino; 894–898	Succeeded by Guy IV
