= Breviary of Alaric =

6th-century collection of Roman law

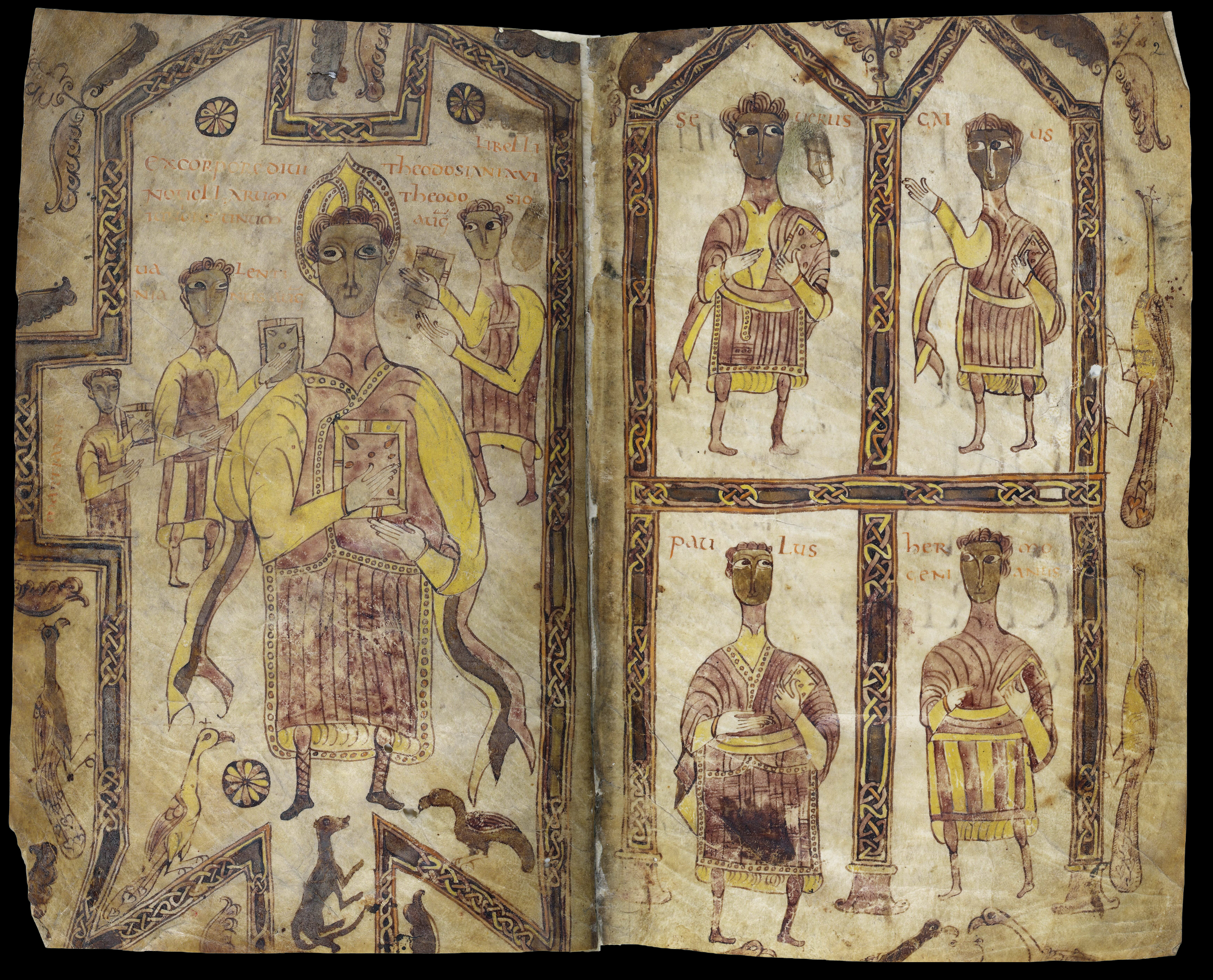
Frontispiece for the Breviary of Alaric painted by Audgarius in a manuscript from 803–814

The Breviary of Alaric (Breviarium Alaricianum or Lex Romana Visigothorum) is a collection of Roman law, compiled by Roman jurists and issued by referendary Anianus on the order of Alaric II, King of the Visigoths, with the approval of his bishops and nobles. It was promulgated on 2 February 506, the 22nd year of his reign. It applied not to the Visigothic nobles who lived under their own law, which had been formulated by Euric, but to the Hispano-Roman and Gallo-Roman population living under Visigoth rule south of the Loire and, in Book 16, to the members of the trinitarian Catholic Church; the Visigoths were Arian and maintained their own clergy.

== Significance ==
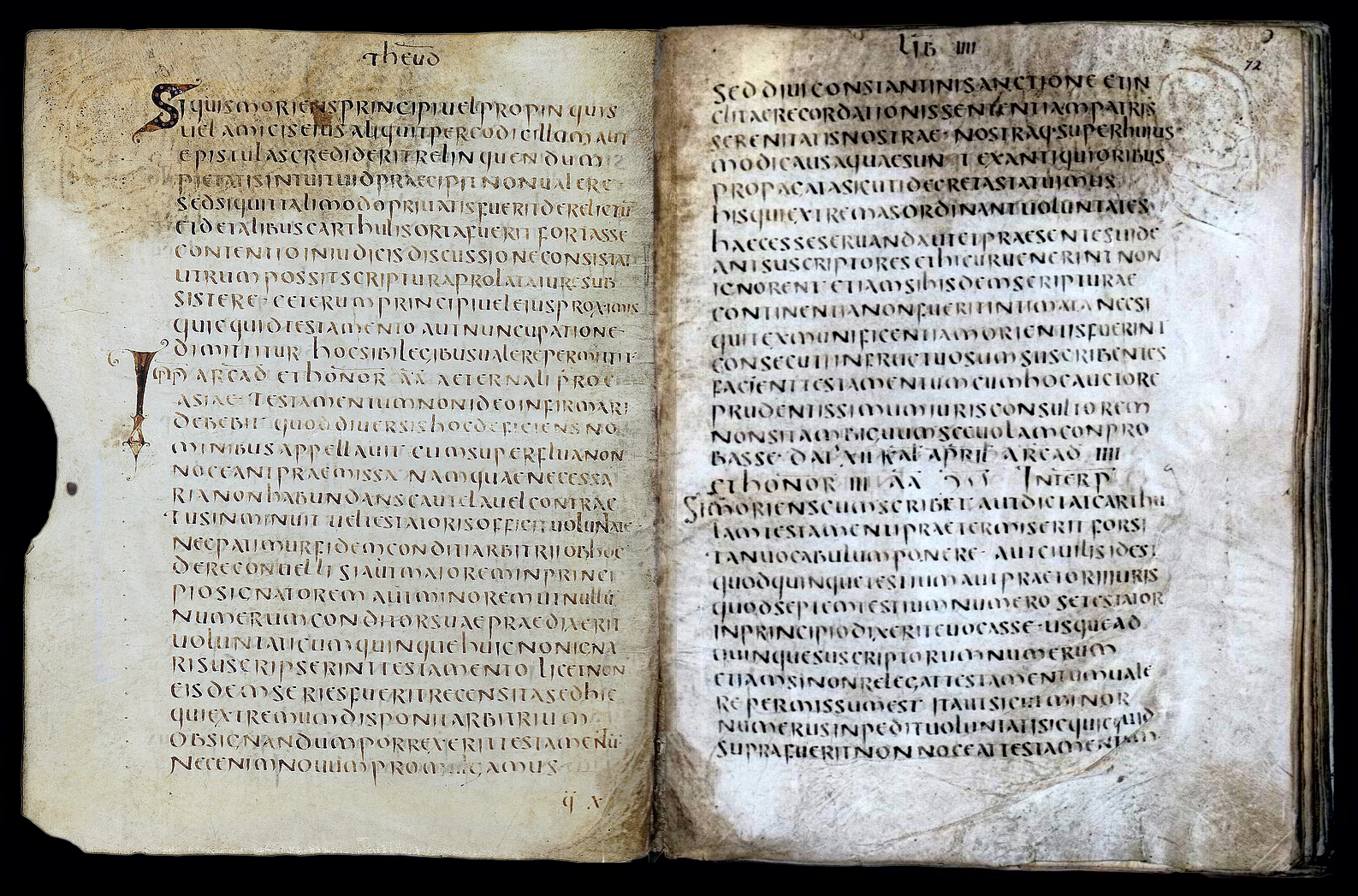
Excerpt from Codex Theodosianus Book IV in the Breviary of Alaric from a 6th-century manuscript.

It is termed a code (codex), in the certificate of Anianus, the king's referendary, but unlike the code of Justinian, from which the writings of jurists were excluded, it comprises both imperial constitutions (leges) and juridical treatises (jura). From the circumstance that the Breviarium has prefixed to it a royal rescript (commonitorium) directing that copies of it, certified under the hand of Anianus, should be received exclusively as law throughout the kingdom of the Visigoths, the compilation of the code has been attributed to Anianus by many writers, and it is frequently designated the Breviary of Anianus (Breviarium Aniani).

The code, however, appears to have been known amongst the Visigoths by the title of Lex Romana or Lex Theodosii, and it was not until the 16th century that the title of Breviarium was introduced to distinguish it from a recast of the code, the Lex Romana Curiensis which was introduced into northern Italy in the 9th century for the use of the Romans in Lombardy. This recast of the Visigothic code was published in the 18th century for the first time by Paolo Canciani in his collection of ancient laws entitled Barbarorum Leges Antiquae. Another manuscript of this Lombard recast of the Visigothic code was discovered by Gustav Friedrich Hänel in the library of St Gall.

The chief value of the Visigothic code is as a source for Roman Law, including the first five books of the Theodosian Code (Codex Theodosianus), five books of the Sententiae Receptae of Julius Paulus. Until the discovery of a manuscript in the chapter library in Verona, which contained the greater part of the Institutes of Gaius, it was the only known work containing the institutional writings of Gaius, an important ancient Roman jurist.

The Breviary had the effect of preserving the traditions of Roman law in Aquitania and Gallia Narbonensis, which became both Provence and Septimania, thus reinforcing their sense of enduring continuity, broken in the Frankish north.

== Contents ==
The Breviary of Alaric comprises:

- sixteen books of the Codex Theodosianus;
- the novels (decrees) of –
  - Theodosius II,
  - Valentinian III,
  - Marcian,
  - Majorian and
  - Libius Severus;
- the institutes of Gaius;
- five books of the Sententiae Receptae of Julius Paulus;
- thirteen titles of the Codex Gregorianus;
- two titles of the Codex Hermogenianus; and
- a fragment of the first book of the Responsa Papiniani.

== See also ==
- Paris, BN, lat. 4404
