= Visigothic Kingdom =

418–720 kingdom in Iberia

Kingdom of the Visigoths Regnum Gothorum (Latin)
- 418–721
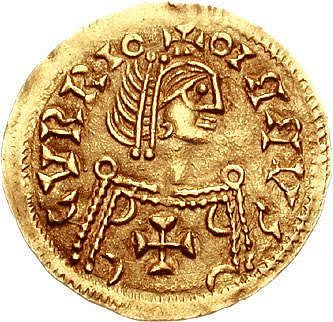
- Tremissis depicting Liuvigild (569–586)

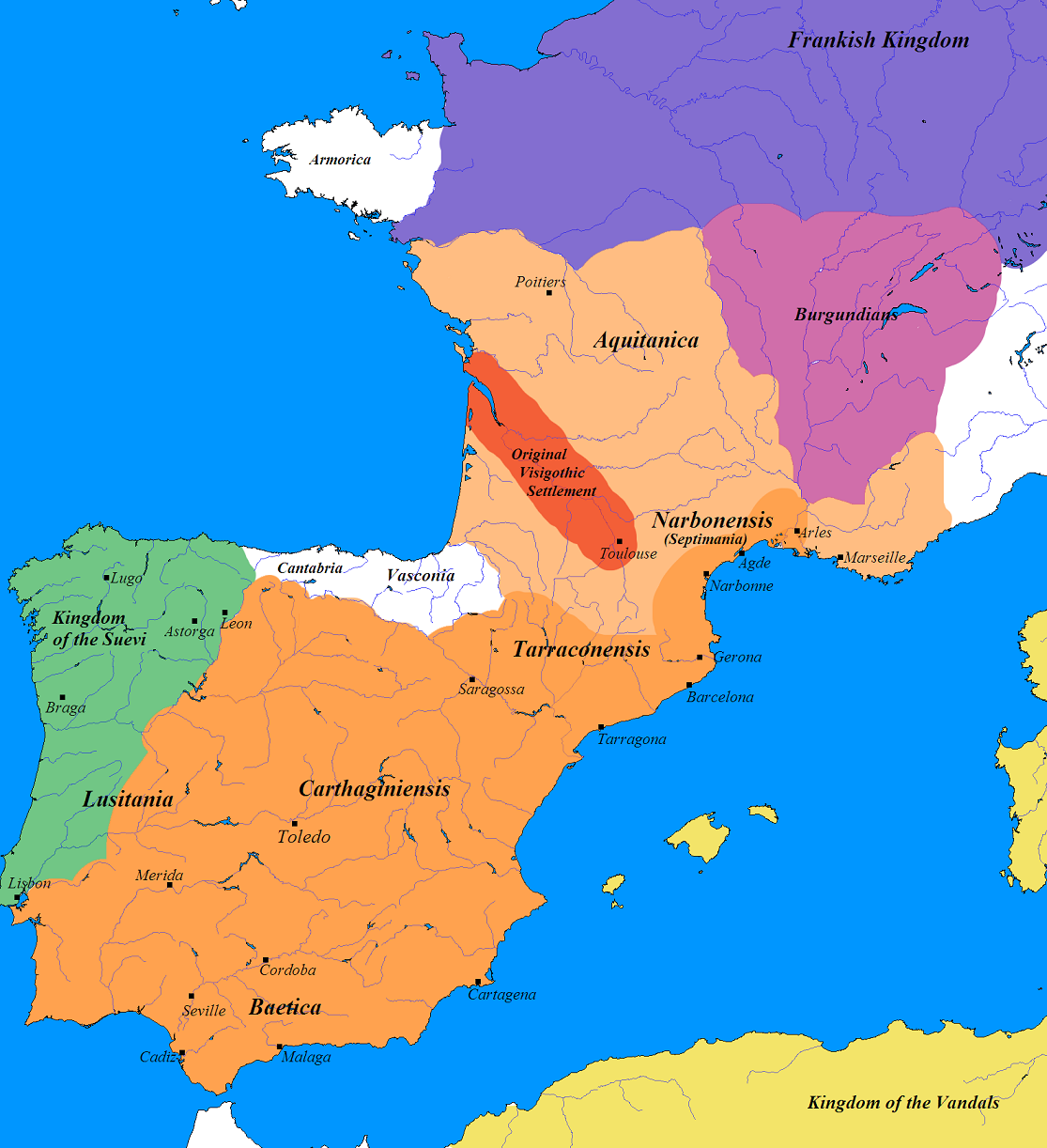
- Extent of the Visigothic Kingdom, c. 500 (total extent shown in orange, territory lost after Battle of Vouillé (507) shown in light orange: Kingdom of the Suebi was annexed in 585).
- Status: Foederati (until 475); Sovereign state (475–721)
- Capital: Toulouse (418–507); Barcelona (507–542) (temporarily); Toledo (542–711)
- Official languages: Gothic, Medieval Latin
- Common languages: Gothic (spoken among elite); Vulgar Latin; Vasconic languages (spoken by several tribes throughout almost the entire Pyrenean and pre-Pyrenean region); Medieval Hebrew and Middle Aramaic (used as a liturgical language, during this period, among Jews); Alanic (spoken by the Alans of Aurelianum)
- Religion: Arian Christianity (Predominant among Visigoths until 589); Catholic Christianity (Predominant among the Hispano-Romans, Kingdom's official religion after 589)
- Government: Elective Monarchy
- King
  - 415–418: Wallia
  - 418–451: Theodoric I
  - 466–484: Euric
  - 484–507: Alaric II
  - 507–511: Gesalec
  - 511–526: Theodoric the Great
  - 569–586: Liuvigild
  - 586–601: Reccared
  - 612–621: Sisebut
  - 621–631: Swintila
  - 649–672: Recceswinth
  - 694–710: Wittiza
  - 710–711: Roderic
  - 714–721: Ardo
- Historical era: Late Antiquity; Early Middle Ages
  - Sack of Rome: 410
  - Established: 418
  - Battle of the Catalaunian Plains: 451
  - Battle of Vouillé: 507
  - Annexation of the Suebic Kingdom: 585
  - Conquest of Byzantine Spania: 624
  - Battle of Guadalete and Umayyad conquest of Toledo: 711
  - Umayyad occupation of Septimania: 721

Area
- 484: 500,000 km^{2} (190,000 sq mi)
- 580: 600,000 km^{2} (230,000 sq mi)
Preceded by
Western Roman Empire
Kingdom of the Suebi
Hispania
Succeeded by
Umayyad Caliphate
Kingdom of Asturias
Francia
- Today part of: Portugal; Spain; Andorra; France

The Visigothic Kingdom, Visigothic Spain or Kingdom of the Goths (Latin: Regnum Gothorum) was a barbarian kingdom that occupied what is now southwestern France and the Iberian Peninsula from the 5th to the 8th century. One of the Germanic successor states to the Western Roman Empire, it was originally created by the settlement of the Visigoths under King Wallia in the province of Gallia Aquitania in southwest Gaul by the Roman government and then extended by conquest over all of Hispania. The Kingdom maintained independence from the Eastern Roman or Byzantine Empire, whose attempts to re-establish Roman authority in Hispania were only partially successful and short-lived.

The Visigoths were romanized central Europeans who had moved west from the Danube Valley. They became foederati of Rome, and sought to restore the Roman order against the hordes of Vandals, Alans and Suebi. The Western Roman Empire fell in 476 AD; therefore, the Visigoths believed they had the right to take the territories that Rome had promised in Hispania in exchange for restoring the Roman order. Under King Euric—who eliminated the status of foederati—a triumphal advance of the Visigoths began. Alarmed at Visigoth expansion from Aquitania after victory over the Gallo-Roman and Breton armies at Déols in 469, Western Emperor Anthemius sent a fresh army across the Alps against Euric, who was besieging Arles. The Roman army was crushed at the nearby Battle of Arles, resulting in Euric capturing Arles, securing much of southern Gaul.

Sometimes referred to as the Regnum Tolosae or Kingdom of Toulouse after its capital Toulouse in modern historiography, the Visigothic kingdom lost much of its territory in Gaul to the Franks in the early 6th century, except the narrow coastal strip of Septimania. The kingdom of the 6th and 7th centuries is sometimes called the Regnum Toletanum or Kingdom of Toledo after the new capital of Toledo in Hispania. A civil war starting in 549 resulted in an invitation from the Visigoth Athanagild, who had usurped the kingship, to the Byzantine emperor Justinian I to send soldiers to his assistance. Athanagild won the war, but the Byzantines took over Cartagena and a good deal of southern Hispania, until 624 when Swinthila expelled the last Byzantine garrisons from the peninsula, occupying Orcelis, which the Visigoths called Aurariola, what is today Orihuela in the Province of Alicante. Starting in the 570s Athanagild's brother Liuvigild compensated for this loss by conquering the Kingdom of the Suebi in Gallaecia, which corresponds roughly to present-day Galicia and the northern part of Portugal, and annexing it, and by repeated campaigns against the Basques.

The ethnic distinction between the Hispano-Roman population and the Visigoths had largely disappeared by this time, with the Gothic language losing its last and probably already declining function as a church language when the Visigoths renounced Arianism in 589. This newfound unity found expression in increasingly severe persecution of outsiders, especially the Jews. The Visigothic Code, completed in 654, abolished the old tradition of having different laws for Hispano-Romans and for Visigoths. The 7th century saw many civil wars between factions of the aristocracy. Despite good records left by contemporary bishops, such as Isidore and Leander of Seville, it becomes increasingly difficult to distinguish Goths from Hispano-Romans, as the two became inextricably intertwined. Despite these civil wars, by 625 AD the Visigoths had succeeded in expelling the Byzantines from Hispania and had established a foothold at the port of Ceuta in Africa. Most of the Visigothic Kingdom was conquered by Umayyad troops from North Africa in 711 to 719, with only the northern reaches of Hispania remaining in Christian hands. The medieval Kingdom of Asturias in northern Spain reputedly began when a Visigothic nobleman called Pelagius was elected princeps and became the leader of the Astures and of the Visigoths who had taken refuge in the mountains.

The Visigoths and their early kings followed Arian Christianity. This led to conflict with the Church in Rome. After their conversion to Nicene Christianity, the Church exerted an enormous influence on secular affairs through the Councils of Toledo. The Visigoths also developed the highly influential legal code known in Western Europe as the Visigothic Code (Latin: Liber Iudiciorum), which would become the basis for Spanish law throughout the Middle Ages.

== History ==
=== Federate kingdom ===
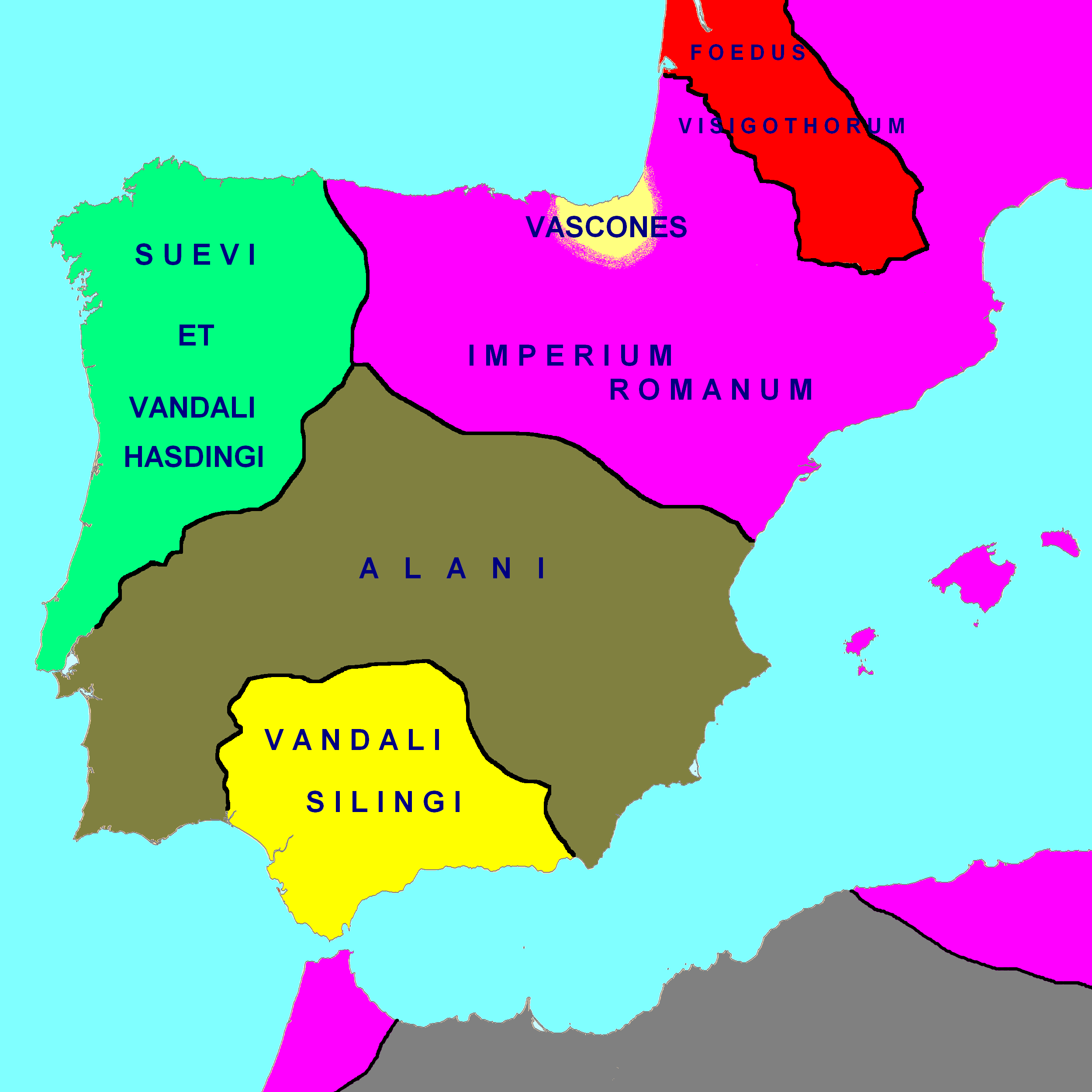
Visigothic settlement and the Iberian Peninsula, c. 418

From 407 to 409 AD, an alliance of (East) Germanic Vandals, Iranian Alans and (Elbe) Germanic Suebi crossed the frozen Rhine and swept across modern France and into the Iberian Peninsula. For their part, the Visigoths under Alaric famously sacked Rome in 410, capturing Galla Placidia, the sister of Western Roman emperor Honorius.

Athaulf (king of the Visigoths from 410 to 415) spent the next few years operating in the Gallic and Hispanic countrysides, diplomatically playing competing factions of Germanic and Roman commanders against one another to skillful effect, and taking over cities such as Narbonne and Toulouse (in 413). After he married Placidia, the Emperor Honorius enlisted him to provide Visigothic assistance in regaining nominal Roman control of Hispania from the Vandals, Alans and Suebi.

In 418, Honorius rewarded his Visigothic federates under King Wallia (reigned 415–418) by giving them land in the Garonne valley of Gallia Aquitania on which to settle. This probably took place under the system of hospitalitas. It seems likely that at first the Visigoths were not given a large amount of land estates in the region (as previously believed), but that they acquired the taxes of the region, with the local Gallic aristocrats now paying their taxes to the Visigoths instead of to the Roman government.

Theodoric I by Fabrizio Castello (1560–1617)

The Visigoths with their capital at Toulouse, remained de facto independent, and soon began expanding into Roman territory at the expense of the feeble Western empire. Under Theodoric I (418–451), the Visigoths attacked Arles (in 425 and 430) and Narbonne (in 436), but were checked by Litorius using Hunnic mercenaries. This resulted at first in Theodoric's defeat at the Battle of Narbonne in 436, but then in 439 at the Battle of Toulouse the Visigoths defeated the allied forces of Romans and Huns. By 451, the situation had reversed and the Huns had invaded Gaul; now Theodoric fought under Flavius Aetius against Attila the Hun in the Battle of the Catalaunian Plains. Attila was driven back, but Theodoric was killed in the battle.

The Vandals completed the conquest of North Africa when they took Carthage on October 19, 439, and the Suebi had taken most of Hispania. The Roman emperor Avitus now sent the Visigoths into Hispania. Theodoric II (453–466) invaded and defeated the king of the Suebi, Rechiarius, at the battle on the river Órbigo in 456 near Asturica Augusta (Astorga) and then sacked Bracara Augusta (Braga), the Suebi capital. The Goths sacked the cities in Gallaecia, part of the Suebi Kingdom quite brutally: they massacred a portion of the population and even attacked some holy places, probably due to the clergy's support of the Suebi. Theodoric took control over Hispania Baetica, Carthaginiensis and southern Lusitania. In 461, the Goths received the city of Narbonne from the emperor Libius Severus in exchange for their support. This led to a revolt by the army and by Gallo-Romans under Aegidius; as a result, Romans under Severus and the Visigoths fought other Roman troops, and the revolt ended only in 465.

=== Kingdom of Toulouse ===
The Iberian peninsula around 476

In 466, Euric, who was the youngest son of Theodoric I, came to the Visigothic throne. He is infamous for murdering his elder brother Theodoric II who had himself become king by murdering his elder brother Thorismund. Under Euric (466–484), the Visigoths began expanding in Gaul and consolidating their presence in the Iberian peninsula. Euric fought a series of wars with the Suebi, who retained some influence in Lusitania, and brought most of this region under Visigothic power, taking Emerita Augusta (Mérida) in 469. Euric also attacked the Western Roman Empire, capturing Hispania Tarraconensis in 472, the last bastion of (Western) Roman rule in Spain. By 476, he had extended his rule to the Rhone and the Loire rivers which comprised most of southern Gaul. He also occupied the key Roman cities of Arles and Marseille. In his campaigns, Euric had counted on a portion of the Gallo-Roman and Hispano-Roman aristocracy who served under him as generals and governors. The Visigothic Kingdom was formally recognized as an independent kingdom in former Roman territory instead of having the status of foederati when the Western emperor Julius Nepos (474–475) signed in 475 an alliance with Euric, granting him the lands south of the Loire and west of the Rhone in exchange for military service and the lands in Provence (including Arles and Marseille). The lands in Hispania remained under de facto Visigothic control. After Odoacer deposed the last Roman emperor in the West, Romulus Augustulus, Euric quickly recaptured Provence, a fact which Odoacer formally accepted in a treaty.

By 500, the Visigothic Kingdom, centered at Toulouse, controlled Gallia Aquitania and Gallia Narbonensis and most of Hispania with the exception of the Suebic Kingdom of Galicia in the northwest and small areas controlled by independent Iberian peoples, such as the Basques and the Cantabrians. Euric's son Alaric II (484–507) issued a new body of laws, the Breviarium Alarici, and held a church council at Agde.

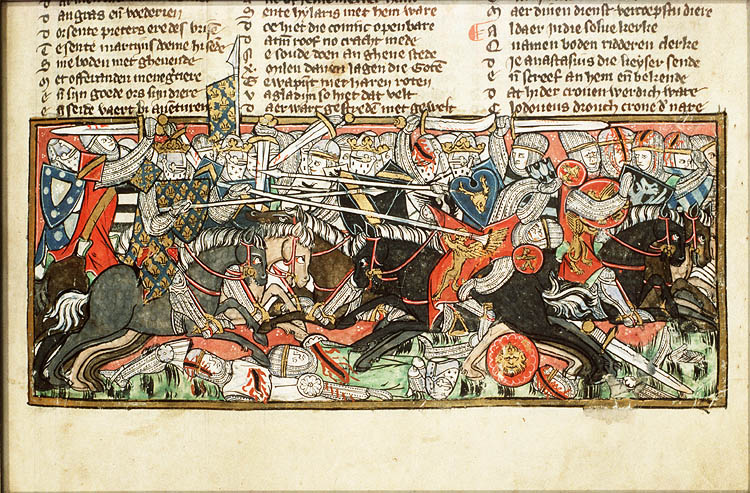
Clovis I fights the Visigoths

The Visigoths now came into conflict with the Franks under their King Clovis I, who had conquered northern Gaul. Following a brief war with the Franks, Alaric was forced to put down a rebellion in Tarraconensis, probably caused by recent Visigoth immigration to Hispania due to pressure from the Franks. In 507, the Franks attacked again, this time allied with the Burgundians. Alaric II was killed at the Battle of Campus Vogladensis (Vouillé) near Poitiers, and Toulouse was sacked. By 508, the Visigoths had lost most of their Gallic holdings save Septimania in the south.

=== Arian Kingdom of Hispania ===
After Alaric II's death, his illegitimate son Gesalec took power until he was deposed by Theodoric the Great, ruler of the Ostrogothic Kingdom, who invaded and defeated him at Barcelona. Gesalec fled and regrouped, but was defeated again at Barcelona, and was captured and killed. Theodoric then installed his grandson Amalaric (511–531), the son of Alaric II, as king. Amalaric, however, was still a child and power in Spain remained under the Ostrogothic general and regent, Theudis. Only after Theodoric's death (526) did Amalaric obtain control of his kingdom. His rule did not last long, as in 531, Amalaric was defeated by the Frankish king Childebert I and then murdered at Barcelona.

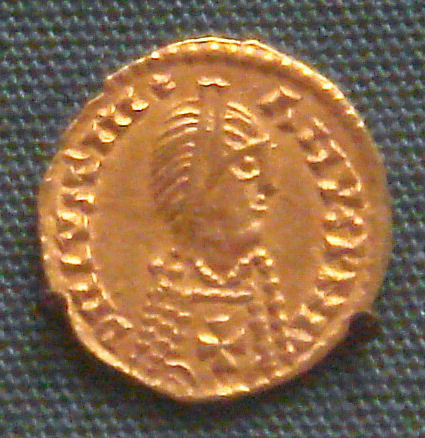
Visigothic pseudo-imperial gold tremissis in the name of Emperor Justinian I, 6th century: the Christian cross on the breast defines the Visigothic attribution. (British Museum)

Afterwards, Theudis (531–548) became king. He expanded Visigothic control over the southern regions, but he was also murdered after a failed invasion of Africa. Visigothic Spain suffered a civil war under King Agila I (549–554), which prompted the Roman/Byzantine emperor Justinian I to send an army and carve out the small province of Spania for the Byzantine Empire along the coast of southern Spain. Agila was eventually killed, and his enemy Athanagild (552–568) became the new king. He attacked the Byzantines, but he was unable to dislodge them from southern Spain and was obliged to formally acknowledge the suzerainty of the Empire.

Visigothic Hispania and the Byzantine province of Spania, circa 560 AD

The next Visigothic king was Liuvigild (569 – April 21, 586). He was an effective military leader and consolidated Visigothic power in Spain. Liuvigild campaigned against the Eastern Romans in the south in the 570s and he took back Cordova after another revolt. He also fought in the north against the Galician Kingdom of the Suebi and various small independent states, including the Basques and the Cantabrians. He pacified northern Spain but was unable to completely conquer these peoples. When Liuvigild established his son Hermenegild as joint ruler, a civil war ensued between them. Hermenegild became the first Visigothic king to convert to Nicene Christianity due to his ties with the Romans, but he was defeated in 584 and killed in 585. By the end of his reign, Liuvigild had united the entire Iberian peninsula, including the Suebic Kingdom which he conquered in 585 during a Suebi civil war that ensued after the death of King Miro. Liuvigild established amicable terms with the Franks through royal marriages, and they remained at peace throughout most of his reign. Liuvigild also founded new cities, such as Reccopolis and Victoriacum (Vitoria), the first barbarian king to do so.

=== Catholic Kingdom of Toledo ===
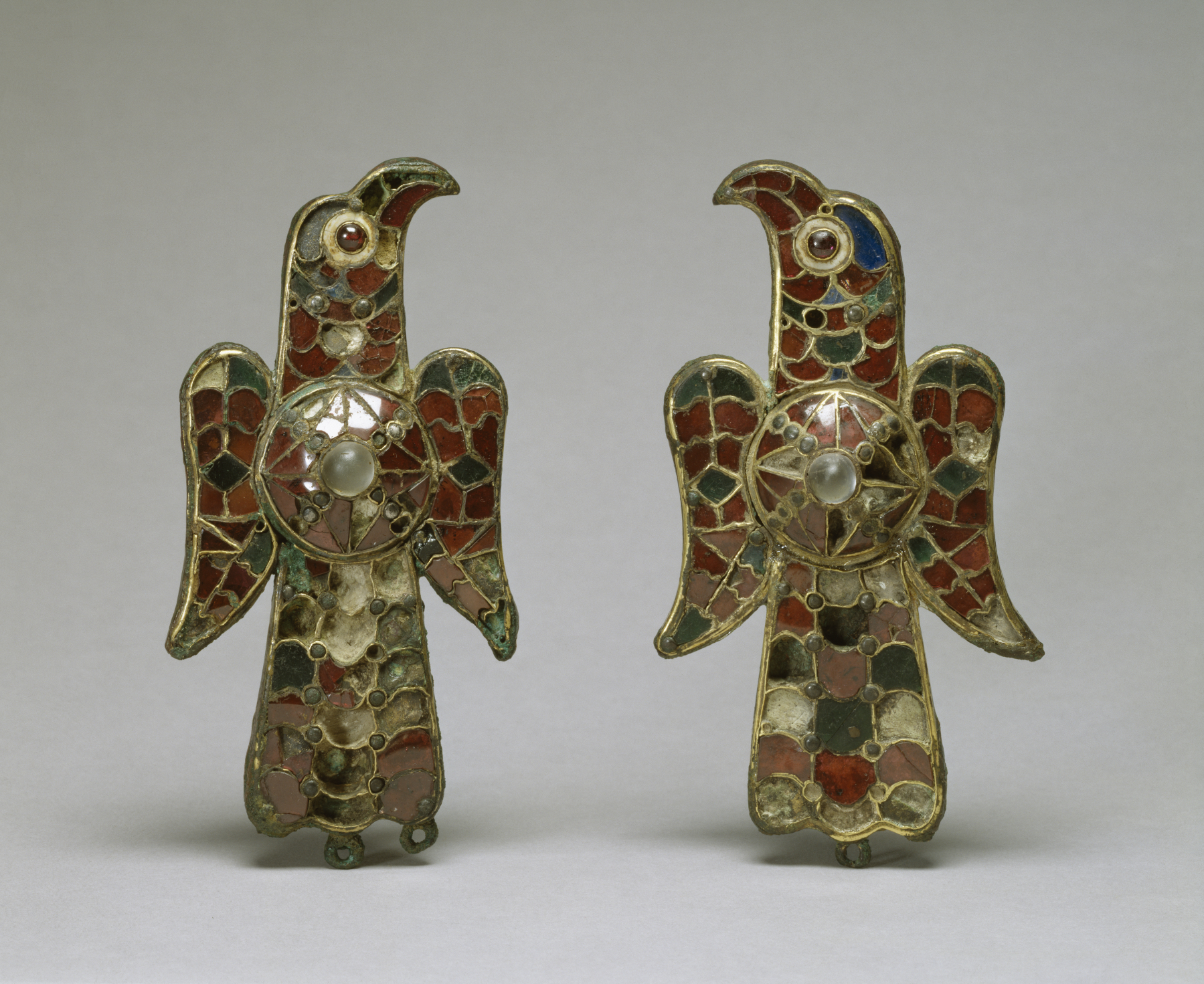
Visigothic pair of eagles on fibulae (brooches for fastening garments), Spain

On becoming King, Liuvigild's son Reccared I (586–601) converted from Arian to Chalcedonian Christianity. This led to some unrest in the kingdom, notably a revolt by the Arian bishop of Mérida which was put down; he also beat back another Frankish offensive in the north. Reccared then oversaw the Third Council of Toledo in 589, where he announced his faith in the Nicene creed and denounced Arianism. He adopted the name Flavius, the family name of the Constantinian dynasty, and styled himself as the successor to the Roman emperors. Reccared also fought the Byzantines in Hispania Baetica after they had begun a new offensive.

Reccared's son Liuva II became king in 601 but was deposed by the Visigothic noble Witteric (603–610), ending the short-lived dynasty. There were various Visigothic Kings between 610 and 631, and this period saw constant regicide. This period also saw the definitive conquest of the Byzantine territories in the south. War continued in the north against the Basques and Asturians, as indeed it would continue for the rest of the Visigothic Kingdom's existence. These Kings also worked on religious legislature, especially King Sisebut (612–621), who passed several harsh laws against Jews and forced many Jews to convert to Christianity. Sisebut was also successful against the Byzantines, taking several of their cities, including Málaga. The Byzantines were finally defeated by Swinthila (621–631), who had captured all of their Spanish holdings by 625. Suinthila was deposed by the Franks and replaced by Sisinand.

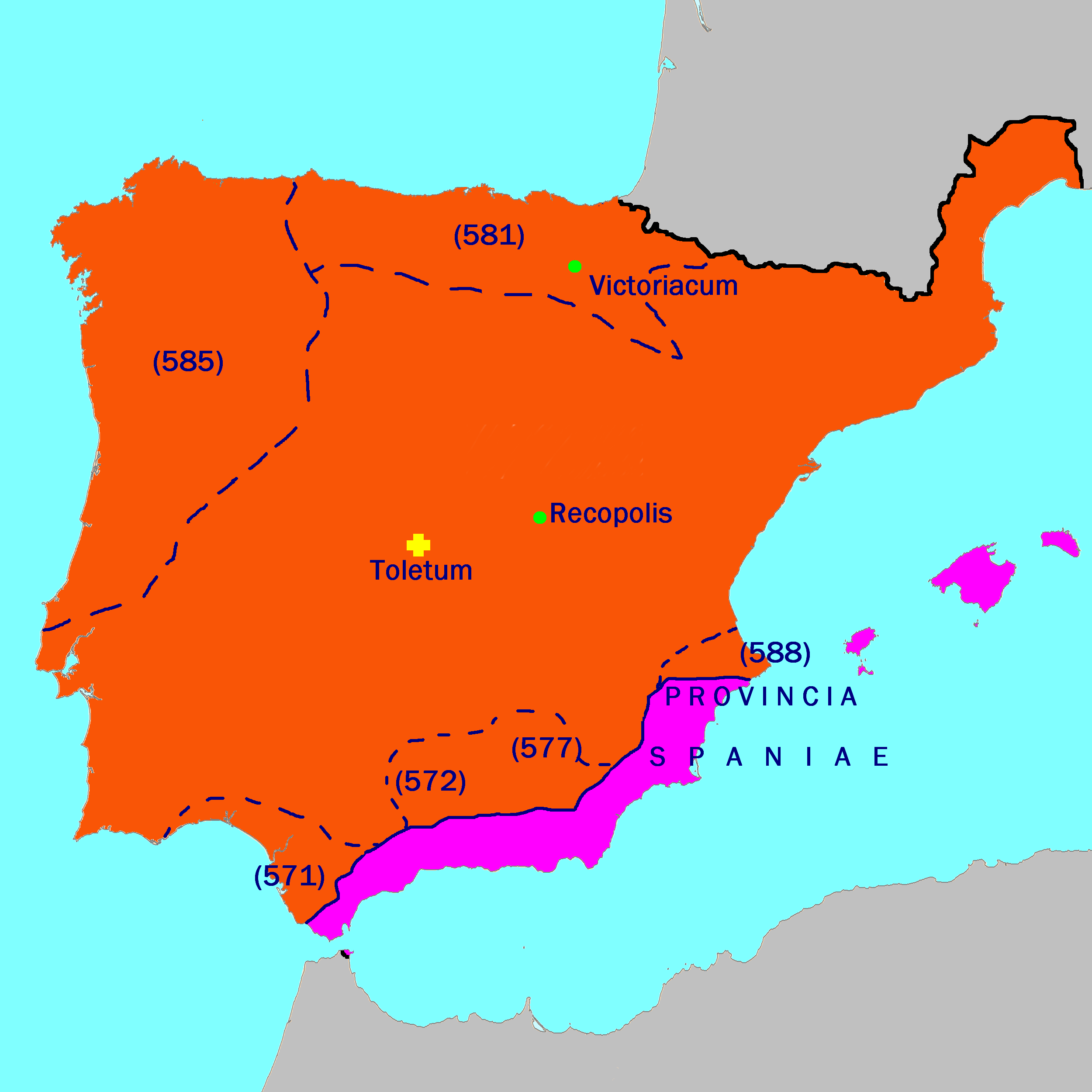
Map showing the conquests of Leovigild, c. 586

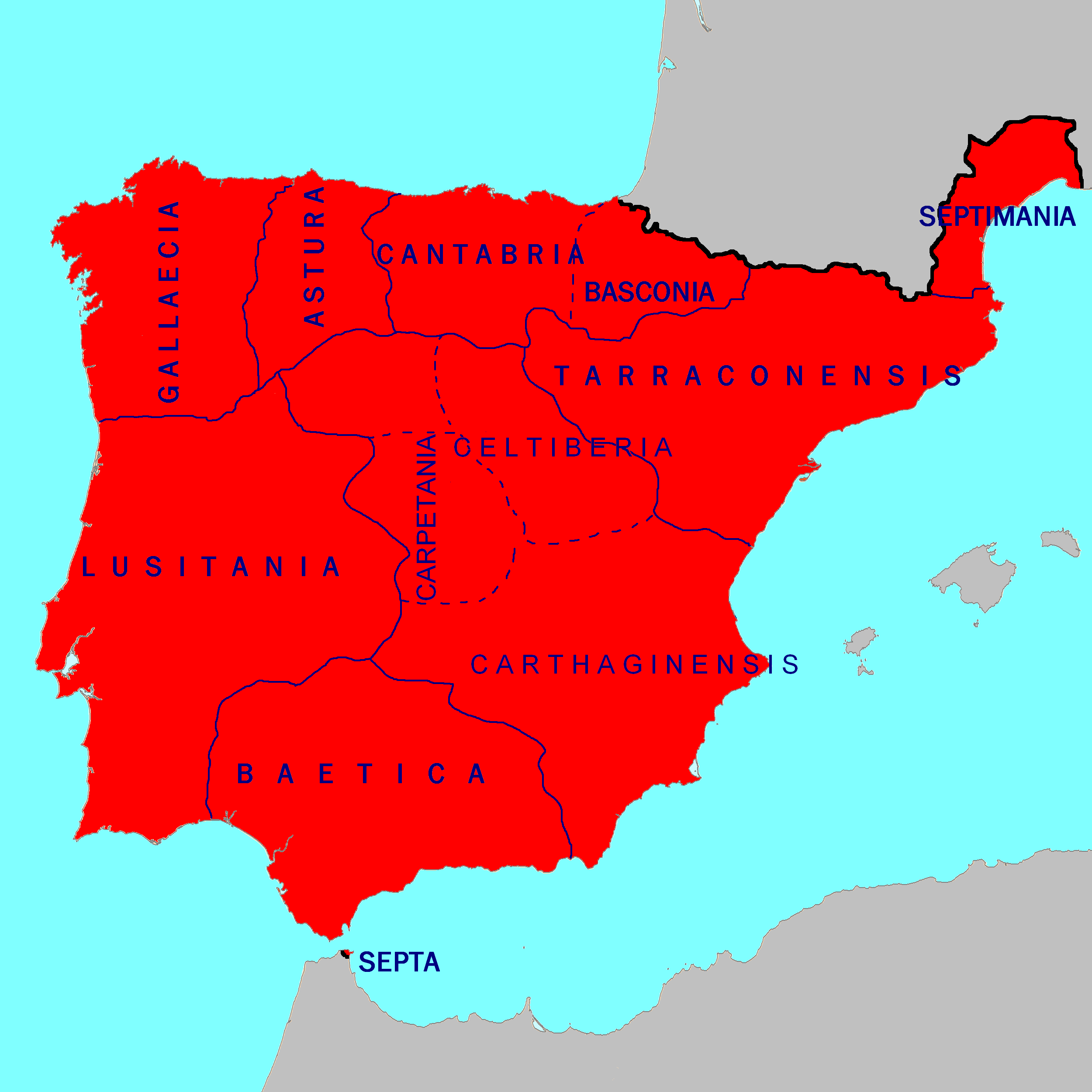
Visigothic Hispania and its regional divisions from 625 to 711, prior to the Muslim conquest

The instability of this period can be attributed to the power struggle between the kings and the nobility. Religious unification strengthened the political power of the church, which it exercised through church councils at Toledo along with the nobles. The fourth council, held during the brief reign of Sisinand in 633, excommunicated and exiled the king, replacing him with Chintila (636–639). The church councils were now the most powerful institution in the Visigothic state; they took the role of regulating the process of succession to the kingship by election of the king by Gothic noble 'senators' and the church officials. They also decided to meet on a regular basis to discuss ecclesiastical and political matters affecting the Church. Finally, they decided the kings should die in peace, and declared their persons sacred, seeking to end the violence and regicides of the past. Despite all this, another coup took place and Chintila was deposed in 639, and King Tulga took his place; he was also deposed in the third year of his reign and the council elected the noble Chindaswinth as king.

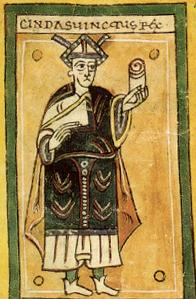
King Chindaswinth from the Códex Albedense.

The reigns of Chindaswinth and his son Recceswinth saw the compilation of the most important Visigothic law book, the Liber Iudiciorum (Spanish: Fuero Juzgo, English: Book of Judgements), also called Lex Visigothorum or the Visigothic Code promulgated by king Chindaswinth (642–653 AD) and completed in 654 by his son, king Recceswinth (649–672), abolished the old tradition of having different laws for Hispano-Romans and Visigoths. The new laws applied to both Gothic and Hispano-Roman populations who had been under different laws in the past, and it replaced all older codes of law. The code included old laws by past kings, such as Alaric II in his Breviarium Alarici, and Leovigild, but many were also new laws. The code was based almost wholly on Roman law, with some influence of Germanic law in rare cases. Among the eliminated old laws were the harsh laws against Jews. The Liber showed the old system of military and civil divisions in administration was changing, and dukes (duces provinciae) and counts (comites civitatis) had begun taking more responsibilities outside their original military and civil duties. The servants or slaves of the king became very prominent in the bureaucracy and exercised wide administrative powers. With the Visigoth law codes, women could inherit land and title and manage it independently from their husbands or male relations, dispose of their property in legal wills if they had no heirs, and could represent themselves and bear witness in court by age 14 and arrange for their own marriages by age 20. Chindaswinth (642–653) strengthened the monarchy at the expense of the nobility; he executed some 700 nobles, forced dignitaries to swear oaths, and in the seventh council of Toledo laid down his right to excommunicate clergy who acted against the government. He was also able to maneuver his son Recceswinth on the throne, sparking a rebellion by a Gothic noble who allied with the Basques, but was put down. Recceswinth (653–672) held another council of Toledo, which reduced sentences for treason and affirmed the power of the councils to elect kings.

Following Recceswinth, King Wamba (672–680) was elected king. He had to deal with Flavius Paulus' revolts in Tarraconensis and Hilderic of Nimes, and because of this, he felt a need to reform the army. He passed a law declaring all dukes, counts and other military leaders, as well as bishops, had to come to the aid of the kingdom once danger became known or risk harsh punishment. Wamba was eventually deposed in a bloodless coup. King Ervig (680–687) held further church councils and repealed the previous harsh laws of Wamba, though he still made provisions for the army. Ervig had his son-in-law Egica made king. Despite a rebellion by the bishop of Toledo, the 16th council, held in 693, denounced the bishop's revolt. The 17th council in 694 passed harsh laws against the Jews, citing a conspiracy, and many were enslaved, especially those who had converted from Christianity. Egica also raised his son Wittiza as coruler in 698. Not much is known about his reign, but a period of civil war quickly ensued between his sons (Achila and Ardo) and King Roderic, who had seized Toledo.

=== Muslim conquest ===
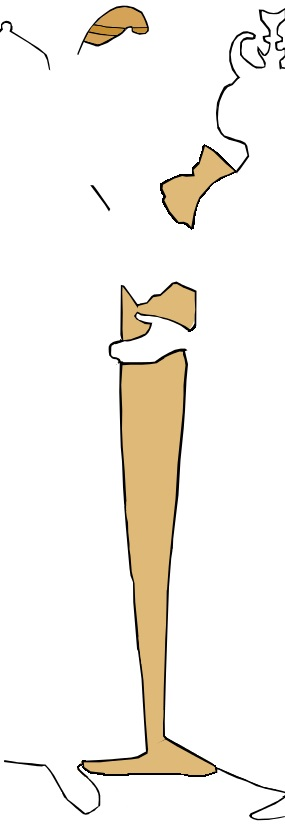
Copy of a mural from Qusayr Amra, depicting king Roderic

In 711, Tariq ibn Ziyad, a Muslim Berber client of Musa bin Nusair, the governor of Islamic Africa, invaded Spain with about 7,000 Berber men, while Roderic was in the north fighting the Basques. The tale that Julian, Count of Ceuta, facilitated the invasion because one of his daughters had been dishonored by Roderic is possibly mythical. By late July, a battle took place at the Guadalete River in the province of Cádiz. Roderic was betrayed by his troops, who sided with his enemies, and the king was killed in battle. The Muslims then took much of southern Spain with little resistance and went on to capture Toledo, where they executed several Visigothic nobles. In 712, Musa, the governor of Ifriqiya, arrived with another army of 18,000, with large Arab contingents. He took Mérida in 713 and invaded the north, taking Zaragoza and León, which were still under King Ardo, in 714. After being recalled by the Caliph, Musa left his son Abd al-'Aziz in command. By 716, most of the Iberian Peninsula was under Islamic rule, with Septimania taken between 721 and 725. The only effective resistance was in Asturias, where a Visigothic nobleman named Pelagius revolted in 718, and defeated the Muslims at the battle of Covadonga; this was the beginning of the Reconquista.

According to Joseph F. O'Callaghan, the remnants of the Hispano-Gothic aristocracy still played an important role in the society of Hispania. At the end of Visigothic rule, the assimilation of Hispano-Romans and Visigoths was occurring at a fast pace. Their nobility had begun to think of themselves as constituting one people, the gens Gothorum or the Hispani. An unknown number of them fled and took refuge in Asturias or Septimania. In Asturias, they supported Pelagius's uprising, and joining with the indigenous leaders, formed a new aristocracy. The population of the mountain region consisted of native Astures, Galicians, Cantabri, Basques and other groups unassimilated into Hispano-Gothic society.

Resistance also continued in the regions around the Pyrenees with the establishment of the Marca Hispanica from 760 to 785 by the Frankish Empire. The Berbers settled in the south and the Meseta Central in Castile. Initially, the Muslims generally left the Christians alone to practise their religion, although non-Muslims were subject to Islamic law and treated as second-class citizens.

== Settlements ==
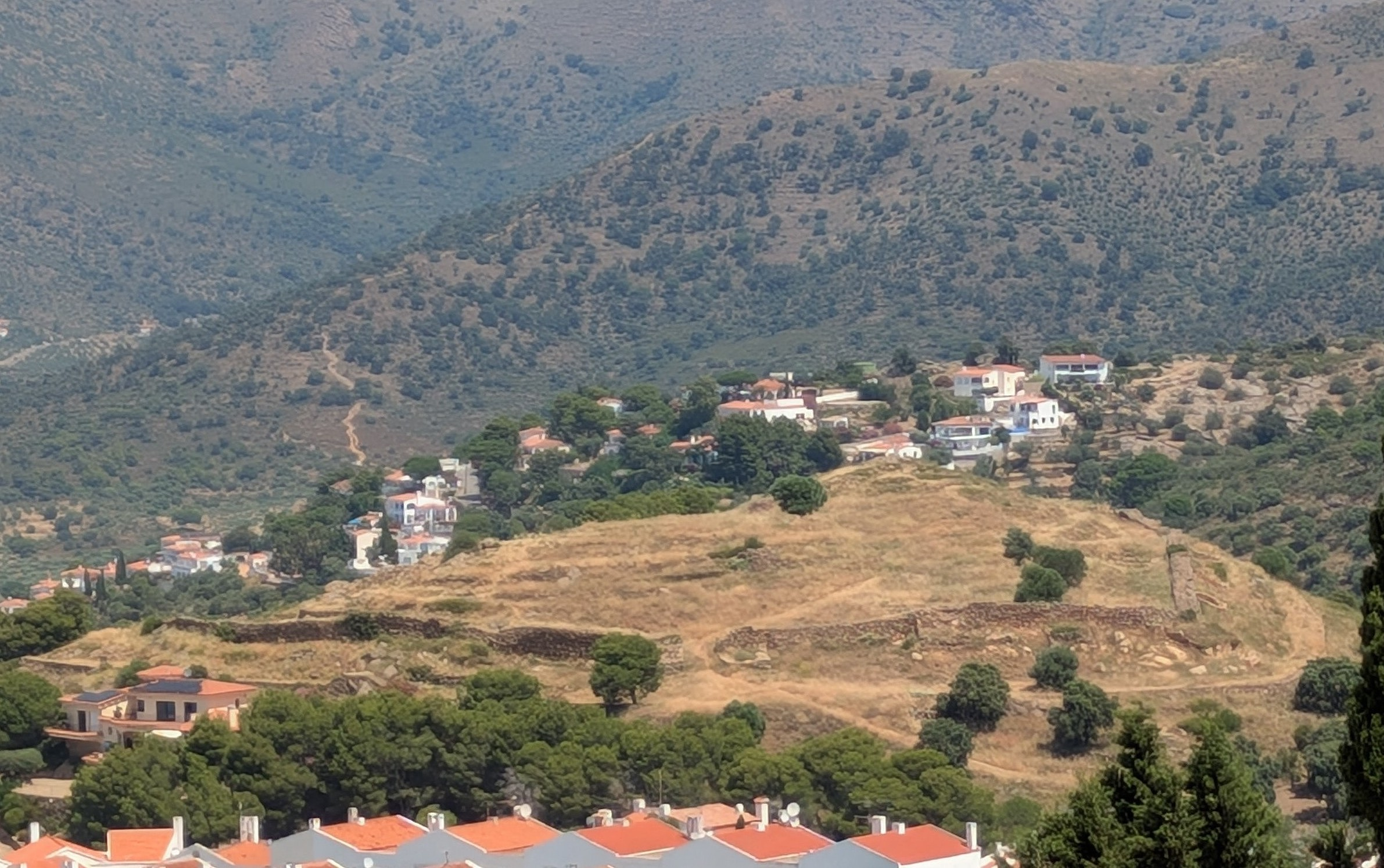
The Visigothic fortified settlement at Roses, Catalonia. Occupied during parts of the seventh and eighth centuries, it is regarded as "one of the few and best preserved Visigothic period enclosures in the entire Iberian Peninsula".

Visigothic settlements were concentrated along the Garonne River between Bordeaux and Toulouse in Aquitaine during the 5th century, according to contemporary sources under the terms of the late Roman Empire as foederatii, or allies, and assigned billeting obligations to provide lodging for Roman soldiers, more or less as the imperial military had done in other provinces.

Later in the century, following annexations made by King Euric in Gaul and Hispania once the Roman Empire of the West had collapsed, specially after the Battle of Vouille, many Goths and their federated peoples, such as the Vandals, Ostrogoths and Sarmatians, moved to settle more freely under their kindred clans' rulers, the reiks, who received dukedom territories or comital offices as counts over smaller territories or key urban locations within the provinces of Hispania and in southwestern Gaul and its Mediterranean coast. Their settlements were made around the Roman cities of Emerita Augusta (Mérida), Barcino (Barcelona), Hispalis (Seville), Toletum (Toledo) and Septimanian Narbonne, which would be the main bases of Gothic power politically as well as militarily during the rest of the kingdom's history, as well as other settlements that were dispersed in rural farming areas between the upper reaches of the Douro, Ebro and Tagus rivers, in an area between Tierra de Campos, also known as Campi Gothorum, around Central Castile and León and Rioja, and Toledo to the east and south. After the fall of the Galician Kingdom of the Suebi, some further settlements were made along the Tagus river north of Lisbon, by Porto and Astorga former strongholds of the Suebi. Little Visigothic settlement occurred elsewhere in the kingdom.

== Founding of cities ==
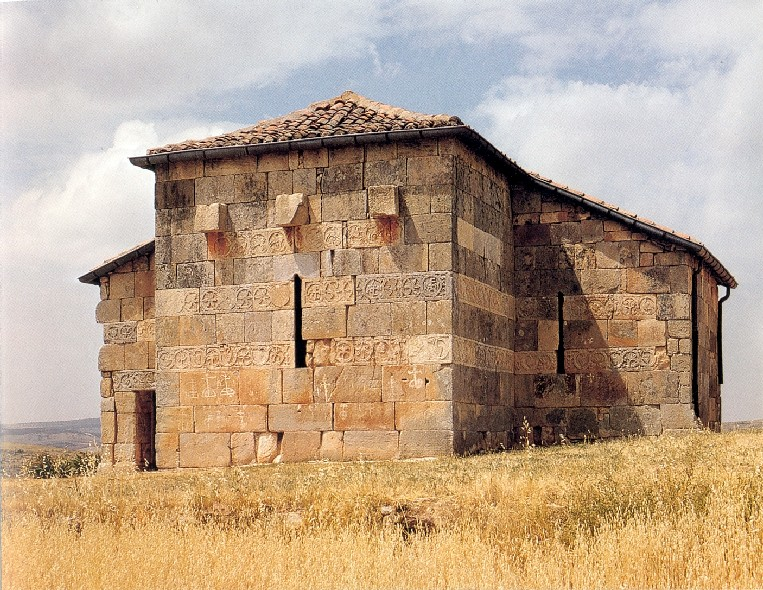
Church of Santa Maria de Lara, most likely built just before the Muslim invasion

The Visigoths founded the only new cities in Western Europe between the fifth and eighth centuries. It is certain (through contemporary Spanish accounts) that they founded four, and a possible fifth city is ascribed to them by a later Arabic source. All of these cities were founded for military purposes and three of them in celebration of victory.

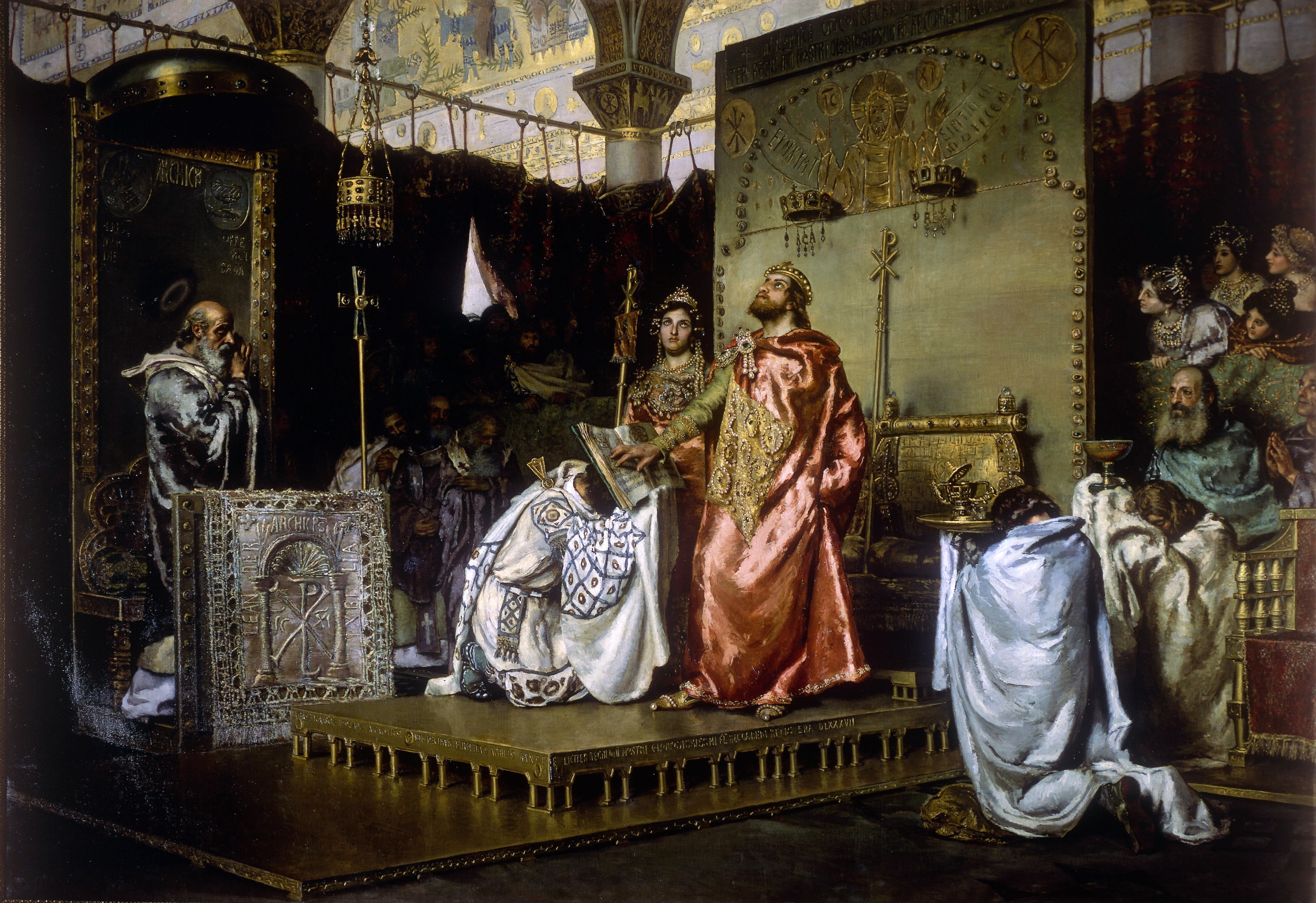
Conversion of Reccared to Chalcedonian Christianity, painted by Muñoz Degrain. Senate Palace Spain.

The first, Reccopolis, was founded by Liuvigild in 578 after his victory over the Franks, near what is today the tiny village of Zorita de los Canes. He named it after his son Reccared and built it with Byzantine imitations, containing a palace complex and mint, but it lay in ruins by the 9th century (after the Arab conquest).

At a slightly later date, Liuvigild founded a city he named Victoriacum after his victory over the Basques. Though it is often supposed to survive as the city of Vitoria, contemporary 12th-century sources refer to the latter city's foundation by Sancho VI of Navarre.

Liuvigild's son and namesake of the first Visigothic city founded his own sometime around 600. It is referred to by Isidore of Seville as Lugo id est Luceo in the Asturias, built after a victory over the Asturians or Cantabri.

The fourth and possibly final city of the Goths was Ologicus (perhaps Ologitis), founded using Basque labour in 621 by Swinthila as a fortification against the recently subjected Basques. It is to be identified with modern Olite.

The possible fifth Visigothic foundation is Baiyara (perhaps modern Montoro), mentioned as founded by Reccared in the Geography of Kitab al-Rawd al-Mitar.

== Culture and classical heritage ==
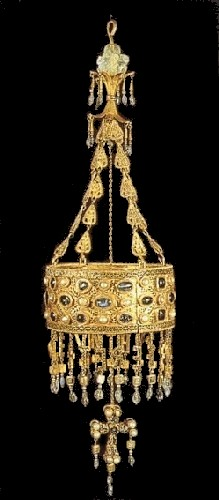
Elaborate votive crown of king Recceswinth, part of the Treasure of Guarrazar. Spain

The Visigothic rule has often been misattributed to be a part of the so-called Dark Ages, a time of supposedly cultural and scientific decay. Through the course of their existence the Visigoths supposedly remained "men of the woods never strayed too far from there," as Thomas F. Glick puts it.

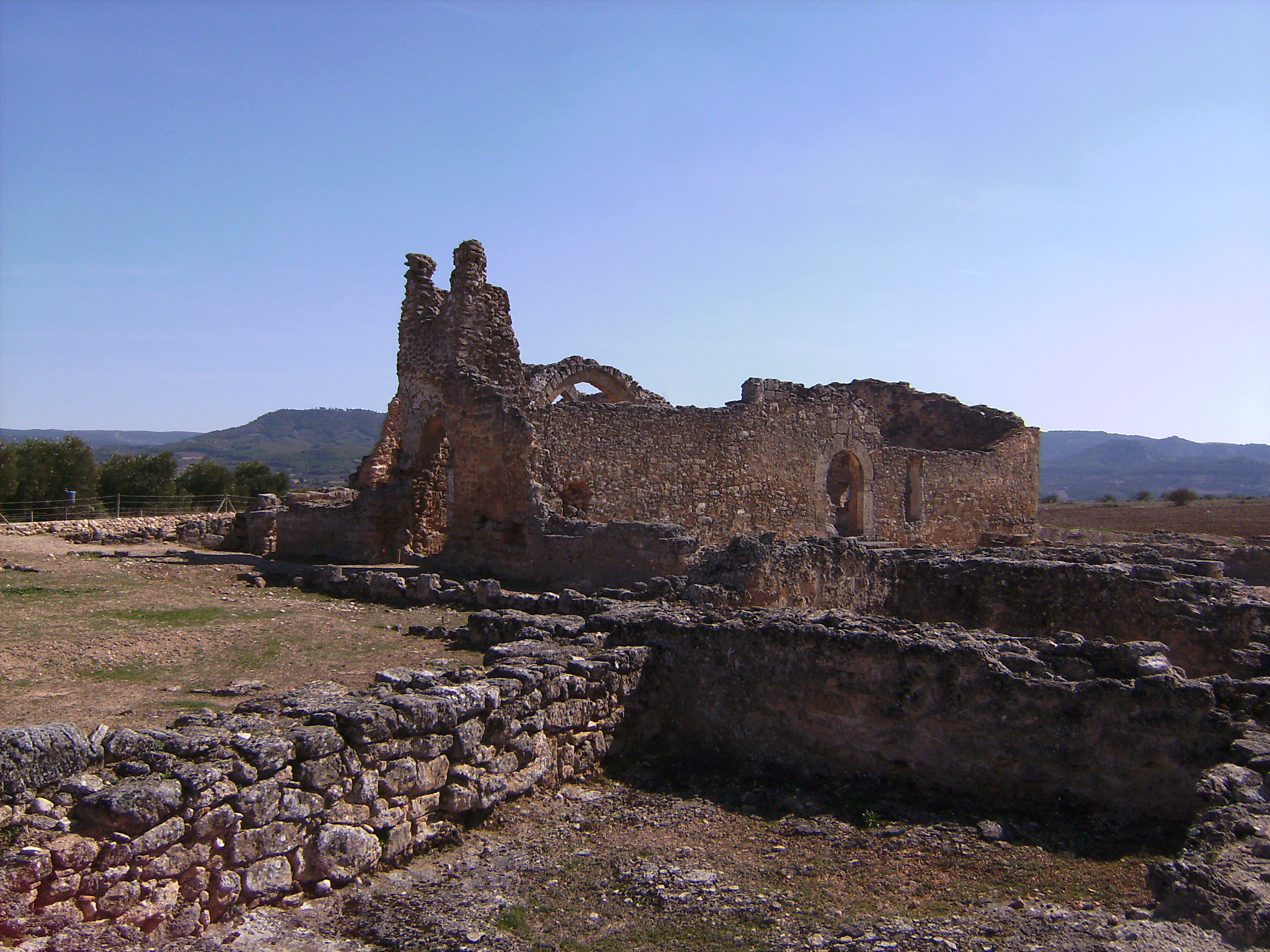
Remains of the basilica of Reccopolis. Spain

However, in fact, the Visigoths were preservers of the classical culture. The bathing culture of Andalusia, for example, often said to be a Muslim invention, is a direct continuation of Romano-Visigothic traditions. Visigothic Mérida housed baths supplied with water by aqueducts, and such aqueducts are also attested in Córdoba, Cádiz and Recopolis. Excavations confirm that Recopolis and Toledo, the Visigothic capital, were heavily influenced by the contemporary Byzantine architecture. When the Muslims looted Spain during their conquest they were amazed by the fine and innumerable Visigothic treasures. A few of these treasures were preserved as they were buried during the Muslim invasions – e.g., the votive crowns from the treasure of Guarrazar.

Only the senior monks were allowed to read books of non-Christian or heretic authors. This did not stop the rise of intellectuals such as Isidore of Seville, one of the most quoted scholars of the Middle Ages. He was known for the breadth of his literary output, highlighted by his Etymologies, an encyclopedia of the knowledge of the epoch that was known and translated throughout medieval Europe. Eugenius I of Toledo was both theologian and poet, expert in mathematics and astronomy; Theodulf of Orléans, theologian and poet, after he had fled to the Frankish kingdom, participated in the Carolingian Renaissance. A Muslim source referred to Visigothic Seville as the "abode of the sciences". The Institutionum disciplinae from the mid seventh/early eight century confirms that Visigothic nobles were not only taught in reading and writing but also in science, medicine, law and philosophy. An example of a highly educated nobleman was king Sisebut, who was a patron of learning and writer of poems, one of them about astronomy.

== Jews under Visigothic rule ==
Natural migration brought most of the Iberian Peninsula under Visigothic rule by the early 5th century. Other than in their contempt for Catholics, who reminded them of the Romans, the Visigoths did not generally take much of an interest in the religious creeds within their kingdom. It was only in 506, when Alaric II (484–507) published his Breviarium Alaricianum in which he adopted the laws of the ousted Romans that a Visigothic king concerned himself with the Jews.

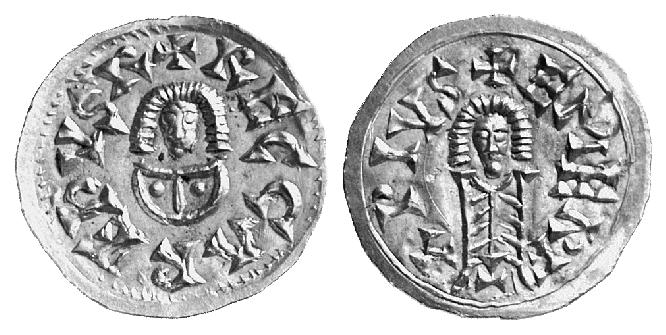
Visigothic coinage: King Recared

The tides turned even more dramatically following the conversion of the Visigothic royal family under Recared from Arianism to Catholicism in 587. In their desire to consolidate the realm under the new religion, the Visigoths adopted an aggressive policy concerning the Jews. As the king and the church acted in a single interest, the situation for the Jews deteriorated. At the Toledo III Council in 589, bishops endorsed the Breviary's restrictions on Jews, including prohibitions on intermarriage with Christians, owning Christian slaves, and holding public office.

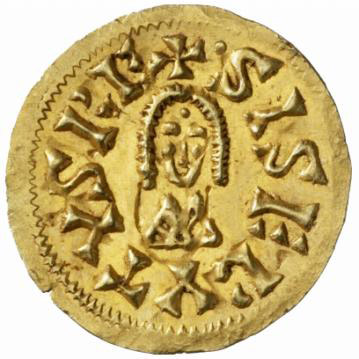
Visigothic coinage: Sisebut

While the policies of the subsequent Kings Liuva II (601–604), Witteric (603–610), and Gundemar (610–612) are unknown, Sisebut (612–620) embarked on Recared's course with renewed vigour. Sisebut instituted what was to become a recurring phenomenon in European Christian kingdoms, the first edicts requiring the mass conversion of all Jews to Christianity. After his 613 decree that Jews must either convert or be expelled, some fled to Gaul or North Africa, while as many as 90,000 converted. Many of the conversos, like those of later periods, maintained their Jewish identities in secret. During the more tolerant reign of Suintila (621–631), most of the conversos returned to Judaism, and a number of the exiles returned to Spain.

In 633, the Fourth Council of Toledo, while taking a stance in opposition to compulsory baptism, convened to address the problem of crypto-Judaism. The canons referred to forcibly converted Jews as "baptized Jews" or simply as "Jews," but never as "Christians". It was decided that if professed Christian were determined to be a practising Jew, their children were to be taken away to be raised in monasteries or trusted Christian households. The council further directed that all who had reverted to Judaism during the reign of Swintila had to return to Christianity. The trend toward intolerance continued with the ascent of Chintila (636–639). He directed the Sixth Council of Toledo to order that only Catholics could remain in the kingdom, and taking an unusual step further, he excommunicated "in advance" any of his successors who did not act in accordance with his anti-Jewish edicts. Again, many converted, but others chose exile.

However, the "problem" continued. The Eighth Council of Toledo in 653 again tackled the issue of Jews within the realm. Further measures at the time included the forbidding of all Jewish rites (including circumcision and the observation of the Shabbat), and all converted Jews had to promise to put to death, either by burning or by stoning, any of their brethren known to have relapsed to Judaism. The council was aware that prior efforts had been frustrated by lack of compliance among authorities on the local level; therefore, anyone, including nobles and clergy, found to have aided Jews in their practice of Judaism was to be punished by seizure of one quarter of their property and excommunication.

The efforts again proved unsuccessful. The Jewish population remained sufficiently sizable as to prompt Wamba (672–680) to issue limited expulsion orders against them, and the reign of Erwig (680–687) also seemed vexed by the issue. The Twelfth Council of Toledo again called for forced baptism and, for those who disobeyed, seizure of property, corporal punishment, exile, ll and slavery. Jewish children over seven years of age were taken from their parents and similarly dealt with in 694. Erwig also took measures to ensure that Catholic sympathisers would not be inclined to aid Jews in their efforts to subvert the council's rulings. Heavy fines awaited any nobles who acted in favour of the Jews, and members of the clergy who were remiss in enforcement were subject to a number of punishments.

Egica (687–702), recognising the wrongness of forced baptism, relaxed the pressure on the conversos but kept it up on practising Jews. Economic hardships included increased taxes and the forced sale, at a fixed price, of all property ever acquired from Christians. That effectively ended all agricultural activity for the Jews of Spain. Furthermore, Jews were not to engage in commerce with the Christians of the kingdom or to conduct business with Christians overseas. Egica's measures were upheld by the Sixteenth Council of Toledo in 693.

In 694, at the Council of Toledo, Jews were condemned to slavery by the Visigoths because of a plot to revolt against them encouraged by the Eastern Roman Empire and Romans still residing in Spain.

After the Visigoths elites adopted the Nicene creed, persecutions of Jews increased. The degree of complicity that the Jews had in the Islamic invasion in 711 is uncertain, but since they were openly treated as enemies in the country in which they had resided for generations, it would be no surprise for them to have appealed to the Moors to the south, who were quite tolerant in comparison to the Visigoths, for aid. In any case, the Jews in 694 were accused of conspiring with Muslims across the Mediterranean. Jews were declared traitors, including baptised Jews, found their property confiscated and themselves enslaved. The decree exempted only the converts who dwelt in the mountain passes of Septimania, who were necessary for the kingdom's protection.

The Eastern Roman Empire sent its navy on numerous occasions in the late 7th century and the early 8th century to try to instill uprisings in the Jewish and Christian Roman populations in Spain and Gaul against their Visigoth and Frankish rulers that was also aimed at halting the expansion of Muslim Arabs in the Roman world.

The Jews of Spain were utterly embittered and alienated by Catholic rule at the time of the Muslim invasion. The Moors were perceived as a liberating force and welcomed by Jews eager to help them to administer the country. In many conquered towns, the Muslims left the garrison in the hands of the Jews before they proceeded further north, which initiated the Golden Age of Spanish Jews.

== List of kings ==
=== Terving kings ===
These kings and leaders – with the exception of Fritigern and possibly Alavivus – were pagans.

- Ariaric
- Aoric
- Athanaric (369–381)
  - Rothesteus, sub-king
  - Winguric, sub-king
- Alavivus (c. 376), rebel against Valens
- Fritigern (c. 376–c. 380), rebel against Athanaric and Valens

=== Balti dynasty ===
These kings were Arians (followers of the theological teaching of Arius). They tended to succeed their fathers or close relatives on the throne and thus constitute a dynasty, the Balti.

- Alaric I (395–410)
- Athaulf (410–415)
- Sigeric (415)
- Wallia (415–418)
- Theodoric I (418–451)
- Thorismund (451–453)
- Theodoric II (453–466)
- Euric (466–484)
- Alaric II (484–507)
- Gesalec (507–511)
  - Theodoric the Great (511–526), regent
- Amalaric (511–531)

=== Post-Balti kings ===
The Visigothic monarchy took on a completely elective character with the fall of the Balti, but the monarchy remained Arian until Reccared I converted in 587 (Hermenegild had also converted earlier). Only a few sons succeeded their fathers to the throne in this period.

- Theudis (531–548)
- Theudigisel (548–549)
- Agila I (549–554)
- Athanagild (554–568)
- Liuva I (568–572), only ruled in Narbonensis from 569
- Liuvigild (569–586), ruled only south of the Pyrenees until 572
  - Hermenegild (580–585), sub-king in Baetica
- Reccared I (580–601), son, sub-king in Narbonensis until 586, first Catholic king
  - Segga (586–587), rebel
  - Argimund (589–590), rebel
- Liuva II (601–603), son
- Witteric (603–610)
- Gundemar (610–612)
- Sisebut (612–621)
- Reccared II (621), son
- Swinthila (621–631)
  - Reccimer (626–631), son and associate
- Sisenand (631–636)
  - Iudila (632–633), rebel
- Chintila (636–640)
- Tulga (640–641)
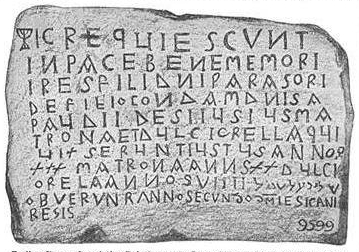
  Funerary stele from Narbonne at the 7th-century beginning of the reign of Egica. The text begins with the Latin phrase requiescunt in pace. In various sources it is described as a "Christian inscription", an "inscription relating to the Jews of France", or as a Jewish inscription dated with the local calendar—the regnal year of Egica—rather than the Hebrew calendar.
- Chindaswinth (641–653)
- Recceswinth (649–672), son, initially co-king
  - Froia (653), rebel
- Wamba (672–680)
  - Hilderic (672), rebel
  - Paul (672–673), rebel
- Erwig (680–687)
- Egica (687–702)
  - Suniefred (693), rebel
- Wittiza (694–710), son, initially co-king or sub-king in Gallaecia
- Roderic (710–711), only in Lusitania and Carthaginiensis
- Agila II (711–714), only in Tarraconensis and Narbonensis
  - Oppas (712), perhaps in opposition to Roderic and Agila II
- Ardo (714–721), only in Narbonensis

== Family tree ==
Kings of the Visigoths family tree

Rothesteus; Sub-king of the Visigoths	Theodosius I the Great; Roman Emperor; 347–379–395	? Athanaric ?–381
Atharid	Alaric I King of the Visigoths; 370/375–395–410	Unknown	Galla Placidia; 388–450	Ataulf; King of the Visigoths ≈370–410–415	Wallia; King of the Visigoths ≈385–415–418
Theodoric I King of the Visigoths ≈393–418–451	Unknown	Theodosius; 414–415	Rechila; Suevic; King of Galicia ?–438–448	Unknown
Thorismund; King of the Visigoths ≈420–451–453	Theodoric II; King of the Visigoths ≈426–453–466	Frederic ?–466	Euric; King of the Visigoths; 415–466–484	Ragnachildis	Retimer	Himnerith	Theodoric the Great; K. of Ostrogoths; 454–475–526; Regent r.511–526
Remismund; King of the Suevi ?–464–469	Unknown	Odoacer; King of Italy; 433–476–493	Evochilde; 446–?	Alaric II; King of the Visigoths ≈458/466–484–507	Theodegotha; 476?–524	Clovis I King of the Franks; 466–509–511–511
Gesalec; King of the Visigoths ?–507–511–513	Amalaric; King of the Visigoths; 502–511–531	Clotilde ≈500–531	Eustere; 494?–521	Theuderic I King of Metz; 485–511–533/4	Chlothar I King of the Franks; 497–558–561
Liuva I King of the Visigoths ?-568–571/2	Theodosia	Liuvigild; King of the Visigoths ≈519–568–586	Goiswintha	Athanagild; King of the Visigoths ≈517–554–567
Galswintha; 540–568	Chilperic I King of Neustria c.539–561–584	Brunhilda of Austrasia c.543–613	Sigebert I King of Austrasia c.535–561–c.575
Baddo	Reccared I King of the Visigoths; 559–586–601	Chlodosind; 569-?	Hermenegild ?–585	Ingund; 568/567–585	Merovech
Liuva II; King of the Visigoths; 584–601–603	Unknown	Sisebut; King of the Visigoths; 565–612–621	Atanagildo ≈583–?	Witteric; King of the Visigoths ≈565–603–610
Reccared II; King of the Visigoths ?–621	Theodora ≈590–?	Suintila; King of the Visigoths ≈588–621– 631–633/635	Geila	Ermenberga ≈590–?	Theuderic II; King of Burgundy; 587–595–613
Chintila; King of the Visigoths ≈606–636–640	Sisenand; King of the Visigoths; 605–631–636	Ricimer ≈610–631	Chindasuinth; King of the Visigoths; 563–641–653	Recciberga
?	?
Tulga; King of the Visigoths ?-640–641–?	Recceswinth; King of the Visigoths ?–649–672	Theodofred; Duke of Cordoba	Favila; Duke of Cantabria ≈684–701	Gada	Ardabasto
?	?	?
? Giscila	Ariberga	Wamba; King of the Visigoths ≈643–672– 680–687/688	Roderic; King of the Visigoths ?–710–712	Pelagius; King of Asturias; 685–718–737	Erwig; King of the Visigoths aft.642–680–687	Liuvigoto; 620–?
Kings of the Kingdom of Asturias	?
Egica; King of the Visigoths; 610–687–701/703	Cixilo	Peter; Duke of Cantabria ?–730
Wittiza; King of the Visigoths ≈687–694–710?	Oppas; Bishop of Seville ?–712	Sisebuto	Alfonso I King of Asturias ≈693–739–757	Fruela of Cantabria ?–758
? Achila II; King of the Visigoths ?–711–714?	Kings of the Kingdom of Asturias	Kings of the Kingdom of Asturias

== See also ==
- Spanish surnames of Goth origin
- Romano-Germanic culture
- For evidence of Visigothic taxation, see De fisco Barcinonensi
- Councils of Toledo
- Germanic peoples
- Barbarian Kingdoms
- Visigothic script
- Arianism
- Protofeudalism

== Sources ==
- Bachrach, Bernard S. "A Reassessment of Visigothic Jewish Policy, 589–711." American Historical Review 78, no. 1 (1973): 11–34.
- Collins, Roger. The Arab Conquest of Spain, 710–797. Oxford: Blackwell Publishers, 1989. Reprinted 1998.
- Collins, Roger. Law, Culture, and Regionalism in Early Medieval Spain. Great Yarmouth: Variorum, 1992. ISBN 0-86078-308-1.
- Collins, Roger. Visigothic Spain, 409–711. Oxford: Blackwell Publishing, 2004. ISBN 0-631-18185-7.
- DeHondt, Justin (2012). The Visigothic Kingdom of Toulouse: Conflict and Cooperation with the Roman Empire. Albion College.
- Drayson, Elizabeth (2007). The King and the Whore. King Roderick and La Cava. Palgrave Macmillan. ISBN 9781403974365.
- Fouracre, Paul, ed. (2005). The New Cambridge Medieval History, Volume 1 c.500-c.700. Oxford University Press. ISBN 978-0-521-36291-7.
- Halsall, Guy (2003). Warfare and Society in the Barbarian West, 450–900. Routledge. ISBN 0415239400.
- Heather, Peter. The Goths. Oxford: Blackwell Publishers, 1996.
- James, Edward, ed. Visigothic Spain: New Approaches. Oxford: Oxford University Press, 1980. ISBN 0-19-822543-1.
- Fernández-Morera, Darío (2016). The Myth of the Andalusian Paradise. Muslims, Christians and Jews under Islamic Rule in Medieval Spain. ISI Books. ISBN 9781504034692.
- Fernández, Damián; Lester, Molly; Wood, Jamie (2023). Rome and Byzantium in the Visigothic Kingdom: Beyond Imitatio Imperii. Amsterdam University Press. ISBN 978-94-6372-641-2.
- Fear, A. T. (1997). Lives of the Visigothic Fathers. Liverpool University. ISBN 0853235821.
- Kampers, Gerd (2008). Geschichte der Westgoten (in German). Ferdinand Schöningh. ISBN 9783506765178.
- Lacarra, José María. Estudios de alta edad media española. Valencia: 1975.
- Barrett, Graham (2018). "Theodoric I the Visigoth". In Nicholson, Oliver (ed.). The Oxford Dictionary of Late Antiquity. Vol. II. Oxford University Press.1475
- Martínez Jiménez, Javier; Isaac Sastre de Diego; Carlos Tejerizo García. (2018) The Iberian Peninsula between 300 and 850. An Archaeological Perspective. Late Antique and Early Medieval Iberia 6. Amsterdam: Amsterdam University Press. ISBN 9789089647771
- Sivan, Hagith. "On Foederati, Hospitalitas, and the Settlement of the Goths in A.D. 418." American Journal of Philology 108, no. 4 (1987): 759–772.
- Reinhart, Wilhelm (1951). "Germanische Helme in westgotischen Münzbildern" (PDF). Jahrbuch für Numismatik und Geldgeschichte (in German). Richard Pflaum: 43–46. Archived from the original (PDF) on 2020-07-16.
- Thompson, E. A. "The Barbarian Kingdoms in Gaul and Spain", Nottingham Mediaeval Studies, 7 (1963:4n11).
- Thompson, E. A. The Goths in Spain. Oxford: Clarendon Press, 1969.
- Tucker, Spencer C., ed. (2010). A Global Chronology of Conflict: From the Ancient World to the Modern Middle East. Vol. I. ABC-CLIO.
- Vázquez, Federico Gallegos (2011). "El ejército visigodo: el primer ejército español". In Leandro Martínez Peñas; Manuela Fernández Rodríguez (eds.). Reflexiones sobre poder, guerra y religión en la Historia de España. Vicerrectorado de Extensión Universitaria y de Centros Adscritos, Universidad Rey Juan Carlos. pp. 11–56. ISBN 978-84-615-2931-5.
- Wallace-Hadrill, John Michael. The Barbarian West, 400–1000. 3rd ed. London: Hutchison, 1967.
- Wolfram, Herwig (1988). History of the Goths. Thomas J. Dunlop, translator (Revised ed.). University of California Press. ISBN 0-520-05259-5.
