= Chintila =

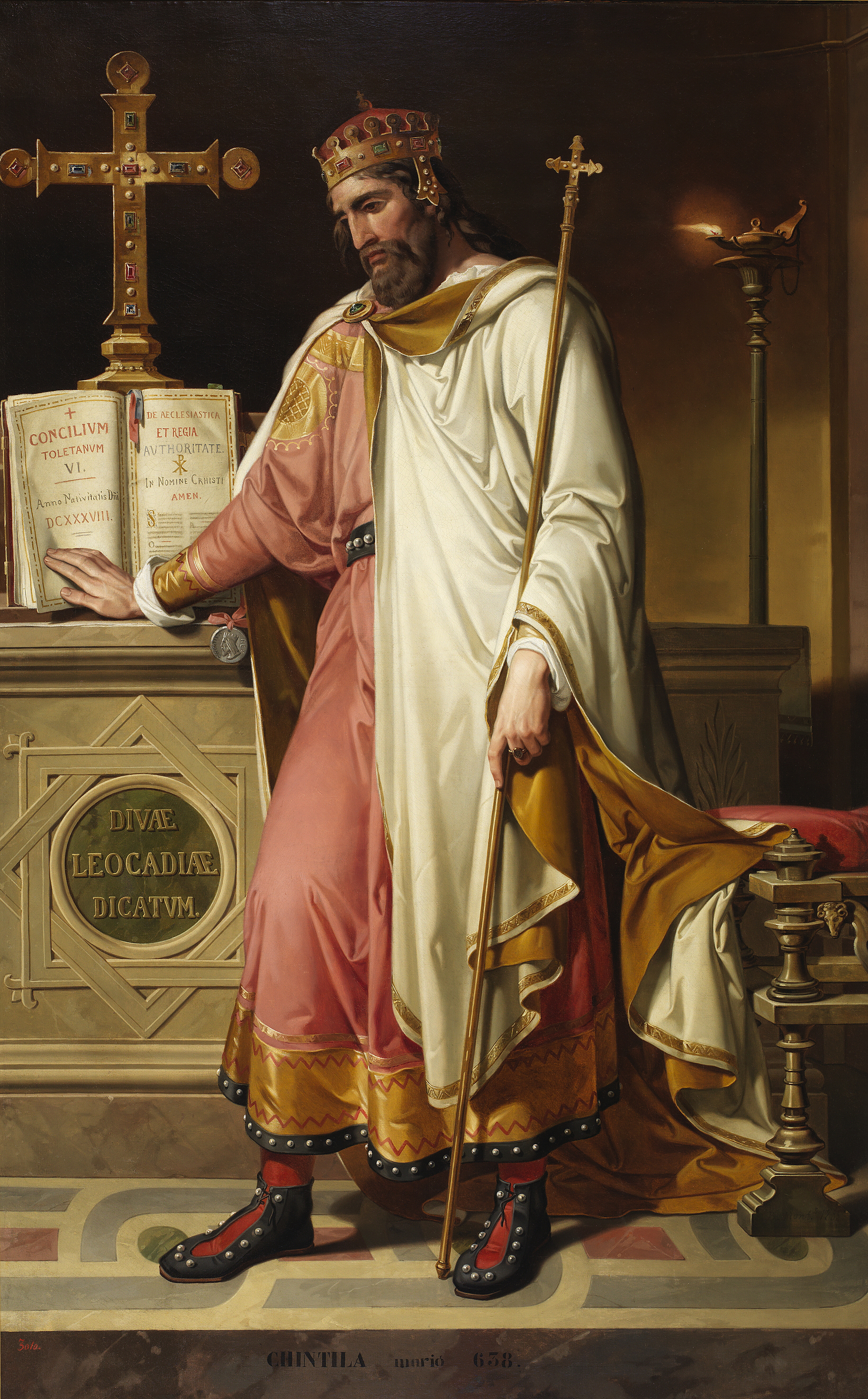
- Imaginary portrait of Chintila, by Bernardino Montañés in the Museo del Prado. Oil on canvas, 1855

King of Hispania
- Reign: 12 March 636 – 20 December, 639
- Predecessor: Sisenand
- Successor: Tulga
- Born: c. 606
- Died: 20 December 639 (aged 33)
- Issue: Tulga

Chintila (Latin: Chintila, Chintilla, Cintila; c. 606 – 20 December 639) was a Visigothic King of Hispania, Septimania and Galicia from 636. He succeeded Sisenand and reigned until he died of natural causes, ruling over the fifth and sixth provisional Councils of Toledo. He wrote poetry as well. He was succeeded by his son from an unknown wife, Tulga.

== Reign ==
Chintila became king after his predecessor Sisenand died in 636. It is unknown if or how he was related to Sisenand, and it is equally unclear how it came to be that Chintilla succeeded Sisenand. Both kings had tumultuous reigns, facing rebellions orchestrated by others who held some claim to the throne.

Chintilla convened two Councils at Toledo, the Fifth Council of Toledo in 636 and the Sixth Council of Toledo in 638. The Sixth Council discussed topics such as church rules, the treatment of Jewish people in Chintila's kingdom, and even laws of the kingdom regarding citizens' rights and property law. The council also discussed, at length, the qualifications of kings. They decided, for example, that only a person of Visigothic noble descent could be king. 53 bishops, deacons, or other church representatives attended the Sixth Council of Toledo.

== Persecution of Jewish Populations ==
As king, Chintila ensured that the Visigothic citizenry was entirely Christian, going so far as to ban Jewish people from the kingdom. The Sixth Council of Toledo commended him on these efforts, asking God to ensure that the king lives a long life and pledging to remain vigilant so that these policies continued into the future. This practice of persecution had become wide-spread under King Sisebut (r. 611/612-620), who mandated conversion. This practice was later condemned by the Fourth Council of Toledo. Chintila adopted similar practices and the later councils approved. Chintila’s reign laid the groundwork for future Visigothic kings to further persecute Jewish populations. In 650, Jewish populations living among the Visigoths swore an oath to King Recceswinth, indicating that they had – on penalty of death – been baptized as Christians under King Chintila but that, regardless of the forced nature of the conversion, they would continue to abide by Christian teachings instead of their Jewish heritage. The Visigothic Code further cemented Chintila's practice of persecuting Jewish populations, with one section specifically forbidding Visigothic citizens from protecting Jewish people in the Visigothic kingdom.

== Relations with the Papacy ==
King Chintila's poetry is indicative of the popular style of the time. An example is a poem that was sent to Pope Honorius I either shortly before or shortly after the Pope's death. Chintila donated a covering (or "velum") of some kind to St. Peter's Basilica, with a poem on it glorifying Pope Honorius and St. Peter, as well as praying for salvation. Chintila’s communication with the Pope was indicative of commitment to Christianity as outlined by the first Council of Nicaea.

== Historiography ==
Among the most frequently cited works regarding the Visigoths is E. A. Thompson's book The Goths in Spain. Published in 1969, Thompson argues that Christianity is a large part of what made the Visigoths, Visigoths. Chintila is mentioned briefly in the work, but Thompson argues that he must have been of relatively little consequence, as he was rarely mentioned in even contemporary literature.

Most modern sources mention Chintila only in passing; more time is spent with the provisional councils at Toledo that the king called. Roger Collins has built extensively on Thompson's work, describing at length the Visigothic kingdom. Collins generally agrees with the point that Thompson makes; in his 1995 book Early Medieval Spain, Collins argues that Christianity was a key aspect of Visigothic life. In a segment in Raymond Carr's book Spain: A History, Collins again wrote of advancements made by nearly every Visigothic king of the seventh century in the pursuit of the advancement of Christianity.

== Bibliography ==
- Brodman, James. (1979). The Roman-Visigothic Councils: Sixth Council of Toledo. Classical Folia: Studies in the Christian Perpetuation of the Classics. 33. 5.
  - This source was from James Brodman and is an English translation of the Sixth Council of Toledo.
- Buchberger, Erica. “Gothic Identity and the ‘Othering’ of Jews in Seventh-Century Spain.” University of Texas Rio Grande Valley Scholarworks, 2019. https://scholarworks.utrgv.edu/cgi/viewcontent.cgi?article=1055&context=hist_fac.
- Carr, Raymond, and Roger Collins. “Visigothic Spain, 409-711.” Essay. In Spain: A History, 39-62. New York, NY: Oxford University Press, 2001.
  - This source establishes that Chintila was a poet as well as a king. Because he is only mentioned in one sentence on one page, it can't correlate to any broader themes, nor can it give any specifics.
- Collins, Roger. “The Seventh-Century Kingdom.” Essay. In Early Medieval Spain: Unity in Diversity, 400-1000, 120. New York, NY: St Martin's Press, 1995.
- Heather, Peter. “The Kingdoms of the Goths: Sixth-Century Crises and Beyond.” Essay. In The Goths, 283–84. Oxford, UK: Blackwell Publishers, 1998.
- Kelly, Michael J. “The Liber Iudiciorum: A Visigothic Literary Guide to Institutional Authority and Self-Interest.” In The Visigothic Kingdom: The Negotiation of Power in Post-Roman Lberia, edited by Sabine Panzram and Paulo Pachá, 257–72. Amsterdam University Press, 2020. doi:10.2307/j.ctv1c5cs6z.17.
- Montañés Y Pérez, Bernadino. Chintila. Madrid, Spain: Museo Nacional del Prado, January 28, 2022. Museo Nacional del Prado. Madrid, Spain. https://www.museodelprado.es/en/the-collection/art-work/chintila/2e0c4d77-1870-4c4e-a169-32defa721da7.
  - Note: This source was only used as far as being where the image was taken from.
- Sarris, Peter. “The Princes of the Western Nations.” Essay. In Empires of Faith: The Fall of Rome to the Rise of Islam, 500-700, 320. New York, NY: Oxford University Press, 2011.
- Scott, S. P., ed. “The Visigothic Code.” UCA. Accessed 2022. http://libro.uca.edu/vcode/vg12-2.pdf.
- Thompson, Edward A. The Goths in Spain. Oxford: Clarendon Press, 1969.
- Trout, Dennis. “Poets and Readers in Seventh-Century Rome: Pope Honorius, Lucretius, and the Doors of St. Peter's: Traditio.” Cambridge Core. Cambridge University Press, October 30, 2020. https://www.cambridge.org/core/journals/traditio/article/poets-and-readers-in-seventhcentury-rome-pope-honorius-lucretius-and-the-doors-of-st-peters/ECC52321B6836F48091B1B6A8263D310.

Regnal titles
Preceded by Sisenand	King of the Visigoths; 12 March 636 – 20 December 639	Succeeded by Tulga
