= Iudila =

Visigoth self-proclaimed king

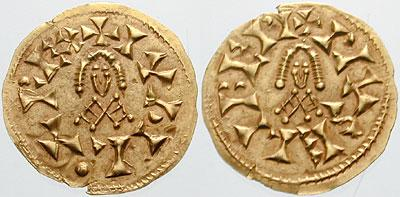
Tremissis de Iudila

Iudila (Note: Iudila is probably the deformation of the Gothic name Liubila, Liuvila or Gudila.) was a noble Visigoth who proclaimed himself king between the years 631? and 633?.

Known only by two tremis with the inscription « Iudila Rex », minted in Augusta Emerita (Mérida) and Iliberis (Granada), so its power must have been reduced to south of the kingdom.

On December 5 of 633, Iudila was excommunicated and deprived of his properties (Fourth Council of Toledo).

He must have starred in one of the various rebellions that occurred after the dethronement of Suintila. In opposition to and contemporaneously with the beginning of the reign of Sisenand. His affiliation is unknown, although it could be related to Suintila. The lists of Visigoth kings do not usually collect or number it, giving as king from 631 to Sisenand.

According to Caroline Humphrey, he was of Jewish origin. His birthname was Judah, Yehudah (יהודה), but he was called Judila ("Little Judah") by the Goths.

== See also ==
- Suniefred
- Froia
