= 631 (disambiguation) =

631 is a year.

631 may also refer to:

- 631, a natural number
- Area code 631, a New York telephone area code serving Suffolk County
