= Chindasuinth =

- King of the Visigoths
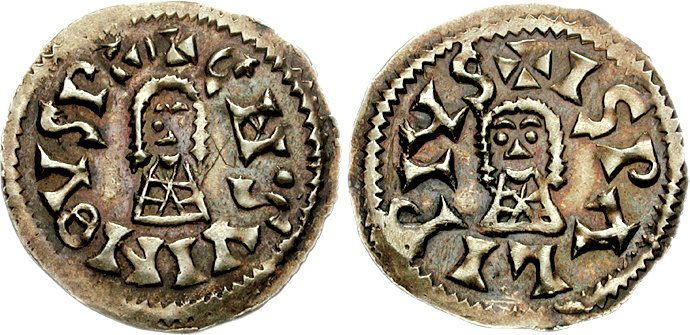
- A tremissis bearing a contemporary image of Chindasuinth
- Reign: 17 April 642 – 30 September 653
- Predecessor: Tulga
- Successor: Recceswinth
- Co-king: Recceswinth (20 January 649 – 30 September 653)
- Born: c. 563
- Died: September 30, 653 (aged 89–90)
- Burial: Monastery of San Román de Hornija
- Wife: Recciberga
- Issue: Recceswinth; Theodofred; Favila of Cantabria
- Religion: Chalcedonian Christianity

Chindasuinth (also spelled Chindaswinth, Chindaswind, Chindasuinto, Chindasvindo, or Khindaswinth; Latin: Chintasvintus, Cindasvintus; c. 563 – 30 September 653) was Visigothic King of Hispania, from 642 until his death in 653. He succeeded Tulga, from whom he took the throne in a coup. He was elected by the nobles and anointed by the bishops on April 30, 642.

== Life ==
Despite his great age (he was already 79 years old and a veteran of the Leovigild campaigns and the religious rebellions after conversions from Arianism were forced) his tyrannical and cruel character made the clergy and noblesse submit to him out of fear of execution and banishment. He cemented his control by preempting an alleged revolt: in a short period of time he executed over 200 Goths of the most noble families and 500 more from the petty nobility. Additionally, he arranged for the banishment of many potential adversaries and the confiscation of their property. All this took place before any rebellion actually occurred and without any investigation or trial or, for that matter, actual belief that a revolt was pending.

The Seventh Council of Toledo, held on 16 October 646, consented to and backed his actions, toughening the punishments applied to those who rose against the sovereign and extended them even to members of the clergy.

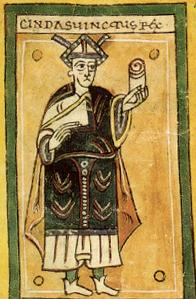
Chindasuinth holding the law, as portrayed in the tenth-century Codex Vigilanus

Smothering all opposition, he brought peace to the realm and a degree of order not known previously. To continue his legacy, he had his son Recceswinth, at the urging of Braulio of Zaragoza, crowned co-king on 20 January 649 and attempted to establish, as many had before, a hereditary monarchy. His associate-son was thenceforth the true ruler of the Visigoths, presiding in the name of his father until 653, the year of Chindasuinth’s passing.

Notwithstanding the vigorous and martial nature of his political activities, Chindasuinth is recorded in religious annals as a great benefactor of the church, donating many lands and bestowing privileges upon clerics. He improved public estates with the confiscated goods of the dispossessed nobility as well as through improved taxation methods. In the military arena, he undertook campaigns against rebellious Basques and Lusitanians.

He reversed the anti-Jewish laws of his predecessor, Tulga, and put a stop to policies forcing Jewish people to convert to Christianity or emigrate. However, he did enforce the law that all Christians engaging in Jewish traditions be put to death. It is believed that this was in an effort to stop conversions to Judaism.

He promulgated many laws dealing with civil matters. With the help of Braulio, bishop of Zaragoza, he began the elaboration of a territorial code of law to cover both the Gothic and Hispano-Roman populations. A draft form of that work, the Liber Iudiciorum, was promulgated in the second year of his reign. It underwent refinement throughout the rest of his sovereignty and was finished by his son in 654. In 643 or 644 it superseded both the Breviary of Alaric used by the natives and the Code of Leovigild used by the Goths.

According to Edward Gibbon, during his reign, Muslim raiders began harassing Iberia: "As early as the time of Othman (644–656), their piratical squadrons had ravaged the coast of Andalusia". However, this reading poses a problem difficult to overcome: the Muslim Rashiduns were still struggling to conquer Tripolitania in present-day Libya. Chindasuinth spent the last years of his life, as so many mediaeval monarchs did, in acts of piety for the sake of his immortal soul. He commissioned St Fructuosus to build the monastery of San Román de Hornija on the Douro, with the intention of having it house his tomb. His remains rest there next to those of his wife, Riciberga. Nevertheless, Eugene II, bishop of Toledo, provided a judgment on the life of this king by writing the following inscription:

I, Chindasuinth, ever the friend of evil deeds: committer of crimes Chindaswinth I, impious, obscene, ugly and wicked; not seeking the best, valuing the worst.

== Legacy ==
Chindasuinth was succeeded by his eldest son, Recceswinth, who continued his reforms. A younger son, Theodofred, was blinded by Wamba.

== Sources ==
- Collins, Roger. Visigothic Spain, 409–711. Blackwell Publishing, 2004.
- King, P. D. "King Chindasvind and the First Territorial Law-code of the Visiogothic Kingdom." Visigothic Spain: New Approaches. ed. Edward James. Oxford: Clarendon Press, 1980. pp 131–157.
- Thompson, E. A. The Goths in Spain. Oxford: Clarendon Press, 1969.

== Notes ==
Regnal titles
Preceded by Tulga	King of the Visigoths; 17 April 642 – 30 September 653 with Recceswinth (20 January 649 – 30 September 653)	Succeeded by Recceswinth
