= Tulga (surname) =

Tulga is a surname. Notable people with the surname include:

- Tulga (living 642), Visigothic King
- Tömör-Ochiryn Tulga (born 1998), Mongolian wrestler
