= Recciberga =

- Queen consort of the Visigothic Kingdom
- Died: between 646 and 657
- Burial: San Roman de Ornija
- Spouse: Chindasuinth

Recciberga (also spelled: Reciberga or Reciverga, Latin: Rekiverga; died between October 18, 646 and November 13, 657) was Queen of the Visigoths (not later than 646 - not later than 657) by marriage to Chindasuinth or Recceswinth.

== Life ==
Her existence is confirmed by two sources. The first is a royal charter. dated 646, and the second is her epitaph

Recciberga's lineage is not mentioned in any of the documents. She could have been from an important Visigoth noble family, and she could have been possibly related to Rikimir.

On October 18, 646 King Chindasuinth issued a charter to the abbot of a monastery near El Bierzo, mentioning Recciberga as a queen. There is still some dispute between medievalists as to the authenticity of this document, though. The charter appears as follows:

“Domnis sanctis gloriosissimis mihique post Deum fortissimis patronis sanctorum martyrum Iusti et Pastoris sive sancte Marie et sancti Martini episcopi, quorum basilica, vel monasterium situm est juxta rivulum quod dicitur Molina, sub monte Irago, in confinio Vergidensi, et est fundamentum ipsum monasterium a tibi Fructuoso Abbate, ego Chindasvintux rex and Reciverga regina"

Her epitaph, written by Archbishop Eugene of Toledo, records her as having been married to the king for seven years.

There is no current consensus among historians about which of the rulers of the Visigothic kingdom was married to Recciberga. Some medievalists consider her the wife of King Chindasuinth, who ruled the Visigoths in 642-653, and suggest that Recciberga was the mother of his eldest son and heir, Recceswinth. Other historians call her the wife of Recceswinth. They believe that the first mention of her as a queen dates back to the time when her husband was co-ruler with his father, and also had a royal title. In this case, Recciberga should have died long before her husband, who died on September 1, 672. There is no evidence of the married life of King Recceswinth in medieval sources, and as so it is assumed he died childless.

== Death ==
She died abruptly at the age of twenty-two years and eight months, according to her epitaph. The exact date of her death is unknown, but it is assumed that she should have died no earlier than 646, when she was mentioned in the charter, and no later than November 13, 657, the date of the death of Eugene of Toledo.

She was buried in the monastery of San Roman de Ornija, located in the village of the same name. Later, King Chindasuinth was also buried there, his epitaph written by the same Archbishop.
