= Reccimer =

Reccimer or Ricimer, was the son of King Suintila of the Visigothic Kingdom and Co-King with his father.

Born in 610, he became Governor of Toledo in 625, with his uncle Geila as regent. Reccimer was installed as Co-King in 626. His father became unpopular for attempting to make the monarchy hereditary.

In 631, the Governor of Septimania, Sisenand, declared himself King with the aid of the Franks and deposed Suintila. Reccimer died that year in Zaragoza.
