= 631 =

Calendar year

631 in various calendars
- Gregorian calendar: 631; DCXXXI
- Ab urbe condita: 1384
- Armenian calendar: 80; ԹՎ Ձ
- Assyrian calendar: 5381
- Balinese saka calendar: 552–553
- Bengali calendar: 37–38
- Berber calendar: 1581
- Buddhist calendar: 1175
- Burmese calendar: −7
- Byzantine calendar: 6139–6140
- Chinese calendar: 庚寅年 (Metal Tiger); 3328 or 3121 — to — 辛卯年 (Metal Rabbit); 3329 or 3122
- Coptic calendar: 347–348
- Discordian calendar: 1797
- Ethiopian calendar: 623–624
- Hebrew calendar: 4391–4392
- Hindu calendars
- Vikram Samvat: 687–688
- Shaka Samvat: 552–553
- Kali Yuga: 3731–3732
- Holocene calendar: 10631
- Iranian calendar: 9–10
- Islamic calendar: 9–10
- Japanese calendar: N/A
- Javanese calendar: 521–522
- Julian calendar: 631; DCXXXI
- Korean calendar: 2964
- Minguo calendar: 1281 before ROC 民前1281年
- Nanakshahi calendar: −837
- Seleucid era: 942/943 AG
- Thai solar calendar: 1173–1174
- Tibetan calendar: ལྕགས་ཕོ་སྟག་ལོ་ (male Iron-Tiger); 757 or 376 or −396 — to — ལྕགས་མོ་ཡོས་ལོ་ (female Iron-Hare); 758 or 377 or −395

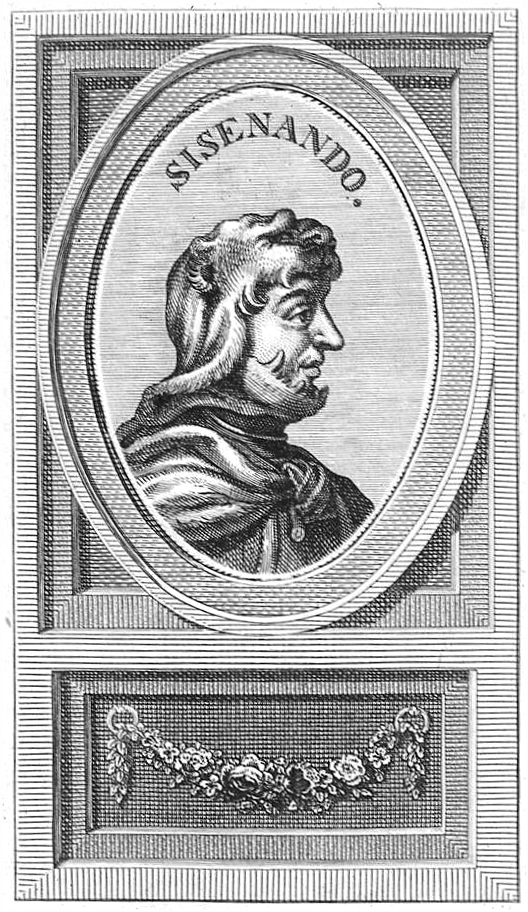
King Sisenand (c. 605–636)

Year 631 (DCXXXI) was a common year starting on Tuesday of the Julian calendar. The denomination 631 for this year has been used since the early medieval period, when the Anno Domini calendar era became the prevalent method in Europe for naming years.

== Events ==
=== By place ===
==== Byzantine Empire ====
- Emperor Heraclius appoints Cyrus, patriarch of Alexandria, with power to act as viceroy (dioikesis) of Egypt. He begins a 10-year persecution against the non-Chalcedonian Coptic Christians.

==== Europe ====
- Battle of Wogastisburg: The Slavs under King Samo defeat the Austrasian Franks, in a three-day battle. King Dagobert I is forced to retreat; the Franks with their allies are slaughtered. Samo invades Thuringia and undertakes looting raids.
- King Suintila is overthrown after a 10-year reign by his son Sisenand, with the aid of Dagobert I. The Visigothic nobles offer him a 500-pound plate made of pure gold. Sisenand becomes new king of the Visigothic Kingdom and declares his father a tyrant for his many crimes.
- The Saxons (Northern Germany) appeal to Dagobert I, against the yearly tribute (500 cows) which they still pay (approximate date).

==== Britain ====
- King Edwin of Northumbria refortifies the city walls of York, probably including the building of the so-called Anglian Tower (approximate date).

==== Persia ====
- Azarmidokht (daughter of king Khosrau II) succeeds her sister Borandukht, as monarch of the Persian Empire.
- Azarmidokht is succeeded after a few months reign by Khosrau IV, who becomes new ruler (shah) of Persia.
- Hormizd VI proclaims himself king in Nisibis (Turkey). He seizes the throne and will reign until 632.

==== Asia ====
- Emperor Tai Zong sends envoys to the Xueyantuo, vassals of the Eastern Turkic Khaganate, bearing gold and silk in order to obtain the release of enslaved Chinese prisoners, who were captured during the transition from the Sui to the Tang dynasty from the northern frontier. The embassy succeeds in freeing 80,000 men and women, who are safely returned to China.
- Tai Zong establishes a new Daoist abbey, out of gratitude for Daoist priests who had apparently cured the crown prince of an illness.

=== By topic ===
==== Religion ====
- Benjamin I, Coptic patriarch of Alexandria, escapes during the persecutions of his fellow Christians and hides in the monastery of St. Macarius (Upper Egypt).
- Xuanzang, Chinese Buddhist monk, crosses the Indus River at Hund and travels to Kashmir ("Heaven on Earth") in northwestern India (approximate date).

== Births ==
- Muhammad ibn Abi Bakr, son of Abu Bakr and brought up by Ali
- Temmu, emperor of Japan (approximate date)
- Yeh Fa-shan, Daoist wonder-worker (d. 720)

== Deaths ==
- Athanasius I Gammolo, Syriac Orthodox Patriarch of Antioch.
- Borandukht, queen of the Persian Empire
- Cinaed mac Luchtren, king of the Picts
- Rayhana, slave and wife of Muhammad
