= Reccared II =

Visigothic King

- King of Hispania, Septimania and Gallaecia
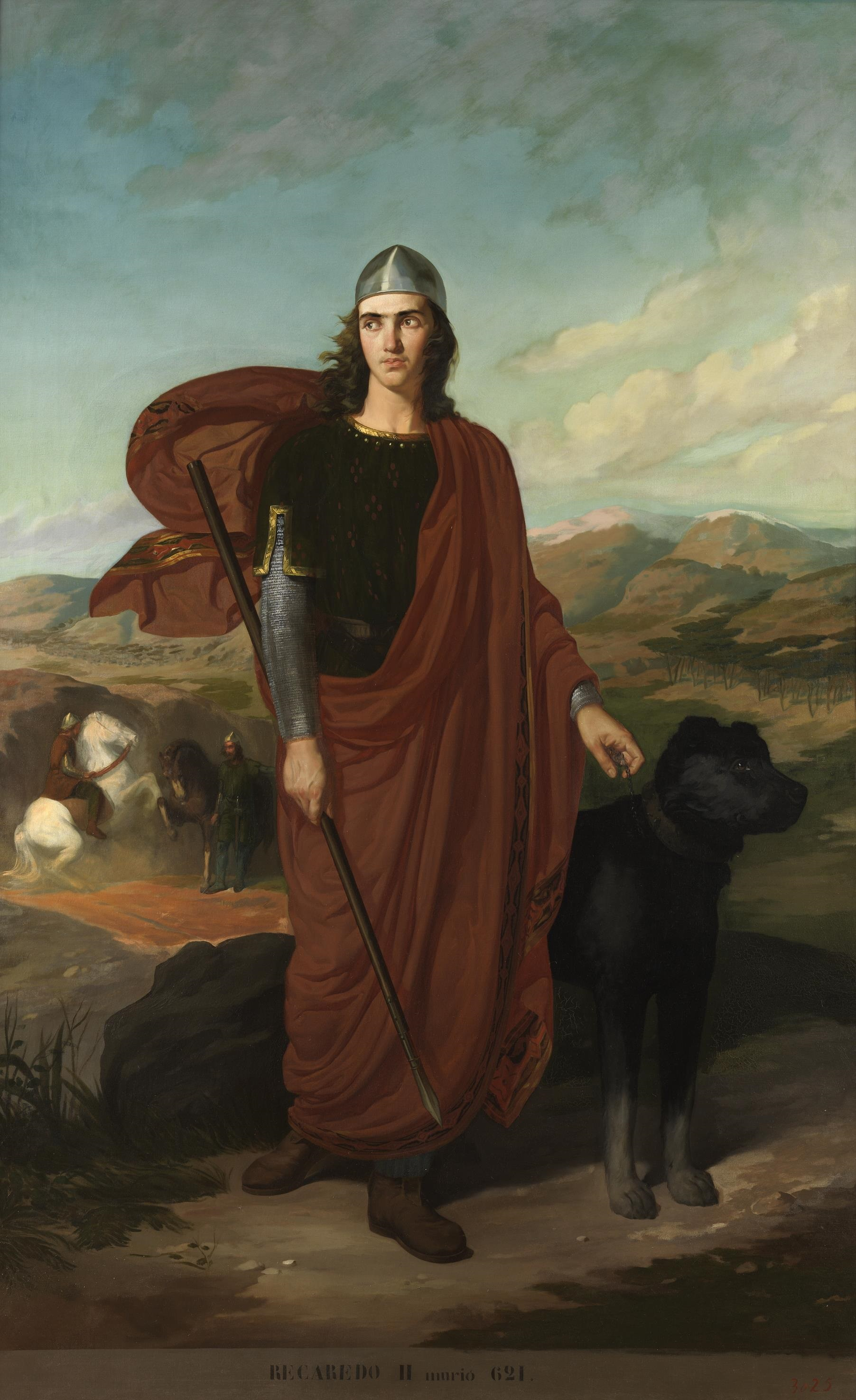
- Imaginary portrait of Reccared II by Francisco Aznar. Oil on canvas (1858)

King of the Visigoths
- Reign: c. February 621 – c. March 621
- Predecessor: Sisebut
- Successor: Suintila
- Died: c. March 621
- Religion: Chalcedonian Christianity

Reccared II (in Spanish, Galician and Portuguese: Recaredo), (? – March 621) was Visigothic King of Hispania, Septimania and Galicia briefly in 621, though the length of the reign exactly is debated to last from several days to just over a year.

== Biography ==
His father and predecessor was Sisebut. He was but a child when placed on the throne and as with most Visigothic attempts to establish a royal dynasty, Sisebut's was opposed by the nobility and ultimately failed.

His death allowed his general, the strongman Suintila, to accede to the throne.

== Sources ==
- Collins, Roger (2004). Visigothic Spain, 409–711. Blackwell Publishing.
- Thompson, Edward Arthur (1969). The Goths in Spain. Oxford: Clarendon Press.

Regnal titles
Preceded by Sisebut	King of the Visigoths; February 621 – March 621	Succeeded by Suintila
