= Suintila =

Visigothic King

- King of the Visigoths
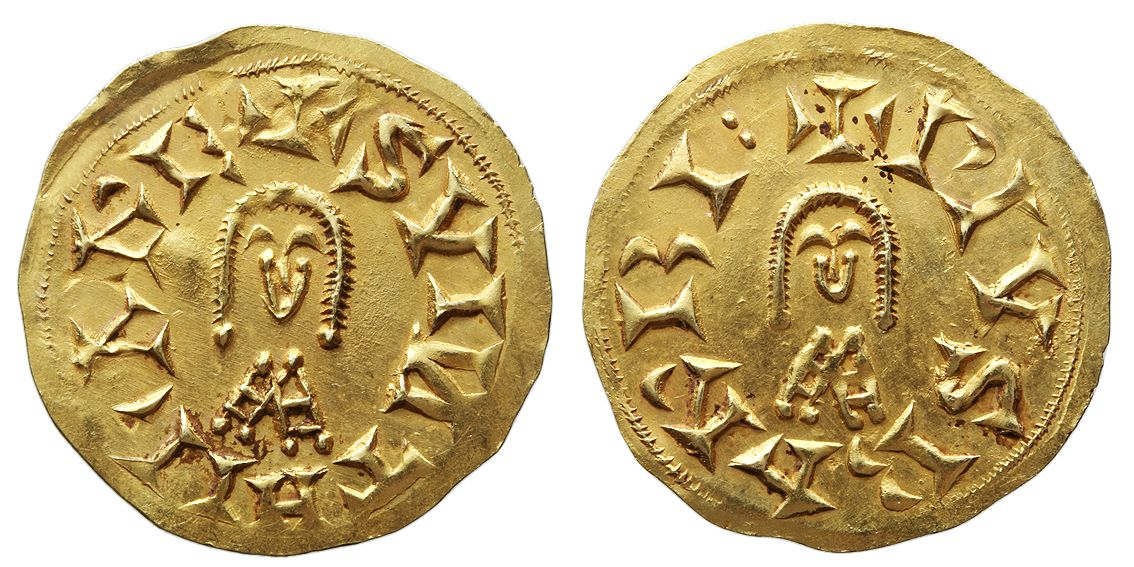
- Tremissis of Suintila, bearing his effigy.

King of Hispania
- Reign: c. March 621 – 26 March 631
- Predecessor: Reccared II
- Successor: Sisenand
- Born: 588
- Died: 633/635 (aged 45-47)
- Father: Reccared I
- Mother: Baddo
- Religion: Chalcedonian Christianity

Suintila, or Suinthila, Swinthila, Svinthila; (588 – 633/635) was Visigothic King of Hispania, Septimania and Galicia from 621 to 631. He was a son of Reccared I and his wife Bado, and a brother of the general Geila. Under Suintila there was an unprecedented peace and unity across the Kingdom of the Visigoths. As a direct result, by 624 the king was able to muster the forces necessary to retake those lands that had been under the control of the Eastern Roman Empire.

== Life ==
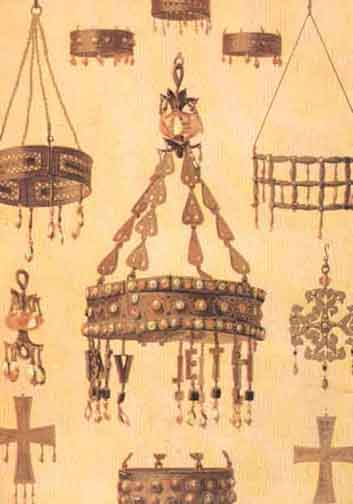
Votive crowns and crosses, from a 19th-century lithograph.

Suintila was the second born son of King Reccared I, born sometime in AD 588 and after the deposition of his older brother Liuva II in 603, he was spared by the nobility, possibly due to his age (he was 15). Most of his life thereafter is unknown until around the year 620 when, under the orders of King Sisebut, he fought against the Romans, who had re-established themselves on the Iberian Peninsula during the 550s. The following year, he was elected king after the deaths of Sisebut and his son Reccared II. Once on the throne, Suintila secured a peace unknown in Hispania since the early 5th century, as no foreign troops were on its soil for the next 87 years. He managed this after ejecting the Eastern Roman Empire from their various strongholds in the Levante and according to Isidore of Seville, Suintila was the first to rule all of Spain. What Sisebut had begun by retaking Cartagena, Malaga, Sagunto, and Assidonia from the Byzantines, Suintila finished in 624 when he seized what his predecessor had not at Algarve. Byzantine power was severely weakened by Suintila's successes in the former enclave of the Eastern Empire, which was accompanied by a reduction in the enclave’s standing army. (Note: About the Byzantines during this time, historian Roger Collins avows that "The empire’s military weakness in these years explains the failure of the emperor Heraclius (610–641) to reinforce the Byzantine enclave in Spain," adding this was why at this particular time "the imperial forces there were finally expelled by king Suinthila.") Like Liuvigild before him, Suintila also attempted to bring the Basques under his command, which led to the creation of a new town named Ologicus—believed to be the site of the later Olite in Navarre—but this has yet to be confirmed by archaeologists. Isidore of Seville characterized Suintila as a man of "faith, prudence, industry, strenuousness in examination in the passing of judicial sentences, outstanding care in the exercise of rulership, munificence towards all, generosity to the poor, a disposition towards quick forgiveness; so that not only is he worthy to be called the ruler of the people but also the father of the poor."

Many did not share this view according to the Chronicle of Fredegar, which reports Suintila had become a hated figure for attempting to make the kingdom hereditary, appointing his son Reccimer as co-regent in 626. The text goes on to relate that from among the nobility through which Suintila had risen, emerged one named Sisenand, who in 631, led a rebellion in the Ebro valley after securing a promise of military aide from the Frankish king Dagobert I. The Frankish king dispatched his forces under the generals Abundancius and Venerandus, who, once arriving at Saragossa, declared Sisenand king of the Goths. At the Fourth Council of Toledo in 633, Sisenand's seizure of power was legitimized by the Council, while Suintila was accordingly accused of various iniquities, forced to renounce his power, excommunicated, stripped of his possessions, and exiled along with his family.

In 1858, a farmer's plough uncovered what was to become the Treasure of Guarrazar and Torredonjimeno, which consisted of eleven votive crowns, three of them had names on them; these names included those of Suintila, Recceswinth, and Sónnica.

== Bibliography ==
- Barbero, A.; Loring, M.I. (2005). "The Catholic Visigothic Kingdom". In Paul Fouracre (ed.). The New Cambridge Medieval History I: c.500–c.700. Cambridge and New York: Cambridge University Press. ISBN 978-0-52136-291-7.
- Collins, Roger (1999). Early Medieval Europe, 300–1000. New York: St. Martin’s Press. ISBN 978-0-31221-885-0.
- Collins, Roger (2004). Visigothic Spain, 409–711. Malden, MA: Blackwell Publishing. ISBN 978-0-47075-461-0.
- Heather, Peter (2018). Rome Resurgent: War and Empire in the Age of Justinian. Oxford and New York: Oxford University Press. ISBN 978-0-19936-274-5.
- Wallace-Hadrill, J. M. (2004). The Barbarian West, 400–1000. Malden, MA: Wiley-Blackwell. ISBN 978-0-63120-292-9.
- Wolfram, Herwig (1997). The Roman Empire and its Germanic Peoples. Berkeley and Los Angeles: University of California Press. ISBN 0-520-08511-6.

Regnal titles
Preceded by Reccared II	King of the Visigoths; March 621 – 26 March 631	Succeeded by Sisenand
