= Reccopolis =

Cultural property in Zorita de los Canes, Spain

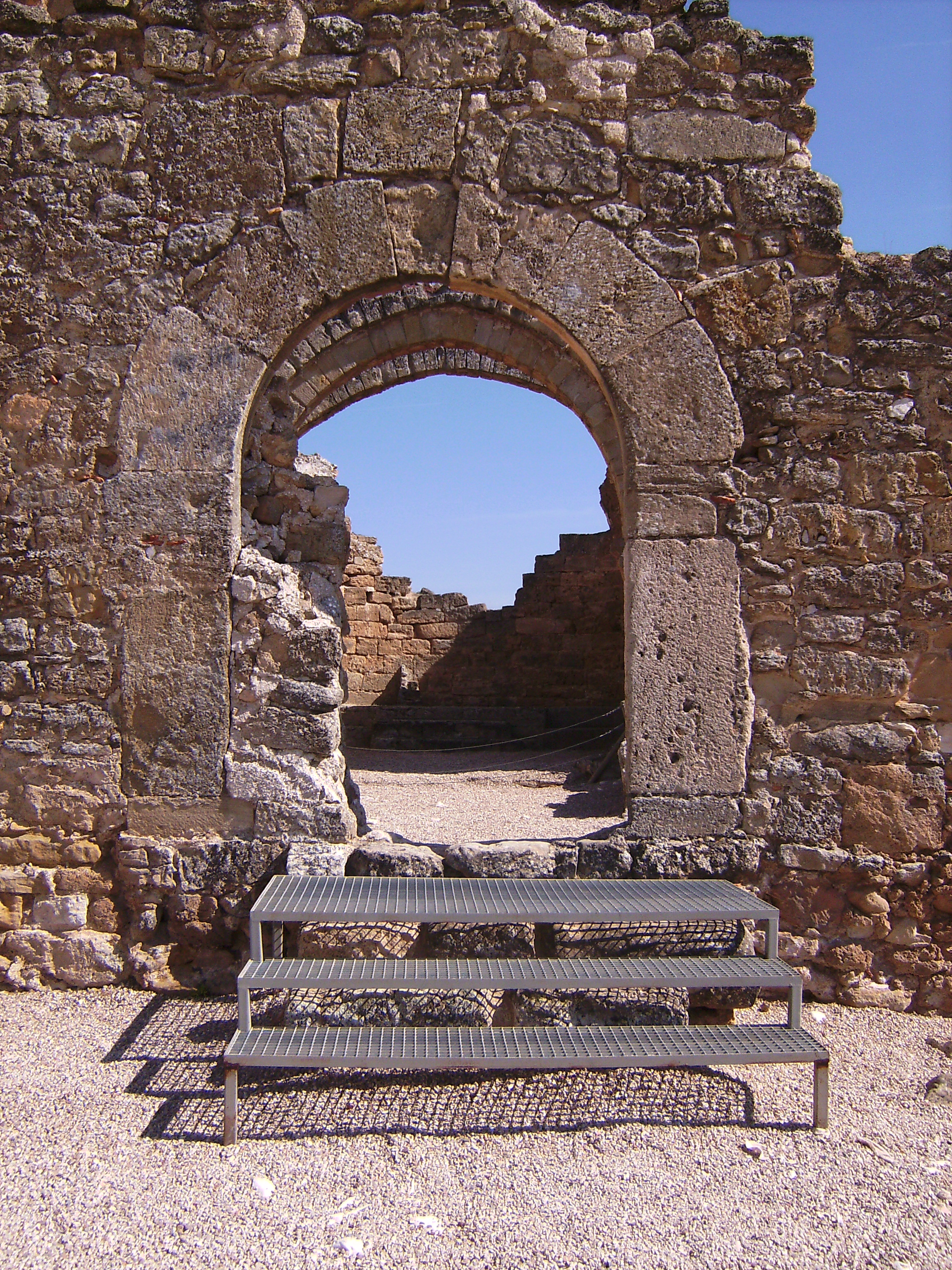

- Location within Spain Location within Castilla-La Mancha Location within Province of Guadalajara
- 40°19′19″N 2°53′33″W
- Type: Settlement
- Periods: Early Middle Ages
- Location: Zorita de los Canes, Province of Guadalajara, Castilla–La Mancha, Spain

History
- Built: 578
- Abandoned: 9th century

Reccopolis (Spanish: Recópolis; Latin: Reccopolis), is an archaeological site located near Zorita de los Canes, a small village in the province of Guadalajara, Spain. It represents one of the Visigoth cities founded in Iberia during the post-Roman period.

Established by Visigothic king Liuvigild, who ruled Iberia in 568–586 AD, Reccopolis is one of only two cities in Western Europe known to have been founded between the fifth and eighth centuries. Its remains serve as a case study for understanding the ideas and ideals of a city in Late Antiquity, reflecting influences from classical Roman models.

Discovered in the 1890s, the site underwent archaeological excavations starting in the 1940s under Juan Cabré, with ongoing efforts revealing the monumental area within the walled enclosure. Notable remains include an aqueduct located 2 km to the east, recognized as the first new, urban aqueduct in the Iberian Peninsula in two centuries and the last built in the Roman way.

== Historical information ==
Reccopolis was founded in the year 578. The date is given in chronicle of John of Biclaro:

With tyrants destroyed on all sides and the invaders of Spain overcome, King Leovigild had peace to reside with his own people. He founded a city in Celtiberia, which he named Recopolis after his son. He endowed it with splendid buildings, both within the walls and in the suburbs, and he established privileges for the people of the new city.

A cache of coins was discovered in the city's palace, fixing the date of construction between 580–583. Coin variety indicated cultural reach, with gold coins of the Merovingian series, Suevic coins from Galicia and of Justinian II, as well as from Visigothic Hispania itself. Reccopolis had an active mint, coins from which have been found dating to the reign of Wittiza, in the early eighth century.

The city was named by the Visigothic king Liuvigild to honor his son Reccared I and to serve as Reccared's seat as co-king in the Visigothic province of Celtiberia, to the west of Carpetania, where the main capital, Toledo, lay. As a post-Roman royal foundation the city's only European rival in the sixth century was Ravenna. In the eighth century the Visigoths at Reccopolis found themselves subjugated under the newly arrived Muslim invaders. The Moors conserved the city as Madinät Raqquba and though they reused building materials to construct a fortification on a hill facing the city, the city declined and was burned, looted, razed, and incrementally abandoned in the tenth century. It lay forgotten until the twentieth century.

Today Reccopolis is a large field of ruins in the Cerro de la Olíva. There are plans to protect the partially excavated site as Parque Arqueológico Recópolis. In 2007, the Museo Arqueológico Regional in Alcalá de Henares mounted an exhibition called "Recópolis: un paseo por la ciudad Visigoda" and published an accompanying catalogue.

== Design ==
Hispania in 586 AD

Archaeological excavations at Reccopolis have revealed traces of city walls with towers every thirty metres, an aqueduct, commercial and residential quarters covering 30 hectares, several markets, and a mint. Its urban core was centered on a palace with administrative as well as royal functions, connected with a palatine chapel, an arrangement that has Byzantine parallels. On the western wall, a single entrance gate provided access. Within this a second gate formed an entrance to an "upper city" of the palace compound and its attached chapel. The "lower city" outside contained lodgings for the ordinary citizens, commercial districts and a barracks.

The palace was two stories tall. The lower story was a single space, perhaps a granary, with column bases supporting the story above. Flooring remnants indicate the second story may have been the piano nobile. The roofs were tiled, as they had been in Roman times. The palace chapel is possibly the last of the Visigothic Arian churches, but it was overlaid by the Romanesque hermitage of Nuestra Señora de Recatel, which was constructed on the ruined site. It was of basilica construction, with a central nave separated by solid walls from the flanking naves. These exited into the transept, but did not communicate directly with the nave. Its hemispherical apse was rectangular in outer appearance. A deep narthex was entered by a single central door.
