= Sisebut =

Visigothic King

- King of Hispania, Septimania and Gallaecia
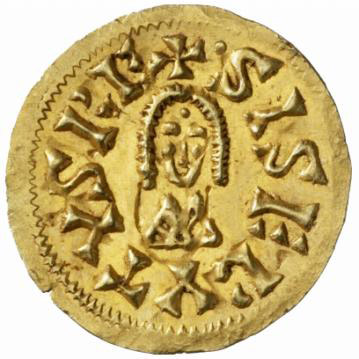
- Golden Tremissis of Sisebutus rex

King of the Visigoths
- Reign: c. February/March 612 – c. February 621
- Predecessor: Gundemar
- Successor: Reccared II
- Born: c. 565
- Died: c. February 621 (aged 56)
- Spouse: Unknown
- Issue: Reccared II
- Religion: Chalcedonian Christianity

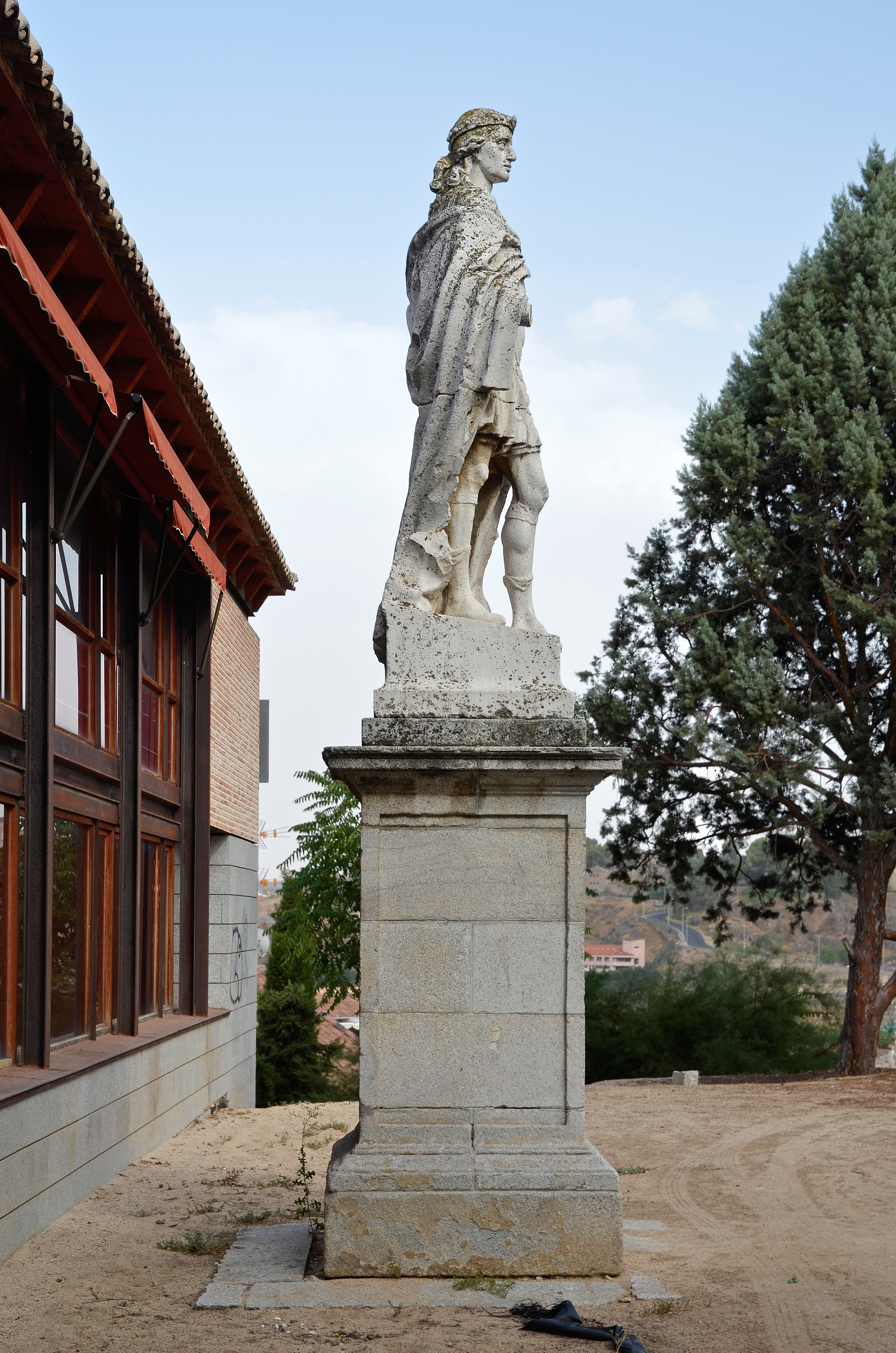
Statue (as imagined) of Sisebut in Toledo

Sisebut (Latin: Sisebutus; Spanish: Sisebuto; also Sisebuth, Sisebur, Sisebod or Sigebut; c. 565 – February 621) was King of the Visigoths and ruler of Hispania, Gallaecia, and Septimania from 612 until his death in 621. His rule was marked by forced Christian conversion, anti-Judaic measures, Roman-like administration, and intellectual cosmopolitanism.

== Biography ==
According to a passage in the Chronicle of Fredegar, prior to being named king of the Visigoths, Sisebut reportedly captured Cantabria from the Franks; which is a puzzling entry, since this region was already part of the Visigothic kingdom under Leovigild. Nonetheless, it can be said that, during his reign, Sisebut campaigned successfully against the remnants of Byzantine power in Spania, strengthened Visigothic control over the Basques and Cantabrians, developed friendly relations with the Lombards of Italy, and reinforced the fleet that had been established by his predecessor, Leovigild. Most all of the territories in the Iberian Peninsula originally seized by the Eastern Roman Emperor Justinian during his campaigns into the former Western Roman Empire were taken back by Sisebut, with the exception of the Algarve.

Sisebut was known for his devout adherence to Chalcedonian Christianity. In 612, upon his accession to the throne, he forced his Jewish subjects to convert to Christianity. In 616, he ordered that those Jews who refused to convert to Christianity be punished with the lash. Actions taken against Jews were part of a broader "legal tradition of imperial legislation" that even had the "approval of the Church Fathers," according to historian Herwig Wolfram. Aside from oppressing religious groups, Sisebut demonstrated his adherence to his Christian faith by officially consecrating churches, such as the martyrial basilica St. Leocadia in 618 at Toledo.

From what is known, Sisebut was closely associated with the bishop, scholar, and encyclopaedist Isidore of Seville, and is even—regal trappings included—depicted as the author of a Latin poem on astronomy, Carmen de Luna or Praefatio de Libro Rotarum, dedicated to a friend, who is identified with Isidore. (Note: Sisebut's ecclesiastical letters survive to the present day and can be found in the following: Sisebut, King of the Visigoths. The Letters of Sisebut. Translated by D.P. Curtin. Philadelphia: Dalcassian Publishing Co., 2016.) To this end, Sisebut was known to have been "an active supporter of intellectual and cultural life in Spain." Historian Chris Wickham mentions the letters and poetry of Sisebut, comparing him with Alfred the Great for having a reputation as a writer, but adds that aside from this and his persecution of "the Jewish population in Spain", he was "otherwise undistinguished." Despite this seeming lack of notoriety, Wickham claims that Sisebut's writing contains Roman cultural style and his political practices were reminiscent of late Roman traditions that were expressed by his successors as late as 700. One of those Roman practices was the minting of coins, which Sisebut, along with other Visigothic kings before and after him, struck at Recopolis.

Sisebut had a son, who succeeded him as Reccared II on his death.

== Bibliography ==
- Collins, Roger (2004). Visigothic Spain, 409–711. Malden, MA: Blackwell Publishing. ISBN 978-0-47075-461-0.
- Encisco, Lauro Olmo (2020). "Recopolis – The Representation of Power in a Complex Landscape". In Sabine Pazram; Paulo Pachá (eds.). The Visigothic Kingdom: The Negotiation of Power in Post-Roman Iberia. Amsterdam University Press. pp. 215–234. ISBN 978-9-46372-063-2.
- Frassetto, Michael (2003). Encyclopedia of Barbarian Europe: Society in Transformation. Santa Barbara, CA: ABC-CLIO. ISBN 978-1-57607-263-9.
- Heather, Peter (2018). Rome Resurgent: War and Empire in the Age of Justinian. Oxford and New York: Oxford University Press. ISBN 978-0-19936-274-5.
- Isidore of Seville (1970). Guido Donini (ed.). History of the Goths, Vandals, and Suevi (2nd ed.). Leiden: E.J.Brill.
- Moorhead, John (2001). The Roman Empire Divided: The Post-Roman World, 400–700. London: Longman. ISBN 978-0-58225-111-3.
- Sánchez Ramos, Isabel; Morín de Pablos, Jorge (2020). "Ecclesiastical Landscapes in the Visigothic Capital and Countryside of Toledo (Spain)". In Sabine Pazram; Paulo Pachá (eds.). The Visigothic Kingdom: The Negotiation of Power in Post-Roman Iberia. Amsterdam University Press. pp. 315–336. ISBN 978-9-46372-063-2.
- Sisebut, King of the Visigoths. "Epistolæ: Letter sent by King Sisebut of the Visigoths". Archived from the original on 2010-06-10.
- Wickham, Chris (2009). The Inheritance of Rome: Illuminating the Dark Ages, 400–1000. New York: Viking. ISBN 978-0-67002-098-0.
- Wolfram, Herwig (1988). History of the Goths. Berkeley and Los Angeles: University of California Press. ISBN 0-520-05259-5.

Regnal titles
Preceded by Gundemar	King of the Visigoths; February/March 612 – February 621	Succeeded by Reccared II
