= Tulga =

Visigothic King

- King of the Visigoths
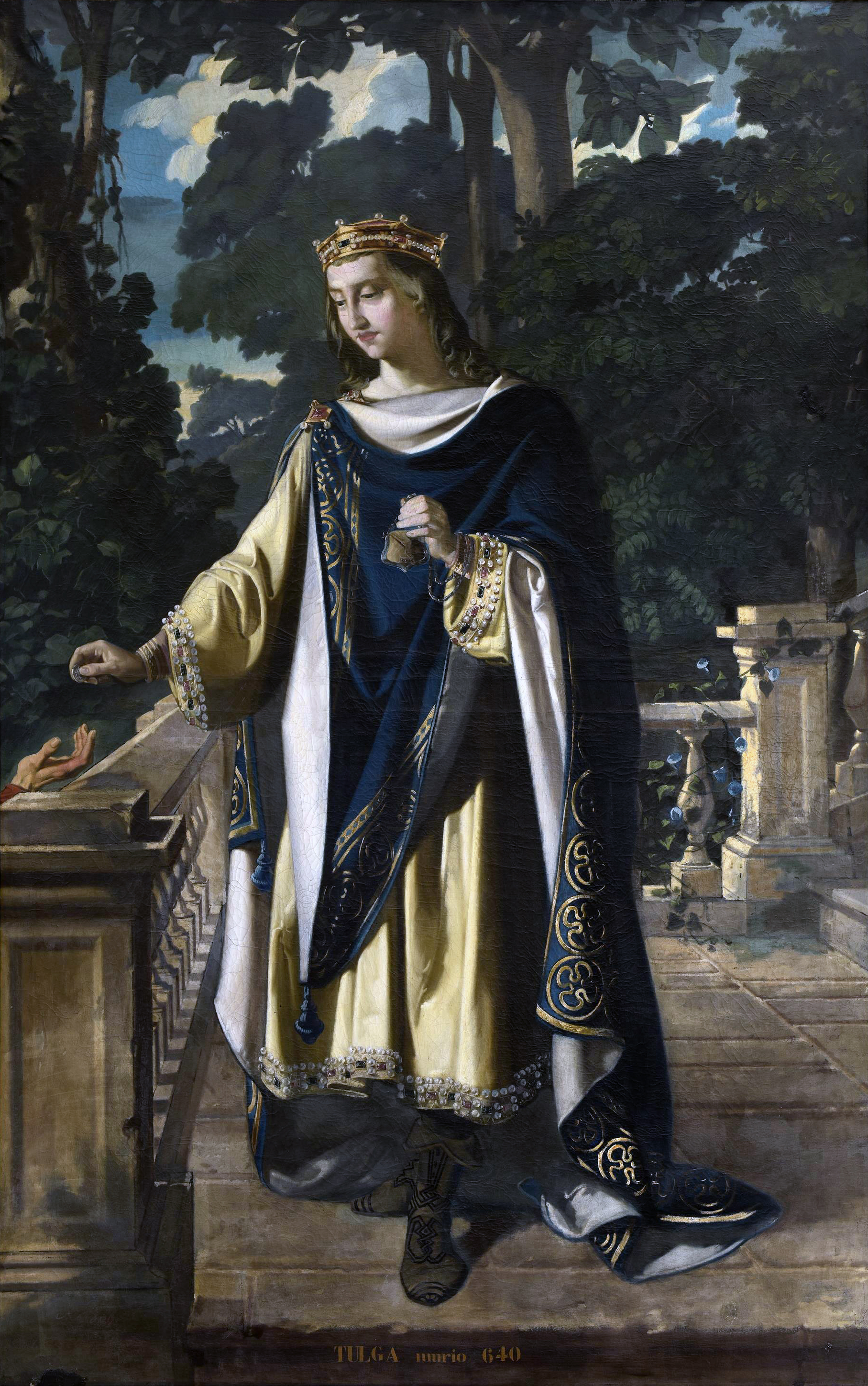
- Imaginary portrait of Tulga by Agustín Sáez Glanadell. Oil on canvas, 1854.

King of Hispania
- Reign: 20 December 639 – 17 April 642
- Predecessor: Chintila
- Successor: Chindasuinth
- Died: After 642
- Father: Chintila
- Religion: Chalcedonian Christianity

Tulga or Tulca (died in or af. 642) was Visigothic King of Hispania, Septimania and Galicia from 639, if his father died in December 639, as some sources state, to 642. Other sources have his rule beginning as early as 639 or ending as early as 641. He succeeded his father Chintila in an ultimately vain attempt to establish dynastic kingship.

== Origin ==
Tulga was the son of the Visigothic king Chintila and a queen whose name and lineage are unknown, as recorded by both the chronicler Fredegar and the Laterculus regum Visigothorum.

The Diccionario biográfico español (Real Academia de la Historia) maintains that Chintila was a descendant of a noble and powerful Visigothic family.

According to Henri Leclercq in his L'Espagne chrétienne, Chintila was the brother of his predecessor, Sisenand.

== Biography ==
In 642, Chindasuinth, a Gothic warlord, who may have been as old as 79, commenced a rebellion. He had command of the frontier with the Basques. He saw the crown's weakness, and a convention of nobles (landholding Goths) and other Gothic inhabitants at Pampalica (probably modern Pampliega) proclaimed him king without the support of the church.

According to Sigebert of Gembloux, the rebel deposed Tulga in Toledo and tonsured him, sending him to live out his days in a monastery, since monks were ineligible for the elective throne. However, Saint Ildephonsus of Toledo says that the rebellion failed without the church's support and Chindasuinth succeeded only on the death of Tulga. Modern historians consider it impossible to discern the truth.

== Bibliography ==
- El Libro de La Genealogía de Los Reyes de España
- Alonso de Cartagena, Bonifacio Palacios Martín, Biblioteca Nacional (Spain), Faustino Menéndez Pidal de Navascués. Contribuidores Bonifacio Palacios Martín, Biblioteca Nacional
- Editor Scriptorium, 1995

ISBN 84-605-2545-7, ISBN 978-84-605-2545-5

- Roger Collins, Early medieval Spain: unity in diversity, 400-1000 (New York: Palgrave Macmillan, 1995) ISBN 0-312-12662-X, 9780312126629

Regnal titles
| Preceded by Chintila | King of the Visigoths; 20 December 639 – 17 April 642 | Succeeded by Chindasuinth |
