= Argimund =

Argimund was a Visigothic usurper who briefly claimed the kingship in 589–590 before being put down by the legitimate sovereign, Reccared I.

Following Reccared's conversion from Arianism to Catholicism, a conspiracy, led by Sunna, the Arian bishop of Mérida, arose to at first place the Arian Segga on the throne but failed due to the plot being betrayed by one of its own named Witteric. But more uprisings followed & this one was no different as Argimund revolted in 589, somewhere in the Kingdom. In response, Reccared like with the rebellion of Segga a few years back, sent his General Claudius to put it down. The Revolt probably only lasted a short few months if not weeks, and Argimund was captured. Argimund probably had his hands cut off (like his predecessor) and was banished into Exile, his further fate afterwards are unknown.

== Sources ==
- Thompson, E. A. The Goths in Spain. Oxford: Clarendon Press, 1969. ISBN 0-19-814271-4.
- Collins, Roger. Visigothic Spain, 409–711. Oxford: Blackwell Publishing, 2004. ISBN 0-631-18185-7.
- Collins, Roger. "King Leovigild and the Conversion of the Visigoths." Law, Regionalism and Culture in Early Medieval Spain. Variorum, 1992. ISBN 0-86078-308-1.
