= San Román de Hornija =

Coordinates: 41°29′N 5°17′W

San Román de Hornija, Spain
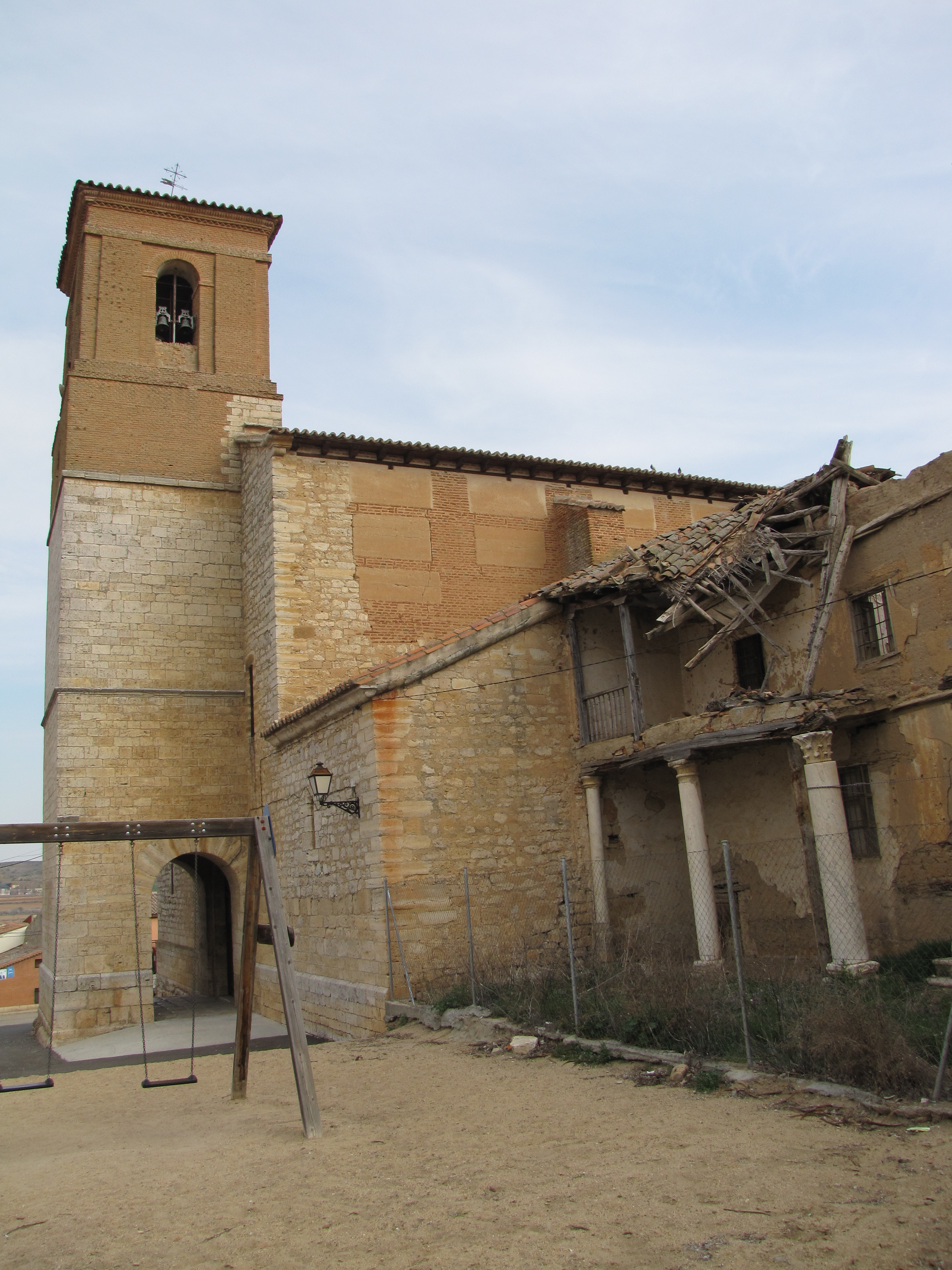

- Coat of arms
- Interactive map of San Román de Hornija, Spain
- Country: Spain
- Autonomous community: Castile and León
- Province: Valladolid
- Municipality: San Román de Hornija

Area
  - Total: 41.62 km^{2} (16.07 sq mi)
- Elevation: 672 m (2,205 ft)

Population (2025-01-01)
  - Total: 295
  - Density: 7.09/km^{2} (18.4/sq mi)
- Time zone: UTC+1 (CET)
  - Summer (DST): UTC+2 (CEST)

San Román de Hornija is a municipality located in the province of Valladolid, Castile and León, Spain. According to the 2004 census (INE), the municipality had a population of 425 inhabitants.
