= Sisenand =

Visigothic King

- King of the Visigoths
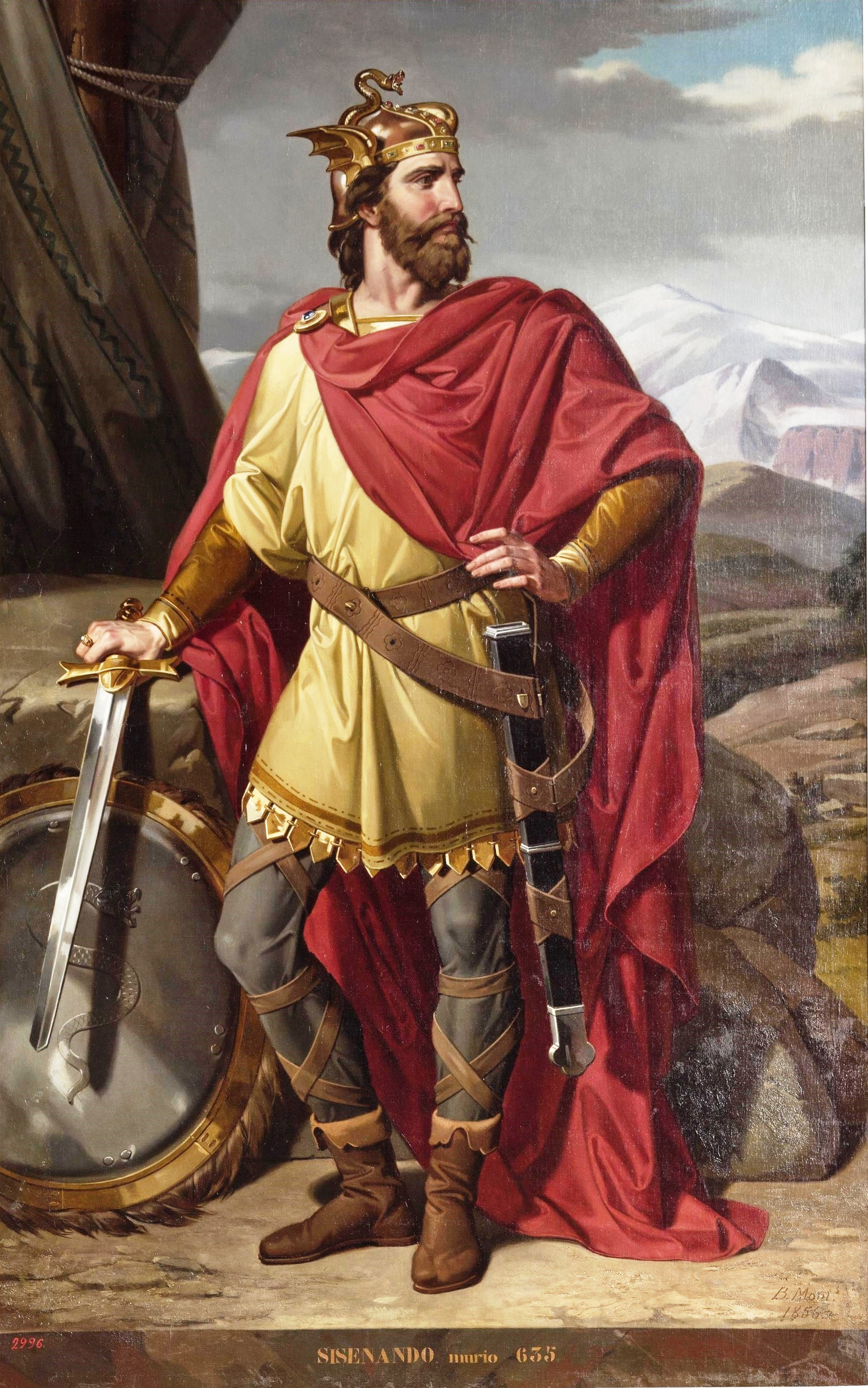
- Imaginary portrait of Sisenand, by Bernardino Montañés (oil on canvas, 1856)

King of Hispania
- Reign: 26 March 631 – 12 March 636
- Predecessor: Suintila
- Successor: Chintila
- Born: c. 605
- Died: 12 March 636 (aged 30/31)
- Religion: Chalcedonian Christianity

Sisenand (Spanish, Galician, and Portuguese: Sisenando; Latin: Sisenandus) (c. 605 – 12 March 636) was the Visigothic King of Hispania, Septimania and Galicia from 631 to 636.

== Reign ==
Sisenand was the governor of Septimania, when the nobles revolted against the Visigothic king, Suintila, over the latter's confiscations of lands and distribution of privileges between the nobility and clergy. Sisenand joined the rebellion and overthrew Suintila with the aid of Dagobert I, King of the Franks, to whom Gothic nobles offered a plate of pure gold in return, weighing 500 pounds. The plate was allegedly a gift that Aetius, a Roman general, gave to Thorismund, then king of the Visigoths, in 451. After successfully overthrowing Suintila and capturing Zaragoza on 26 March 631, Sisenand proclaimed himself king. The victory of Sisenand also represented the triumph of the nobility over the common people, although the greatest beneficiary was the clergy, who took advantage of the weariness of the other contenders to enhance their own influence.

Upon assuming the throne, he had Suintila, the previous king, declared a tyrant for his many crimes, iniquity, and accumulation of wealth at the expense of the poor; he also removed all taxes on the clergy.

Between 632 and 633, there was apparently an attempted uprising within the kingdom, led by Iudila, only attested to by two coins from Mérida and Granada bearing the inscription IUDILA REX. The revolution failed, and Iudila was later killed.

In order to obtain ecclesiastical conformity, on 8 December 633, Sisenand convened the IV Council of Toledo, which drew up civil and ecclesiastical laws within the Visigothic kingdom, including the death penalty, excommunication, and condemnation to perpetual perdition for those rebelling against the king. Similar penalties were approved for those who wished to dispense with such law of choice. However, the council did not concede any hereditary right to the king; the next king would be elected by the bishops and magnates from one of their own.

Sisenand died a natural death in the city of Toledo on 12 March 636. Chintila was chosen by the bishops to succeed him.

Regnal titles
Preceded by Suintila	King of the Visigoths; 26 March 631 – 12 March 636	Succeeded by Chintila
