= Fourth Council of Toledo =

633 AD ecumenical council held in Toledo, Spain

The Fourth Council of Toledo was held in 633. It was convened by Visigothic king Sisenand and took place at the church of Saint Leocadia in Toledo. The council regulated many matters of discipline, decreed uniformity of liturgy throughout the Visigothic kingdom and took stringent measures against baptized Jews who had relapsed into their former faith.

All the bishops of Hispania were in attendance when the council began on 5 December 633. Isidore of Seville, though elderly, probably presided over its deliberations, and was the originator of most of its enactments. The council probably expressed with tolerable accuracy the mind and influence of Isidore. The position and deference granted to the king is remarkable. The church is free and independent, yet bound in solemn allegiance to the acknowledged king: nothing is said of allegiance to the bishop of Rome.

It was at the Fourth Council of Toledo that a decree was promulgated commanding and requiring all bishops to establish seminaries in their cathedral cities, along the lines of the school associated with Isidore already existing at Seville. Within his own jurisdiction he had availed himself of the resources of education to counteract the growing influence of Gothic barbarism. His was the quickening spirit that animated the educational movement of which Seville was the centre. The study of Greek and Hebrew as well as the liberal arts, was prescribed. Interest in law and medicine was also encouraged. Through the authority of the fourth council this policy of education was made obligatory upon all the bishops of the kingdom.

The Fourth Council confirmed the value of preaching from the Book of Revelation against those who refused to do so, even requiring passages from it to be read during Easter season.

== Sources ==
- Thompson, E. A. (1969) The Goths in Spain. Oxford: Clarendon Press.
- Concilium Toletanum quartum, minutes from the Collectio Hispana Gallica Augustodunensis (Vat. lat. 1341)
