= 560s =

Decade

The 560s decade lasted from January 1, 560, to December 31, 569.

== Events ==
=== By place ===
==== Europe ====
- Alboin succeeds his father Audoin after his death, as king of the Lombards.

==== Britain ====
- Adda succeeds his brother Glappa as king of Bernicia (approximate date).
- Ælla becomes king of Deira (this according to the Anglo-Saxon Chronicle).
- Ceawlin succeeds his father Cynric as king of Wessex (approximate date).
- Custennin ap Cado abdicates as king of Dumnonia (South West England).
- Elidyr of Strathclyde invades Gwynedd (Wales) and tries to expel his brother-in-law, King Rhun ap Maelgwn.

=== By topic ===
==== Religion ====
- Columba quarrels with Finnian of Moville over authorship of a psalter, leading to a pitched battle the next year.

=== By place ===
==== Europe ====
- November 29 – King Chlothar I ("the Old") dies at Compiègne at age 64. The Merovingian dynasty is continued by his four sons (Charibert I, Guntram, Sigebert I and Chilperic I), who divide the Frankish Kingdom and rule from the capitals at Paris, Orléans, Reims and Soissons, respectively.

==== Britain ====
- The Battle of Cúl Drebene (modern Ireland) is fought between the Northern and Southern Uí Néill (approximate date).

==== Asia ====
- Winter – Wu Cheng Di succeeds his brother Xiao Zhao Di, who dies from injuries suffered while hunting, as Chinese emperor of Northern Qi.

==== Americas ====
- Sky Witness is crowned as leader of Calakmul.

=== By topic ===
==== Religion ====
- March 4 – Pope Pelagius I dies in Rome after a five-year reign, and is succeeded by John III as the 61st pope.
- Jnanagupta, a Buddhist monk from Gandhara (Pakistan), begins translating Buddhist texts into Chinese.
- The First Council of Braga is held. The council condemns the doctrine of Priscillianism.

=== By place ===
==== Byzantine Empire ====
- Emperor Justinian I signs a peace treaty with the Sasanid Empire. The status quo ante is restored, with Lazica (modern Georgia) in Byzantine hands.
- Belisarius stands trial for corruption in Constantinople, possibly with Procopius acting as praefectus urbi. He is found guilty and sent to prison.
- End of the Lazic War: In the Fifty-Year Peace Treaty, King Khosrau I recognises Lazica as a Byzantine vassal state for an annual payment of 5,000 pounds of gold each year.
- December 23 – Justinian I re-consecrates Hagia Sophia after its dome is rebuilt. Paul the Silentiary, Byzantine poet, writes an epic poem (Ekphrasis).
- The last Ostrogothic strongholds at Verona and Brixia are taken by the Byzantine Empire, ending the Gothic War.

==== Europe ====
- King Sigebert I repels an attack on Austrasia by the Avars at Regensburg (Germany). He moves his capital from Reims to Metz (approximate date).

==== Asia ====
- Spring – Xiao Ming Di, age 20, succeeds his father Xuan Di as emperor of the Chinese Liang Dynasty.
- Silla, by order of king Jinheung, wages war upon Gaya (Three Kingdoms of Korea) and conquers it.
- The secondary capital Taiyuan in Northern Qi is rebuilt and becomes a center of Buddhism.

==== Mesoamerica ====
- First Tikal-Calakmul War: The Maya state of Caracol (Belize) defeats King Wak Chan K'awiil (Double Bird) of Tikal in battle, ending his dynasty.

=== By place ===
==== Byzantine Empire ====
- Emperor Justinian I pardons Belisarius; he orders his release from prison, and restores his properties and honours. He permits the general to live in obscurity, and gives him a veterans' pension.
- The new Hagia Sophia (cost: 20,000 pounds of gold), with its numerous chapels and shrines, octagonal dome and mosaics, becomes the centre and most visible monument of Eastern Orthodoxy.

==== Europe ====
- Tauredunum event: A mountain landslide into the Rhone river destroys a fort and two villages, and creates a tsunami in Lake Geneva. The wave which reaches Lausanne is thirteen metres high, and eight metres high by the time it hits Geneva. Describing the event, Marius Aventicensis writes that the tsunami "devastated very old villages with their men and cattle, it even destroyed many sacred places", and swept away "the bridge in Geneva, windmills and men".

=== By topic ===
==== Religion ====
- Columba, Irish missionary monk, travels to Scotland with twelve companions. He lands on the Kintyre Peninsula, near Southend, and begins his evangelising mission to the Picts. On the island of Iona, he founds a monastery (Iona Abbey) on the west coast in the Inner Hebrides.

=== By place ===
==== Britain ====
- Cadoc, abbot of Llancarfan (Wales), settles in Weedon and is made bishop (approximate date).
- August 22 – Columba reports seeing the Loch Ness Monster at the River Ness (according to the "Life of St. Columba").

==== Mesoamerica ====
- Tulum, Maya walled city, on the Yucatán Peninsula (modern Mexico) is first mentioned on a stele inscription.

=== By topic ===
==== Religion ====
- Samson of Dol, one of seven founder saints of Brittany, attends a council in Paris and witnesses several royal decrees (approximate date).

=== By place ===
==== Byzantine Empire ====
- November 15 – Justin II succeeds his uncle Justinian I as emperor of the Byzantine Empire. He begins his reign by refusing subsidies to the Avars, who conduct several large-scale raids through the Balkan Peninsula.
- Justin II recalls his cousin Justin (pretender to the throne) to Constantinople; after accusations against him, he is placed under house arrest.
- Justin II sends his son-in-law Baduarius (magister militum) with a Byzantine army, to support the Gepids in their war against the Lombards.
- The Madaba Map is made in the Byzantine church of Saint George. The floor mosaic contains the depiction of the Holy Land (approximate date).

==== Britain ====
- Columba, an Irish missionary, spots the Loch Ness Monster on the River Ness (in present day Scotland) and saves the life of a Pict (approximate date).

==== Europe ====
- Summer – A war erupts between Alboin, the king of the Lombards, and King Cunimund, the leader of the Gepids. (approximate date).

==== Asia ====
- Gao Wei succeeds his father Wu Cheng Di as ruler of the Chinese Northern Qi Dynasty. Wu Cheng Di becomes a regent and Grand Emperor.
- The Uyghurs are defeated by the Göktürks, who expand their territory in Central Asia (approximate date).

==== Central America ====
- February 6 – Kʼan Joy Chitam I, ruler of the Mayan city-state of Palenque, in what is now the state of Chiapas in southern Mexico, dies after a reign of exactly 36 years.
- May 2 – Ahkal Moʼ Nahb II becomes the new ruler of Palenque and reigns until his death in 570.

=== By topic ===
==== Arts and sciences ====
- Agathias begins to write a history, beginning where Procopius finished his work.

==== Religion ====
- January 22 – Patriarch Eutychius of Constantinople is deposed as Ecumenical Patriarch of Constantinople by Justinian I after he refuses the Byzantine Emperor's order to adopt the tenets of the Aphthartodocetae, a sect of Monophysites. From April 12 he is replaced by John Scholasticus.
- Columba begins preaching in the Orkney Islands (approximate date).

=== By place ===
==== Byzantine Empire ====
- A Byzantine army, under command of Baduarius, assists the Gepids in their war against the Lombards. The Byzantines win the first battle in the lower Danube (Moesia), but Gepid King Cunimund refuses to hand back the fortress city of Sirmium (modern Serbia), as he had promised.
- Emperor Justin II, facing an empty treasury, breaks the treaty with the Gepids that has existed since 565. King Alboin of the Lombards makes an alliance with the Avars under Bayan I, at the expense of tough conditions. They demand a tenth of the Lombards' cattle and half of the war booty.
- Justin II sends his cousin Justin to exile in Alexandria, where he is installed as Augustal prefect of Egypt. There he is murdered in his sleep, and his head is cut off and brought to Constantinople (most likely by assignment of Empress Sophia).

==== Europe ====
- Ainmuire mac Sétnai becomes High King of Ireland, and rules from 566–569 (this according to the Book of Leinster).

==== Francia ====
- A poet from Italy named Venantius Fortunatus arrives at the Merovingian court at Metz. With a strong grasp of traditional Roman poetry, Fortunatus impresses and entertains the Frankish royalty and aristocracy. The success of a Latin poet in Francia suggests that Roman culture persisted well after the Roman Empire disintegrated in Gaul in the late 5th century.

==== Asia ====
- Fei Di, age 12, succeeds his father Wen Di, as emperor of the Chinese Chen dynasty. He honors his grand-aunt Zhang Yao'er with the title of Grand Empress, and she becomes his regent.
- Kirtivarman I succeeds his father Pulakeshin I as king of the Chalukya dynasty (India). During his rule he completes the subjugation of the Kadambas and annexes the port of Goa.

==== Unidentified ====
- A major volcanic eruption occurs in the Antarctic.

=== By place ===
==== Europe ====
- The Lombard–Gepid War (567) ends with a Lombard-Avar victory, and the annihilation of the Gepids.
- Sigebert I, king of Austrasia, marries Brunhilda, and his half brother Chilperic I marries Galswintha, both daughters of the Visigothic king Athanagild.
- King Charibert I dies without an heir; his realm (region Neustria and Aquitaine) is divided between his brothers Guntram, Sigebert I and Chilperic I.
- Liuva I succeeds his predecessor Athanagild, after an interregnum of five months, and becomes king of the Visigoths.

==== China ====
- Three Disasters of Wu: Emperor Wu Di of the Northern Zhou dynasty initiates the second persecution of Buddhists in China. This persecution continues until he is succeeded by his son Emperor Xuan.

=== By topic ===
==== Religion ====
- The Second Council of Tours is held. It decrees that any cleric found in bed with his wife will be excommunicated.
- John III, patriarch of Constantinople, organizes a compromise between the Chalcedonians and Monophysites.

=== By place ===
==== Europe ====
- Spring – The Lombards, led by King Alboin, cross the Julian Alps. Their invasion of Northern Italy is almost unopposed; withered Byzantine forces, that remain in the Po Valley and are based at Ravenna, are no match for the overwhelming Lombard incursion. Residents of the Italian countryside flee at the Lombards' approach. Some retreat to the barrier islands along the shore of the Northern Adriatic Sea, where they establish permanent settlements: the nascent city of Venice.
- The Byzantines abandon present-day Lombardy and Tuscany, to establish a frontier march in the hills south of Ravenna (still known as Le Marche). Bavarians, Sarmatians, Saxons and Taifali, join the invasion en route. As they advance, the vacuum left behind them on the Balkan Peninsula is filled by Avars, Bulgars and Slavs.
- Sigebert I, king of Austrasia, repels a second attack from the Avars. His half brother Chilperic I strangles his wife Galswintha at the instigation of his mistress Fredegund.
- Liuvigild is declared co-king and heir after the second year of the reign of his brother Liuva I. He becomes ruler over the Visigoths in Hispania Citerior (Eastern Spain).
- Mummolus, Gallo-Roman prefect, defeats the Lombards at Embrun and expels them from Provence (Southern Gaul).
- The Avar Khaganate attempts to expel Kutrigurs who had fled the Göktürks, ordering them to go south of the Sava River; those who leave generally fall under rule of the Turks.

==== Britain ====
- Æthelric succeeds his brother Adda as king of Bernicia (modern Scotland). He rules from 568–572 (approximate date).
- Battle of Wibbandun: Ceawlin of Wessex defeats Æthelberht of Kent (according to the Anglo-Saxon Chronicle).

==== Asia ====
- The Turks and Sassanids succeed in destroying the Hepthalites on the eastern frontier (approximate date).
- A Turkish khan sends emissaries to the Byzantine Empire (approximate date).

=== By topic ===
==== Religion ====
- Emperor Justin II and his wife Sophia send the Cross of Justin II ("Vatican Cross") to Rome, to improve the relations with the Byzantine Empire.
- Paulinus I, patriarch of Aquileia, flees with the treasures of his church and transfers them to the island of Grado.

=== By place ===
==== Byzantine Empire ====
- Emperor Justin II and his wife Sophia send a relic of the "True Cross" to the Frankish princess Radegund, who has founded a monastery at Poitiers.
- The Garamantian Kingdom (modern Libya) signs a peace treaty with the Byzantine Empire. The capital city of Garama is converted to Christianity.

==== Europe ====
- September – The Lombards conquer Forum Iulii (Cividale del Friuli) in northeastern Italy. Later in the year, the Lombards conquer Milan.
- Gisulf I, nephew of Alboin, is appointed as the first duke of Friuli (approximate date).

==== Arabia ====
- Al-Mundhir III succeeds his father Al-Harith V and becomes king of the Ghassanids.

=== By topic ===
==== Religion ====
- The Nubian kingdom of Alodia is converted to Christianity by Byzantine missionaries (according to John of Ephesus).
- John of Ephesus completes his "Biographies of Eastern Saints" (approximate date).
- November 19 – In Poitiers the "Vexilla Regis" is first sung during the Procession.

== Births ==
560

- Abu Sufyan ibn Harb, Arabic leader (d. 652)
- Constantina, Byzantine empress (approximate date)
- Eustace of Luxeuil, abbot (approximate date)
- Isidore of Seville, archbishop and scholar
- Richarius, Frankish hermit and monk (approximate date)
- Sophronius, patriarch of Jerusalem (d. 638)
- Tassilo I, duke of Bavaria (d. 610)

561

- Yang Lihua, empress of Northern Zhou (d. 609)

563

- Andreas of Caesarea, bishop and writer (d. 637)
- Chindasuinth, king of the Visigoths (d. 653)

564

- Hermenegild, Visigoth prince (approximate date)
- Li Baiyao, Chinese official and historian (d. 647)

565

- Chen Yueyi, empress of Northern Zhou (approximate date)
- Cuthwine, prince of Wessex (approximate date)
- Gundoald, Bavarian nobleman (approximate date)
- Marutha of Tikrit, Persian theologian (d. 649)
- Mirin, Irish monk and missionary (approximate date)
- Sisebut, king of the Visigoths (approximate date)
- Witteric, king of the Visigoths (approximate date)
- Yuan Leshang, empress of Northern Zhou

566

- Abbas ibn Abd al-Muttalib, uncle of Muhammad (approximate date)
- Li Yuan, Emperor Gaozu of the Tang dynasty (d. 635)
- Xiao, empress of the Sui dynasty (approximate date)
- Yuchi Chifan, empress of Northern Zhou (d. 595)

567

- Ingund, wife of Hermenegild (or 568)

568

- Feng Deyi, chancellor of the Tang dynasty (d. 627)
- Ingund, princess, spouse of Visigoth prince Hermenegild (d. 584)
- Liu Wenjing, chancellor of the Tang dynasty (d. 619)

569

- Yángdi, emperor of the Sui dynasty (d. 618)
- Muhammad, Prophet of Islam

== Deaths ==
560

- Aspasius of Auch, bishop of Éauze
- Audoin, king of the Lombards (approximate date)
- Chen Chang, prince of the Chen dynasty (b. 537)
- Clodoald, Merovingian prince (approximate date) (b. 522)
- Cynric, king of Wessex
- Domitian of Huy, Frankish bishop and saint
- Dorotheus of Gaza, monk and abbot (approximate date)
- Glappa, king of Bernicia (approximate date)
- Ming Di, emperor of Northern Zhou (b. 534)
- Thurisind, king of the Gepids (approximate date)
- Yang Yin, official of Northern Qi (b. 511)

561

- March 4 – Pope Pelagius I
- November 29 – Chlothar I, king of the Franks
- Chram, Frankish prince and son of Chlothar I
- Fei Di, emperor of Northern Qi (b. 545)
- Xiao Zhao Di, emperor of Northern Qi (b. 535)

562

- Dowager Cao, concubine of Xuan Di
- Dowager Gong, empress mother of Xuan Di
- Procopius, Byzantine historian (approximate date)
- Xuan Di, emperor of the Liang Dynasty (b. 519)

563

- January –Cutzinas, Berber chieftain
- Hou Andu, general of the Chen dynasty (b. 520)
- Wang, empress of the Liang dynasty

564

- Gao Bainian, crown prince of Northern Qi (b. 556)
- Laisrén mac Nad Froích, Irish monk and saint
- Petroc, Celtic prince and saint (approximate date)
- Tudwal, Breton monk and saint (approximate date)

565

- November 14 – Justinian I, emperor of the Byzantine Empire
- Audoin, king of the Lombards (approximate date)
- Belisarius, Byzantine general ("Last of the Romans")
- Diarmait mac Cerbaill, High King (approximate date)
- Imru' al-Qais, was a pre-Islamic Arabian poet and last King of Kinda
- Procopius, Byzantine historian (approximate date)
- Samson of Dol, bishop and saint (approximate date)

566

- Domnall Ilchelgach, High King of Ireland
- Forggus mac Muirchertaig, High King
- Justin, Byzantine aristocrat and general
- Pulakeshin I, king of the Chalukya dynasty (India)
- Wen Di, emperor of the Chen dynasty (b. 522)

567

- June 5 – Theodosius I, patriarch of Alexandria
- Athanagild, king of the Visigoths
- Charibert I, king of the Franks
- Cissa, king of the South Saxons
- Cunimund, king of the Gepids

568

- Adda, king of Bernicia (approximate date)
- Galswintha, queen consort of Neustria, married to Chilperic I (b. 540)

569

- Ainmuire mac Sétnai, High King of Ireland
- Al-Harith ibn Jabalah, king of the Ghassanids
- Peter IV, Coptic Orthodox patriarch of Alexandria
- Wu Cheng Di, emperor of Northern Qi (b. 537)
