= 567 =

Calendar year

567 in various calendars
- Gregorian calendar: 567; DLXVII
- Ab urbe condita: 1320
- Armenian calendar: 16; ԹՎ ԺԶ
- Assyrian calendar: 5317
- Balinese saka calendar: 488–489
- Bengali calendar: −27 – −26
- Berber calendar: 1517
- Buddhist calendar: 1111
- Burmese calendar: −71
- Byzantine calendar: 6075–6076
- Chinese calendar: 丙戌年 (Fire Dog); 3264 or 3057 — to — 丁亥年 (Fire Pig); 3265 or 3058
- Coptic calendar: 283–284
- Discordian calendar: 1733
- Ethiopian calendar: 559–560
- Hebrew calendar: 4327–4328
- Hindu calendars
- Vikram Samvat: 623–624
- Shaka Samvat: 488–489
- Kali Yuga: 3667–3668
- Holocene calendar: 10567
- Iranian calendar: 55 BP – 54 BP
- Islamic calendar: 57 BH – 56 BH
- Javanese calendar: 455–456
- Julian calendar: 567; DLXVII
- Korean calendar: 2900
- Minguo calendar: 1345 before ROC 民前1345年
- Nanakshahi calendar: −901
- Seleucid era: 878/879 AG
- Thai solar calendar: 1109–1110
- Tibetan calendar: མེ་ཕོ་ཁྱི་ལོ་ (male Fire-Dog); 693 or 312 or −460 — to — མེ་མོ་ཕག་ལོ་ (female Fire-Boar); 694 or 313 or −459

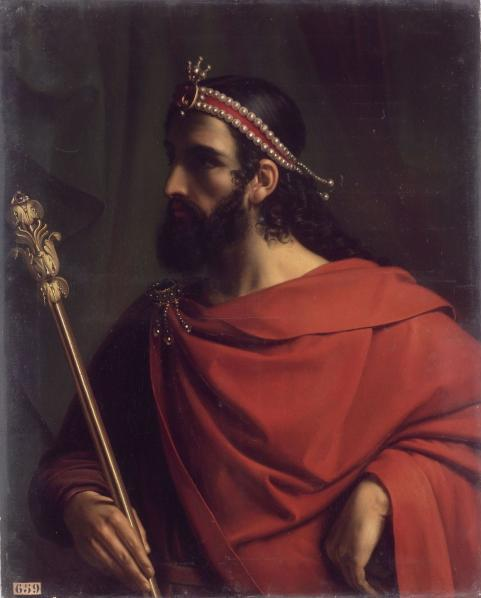
King Charibert I (c. 517–567)

Year 567 (DLXVII) was a common year starting on Saturday of the Julian calendar. The denomination 567 for this year has been used since the early medieval period, when the Anno Domini calendar era became the prevalent method in Europe for naming years.

== Events ==
=== By place ===
==== Europe ====
- The Lombard–Gepid War (567) ends with a Lombard-Avar victory, and the annihilation of the Gepids.
- Sigebert I, king of Austrasia, marries Brunhilda, and his half brother Chilperic I marries Galswintha, both daughters of the Visigothic king Athanagild.
- King Charibert I dies without an heir; his realm (region Neustria and Aquitaine) is divided between his brothers Guntram, Sigebert I and Chilperic I.
- Liuva I succeeds his predecessor Athanagild, after an interregnum of five months, and becomes king of the Visigoths.

==== China ====
- Three Disasters of Wu: Emperor Wu Di of the Northern Zhou dynasty initiates the second persecution of Buddhists in China. This persecution continues until he is succeeded by his son Emperor Xuan.

=== By topic ===
==== Religion ====
- The Second Council of Tours is held. It decrees that any cleric found in bed with his wife will be excommunicated.
- John III, patriarch of Constantinople, organizes a compromise between the Chalcedonians and Monophysites.

== Births ==
- Ingund, wife of Hermenegild (or 568)

== Deaths ==
- June 5 – Theodosius I, patriarch of Alexandria
- Athanagild, king of the Visigoths
- Charibert I, king of the Franks
- Cissa, king of the South Saxons
- Cunimund, king of the Gepids
