= 568 =

Calendar year

568 in various calendars
- Gregorian calendar: 568; DLXVIII
- Ab urbe condita: 1321
- Armenian calendar: 17; ԹՎ ԺԷ
- Assyrian calendar: 5318
- Balinese saka calendar: 489–490
- Bengali calendar: −26 – −25
- Berber calendar: 1518
- Buddhist calendar: 1112
- Burmese calendar: −70
- Byzantine calendar: 6076–6077
- Chinese calendar: 丁亥年 (Fire Pig); 3265 or 3058 — to — 戊子年 (Earth Rat); 3266 or 3059
- Coptic calendar: 284–285
- Discordian calendar: 1734
- Ethiopian calendar: 560–561
- Hebrew calendar: 4328–4329
- Hindu calendars
- Vikram Samvat: 624–625
- Shaka Samvat: 489–490
- Kali Yuga: 3668–3669
- Holocene calendar: 10568
- Iranian calendar: 54 BP – 53 BP
- Islamic calendar: 56 BH – 55 BH
- Javanese calendar: 456–457
- Julian calendar: 568; DLXVIII
- Korean calendar: 2901
- Minguo calendar: 1344 before ROC 民前1344年
- Nanakshahi calendar: −900
- Seleucid era: 879/880 AG
- Thai solar calendar: 1110–1111
- Tibetan calendar: མེ་མོ་ཕག་ལོ་ (female Fire-Boar); 694 or 313 or −459 — to — ས་ཕོ་བྱི་བ་ལོ་ (male Earth-Rat); 695 or 314 or −458

Year 568 (DLXVIII) was a leap year starting on Sunday of the Julian calendar. The denomination 568 for this year has been used since the early medieval period, when the Anno Domini calendar era became the prevalent method in Europe for naming years.

== Events ==
=== By place ===
==== Europe ====
- Spring – The Lombards, led by King Alboin, cross the Julian Alps. Their invasion of Northern Italy is almost unopposed; withered Byzantine forces, that remain in the Po Valley and are based at Ravenna, are no match for the overwhelming Lombard incursion. Residents of the Italian countryside flee at the Lombards' approach. Some retreat to the barrier islands along the shore of the Northern Adriatic Sea, where they establish permanent settlements: the nascent city of Venice.
- The Byzantines abandon present-day Lombardy and Tuscany, to establish a frontier march in the hills south of Ravenna (still known as Le Marche). Bavarians, Sarmatians, Saxons and Taifali, join the invasion en route. As they advance, the vacuum left behind them on the Balkan Peninsula is filled by Avars, Bulgars and Slavs.
- Sigebert I, king of Austrasia, repels a second attack from the Avars. His half brother Chilperic I strangles his wife Galswintha at the instigation of his mistress Fredegund.
- Liuvigild is declared co-king and heir after the second year of the reign of his brother Liuva I. He becomes ruler over the Visigoths in Hispania Citerior (Eastern Spain).
- Mummolus, Gallo-Roman prefect, defeats the Lombards at Embrun and expels them from Provence (Southern Gaul).
- The Avar Khaganate attempts to expel Kutrigurs who had fled the Göktürks, ordering them to go south of the Sava River; those who leave generally fall under rule of the Turks.

==== Britain ====
- Æthelric succeeds his brother Adda as king of Bernicia (modern Scotland). He rules from 568–572 (approximate date).
- Battle of Wibbandun: Ceawlin of Wessex defeats Æthelberht of Kent (according to the Anglo-Saxon Chronicle).

==== Asia ====
- The Turks and Sassanids succeed in destroying the Hepthalites on the eastern frontier (approximate date).
- A Turkish khan sends emissaries to the Byzantine Empire (approximate date).

=== By topic ===
==== Religion ====
- Emperor Justin II and his wife Sophia send the Cross of Justin II ("Vatican Cross") to Rome, to improve the relations with the Byzantine Empire.
- Paulinus I, patriarch of Aquileia, flees with the treasures of his church and transfers them to the island of Grado.

== Births ==
- Feng Deyi, chancellor of the Tang dynasty (d. 627)
- Ingund, princess, spouse of Visigoth prince Hermenegild (d. 584)
- Liu Wenjing, chancellor of the Tang dynasty (d. 619)

== Deaths ==
- Adda, king of Bernicia (approximate date)
- Galswintha, queen consort of Neustria, married to Chilperic I (b. 540)
