= List of Visigothic queens =

The names of only a few of the queens of the Visigoths are known. As the Gothic monarchy was elective, all queens were such only as consorts of their husbands.

In his Chronicon John of Biclarum styles Goisuintha "queen" (regina) under the years 579 and 589. The wife of Reccared I subscribed to the canons of the Third Council of Toledo as "I, Baddo, glorious queen" (ego Baddo, gloriosa regina). There are at least three published studies on queenship among the Visigoths.

== List of queens ==
- Aelia Galla Placidia, wife of Ataulf (414–15 [1 yr])
- Flavia Valiana, wife of Theodoric I (418–51 [33 yrs])
- Ragnagild (Ragnachildis), wife of Euric (466–84 [18 yrs])
- Theodegotha, wife of Alaric II (494–507 [13 yrs])
- Clotilde (Chrodechildis), wife of Amalaric (511/26–31 [5-20 yrs])
- Goisuintha (Goiswintha), wife of Athanagild (554–67 [13 yrs])
- Theodosia of Cartagena, first wife of Liuvigild (568–86 [18 yrs])
- Goisuintha (Goiswintha), second time, second wife of Liuvigild
- Ingund (Ingunda), wife of Hermenegild (580–85 [5 yrs]), married 579
- Baddo (Bauda), wife of Reccared I (580–601 [21 yrs]), predeceased him
- Hildoara, wife of Gundemar (610–12 [2 yrs])
- Theodora, wife of Suintila (621–31 [10 yrs])
- Recciberga, wife of Chindasuinth (642–53 [11 yrs])
- Liuvigoto, wife of Erwig (680–87 [7 yrs])
- Cixilo, wife of Egica (687–702 [15-32 yrs]), married 670, but repudiated late 687
- Egilona, wife of Roderic (710–11/2 [1-2 yrs])

== Bibliography ==
- José Orlandis Rovira, "La reina en la monarquía visigoda", Anuario de Historia del Derecho Español 27–8 (1957–58): 109–35.
- E. García Zueco, "Una aproximación a la figura de la Reina visigoda", Memorana, II (1998).
- Amancio Isla Frez, "Reinas de los godos", Hispania 64 (2004).
