= Goiswintha =

- Queen consort of the Visigoths
- Born: c. 520s
- Died: 588
- Spouse: Athanagild; Liuvigild
- Issue: Brunhilda of Austrasia; Galswintha, Queen of Neustria

Goiswintha or Goisuintha (died 588) was a Visigothic queen consort of Hispania and Septimania. She was the wife of two kings, Athanagild and Liuvigild. The Visigothic Kingdom during the late 6th century was going through a period of political and religious transformation. Located on the Iberian Peninsula, the kingdom incorporated many Roman traditions, laws, and religious practices as much of their population was Catholic, while the ruling elite were still Arian Christian. As queen, Goiswintha played a crucial role in the religious conflicts between Arians and Catholics. Goiswintha's actions, including her resistance to the Catholic conversion of her family members and her involvement in politics, reflected the religious transformation that happened in her time. Goiswintha’s fervent push to keep Arianism in the limelight in her kingdom would lead to a major rebellion led by her stepson, Hermenegild. She would also lead a conspiracy against her other stepson, Reccared, which would lead to the end of her life. These events would be the end of the religious war against Arians and Nicene Christianity.

Historians have debated about the Visigothic Kingdom and their contributions to the fall of Rome claiming that the Visigoths and other goths were actively involved. According to Peter Heather in his 2006 book, The Fall of the Roman Empire, Heather argues that there could have been no fall of Rome without the barbarians. This led to the rise of gothic kingdoms throughout Rome, including the Visigoths. However, Walter Goffart in his 2006 book Barbarian Tides: The Migration Age and the Later Roman Empire, argues that the fall of Rome was due to a transformation of the empire that was unable to transform because of internal conflicts. He also states that the argument of barbarians overthrowing the Roman Empire is "deeply flawed". Gaffart does make the claim that barbarians were present in Rome and had a major impact, but they could not have been the sole reason for the collapse. Goiswintha existed as a bastion of this anti-Roman (what Romans would have seen as barbarian) identity.

== Biography ==
Goiswintha was initially the wife of Athanagild (r.554-567). From this marriage, she was the mother of two daughters — Brunhilda and Galswintha — who were married to two Merovingian brother-kings: Sigebert I of Austrasia and Chilperic, king of the Neustrian Franks. Athanagild died in 567 and was succeeded by King Liuva. Liuva died prematurly in 571 or 573, and was succeeded by King Liuvigild, who then married Goiswintha for political status. After this marriage, Goiswintha became step-mother to Hermenegild and Reccared, King Liuvigild's sons from a previous, unknown wife.

Goiswintha was an influential personality in the royal court. In 579, her stepson Hermenegild married her granddaughter Ingund, daughter of Goiswintha's daughter Brunhilda by the Frankish king Sigebert I. As Queen, it fell to Goiswintha to welcome the young bride to court, and reportedly Goiswintha was at first very kind to the young princess. However, she was determined that Ingund should be re-baptized in the Arian faith. Ingund firmly refused. According to Gregory of Tours: "the Queen lost her temper completely" and "seized the girl by her hair and threw her to the ground: then she kicked her until she was covered with blood, had her stripped naked and ordered her to be thrown into the baptismal pool".

Gregory of Tours provides the only physical description of Goiswintha. He says she had a cataract that physically reflected that "her eye-lids lost the sense which had long before departed from her mind". Though this is the only written description ever given, it should be understood more as a reflection of Gregory of Tours’ opinion of her rather than a completely verifiable physical attribute.

== Rebellion ==
In Toledo, Hermenegild was influenced by his wife, Ingund, and Leander of Seville, to convert to Catholicism in 579. It was also in 579 that Goiswintha and a faction loyal to her would encourage Hermenegild to rebel against King Liuvigild in Seville. John of Biclaro describes this rebellion as originating as a domestic quarrel, and developing into open revolt that caused "greater destruction in the province of Spain–to Goths and Romans alike–than any attack by external enemies." Whether Hermenegild was reacting to her violence towards Hermenegild’s wife, Ingund, or if Goiswintha was seeking the establishment of a separate monarchy in the south for the heirs of her first husband, Athanagild is unclear. However, it is unknown if Goiswintha and Hermenegild were actually working together. Though his revolt was ultimately unsuccessful and he would be defeated and killed in 585, it is unknown the reason he was killed. It is seen as unlikely that Liuvigild was not somehow involved, however some suspicion has been cast on his second son, Reccared.

Gregory of Tours describes this revolt much differently. In his description, Goiswintha was the primary agitator of the revolt. He describes what could be considered an attempt at a genocide of the Catholics in Spain: "Many of them were driven into exile, deprived of their possessions, weakened by hunger, thrown into prison, beaten with sticks and tortured to death." It was in this revolt that Goiswintha attempted to violently convert her granddaughter to Arianism. It was then after this, that Ingund encouraged her husband, Hermenegild, to convert to Catholicism and resist Goiswintha’s violence militarily, first with Roman backing, then with Greek backing. However, Gregory’s description is less than trustworthy as he was not present in Spain, and consistently writes with bias against Arians.

Following Liuvigild's death in 586, his younger son Reccared became king. His reign has been seen as a turning point in the fortunes of the Visigothic monarchy. He also promised to keep Goiswintha in her position on the court and to treat her like a motherly figure and promised her safety. While Reccared was in control of the kingdom, he converted to Catholicism during the Third Council of Toledo. The Council took time to come together but it finally met on May 8 with many Arian bishops renouncing their former beliefs and signing the acts of the council with the other Catholic bishops. This was a major turning point for the kingdom and Iberian Peninsula as it marked the kingdom's conversion from Arian Christianity to Catholicism. After the events of the Council, everyday life in the Peninsula did not have a huge effect on the majority of the population and was seen as an easy conversion because most of the population's identity was already Catholic. Public life in the Visigothic Kingdom became more religiously unified. The Church became a bigger part of the community, and cultural norms changed. While most people saw little change in daily routines, their faith in God was finally recognized by the elite. This new unity helped bring together the ruling elite in a Christian context and bring in Roman traditions.

In the later part of 588, a conspiracy against Reccared was headed by queen dowager Goiswintha together with the Arian bishop Uldila, but they were detected, and the bishop was banished. John of Biclaro claims that this conspiracy was the bishop Uldila and Goiswintha taking the Catholic communion, but rejecting it in secret. After this, he writes tunc terminum dedit, which is generally translated as "she came to the end of her life at this time", which has led to the question of whether he meant murder, suicide, or execution. However, this could also be read as "she gave up her end at this time", and thus understood as John of Biclaro’s euphemistic way of saying she committed suicide.
