= 584 =

Calendar year

584 in various calendars
- Gregorian calendar: 584; DLXXXIV
- Ab urbe condita: 1337
- Armenian calendar: 33; ԹՎ ԼԳ
- Assyrian calendar: 5334
- Balinese saka calendar: 505–506
- Bengali calendar: −10 – −9
- Berber calendar: 1534
- Buddhist calendar: 1128
- Burmese calendar: −54
- Byzantine calendar: 6092–6093
- Chinese calendar: 癸卯年 (Water Rabbit); 3281 or 3074 — to — 甲辰年 (Wood Dragon); 3282 or 3075
- Coptic calendar: 300–301
- Discordian calendar: 1750
- Ethiopian calendar: 576–577
- Hebrew calendar: 4344–4345
- Hindu calendars
- Vikram Samvat: 640–641
- Shaka Samvat: 505–506
- Kali Yuga: 3684–3685
- Holocene calendar: 10584
- Iranian calendar: 38 BP – 37 BP
- Islamic calendar: 39 BH – 38 BH
- Javanese calendar: 473–474
- Julian calendar: 584; DLXXXIV
- Korean calendar: 2917
- Minguo calendar: 1328 before ROC 民前1328年
- Nanakshahi calendar: −884
- Seleucid era: 895/896 AG
- Thai solar calendar: 1126–1127
- Tibetan calendar: ཆུ་མོ་ཡོས་ལོ་ (female Water-Hare); 710 or 329 or −443 — to — ཤིང་ཕོ་འབྲུག་ལོ་ (male Wood-Dragon); 711 or 330 or −442

The Exarchate of Ravenna (orange) in 584

Year 584 (DLXXXIV) was a leap year starting on Saturday of the Julian calendar. The denomination 584 for this year has been used since the early medieval period, when the Anno Domini calendar era became the prevalent method in Europe for naming years.

== Events ==
=== By place ===
==== Europe ====
- September – King Chilperic I is stabbed to death while returning from a hunt near Chelles, after a 23-year reign over a territory extending from Aquitaine, to the northern seacoast of what later will be France. His wife Fredegund, who has paid for his assassination, seizes his wealth, flees to Paris with her son Chlothar II, and persuades the nobles to accept him as legitimate heir while she serves as regent, continuing her power struggles with Guntram, king of Burgundy, and her sister Brunhilda, queen mother of Austrasia.
- The Lombards re-establish a unified monarchy after a 10-year interregnum (Rule of the Dukes). Threatened by a Frankish invasion that the dukes have provoked, they elect Authari (son of Cleph) as their king and give him the capital of Pavia (Northern Italy).
- The Visigoths under King Liuvigild capture the city of Seville, after a siege of nearly 2 years. His rebellious son Hermenegild seeks refuge in a church at Córdoba, but is arrested and banished to Tarragona. His wife Inguld flees with her son to Africa.
- The Exarchate of Ravenna is founded, and organised into a group of duchies, mainly coastal cities on the Italian Peninsula. The civil and military head of these Byzantine territories is the exarch (governor) in Ravenna.
- The Slavs push south on the Balkan Peninsula – partly in conjunction with the Avars under their ruler (khagan) Bayan I – ravaging the cities Athens and Corinth, and threatening the Long Walls of Constantinople.
- King Eboric is deposed by his mother (second husband Andeca) who becomes the new ruler of the Kingdom of Galicia (Northern Spain) and the Suevi.
- Gundoald, illegitimate son of Chlothar I, tries to expend his territory from Brive-la-Gaillarde (Burgundy) and proclaims himself king (approximate date).

==== Britain ====
- Battle of Fethanleigh: King Ceawlin of Wessex is defeated by the Britons. He ravages the surrounding countryside in revenge (approximate date).

==== Asia ====
- Emperor Wéndi of the Sui dynasty organises the Grand Canal. He builds ships for transportation and grain stores are located at strategic points.

== Births ==
- Amand, bishop and saint (approximate date)
- Chlothar II, king of the Franks (d. 629)
- Yang Zhao, prince of the Sui dynasty (d. 606)

== Deaths ==
- April 15 – Ruadhán of Lorrha, Irish abbot and saint
- Chilperic I, king of Neustria (or Soissons)
- Deiniol, bishop of Bangor (Wales)
- Ingund, wife of Visigoth prince Hermenegild
- Maurus, Roman abbot and saint (b. 512)
- Approximate date – Bridei I, king of the Picts
