= Chlodoswintha =

Chlodoswintha (also Chlodosuinth, Chlodosind, Chlodosinda, Chlothsinda or Chlothsind) may refer to:

- Chlothsind (queen), daughter of the Frankish king Chlothar I and wife of the Lombard king Alboin
- Chlodosinda (daughter of Sigebert I), Frankish princess betrothed to the Lombard king Authari and the Visigothic king Reccared
