= 525 =

Calendar year

525 in various calendars
Gregorian calendar	525; DXXV
Ab urbe condita	1278
Assyrian calendar	5275
Balinese saka calendar	446–447
Bengali calendar	−69 – −68
Berber calendar	1475
Buddhist calendar	1069
Burmese calendar	−113
Byzantine calendar	6033–6034
Chinese calendar	甲辰年 (Wood Dragon); 3222 or 3015 — to — 乙巳年 (Wood Snake); 3223 or 3016
Coptic calendar	241–242
Discordian calendar	1691
Ethiopian calendar	517–518
Hebrew calendar	4285–4286
- Hindu calendars
Vikram Samvat	581–582
Shaka Samvat	446–447
Kali Yuga	3625–3626
Holocene calendar	10525
Iranian calendar	97 BP – 96 BP
Islamic calendar	100 BH – 99 BH
Javanese calendar	412–413
Julian calendar	525; DXXV
Korean calendar	2858
Minguo calendar	1387 before ROC 民前1387年
Nanakshahi calendar	−943
Seleucid era	836/837 AG
Thai solar calendar	1067–1068
Tibetan calendar	ཤིང་ཕོ་འབྲུག་ལོ་ (male Wood-Dragon); 651 or 270 or −502 — to — ཤིང་མོ་སྦྲུལ་ལོ་ (female Wood-Snake); 652 or 271 or −501

Year 525 (DXXV) was a common year starting on Wednesday of the Julian calendar. At the time, it was known as the Year of the Consulship of Probus and Philoxenus (or, less frequently, year 1278 Ab urbe condita). The denomination 525 for this year has been used since the early medieval period, when the Anno Domini calendar era became the prevalent method in Europe for naming years. In this year, the monk Dionysius Exiguus proposed a calendar starting with the birth of Jesus (the AD system), so this was the first time the year was designated AD. However, the system was not used in general until the reign of Charlemagne in the 9th century.

== Events ==
=== By place ===
==== Byzantine Empire ====
- Emperor Justin I rebuilds the city of Anazarbus (modern Turkey) and renames it "Justinopolis".

==== Britannia ====
- Bernicia (North East England) is settled by the Angles (approximate date).

==== Europe ====
- King Theodoric the Great sends Pope John I to Constantinople, to negotiate a withdrawal of Byzantine emperor Justin's edict against Arian Christianity.
- Frankish tribesmen, under the command of King Chlothar I, plunder Burgundy.

==== Africa ====
- Kaleb, king of Aksum, collects a fleet and crosses from Africa to conquer Yemen. He establishes better trade ports on the Red Sea.

==== Asia ====
- The Daisan river, tributary of the Euphrates, floods Edessa, and within a couple of hours fills the entire city except for the highest parts. Eventually the pent-up waters break through the city walls. The Shroud of Turin is allegedly discovered during the rebuilding of the city (see Image of Edessa).

=== By topic ===
==== Exploration and colonization ====
- Cosmas Indicopleustes, Alexandrian explorer-geographer, travels up the Nile. He will venture as far to the east as Ceylon, become a monk, and write "Topographia Christiana" to vindicate the biblical account of the world (see 550).

==== Religion ====
- Dionysius Exiguus, Scythian theologian-mathematician, inaugurates the practice of using A.D. (Anno Domini) in Rome for calendar dates after the birth of Jesus Christ, a system which has been supported by subsequent studies. Dionysius also produces his tables for computing the date of "Cyclus Paschalis" (Easter Tables).
- The Arian baptistery of Santa Maria is built in Ripa (Rome).
- Buddhist caves are completed at Ajanta (India) with stone carvings (approximate date).

== Births ==
- Alexander of Tralles, physician (approximate date)
- Pope Benedict I, Pope of Catholic church (d. 579)
- John Climacus, monk and writer (approximate date)
- Justin, Byzantine aristocrat and general (d. 566)
- Liuvigild, king of the Visigoths (d. 586)
- Wideok, king of Baekje (Three Kingdoms of Korea)
- Yujiulü, empress of Western Wei (d. 540)

== Deaths ==
- Boethius, Roman philosopher and writer (or 524)
- Yuan Cha, high official of Northern Wei (approximate date)
- Yūsuf Dhū Nuwas, king of the Himyarite Kingdom (Yemen).
