= Liuva =

Liuva may refer to:

- Liuva I (died c. 572), Visigothic King
- Liuva II, Visigothic King of Hispania, Septimania and Galicia from 601 to 603
- Liuva (died c. 680), bishop of Braga, Portugal
