= 540 =

Calendar year

540 in various calendars
- Gregorian calendar: 540; DXL
- Ab urbe condita: 1293
- Assyrian calendar: 5290
- Balinese saka calendar: 461–462
- Bengali calendar: −54 – −53
- Berber calendar: 1490
- Buddhist calendar: 1084
- Burmese calendar: −98
- Byzantine calendar: 6048–6049
- Chinese calendar: 己未年 (Earth Goat); 3237 or 3030 — to — 庚申年 (Metal Monkey); 3238 or 3031
- Coptic calendar: 256–257
- Discordian calendar: 1706
- Ethiopian calendar: 532–533
- Hebrew calendar: 4300–4301
- Hindu calendars
- Vikram Samvat: 596–597
- Shaka Samvat: 461–462
- Kali Yuga: 3640–3641
- Holocene calendar: 10540
- Iranian calendar: 82 BP – 81 BP
- Islamic calendar: 85 BH – 84 BH
- Javanese calendar: 427–428
- Julian calendar: 540; DXL
- Korean calendar: 2873
- Minguo calendar: 1372 before ROC 民前1372年
- Nanakshahi calendar: −928
- Seleucid era: 851/852 AG
- Thai solar calendar: 1082–1083
- Tibetan calendar: ས་མོ་ལུག་ལོ་ (female Earth-Sheep); 666 or 285 or −487 — to — ལྕགས་ཕོ་སྤྲེ་ལོ་ (male Iron-Monkey); 667 or 286 or −486

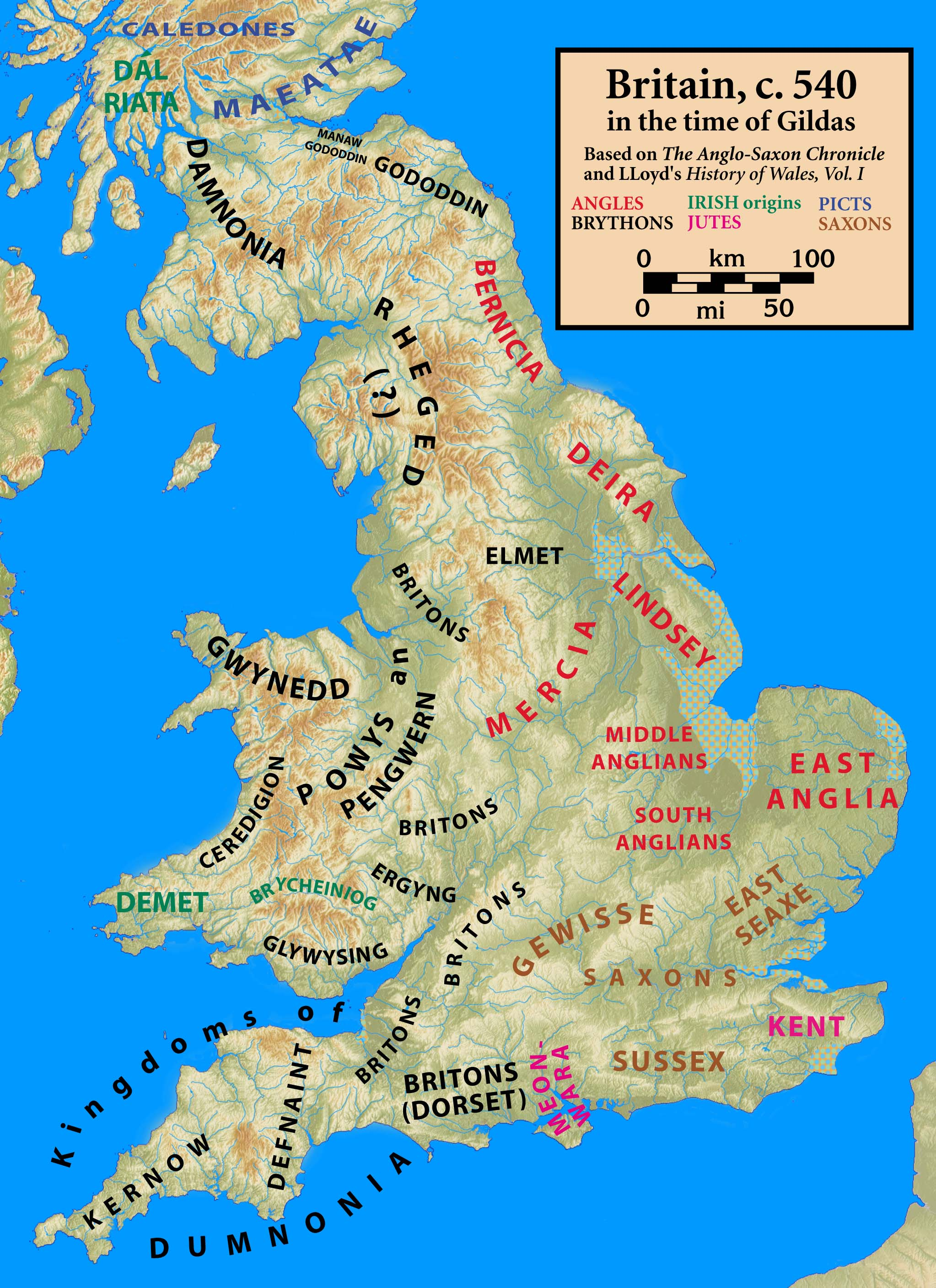
Britain in the time of Gildas (c. 540)

Year 540 (DXL) was a leap year starting on Sunday of the Julian calendar. In the Roman Empire, it was known as the Year of the Consulship of Iustinus without colleague (or, less frequently, year 1293 Ab urbe condita). The denomination 540 for this year has been used since the early medieval period, when the Anno Domini calendar era became the prevalent method in Europe for naming years.

== Events ==
=== By place ===
==== Byzantine Empire ====
- Emperor Justinian I offers to make peace with Vitiges, but Belisarius refuses to transmit the message. The Ostrogoths then offer to support Belisarius as emperor of the West.
- May – Gothic War: Belisarius conquers Mediolanum (modern-day Milan) and the Gothic capital Ravenna. Vitiges and his wife Matasuntha are taken as captives to Constantinople.
- Belisarius consolidates Italy and begins mopping-up operations, capturing the Gothic fortifications. The cities Ticinum and Verona north of River Po remain in Gothic hands.
- Ildibad succeeds Vitiges as king of the Ostrogoths, and installs his nephew Totila as commander of the Gothic army. He recaptures Venetia and Liguria in Northern Italy.

==== Europe ====
- King Custennin ap Cado is deposed, and returns to Dumnonia in the south-west of Great Britain.

==== Persia ====
- King Khosrow I breaks the "Eternal Peace" treaty with the Byzantine Empire after eight years. Responding to an embassy from the Ostrogoths urging action against Emperor Justinian I's expanding power, he leads the Persian army up the River Euphrates. Extracting tributes from towns along the way, Khosrau I besieges and captures Antioch. He plunders the city extensively, transporting valuable artworks, including marble statues and mosaics, back to Persia.

==== Africa ====
- Solomon captures the Aurès Mountains from the Moors and extends Byzantine authority over Numidia and Mauretania Sitifensis. The city of Theveste (Algeria) is restored and fortified.

==== Asia ====
- Jinheung becomes king of the Korean kingdom of Silla.

=== By topic ===
==== Religion ====
- Cassiodorus, former Roman statesman, establishes a monastery at his estate in Italy. The Vivarium "monastery school" is for highly educated and sophisticated men, who copy sacred and secular manuscripts, intending for this to be their sole occupation (approximate date).
- Pope Vigilius rejects Monophysitism in letters to Justinian I and patriarch Menas of Constantinople.
- Benedict of Nursia writes his monastic rules, containing precepts for his monks (approximate date).

==== World ====
- Global environmental cooling occurs, due either to a comet impact or volcanic eruption in Central America, evidenced by global tree ring growth diminution. Recent evidence from Swiss ice core points to volcanic eruptions in Iceland. Historical evidence records this earlier as the Extreme weather events of 535–536.

== Births ==
- October 12 – Yōmei, emperor of Japan (d. 587)
- Authari, king of the Lombards (approximate date)
- Columbanus, Irish missionary (or 543)
- Galswintha, Neustrian queen, married to Chilperic I (d. 568)
- Garibald I, duke of Bavaria (d. 591)
- Pope Gregory I ("the Great") (d. 604)
- John of Biclaro, Visigoth chronicler (approximate date)
- Myrddin Wyllt, Welsh legend (approximate date)

== Deaths ==
- Dignāga, Buddhist founder of Indian logic
- Dionysius Exiguus (approximate date)
- Fridolin of Säckingen Irish missionary
- Vedast, Frankish bishop
- Vitiges, king of the Ostrogoths
- Yifu, empress of Western Wei (b. 510)
- Yujiulü, empress of Western Wei (b. 525)
