= Clotilde (died 531) =

Queen Consort of the Visigoths
- Reign: c. 526 – 531
- Born: c. 500
- Died: 531
- Burial: Paris
- Spouse: Amalaric (526–531)

Clotilde (or Chrodechildis) (c. 500–531) was the daughter of King Clovis I of the Franks and Queen Clotilde. She became the queen of the Visigothic King Amalaric. Born around 500, she was the favored child of her parents and was deeply affected by her father's death in 511.

Clotilde wed Amalaric around 526, and the initial ties between their families were positive. While Clotilde was Catholic, Amalaric and the Visigoths practiced Arianism. She steadfastly held onto her own religious beliefs, refusing to adopt her husband's faith, and she shared her plight with her family, describing the persecution she faced due to her faith. This tension led to Amalaric's expulsion from Narbonne. Subsequently, a conflict erupted in 531 between her brother, King Childebert I, and her husband, at Barcelona, Spain. According to Isidore of Seville, Amalaric faced defeat and was ultimately assassinated by his own men, while Clotilde embarked on a journey to Francia with the Frankish army, but she died en route. The circumstances of her death remain unrecorded. Childebert I brought her body to Paris for burial, an event that deeply saddened her mother and siblings.
