= Ingund (wife of Hermenegild) =

Eldest child of Sigebert I, king of Austrasia

- Queen consort of the Visigoths
- Born: 567/568; Metz
- Died: c. 585; Carthage
- Spouse: Hermenegild
- House: Merovingian
- Father: Sigebert I
- Mother: Brunhilda of Hispania
- Religion: Catholic

Ingunde, Ingund, Ingundis or Ingunda (born in 567/568), was the eldest child of Sigebert I, king of Austrasia, and his wife Brunhilda, daughter of King Athanagild of the Visigoths. She married Hermenegild and became the first Catholic queen of the Visigoths.

== Early life ==
Ingund's father Sigebert became ruler of the Frankish kingdom of Austrasia in 561 on the death of his father Chlothar I.

Following the tradition of the time, it would follow that Ingund was named after her father's mother. Her siblings included a sister, Chlodosind (born about 569) and a brother Childebert (born 570).

In 575, Sigebert was embroiled in a civil war with his half-brother, Chilperic I, king of Neustria. On the verge of victory, Sigebert was assassinated. With the death of Sigebert, Brunhilda and the children were in great fear for their safety. Childebert, only five years old, faced almost certain death from Chilperic. Duke Gundovald immediately came to Paris, where Brunhilda and the children were living, took possession of Childebert and secured his safety among the Austrasian nobility. When Chilperic came to Paris, he seized Brunhilda and ordered Ingund and Chlodosind to be held in custody in the monastery of Meaux. Ingund would have been only seven or eight during this traumatic time.

== Marriage of Hermenegild and Ingund ==
Map showing Baetica and Lusitania

In 569 Leovigild was elevated to co-rule the Visigoths in Hispania and Septimania with his brother Liuva. Soon afterwards, in order to legitimize his kingship, he married Goiswintha, widow of the previous Visigothic King Athanagild and mother of Brunhilda. Leovigild had two sons, Hermenegild and Reccared, from a previous marriage. About 578 Leovigild negotiated the marriage of his eldest son Hermenegild to Ingund, daughter of Brunhilda now regent for her son Childebert.

Ingund travelled from France to Toledo through Septimania, the part of Gaul still held by the Visigoths. Septimania stretches from the eastern end of the Pyrenees, along the Mediterranean, to the Rhone. As Ingund passed through the Visigothic town of Agde she met the local Catholic bishop, Phronimius, who warned her not to accept the 'poison' of Arianism.

In 579 Prince Hermenegild married Ingund, he being an Arian and she a Catholic. At first Ingund was warmly received by Queen Goiswintha. However, the queen was determined that Ingund should be re-baptized in the Arian faith. Ingund, still only twelve, firmly refused. According to Gregory of Tours: "the Queen lost her temper completely" and "seized the girl by her hair and threw her to the ground: then she kicked her until she was covered with blood, had her stripped naked and ordered her to be thrown into the baptismal pool". Whether because of this fracas, or, more likely, because of Leovigild's desire to assure the succession of his sons (consistent with his previous actions to associate his sons with himself as rulers of the kingdom), he sent Hermenegild and Ingund to Seville to rule a portion of his kingdom—presumably the province of Baetica and southern Lusitania.

== Revolt of Hermenegild ==
It was at Seville that Ingund came into contact with Leander, a Catholic monk. Leander belonged to an elite and influential family of Hispano-Roman stock. His two brothers later became bishops and his sister an Abbess. The vast majority of the population of southern Spain was Hispano-Roman and Catholic. Also a significant segment of the Visigoth nobility were Catholic, not to mention that portion of the nobility whose roots were Hispano-Roman. Leander either was already bishop of Seville when Hermenegild and Ingund arrived there, or became bishop soon afterwards. There can be no doubt of the influence the bishop held, nor can there be any doubt that he saw in this Catholic princess an opportunity to advance the Catholic cause, for the history of this period contains numerous examples (real or mythical) of queens influencing their husband's religious conversion.

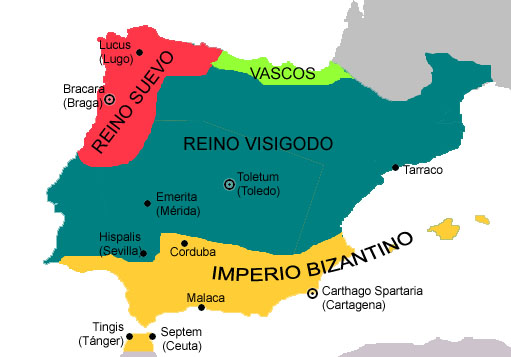
Map showing Byzantine Spain c. 580

Hermenegild's Baetica bordered Spania, the Byzantine-controlled cities of southeastern Spain. These cities were predominantly Latin Christian.

The sixth century experienced a flight of Catholic clergy to southern Spain, many from Africa, but other areas as well. Persecution and the Three-Chapter Controversy would account for much of the flight. Examples of the new arrivals are the African Nanctus, Donatus and the Greek named Paul. So when Hermenegild and Ingund arrived in Seville, they would have been met by a strong and possibly active Catholic party.

In the winter of 579–80 Hermenegild proclaimed himself king at Seville and, yet, he continued to also refer to his father as 'King'. Whether or not Hermenegild held the Orthodox Christian belief in the Trinity at this time cannot be known, for it is not till 582 that he "officially" accepted the Catholic faith. However, from the beginning, he seems to have been supported by those who support the Catholic cause. For already in 580 Leander travelled to Constantinople to plead the rebels' cause and seek aid from the Byzantine Empire.

Sometime between 580 and 582 Hermenegild and Ingund had a son named Athanagild after his matrilineal great-grandfather king Athanagild.

== Leovigild's response ==
Leander travelled to Constantinople to gain support from Emperor Tiberius in 580, returning in 582. Hermenegild converted to Catholicism in 582—as Leander was absent in the years prior, it would follow that Ingund was a major influence for his conversion.

Leovigild more or less ignored his son's transgression until 582 when he marched on Mérida and captured the city. It is difficult to determine whether this was because of Hermenegild's new found Catholicism or a coincidence. Nevertheless, Leovigild saw in Arianism Visigothic identity and any threat to this identity as a threat to Visigoth legitimacy to rule. He viewed Catholicism as the 'Roman' religion and Arianism as the Visigoth religion. Leovigild's response may have been primarily a reaction to Hermenegild and other Visigoth nobles who had, at one time or another, converted to Catholicism.

By 584 the revolt had decidedly turned against Hermenegild and its outcome became all too clear. Ingund and with their young son Athanagild tried to seek refuge in Constantinople after Hermenegild's execution, but it was refused while they were already in Sicily. The Byzantines later refused to turn them over to Leovigild. On her way to Constantinople with her son Athanagild, Ingund died (584) in Carthage, in Africa, and was buried there. The cause of her early death is not recorded, but one of the world's greatest plagues ravaged the Mediterranean at this time. Athanagild survived the journey to the Byzantine capital of Constantinople where he may have been brought up by Emperor Maurice.

The Byzantines used their custody of Ingund and her son to induce Ingund's brother, King Childebert II, to attack the Lombards of northern Italy. Childebert, while only fourteen years of age at this time, would have also been much influenced by his strong-willed mother Brunhilda, who was also committed to securing Ingund and her grandson.

Leovigild besieged Seville for a year before he was able to capture the city in 584. The tenacity of the resistance is evidence of the support for this Catholic usurper. Convinced that resistance was now futile, Hermenegild surrendered to his father. Hermenegild was imprisoned at Tarragona and repeatedly urged to abjure Catholicism. He refused and was executed by Duke Sigisbert on 13 April 585.

== Aftermath ==
According to Gregory of Tours, Ingund's example deeply influenced her husband's acceptance of Catholicism and eventual conversion. Used as evidence that the conversion was not solely based on political expediency is the fact that when Hermenegild was forced to choose between denying his Catholic faith and execution, he chose to remain Catholic. The revolt of Hermenegild signalled the weakening influence of the Arian doctrine in Spain.

Soon after the death of Hermenegild and Ingund, King Leovigild died and was succeeded by Reccared, Hermenegild's younger brother. By the second year of his reign, Reccared embraced Catholicism and began the task of unifying the Spanish people under a single religion. The spirit of Ingund and the example of Hermenegild is believed to have had an influence on Spanish society, and particularly on the new king Reccared. Reccared's lack of support for his father's actions against Hermenegild and the retribution he took on his brother's executioner is evidence of a bond between the two brothers. Pope Gregory's words further confirm Hermenegild's influence: "Reccared, following not his faithless father but his martyr brother, was converted from the perverseness of the Arian heresy."

== Parentage ==
According to the 9th-century Chronicle of Alfonso III, Erwig was the son of Ardabast, who had journeyed from the Byzantine Empire to Hispania during the time of Chindasuinth, and married Chindasuinth's niece Goda. Ardabast (or Artavasdos), was probably an Armenian or Persian Christian exile in Constantinople or in Byzantine Africa. In Hispania he was made a count.

17th-century Spanish genealogist Luis Bartolomé de Salazar y Castro gave Ardabast's father as Athanagild, the son of Saint Hermenegild and Ingund, and his mother as Flavia Juliana, a daughter of Peter Augustus and niece of the Emperor Maurice. This imperial connection is disputed by Christian Settipani, who says that the only source for Athanagild's marriage to Flavia Julia is José Pellicer, who he claims to be a forger.

== Sources ==
- Collins, Roger Early Medieval Spain: Unity in Diversity, 400-1000 Second Edition. New York: St. Martin's Press
- Thompson, E.A. The Goths in Spain. Oxford: Clarendon Press, 1969
- Treadgold, Warren T. A History of the Byzantine State and Society. Stanford: Stanford University Press, 1997
- Gibbon, Edward, The History of the Decline and Fall of the Roman Empire Volume IV. London: The Folio Society
- Gregory of Tours, The History of the Franks, England: Penguin Books Ltd. 1974
