= Chlodosinda (daughter of Sigebert I) =

Frankish princess

Chlodosinda (or Chlodosuinda; born c. 571-575) was a Frankish princess, the daughter of King Sigebert I (r. 561–575) and Queen Brunhilda.

Chlodosinda's life is known from the Ten Books of History to Gregory of Tours. At the time of her father's assassination, she was living with her mother in Paris. She was subsequently placed in custody in Meaux by her uncle, King Chilperic I. With her mother and brother, Childebert II, she came to Trier in 587 to join her other uncle, King Guntram.

Chlodosinda was twice betrothed by her brother to foreign monarchs. She was first betrothed to Authari, king of the Lombards, who was at war with the Byzantine Empire. Since the Byzantines were seeking an alliance with Childebert, Authari sought to ally with him first. The negotiations fell through. In 588, Chlodosinda was betrothed to Reccared, king of the Visigoths. Although Guntram, who had taken Chlodosinda under his protection in the Treaty of Andelot in 587, was at odds with the Visigoths, he approved the marriage. Nevertheless, it did not take place.

Chlodosinda may have later married a Burgundian nobleman named Chrodoald, if she is the unnamed paternal aunt (amita) of King Theudebert II mentioned in Jonas of Bobbio's Life of Columban.
