= Brunhilda of Austrasia =

Brunhilda

Queen consort of Austrasia
- Tenure: 567 – December 575
- Born: c. 543; Toledo
- Died: 613 (aged 69–70)
- Spouse: Sigebert I of Austrasia; Merovech
- Issue: Ingund; Chlodosinda; Childebert II
- Father: Athanagild
- Mother: Goiswintha

Brunhilda (c. 543 – 613) was queen consort of Austrasia, part of Francia, by marriage to the Merovingian king Sigebert I of Austrasia, and regent for her son, grandson and great-grandson.

In her long and complicated career she ruled the eastern Frankish kingdoms of Austrasia and Burgundy for three periods as regent for her son Childebert II from 575 until 583; her grandsons Theudebert II and Theuderic II from 595 until 599; and her great-grandson Sigebert II in 613. The period was marked by tension between the royal house and the powerful nobles vying for power.

Brunhilda was apparently an efficient ruler, but this and her forceful personality brought her into conflict with her nobles, the church, and the other Merovingians. Her history is marked by a bitter feud with the former slave Fredegund, mistress and later wife of Chilperic I of Neustria. Fredegund is said to have murdered or ordered the murder of Brunhilda's sister, Queen Galswintha (c. 568), to make herself queen. This event launched the 45-year feud which would eventually see Fredegund order the murder of Brunhilda's husband, and even have Brunhilda imprisoned for a time. Even after Fredegund's death in 597, the feud was continued by her son, Chlothar II, who in 613 defeated Brunhilda in battle and had her pulled apart by four horses.

== Life ==
Brunhilda was possibly born about 543 in the Visigothic capital of Toledo, the younger of the two daughters of Athanagild and Goiswintha. She was only eleven years old when her father was made king in 554. She was educated in Toledo as an Arian Christian.

=== First marriage ===
In 567, she was married to King Sigebert I of Austrasia, a grandson of Clovis I, who had sent an embassy to Toledo loaded with gifts. She joined him at Metz. Upon their marriage, she converted to Catholicism. Sigebert's father, Chlothar I, had reunited the four kingdoms of the Franks, but when he died, Sigebert and his three brothers divided them again. According to historian and bishop Gregory of Tours, Sigebert's marriage to a Visigothic princess was a criticism of his brothers' choices in wives. Instead of marrying a low-born woman, Sigebert chose a princess of education and morals.

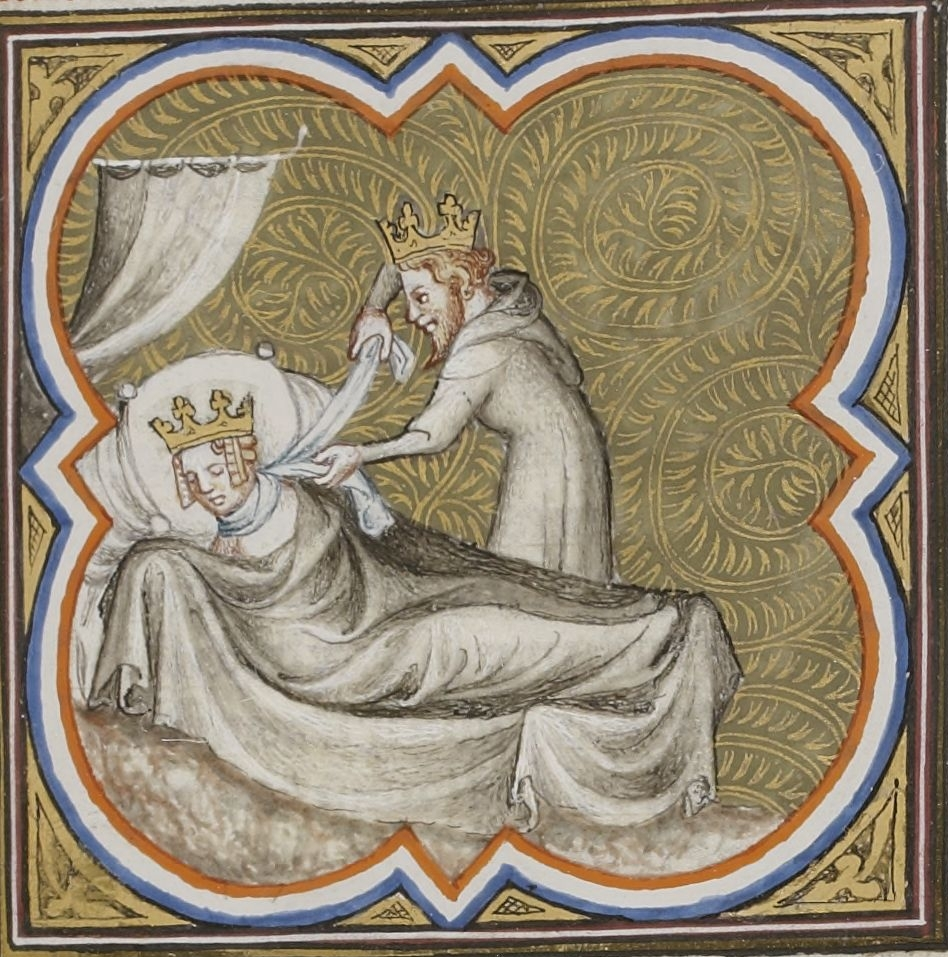
The strangling of Queen Galswintha by Chilperic I.

In response to Sigebert's noble marriage, his brother, Chilperic I of Neustria, sent for Brunhilda's sister, Galswintha. Gregory of Tours suggests that he proposed because he envied his brother's marriage to Brunhilda; Galswintha ordered him to purge his court of courtesans and mistresses and he soon grew tired of her. He and his favourite mistress, Fredegund, conspired to murder her. In 568, an unknown assailant strangled Galswintha while she slept in her bed and Chilperic married Fredegund.

Brunhilda so detested Fredegund for the death of her sister—and this hatred was so fiercely reciprocated—that the two queens persuaded their husbands to go to war. Sigebert persuaded their other brother, the elder Guntram of Burgundy, to mediate the dispute between the queens. He decided that Galswintha's dower of Bordeaux, Limoges, Cahors, Béarn and Bigorre should be turned over to Brunhilda in restitution. Chilperic did not easily give up the cities and Brunhilda did not forget the murder. Bishop Germain of Paris negotiated a brief peace between them. Between 567 and 570, Brunhilda bore Sigebert three children: Ingund, Chlodosind and Childebert.

The peace was then broken by Chilperic, who invaded Sigebert's dominions. Sigebert defeated Chilperic, who fled to Tournai. The people of Paris hailed Sigebert as a conqueror when he arrived with Brunhilda and their children. Bishop Germain wrote to Brunhilda, asking her to persuade her husband to restore the peace and to spare his brother. Chroniclers of his life say that she ignored this; certainly Sigebert set out to besiege Tournai. Fredegund responded to this threat to her husband by hiring two assassins, who killed Sigebert at Vitry-en-Artois with poisoned daggers (scramsaxi, according to Gregory). Brunhilda was captured and imprisoned at Rouen.

=== Second marriage ===
Merovech, the son of Chilperic and his first wife Audovera, went to Rouen on pretext of visiting his mother. While there, he decided to marry the widowed Brunhilda and thus strengthen his chances of becoming a king. His stepmother, Fredegund, was determined that only her sons should succeed as kings and eliminated her husband's sons by other women. Merovech and Brunhilda were married by the Bishop of Rouen, Praetextatus. However, since Brunhilda was Merovech's aunt the marriage was contrary to canon law.

Chilperic soon besieged them in the church of St Martin on the walls. Eventually he made peace with them, but he took Merovech away with him to Soissons. In an effort to nullify the marriage, Chilperic had Merovech tonsured and sent to the monastery of Le Mans to become a priest. Merovech fled to the sanctuary of St Martin at Tours, which was Gregory's church (who was thus an eyewitness to these events), and later to Champagne. He finally returned to Tours in 578 and when his bid for power failed, he asked his servant to kill him.

=== First regency ===
Brunhilda now tried to seize the regency of Austrasia in the name of her son Childebert II, but she was resisted fiercely by her nobles and had to retire briefly to the court of Guntram of Burgundy before obtaining her goal. At that time, she ruled Austrasia as regent. Not being a fighter, she was primarily an administrative reformer, with a Visigothic education. She repaired the old Roman roads, built many churches and abbeys, constructed the necessary fortresses, reorganised the royal finances, and restructured the royal army. However, she antagonised the nobles by her continued imposition of royal authority wherever it was lax. To reinforce her positions and the crown's prestige and power, she convinced Guntram, newly heirless, to adopt Childebert as his own son and heir. This he did in 577. In 579, she married her daughter Ingunda, then only thirteen, to the Visigothic prince Hermenegild, allying her house to that of the king of her native land. However, Hermenegild converted to Catholicism and he and his wife both died in the ensuing religious wars which tore apart the Visigothic kingdom in Spain. Brunhilda ruled Austrasia until Childebert came of age in 583, at the traditional Merovingian majority of thirteen.

=== Relations with King Guntram ===
The conflict with Fredegund flared up once more upon the death of Chilperic. Now in the regency in Neustria, Fredegund was in a position to renew the war with her old enemy. Simultaneously, Brunhilda had to deal with her own internal enemies. Many of the dukes strongly opposed her influence over her son Childebert, the king. Three of them—Rauching, Ursio and Berthefrid—conspired to assassinate Childebert; however, their plot was found out. Rauching was killed and Ursio and Berthefrid fled to a fortress. Upon this, Guntram immediately begged for Childebert, Brunhilda and Childebert's two sons to take refuge at his court. This they did and soon Ursio and Berthefrid were killed. In 587, Guntram, Childebert and Brunhilda settled the Pact of Andelot securing for Childebert the Burgundian succession and a continuing alliance of the two realms of Austrasia and Burgundy for the rest of Guntram's life.

In that same year, King Reccared I of the Visigoths sent embassies to both Childebert and Guntram, the former accepting them and consolidating an alliance and the latter refusing to see them. Thus, when Brunhilda and Childebert negotiated a marriage for the king's sister Chlodosind with the king of Spain, it was rejected by Guntram and abandoned. In 592, Guntram died and Childebert, per the treaty, succeeded to his kingdom, immediately making war on Clotaire II of Neustria, Chilperic's son by Fredegund. Under Fredegund's leadership, Brunhilda's troops were routed in the 593 Battle of Droizy. Childebert died in 596 at the age of twenty-six.

=== Second regency ===
Upon Childebert's death, Brunhilda attempted to govern Austrasia and Burgundy in the name of her grandsons Theudebert II and Theuderic II. Theudebert became king of Austrasia, and Theuderic, king of Burgundy. Though she attributed the death of Childebert to Fredegund, the latter died in 597 and the direct conflict between her and Brunhilda ended. Peace would elude the Franks, however, for many years more as the conflict raged between the two queens' descendants.

In 599, Brunhilda's elder grandson, Theudebert, at whose court she was staying, exiled her. She was found wandering near Arcis in Champagne by a peasant, who brought her to Theuderic. The peasant was rewarded with the bishopric of Auxerre, as the legend goes. Theuderic welcomed her and readily fell under her influence, which was now inclined to vengeance against Theudebert. Soon the brothers were at war.

It is at this point that Brunhilda, now in her later fifties and having survived all the previous tribulations, began to display that ruthlessness which led to her especially violent demise. Brunhilda first took Protadius as lover and, desiring to promote him to high office, conspired to have Berthoald, the mayor of the palace, killed. In 604, she convinced Theuderic to send Berthoald to inspect the royal villae along the Seine. Clotaire, in accordance with Brunhilda's bidding, sent his own mayor Landric (a former paramour of Fredegund) to meet Berthoald, who had only a small contingent of men with him. Realising that he had been the victim of courtly plotting, Berthoald, in the ensuing confrontation, overchased the enemy until he was surrounded and killed. Protadius was promptly put in his place.

Brunhilda and Protadius soon persuaded Theuderic to return to war with Theudebert, but the mayor was murdered by his warriors, who did not wish to fight to assuage the ego of the queen. The man who ordered Protadius' execution, Duke Uncelen, was soon arrested by Brunhilda and tortured and executed. He was not the first ducal victim of the queen's vengeance.

It was also during these later regencies that Desiderius, Bishop of Vienne (later Saint Didier), publicly accused her of incest and cruelty. Desiderius finally enraged her with a pointed sermon on chastity preached in 612 before her and Theuderic, with whom she then hired three assassins to murder the bishop at the village now-called Saint-Didier-sur-Chalaronne.

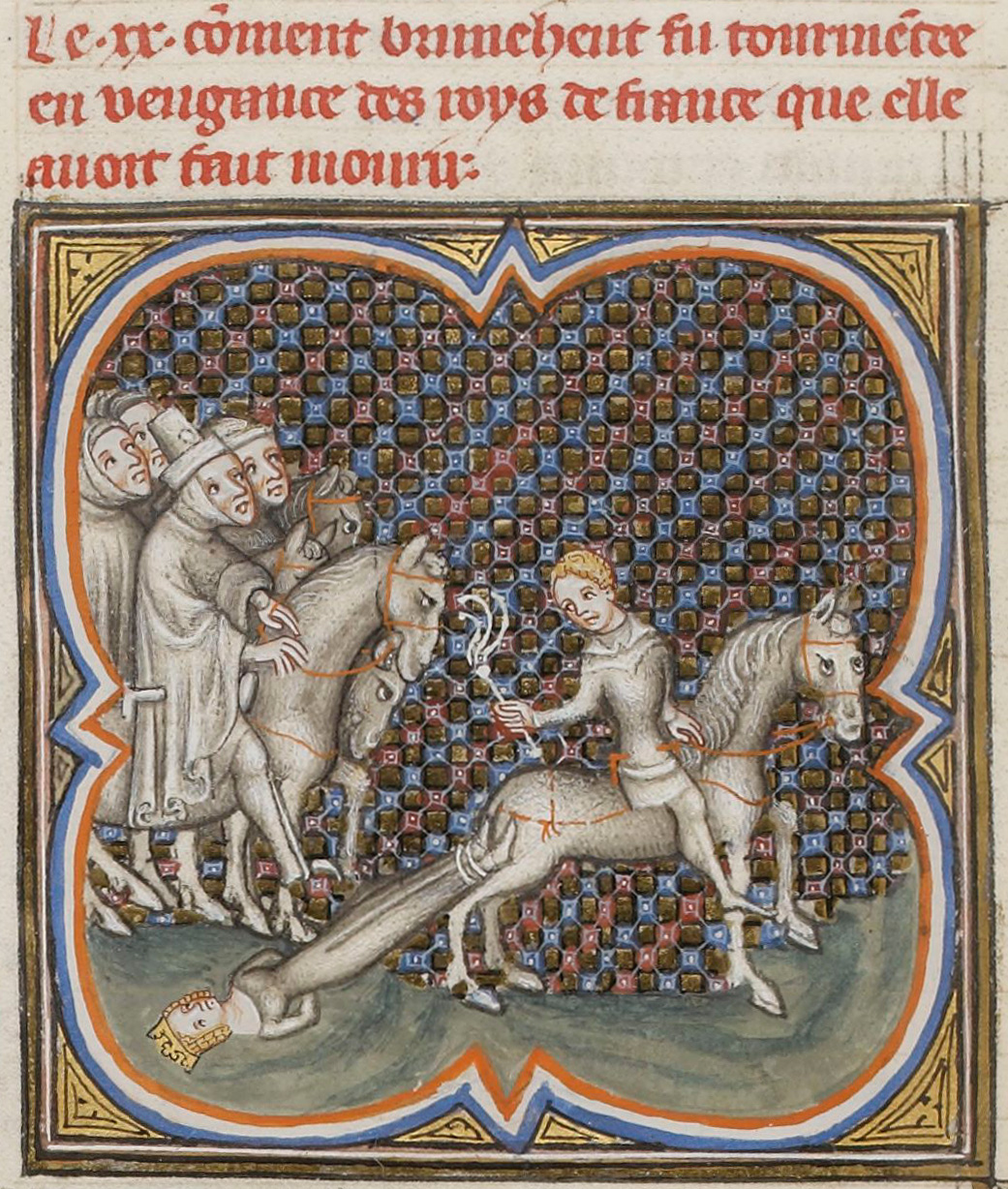
Brunhilde is dragged to her death

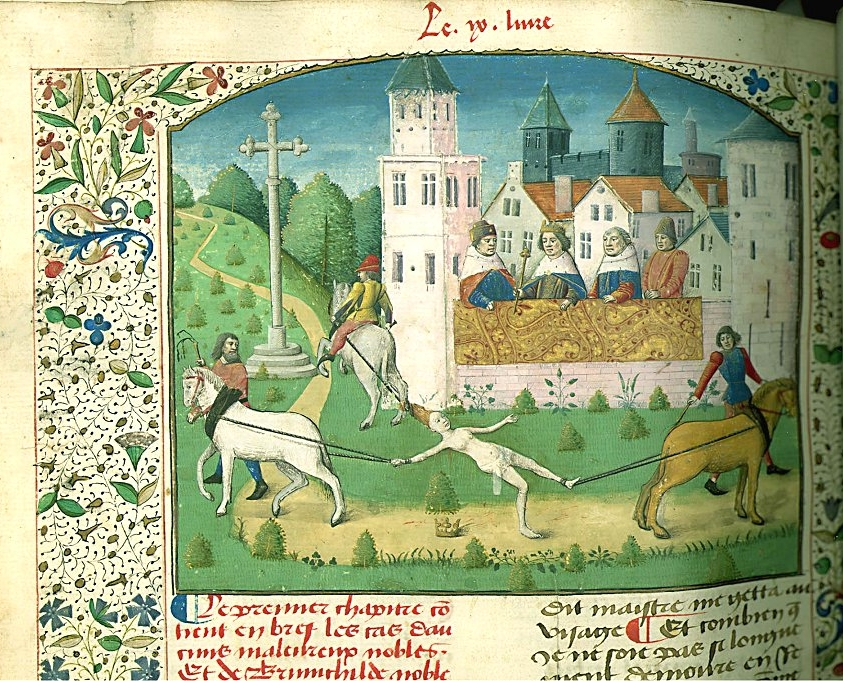
The murder of Brunhilda, from De Casibus Virorum Illustrium, attributed to Maître François, Paris, c. 1475

=== Third regency ===
The successor of Theuderic II was his son Sigebert, a child. The mayor of the palace of Austrasia, Warnachar, fearing that at his young age he would fall under the influence of his great-grandmother, brought him before a national assembly, where he was proclaimed king by the nobles, who then did homage to him ruling over both his father's kingdoms. Nonetheless, he could not be kept out of the influence of Brunhilda. Thus, for the last time in a long life (now in her seventies), she was regent of the Franks, this time for her own great-grandson.

But Warnachar and Rado, mayor of the palace of Burgundy, along with Pepin of Landen and Arnulf of Metz, resentful of her regency, abandoned the cause of Brunhilda over the young king and joined with her old antagonist Clotaire II, promising not to rise in defence of the queen-regent and recognising Clotaire as rightful regent and guardian of Sigebert. Brunhilda, with Sigebert, met Clotaire's army on the Aisne, but the dukes yet again betrayed her: the Patrician Aletheus, Duke Rocco and Duke Sigvald deserted her and she and her king had to flee. They fled as far as the city of Orbe (in today French Switzerland), hoping to enlist the aid of certain German tribes, but Clotaire's minions caught up with them by Lake Neuchâtel. The young king and his brother Corbo were both killed: thus ended the long and bloody feud between Austrasia and Neustria, and, reuniting the two kingdoms, Clotaire held the entire realm of the Franks.

Clotaire then accused Brunhilda of the death of ten kings of the Franks.

The identity of the ten kings comes from the Fourth Book of the Chronicle of Fredegar. It is usually said to include Sigebert I, Chilperic I, Theudebert II, Theuderic II, Sigebert II, Merovech (Chilperic's son), Merovech (Theuderic's son), Corbo (Theuderic's son) and Childebert (Theuderic's son) and the sons of Theudebert, along with many churchmen, including Desiderius. According to the Liber Historiae Francorum:

Then the army of the Franks and Burgundians joined into one, all shouted together that death would be most fitting for the very wicked Brunhilda. Then King Clotaire ordered that she be lifted onto a camel and led through the entire army. Then she was tied to the feet of wild horses and torn apart limb from limb. Finally she died. Her final grave was the fire. Her bones were burnt.

One legend has her being dragged by a wild mare down the Roman road La Chaussée Brunehaut at Abbeville.

== Religion ==
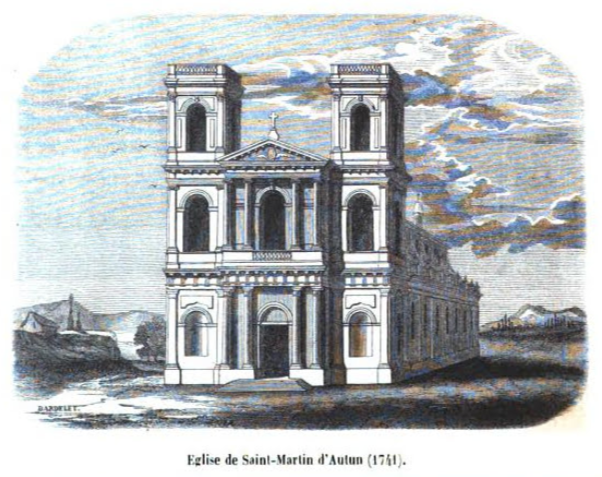
Abbey of St Martin, Autun in 1741

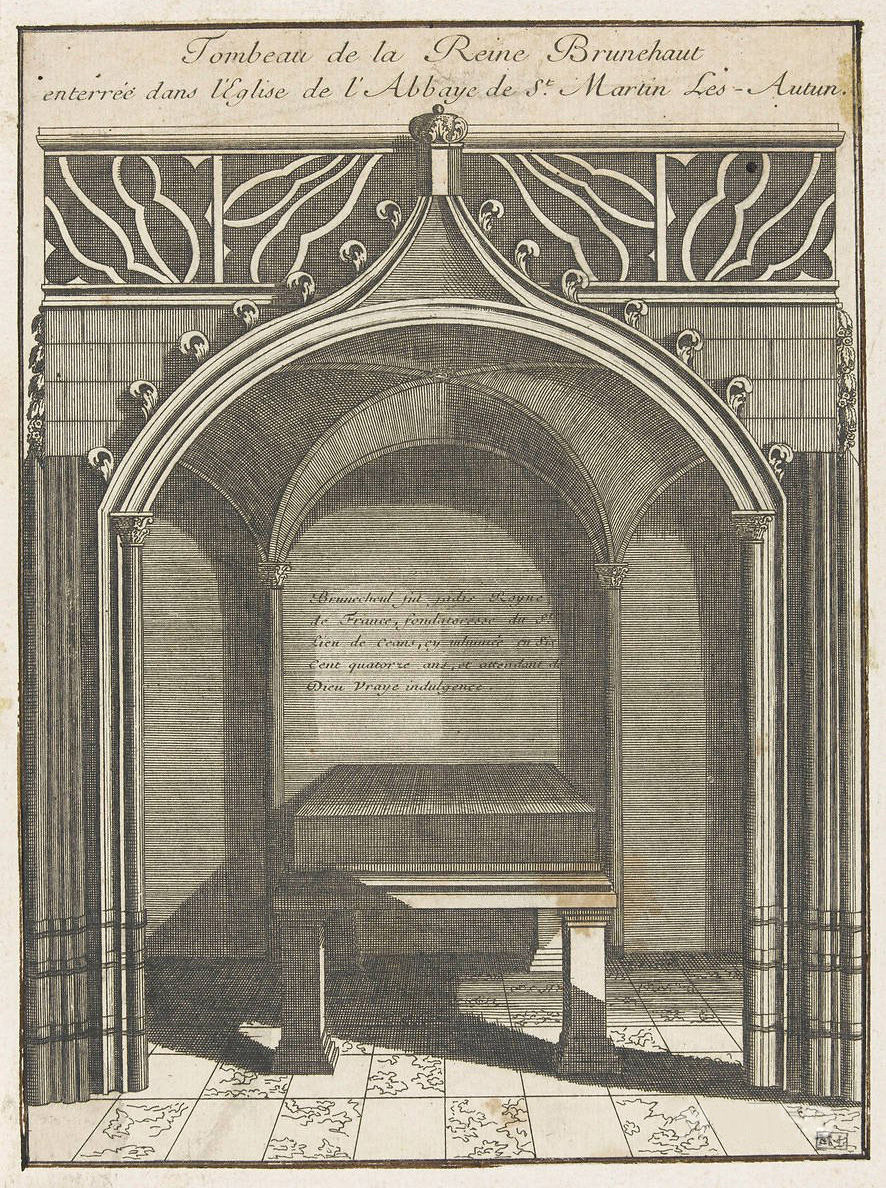
Tomb of Brunhilda in the abbey church before 1790 (early 19th-century engraving by Alexandre Lenoir)

Brunhilda was raised as an Arian Christian, but upon her marriage to Sigebert, converted to Catholic Christianity. In general, she protected the church and treated Pope Gregory the Great with great respect. He wrote a series of positive letters to her. Then in 597 he found her useful in resolving a problem that needed redress in the Frankish kingdom, that is, the continued pagan worship of idols and trees, practices which her bishop, Syagrius of Autun, had not sufficiently addressed. When Brunhilda wrote Gregory seeking the pallium for Syagrius, the pope saw his opportunity to address the bishop's derelictions, agreeing to grant the request on condition that Brunhilda restrain, under the regulation of discipline, those who were practicing the acts which Syagrius had ignored.

Gregory of Tours was another favoured cleric; he was a trusted courtier to her and her son from 587 until his death. She also took a keen personal interest in the bishoprics and monasteries within her dominion. This brought her into conflict with Columbanus, abbot of Luxeuil, whom she eventually exiled to Italy, where he founded Bobbio. Brunhilda also played a role in perpetuating the diocese of Maurienne as a suffragan bishopric of the archdiocese of Vienne. In 576, Brunhilda's protector, Sigebert's brother Guntram, had founded the new bishopric at Saint-Jean-de-Maurienne, separating the Maurienne Valley and the neighboring Susa Valley from the Diocese of Turin. The Bishop of Turin protested this to Brunhilda for more than twenty years, but even when Pope Gregory the Great supported his complaint in 599, Brunhilda dismissed it.

Brunhilda was buried in the abbey of St. Martin at Autun that she founded in 602 on the spot where the bishop of Tours had cut down a beech-tree that served as an object of pagan worship. The abbey and her tomb [containing bone, ash and part of a wheel] were destroyed in 1793; however two parts of the cover of Brunhilda's sarcophagus are now in the Musée Rolin in Autun.

== Legacy ==
Brunhilda commissioned the building of several churches and the abbey of St. Vincent at Laon (founded in 580). She is also credited with founding the castle of Bruniquel and having a Roman road resurfaced near Alligny-en-Morvan (where the name of a nearby hill Terreau Bruneau is believed to be derived from hers). The part of Mauves-sur-Loire known as la Fontaine Bruneau is named after Brunhilda who may have cooled herself with the fountain's water when she suffered heat exhaustion. Her name is remembered in several highways in today's Northern France and South-Western Belgium, called "Chaussée Brunehaut".

== In legend ==
Many scholars have seen Brunhilda as inspiration for both Brunhild and Kriemhild, two rival characters from the Nibelungenlied. Kriemhild married Siegfried, who in many respects resembles Sigebert, Brunhilda's husband. There is resemblance between a multitude of characters and events in the Nibelungenlied and those of the latter half of the sixth century in Merovingian Gaul. As Thomas Hodgkin remarks:

Treasures buried in long departed days by kings of old, mysterious caves, reptile guides or reptile guardians - are we not transported by this strange legend into the very atmosphere of the Niebelungen Lied? And if the good king Gunthram passed for the fortunate finder of the Dragon-hoard, his brothers and their queens, by their wars, their reconciliations and their terrible avengings, must surely have suggested the main argument of that most tragical epic, the very name of one of whose heroines, Brunichildis, is identical with the name of the queen of Austrasia.

== See also ==
- Barberini ivory

== Sources ==
- Gregory of Tours, History of the Franks: Books I-X
- John Michael Wallace-Hadrill (translator), The Fourth Book of the Chronicle of Fredegar with its Continuations, Connecticut: Greenwood Press, 1960.
- Bernard S. Bachrach (translator), Liber Historiae Francorum, 1973.
- Encyclopædia Britannica 2004:
  - Brunhild, retrieved 19 February 2005.
  - Brunhild, retrieved 17 September 2005.
- Encyclopaedia Britannica, Brunhild, Queen of Austrasia
