= John of Biclaro =

Visigoth bishop and chronicler

John of Biclaro, Biclar, or Biclarum (c. 540 – after 621), also Iohannes Biclarensis, was a Visigothic Catholic bishop of Girona. He is best known for his chronicle covering the years 568-590.

== Life ==
Isidore of Seville tells us in his De viris Illustribus that John was born in Lusitania, in the city of Scallabis (modern Santarém in Portugal) of Gothic parents. How and when he converted to Catholicism is not known. While still a youth, John was sent to Constantinople for his education, where he resided for 7 years. Roger Collins calculates the dates of his stay there as c.562-c.579, although Kenneth Baxter Wolf provides the dates c.569-c.576 for his stay.

Upon his return, John was exiled by the Visigothic king to Barcelona for ten years. Isidore of Seville ascribes this to his refusal to join the Arian Church of the Visigothic realm in Hispania. Modern historians note that other contemporary Iberian sources, including John's own Chronicle do not attest a Visigothic campaign of persecution of Catholics until the revolt of Hermenegild divided Visigothic loyalties. The Visigothic persecutions of dissenters and Jews may be a more recent Catholic myth. Indeed, John wrote that, in 578, "Leovigild had peace to reside with his own people."

Another possible reason for John's detention was his lengthy stay at Constantinople, with the possibility that he might be a spy for the Byzantine governors in the far south of Iberia. An enforced stay in Barcelona certainly put him out of possible treasonous contact with the Byzantines. John does imply that Arians received favorable treatment under Leovigild. At the Arian council convened by Leovigild in 580, his proposal to make conversion from Catholicism to Arianism a simple ritual was adopted, dropping the need for re-baptism and requiring "only the imposition of hands and the receiving of communion."

Following King Reccared I commanded his kingdom to embrace Catholicism, John was recalled from exile in 589. He founded a monastery at Biclar, possibly near Tarraconensis, for which he composed a Rule that has since been lost. At some point between 589 and 592 he was ordained bishop of Girona. As bishop he signed the acts of the synods of II Saragossa (592), of Toledo (597), of Barcelona (599), and likely those of Egara (Municipium Flavium Egara) (614).

A bishop of Girona known as Johannes Gerundensis ("John of Girona") seems to have been a successor of the chronicler, though some have identified him with the chronicler.

== Writings ==
Isidore reports that John of Biclaro wrote a number of works, although his only surviving work is his Chronicle. It is believed he completed this chronicle soon after its last entry, 590. It was intended to be a continuation of the chronicle of Victor of Tunnuna, in Africa (Chronicon continuans Victorem Tunnunensem), although "there is little to connect the two, apart from John's point of departure (567) and his use of emperors rather than the consuls as chronological signposts." For example, where Victor concentrated on matters of the church, John provided a balanced account of both sacred and secular affairs. Also significant is John's admiration for the Visigothic rulers, both Arian and Catholic. He makes the effort "of transferring the symbolism traditionally associated with the Christian Roman emperors" to these Gothic rulers.

John of Biclaro's Chronicle was first printed by H. Canisius (Ingolstadt, 1600). Mommsen has edited the Chronicle as part of the Monumenta Germaniae Historica, Auctores antiquissimi, XI (1893), pp. 211-220. A more recent edition can be found in J. Campos, Juan de Biclaro, Obisclaro de Gerona (Madrid, 1960).

Three other chronicles cover parts of the Visigothic rule of Hispania: the bishop Hydatius, bishop Isidore of Seville, and the fragmentary Chronicle of Saragossa.
