= Galswintha =

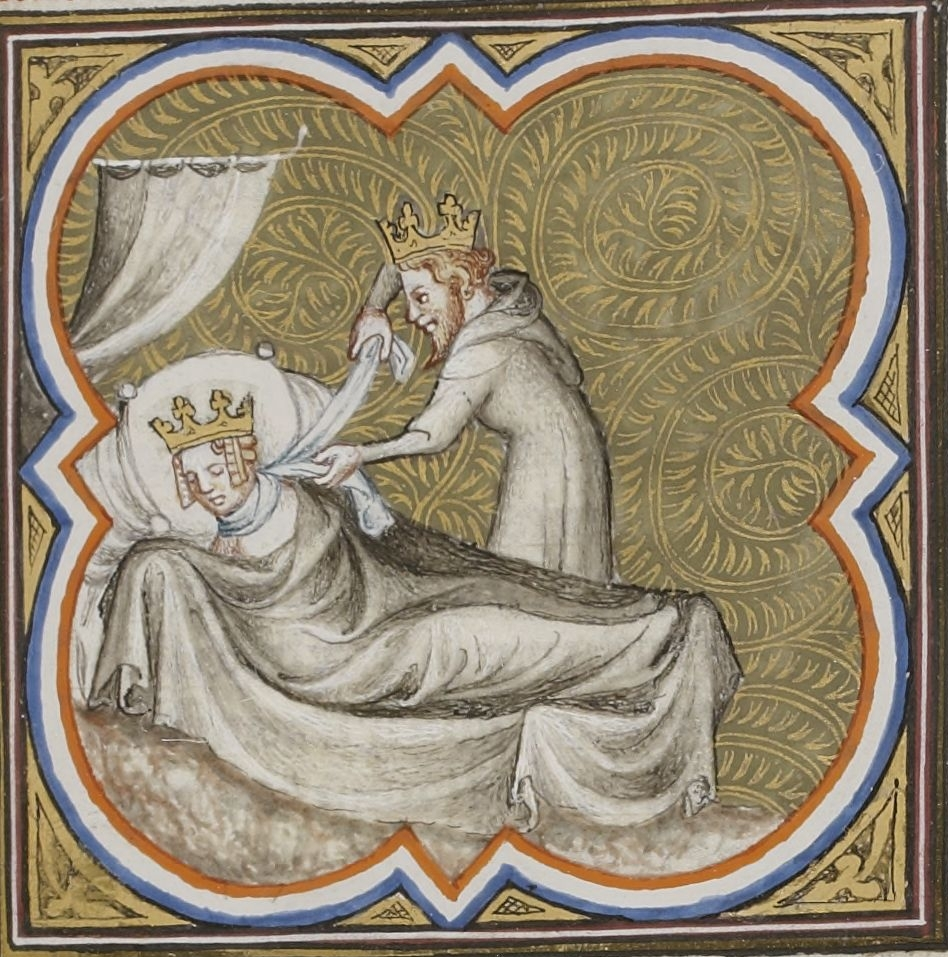
- The strangling of Galswintha by Chilperic I

Queen consort of Neustria (Soissons)
- Tenure: 567 – 568
- Born: c. 540; Hispania, Byzantine Empire
- Died: 568 (aged 27–28); Neustria, Francia
- Spouse: Chilperic I
- Father: Athanagild
- Mother: Goiswintha
- Religion: Arianism

Galswintha, also written Galswinthe, (c. 540 – 568) was a queen consort of Neustria (a western part of Francia, now a large part of the north of modern France). She was the daughter of Athanagild, the Visigothic king of Hispania (the Iberian Peninsula, comprising modern Spain and Portugal), and Goiswintha. Galswintha was the sister of Brunhilda—queen consort of Austrasia—and the wife of Chilperic I, the Merovingian king of Neustria. Galswintha was probably murdered at the urging of Chilperic's former concubine Fredegund (and then later wife), instigating a 40-year civil war within the Merovingian kingdom.

== History ==
Merovingian king, Chilperic I (561–584), ruled over Neustria, which despite being less extensive in total land than that presided over by his brother, King Sigebert I, was wealthier since the cities of Paris, Tours and Rouen all fell under its purview. Chilperic sought Galswintha's hand in marriage after Sigebert married the noblewoman, Brunhilda (Galswintha's sister), (Note: For much of his reign, Chilperic fought with his brother and Brunhilda for regional dominance.) a union that violated the Merovingian tradition of seeking the hand of a lowborn woman instead. Galswintha—daughter of the Visigothic king, Athanagild—was not initially in favor of being betrothed to a northern Frankish king nor was her father, as the Visigoths considered the Franks barbarians.

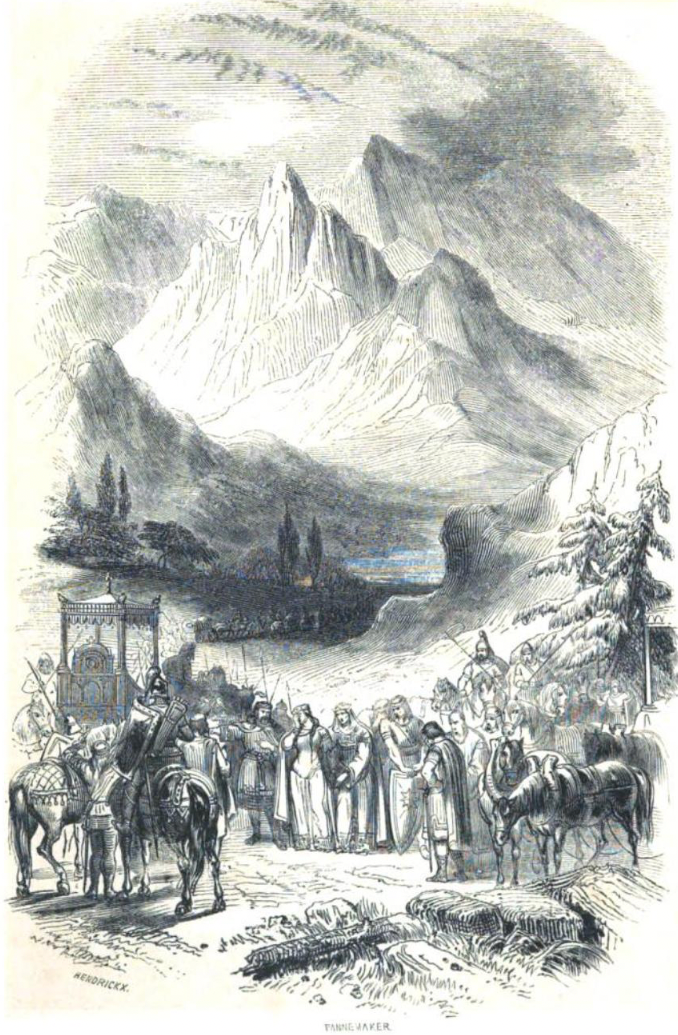
Henri Hendrickx, Départ de Galswinthe (1847)

To the dismay of her mother, Galswintha was ultimately forced to part with her family on her father Athanagild's insistence, who conceded to the marriage. This was likely due to the territorial enticements promised by Chilperic. Once the marriage was agreed, Galswintha was sent away; her escort to Chilperic's side consisted of nobles and warriors from among both the Goths and Franks. (Note: According to Gregory of Tours, Chilperic was betrothed to multiple women at the time of his marriage to Galswintha and had promised to dismiss all of them if she accepted his proposal. Chilperic honored his avowal by dispensing with his other wives once he married Galswintha.) Crossing the Pyrenees, Galswintha's journey took her through Narbonne and Carcassonne then on to Poitiers and Tours before reaching Rouen, the location of the marriage arrangement. Pomp and circumstance awaited her upon arrival as Chilperic made a great display of his power and commitment, including having his army pledge allegiance on bended-knee to her as she exited the ship at Rouen.

Immediately after their betrothal, sometime between 566 and 567, Chilperic gave Galswintha the cities of Limoges, Bordeaux, Cahors, Bearn, and Bigorre as a gift. Chilperic supposedly loved her "dearly" according to Gregory of Tours, however this was most likely due to her substantial dowry. His former concubine Fredegund continued to visit the king's bedchamber, despite his proclaimed commitment to Galswintha and to her father Athanagild that he would respect the Visigothic marriage codes—these charters forbade concubines and mistresses. Galswintha complained bitterly about this betrayal. Still in love with Fredegund, Chilperic allowed himself to be manipulated and had his wealthy wife murdered. Galswintha was apparently strangled. Historian Patrick J. Geary surmises that Galswintha may also have been murdered as a consequence of Chilperic's fear that she would leave with her dowry. After Galswintha's death, however, the lands—formerly given by Chilperic—were passed on to her sister Brunhilda.

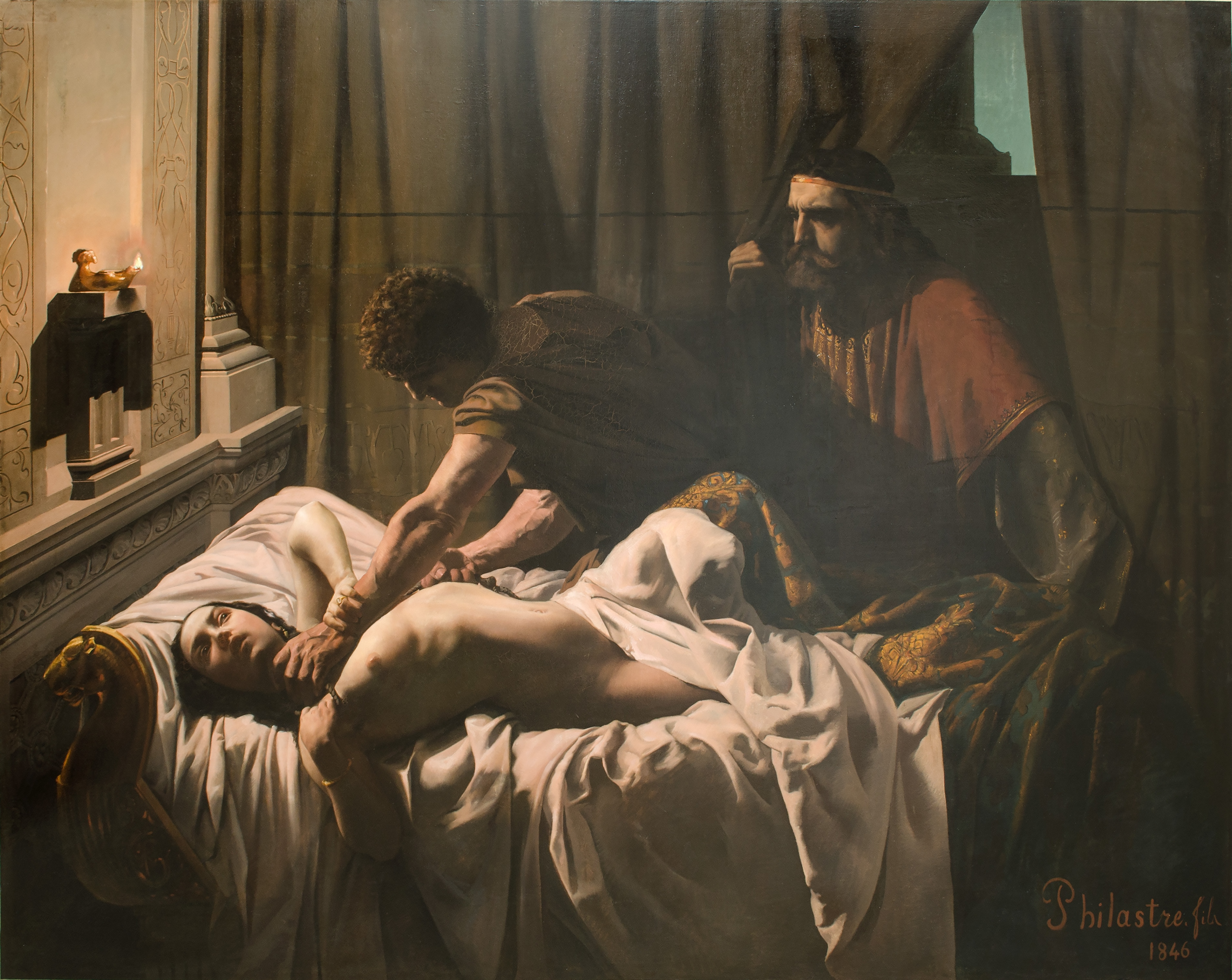
Eugène Philastre, Meurtre de la reine Galswinthe (1846)

Three days after Galswintha was murdered, Chilperic married Fredegund. Galswintha's untimely death aroused the enmity of her sister Brunhilda; it also set Chilperic's brother Sigebert, as Brunhilda's husband, against him and Fredegund, bringing about 40 years of conflict between the Frankish kingdoms of Austrasia and Neustria—constituting something of a civil war among the Merovingians. When Chilperic was murdered in 584, Brunhilda's anger remained unassuaged, and the conflict following Galswintha's murder continued until Fredegund's death in 597. Beyond this, the result of such antipathy was a three-generation-long feud that, in the words of Geary, "wrecked the Merovingian family" and contributed to the death of ten kings from its line.

== Legacy ==
Galswintha remains listed in modern genealogical charts demonstrating the links between the Visigothic kingdoms and the Byzantine Empire.

=== In verse ===
The Late Latin poet Venantius Fortunatus wrote a long commemorative poem (Carmina VI.5) in honour of Galswintha, (Note: English translation by Judith George, in Venantius Fortunatus: Personal & Political Poems (Liverpool: Translated Texts for Historians, 1995), pp. 40–50.) constituting a eulogy of sorts that presented her as a saintly figure and the acts of betrayal and murder within Chilperic's domain as an offense to God himself.

=== In popular culture ===
In 2013, symphonic metal band Leaves' Eyes included on their album Symphonies of the Night a song titled "Galswintha". (Note: See the following: https://open.spotify.com/album/6FwVrwf6ME37vIf7AylYsf)

== See also ==
- "Porphyria's Lover"
- Merovingian dynasty
- Visigoths
