= Athanagild =

King of the Visigoths
- Reign: March 554 – December 567
- Predecessor: Agila I
- Successor: Liuva I and Liuvigild
- Born: c. 517
- Died: December 567 (aged 50)
- Consort: Goiswintha
- Issue: Brunhilda of Austrasia; Galswintha, Queen of Neustria

Athanagild (c. 517 – December 567) was the Visigothic king of Hispania and Septimania. He had rebelled against his predecessor, Agila I, in 551. The armies of Agila and Athanagild met at Seville, where Agila met a second defeat. Following the death of Agila in 554, he was sole ruler for the rest of his reign.

Roger Collins writes that Athanagild's reign "is perhaps more significant than our sources may care to let us believe." Collins argues that the account of Isidore of Seville may be colored by the hostility subsequent Visigothic kings had towards Athanagild and his descendants.

== The Roman invasion ==
During the conflict between the two, a Roman force sent by Justinian seized control of a large portion of Hispania Baetica (Andalusia). The pretext for their arrival is unclear. Peter Heather states that Jordanes implies that Agila had summoned them. Isidore of Seville offers two conflicting stories: in the section on Agila, the Goths surrounding him killed him out of fear "that Roman soldiers might invade Spain on the pretext of giving help"; while in the following section Isidore states Athanagild had asked Justinian for his help, but once they arrived in Spain "he was unable to remove them from the territory of the kingdom despite his efforts." Collins notes that "in both of the emperor Justinian's other western interventions, Africa in 533 and Italy in 535, he came in ostensibly to uphold the rights of legitimate monarchs against usurpers", thus agreeing with Jordanes' version of the events.

Although Athanagild recovered a few cities, the Romans held most of their conquest, which was organized as the province of Spania, long after the end of his reign. It is unclear the exact area this province covered. J. B. Bury states that it "comprised districts and towns to the west as well as to the east of the Straits of Gades" and included the cities of New Carthage (Cartagena), Corduba (Córdoba), and Assidonia. Peter Heather, while agreeing it included New Carthage and Assionia, is dubious about Corduba, and is certain Málaga, and Sagontia were included. Collins agrees that Corduba did not come under Roman control, nor did the Guadalquivir valley, stating that their principal strongholds were Medina Sidonia, Málaga and New Carthage.

Athanagild died of natural causes in Toledo, according to Isidore, then, after an interregnum of five months, Liuva I became king.

== Dynastic alliances ==
His queen, Goiswintha, gave him two daughters — Brunhilda and the murdered Galswintha — who were married to two Merovingian brother-kings: Sigebert I of Austrasia and Chilperic, king of the Neustrian Franks. Although Gregory of Tours states the reasons for this were that Sigebert disdained the prevalent practice of "taking wives who were completely unworthy of them", and sought the beautiful and cultured Brunhilda, while Chilperic married her sister out of sibling rivalry, Ian Wood points out that the circumstances and the scale of the morgengab suggest that the situation was more complex. "Athanagild had no sons. By marrying two daughters to Frankish kings, he may have intended to involve the Merovingians in the Visigothic succession. Perhaps he hoped that the marriages would produce grandsons who could succeed him."

However Athanagild's death in 567 altered the situation. Wood speculates that the date of Galswintha's murder followed soon after his death. Brunhilda avoided her sister's fate, and became a central figure of Frankish history for the remainder of the sixth century. Lastly, Goiswintha survived the upheaval that followed Athangild's death, and became the second wife of Liuvigild, the brother of Athangild's successor Liuva, and himself a future king of the Visigoths.

Regnal titles
Preceded by Agila I	King of the Visigoths; 554–567	Succeeded by Liuva I and Liuvigild
