= Sigebert I =

King of Austrasia from 561 to 575

Sigebert I *Sigiberht
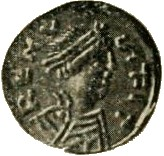
- Sigebert I's bust on his coin, minted in Reims

King of Austrasia
- Reign: 561–575
- Predecessor: Clotaire I
- Successor: Childebert II
- Born: c. 535
- Died: c. 575 (aged 39–40); Vitry-en-Artois
- Consort: Brunhilda of Austrasia
- Issue: Ingund; Chlodosind; Childebert II
- Dynasty: Merovingian
- Father: Clotaire I
- Mother: Ingund

Sigebert I (c. 535 – c. 575) was a Frankish king of Austrasia from the death of his father in 561 to his own death. He was the third surviving son out of four of Clotaire I and Ingund. His reign found him mostly occupied with a successful civil war against his half-brother, Chilperic.

When Clotaire I died in 561, his kingdom was divided, in accordance with Frankish custom, among his four sons: Sigebert became king of the northeastern portion, known as Austrasia, with its capital at Rheims, to which he added further territory on the death of his brother, Charibert I, in 567 or 568; Charibert himself had received the kingdom centred on Paris; Guntram received the Kingdom of Burgundy with its capital at Orléans; and the youngest son, the aforementioned Chilperic, received Soissons, which became Neustria when he received his share of Charibert's kingdom. Incursions by the Avars, a fierce nomadic tribe related to the Huns, caused Sigebert to move his capital from Rheims to Metz. He repelled their attacks twice, in 562 and c. 568. He was defeated and captured by Huns (Avars), but at the end he made peace with them.

About 567, he married Brunhilda, daughter of the Visigothic king Athanagild. According to Gregory of Tours:

Now when king Sigebert saw that his brothers were taking wives unworthy of them, and to their disgrace were actually marrying slave women, he sent an embassy into Spain and with many gifts asked for Brunhilda, daughter of king Athanagild. She was a maiden beautiful in her person, lovely to look at, virtuous and well-behaved, with good sense and a pleasant address. Her father did not refuse, but sent her to the king I have named with great treasures. And the king collected his chief men, made ready a feast, and took her as his wife amid great joy and mirth. And though she was a follower of the Arian law she was converted by the preaching of the bishops and the admonition of the king himself, and she confessed the blessed Trinity in unity, and believed and was baptized. And she still remains catholic in Christ's name.

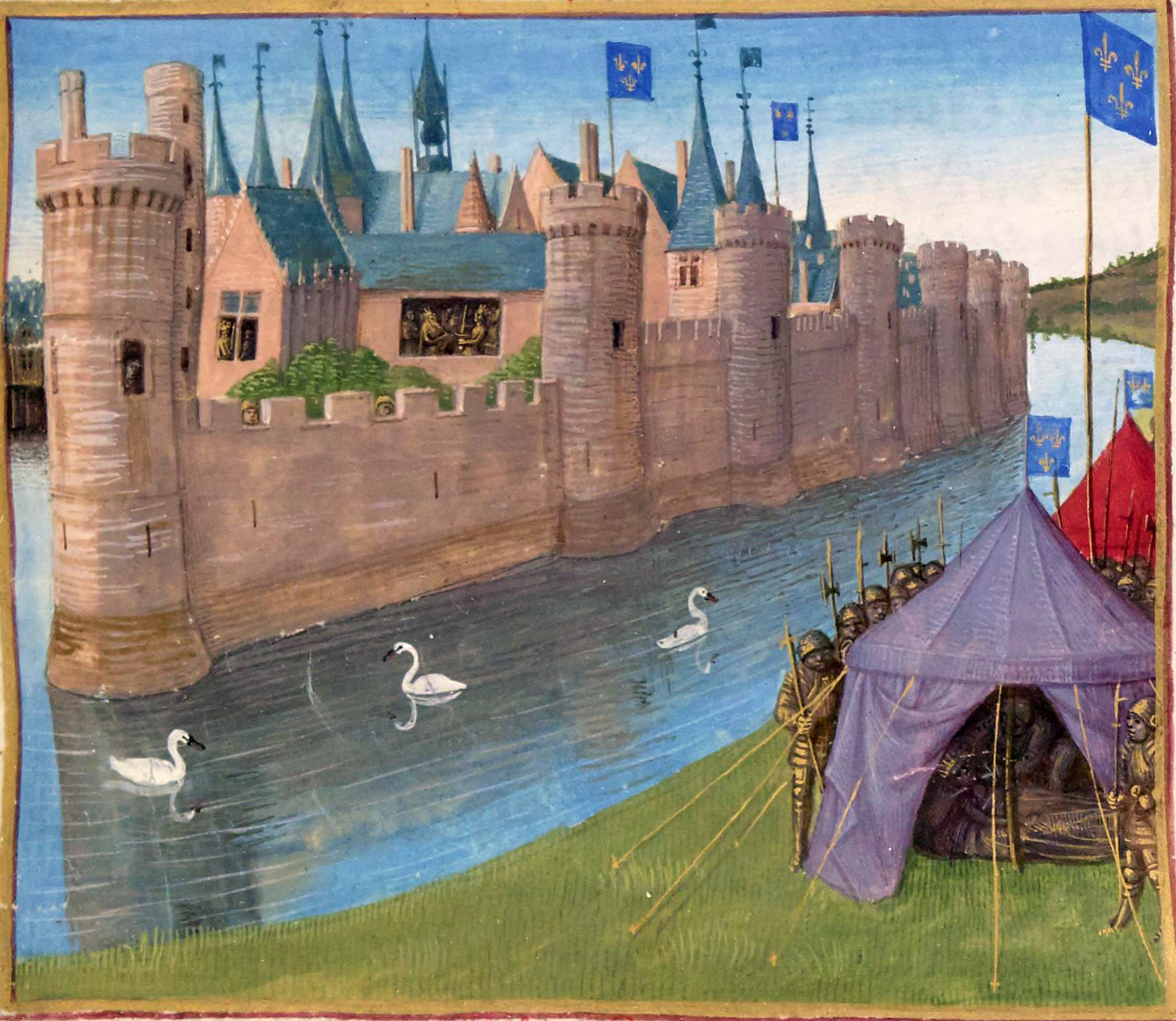
The assassination of Sigebert by Jean Fouquet, from the fifteenth century Grandes Chroniques de France.

Upon seeing this, his brother Chilperic sent to Athanagild for his other daughter's hand. This daughter, Galswintha, was given him and he abandoned his other wives. However, he soon tired of her and had her murdered in order to marry his mistress Fredegund. Probably spurred by his wife Brunhilda's anger at her sister's murder, Sigebert sought revenge. The two brothers had already been at war, but their hostility now elevated into a long and bitter war that was continued by the descendants of both.

In 573, Sigebert took possession of Poitiers and Touraine, and conquered most of his kingdom. Chilperic then hid in Tournai. But at Sigebert's moment of triumph, when he had just been declared king by Chilperic's subjects at Vitry-en-Artois, he was struck down by two assassins working for Fredegund.

He was succeeded by his son Childebert under the regency of Brunhilda. Brunhilda and Childebert quickly put themselves under the protection of Guntram, who eventually adopted Childebert as his own son and heir. With Brunhilda he had two daughters: Ingund and Chlodosind.

== Sources ==
- Dahmus, Joseph Henry. Seven Medieval Queens. 1972.

Regnal titles
Preceded by Clotaire I	King of Austrasia; 561–575	Succeeded by Childebert II
Preceded by Chilperic I	King of Neustria; 575	Succeeded by Chilperic I
