= Hermenegild =

Visigothic prince and Catholic martyr

Saint Hermenegild
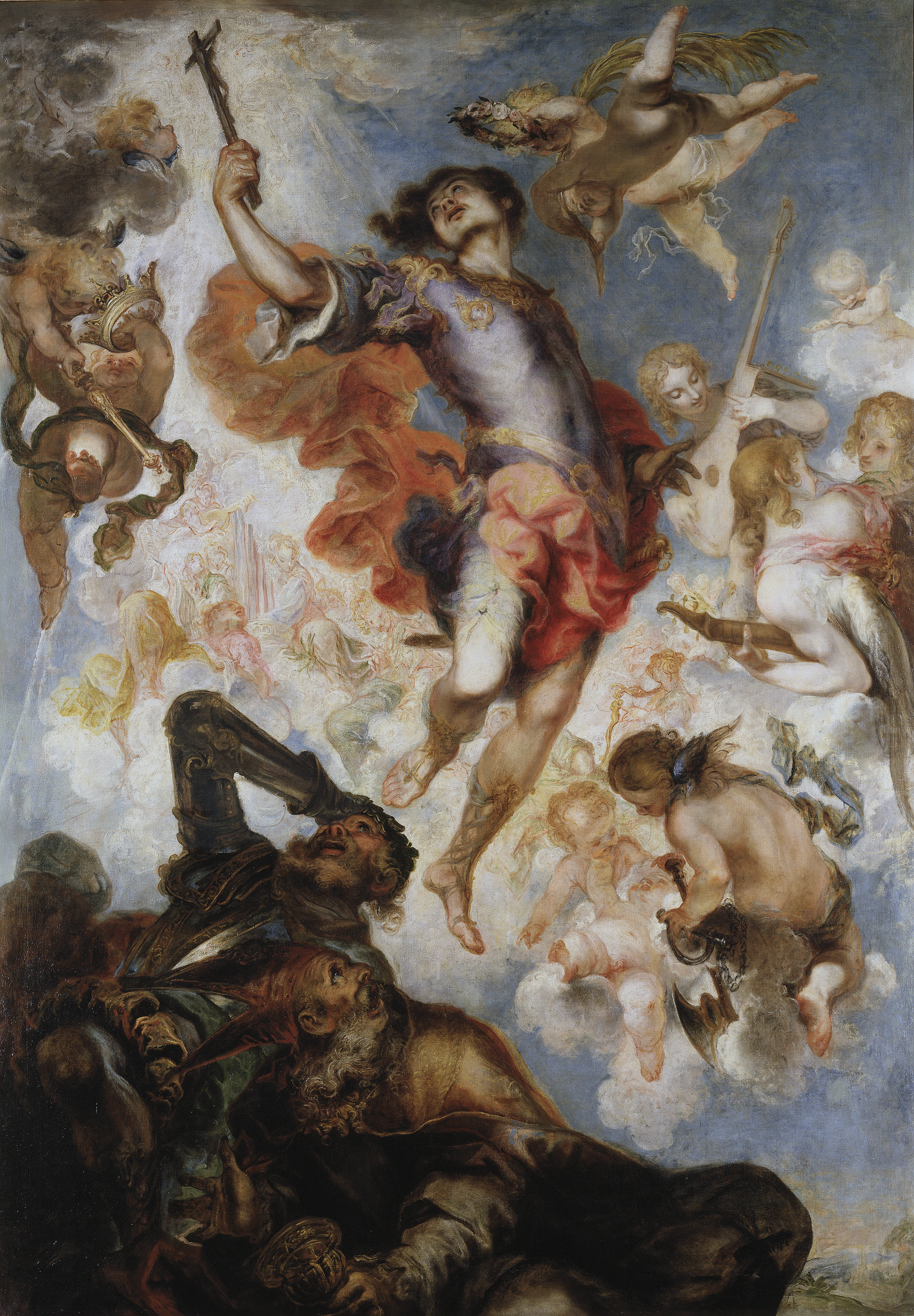
- El Triunfo de San Hermenegildo by Francisco Herrera the Younger (1654)

Martyr
- Born: Toletum, Visigothic Kingdom
- Died: c. 13 April 585; Hispalis, Hispania
- Venerated in: Catholic Church; Eastern Orthodox Church
- Feast: April 13
- Attributes: axe, crown, sword, and cross
- Patronage: Seville, Spain

Saint Hermenegild or Ermengild (died 13 April 585; Spanish: San Hermenegildo; Latin: Hermenegildus), was the son of King Liuvigild of the Visigothic Kingdom in the Iberian Peninsula and southern France. He fell out with his father in 579, then revolted the following year. During his rebellion, he converted from Arianism to Catholicism. Hermenegild was defeated in 584 and exiled. His death was later celebrated as a martyrdom due to the influence of Pope Gregory I's Dialogues, in which he portrayed Hermenegild as a "Catholic martyr rebelling against the tyranny of an Arian father."

== Marriage to Ingund ==
Hermenegild was the eldest son of Liuvigild and his first wife. He was a brother of Reccared I and brought up an Arian. Liuvigild made his sons co-regents.

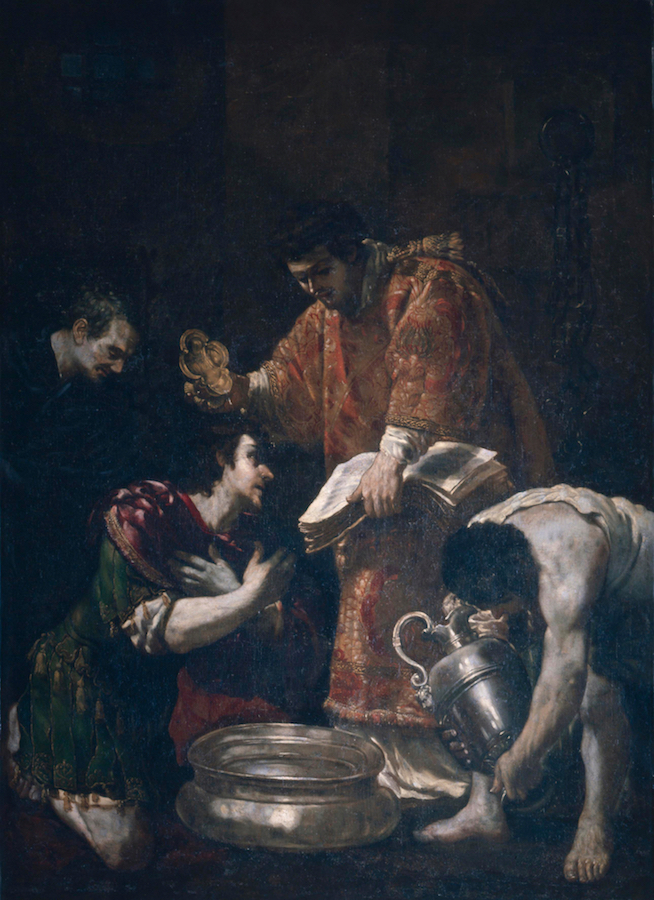
The Baptism of Saint Hermenegild, attributed to Guercino, 17th century

In 579, he married Ingund, the daughter of the Frankish King Sigebert I of Austrasia who was a Catholic. Her mother was the Visigoth princess Brunhilda of Austrasia. The twelve-year-old Ingund was pressured by Hermenegild's stepmother Goiswintha to abjure her beliefs, but she stayed firm in her faith.

Liuvigild sent Hermenegild to the south to govern on his behalf. There, he came under the influence of Leander of Seville, the older brother of Isidore of Seville. Hermenegild was converted to Catholicism. His family demanded for him to return to Arianism, but he refused.

Around then, he led a revolt against Liuvigild. Contemporary accounts attribute that to politics, rather than primarily religious differences. He asked for the aid of the Byzantine Empire, but it was occupied with defending itself from territorial incursions by the Sasanian Empire. For a time, Hermenegild had the support of the Suebi, who had been defeated by Liuvigild in 579, but he forced them to capitulate once again in 583.

Hermenegild fled to Seville and when it fell to a siege in 584, he went to Córdoba. After Liuvigild paid 30,000 pieces of gold, the Byzantines withdrew and took Ingund and her son with them.

Hermenegild sought sanctuary in a church. Liuvigild would not violate the sanctuary. He sent Reccared inside to speak with Hermenegild and to offer peace. That was accepted, and peace was made for some time.

== Imprisonment and death ==
Goiswintha, however, brought about another alienation within the family. Hermenegild was imprisoned in Tarragona or Toledo. During his captivity in the tower of Seville, an Arian bishop was sent to Hermenegild for Easter but he would not accept the Eucharist from him. King Liuvigild ordered him beheaded; he was executed on 13 April 585.

== Reputation and legacy ==
Hermenegild's reputation as a Catholic martyr is not present in contemporary Spanish accounts, such as John of Biclaro's Chronicon continuans Victorem Tunnunensem and Isidore of Seville's Historia de regibus Gothorum, Vandalorum et Suevorum, which mention only his revolt and not his conversion. The French chronicler Gregory of Tours, in his Decem Libri Historiarum, recounts Hermenegild's conversion and credits it as the cause of his rebellion; however, he judges Hermenegild harshly as a traitor. Of Hermenegild, Gregory wrote: "Poor prince, he did not realize that the judgment of God hangs over anyone who makes such plans against his own father, even if that father be a heretic." It is the Italian Pope Gregory I who first identifies Hermenegild as a martyr. Writing in his Dialogues, Pope Gregory states that Hermenegild was killed after refusing communion from an Arian bishop. Pope Gregory credited Hermenegild's death as inspiring his brother Reccared's conversion, and thus the conversion of the Visigoth kingdom, saying that Reccared "could never have effected all this, if king Hermigildus had not died for the testimony of true religion; for, as it is written: Unless the grain of wheat falling into the earth doth die, itself remaineth alone; but if it die it bringeth forth much fruit." It is chiefly on Pope Gregory's assessment that Hermenegild's legacy rests.

As a Catholic martyr, Hermenegild rose to prominence in Spain during the period following the Reconquista, during which time there was renewed interest in the Visigothic "golden age." In 1585, at the urging of Philip II of Spain, Pope Sixtus V authorized the cult of Hermenegild in Spain; recognition was later extended to the whole church by Pope Urban VIII. Saint Hermenegild became celebrated through artistic representation such as poetry, painting, and plays. One example of this is El mártir del sacramento, San Hermenegildo, a Eucharistic play written in the 1680s by the Mexican nun Juana Inés de la Cruz. Another example is the Italian Cardinal Francesco Sforza Pallavicino's 1644 tragedy Ermenegildo martire, which is considered a masterpiece of seventeenth-century hagiographical drama. Francisco de Herrera the Younger's 1654 painting The Triumph of St. Hermenegild, originally for the Church of the Discalced Carmelites in Madrid, is now in the collection of the Museo del Prado.

In art and Catholic Iconography, Saint Hermenegild is depicted with an ax as well as a crown, sword, and cross. Hermenegild's entry in the Roman Martyrology, translated to English, reads: "In Seville, Spain, St. Hermenegild, Martyr. He was the son of Liuvigild, the Arian king of the Visigoths. He was imprisoned when he confessed the Catholic faith. When he refused to take communion from the Arian bishop during the Easter service, his perfidious father ordered that he be brought down with an axe. Thus he left this earthly realm and entered Heaven as a king and martyr." Hermenegild's feast day is April 13. He is the patron of the Royal Brotherhood of Veterans of the Armed Forces and the Civil Guard in Spain. The Royal and Military Order of Saint Hermenegild, established by Ferdinand VII of Spain in 1814, is also named in his honor.

== Parentage ==
According to the 9th-century Chronicle of Alfonso III, Erwig was the son of Ardabast, who had journeyed from the Byzantine Empire to Hispania during the time of Chindasuinth, and married Chindasuinth's niece Goda. Ardabast (or Artavasdos), was probably an Armenian or Persian Christian exile in Constantinople or in Byzantine Africa. In Hispania he was made a count.

17th-century Spanish genealogist Luis Bartolomé de Salazar y Castro gave Ardabast's father as Athanagild, the son of Saint Hermenegild and Ingund, and his mother as Flavia Juliana, a daughter of Peter Augustus and niece of the Emperor Maurice. This imperial connection is disputed by Christian Settipani, who says that the only source for Athanagild's marriage to Flavia Julia is José Pellicer, who he claims to be a forger.

== See also ==
- Saint Hermenegild, patron saint archive

== Sources ==
- Walsh, Michael, ed. (1991). Butler's Lives of the Saints: Concise Edition, Revised and Updated. San Francisco: Harper. ISBN 0-06-069299-5.
- Innes, Matthew (2007). Introduction to Early Medieval Europe, 300-900. The sword, the plough and the book. Routledge. p. 552. ISBN 978-0-203-64491-1.
