= Liuvigild =

Visigothic king

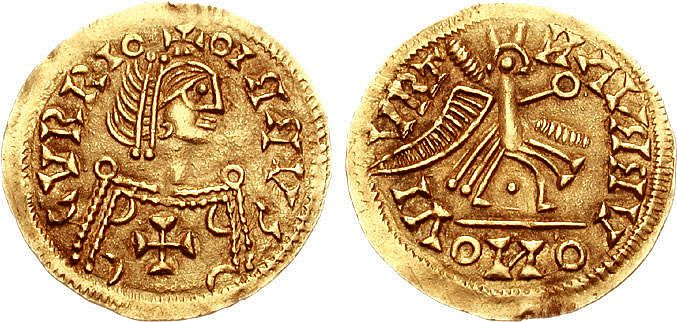
- Tremissis of Liuvigild, c. 573–578

King of the Visigoths
- Reign: 569 – 21 April 586
- Predecessor: Liuva I
- Successor: Reccared I
- Co-king: Liuva I (567–572)
- Born: c. 519 AD; Hispania
- Died: 21 April 586 (aged 67); Toledo, Hispania
- Spouse: Theodosia; Goiswintha
- Issue: Reccared I Saint Hermenegild
Names
- Flavius Leovigildus
- Religion: Arianism

Liuvigild (Gothic: 𐌻𐌹𐌿𐌱𐌰𐌲𐌹𐌻𐌳𐍃, Liubagilds), Leuvigild, Leovigild, or Leovigildo (Spanish and Portuguese; c. 519–586) was a Visigothic king of Hispania and Septimania from 569 to 586. Known for his Codex Revisus or Code of Leovigild, a law allowing equal rights between the Visigothic and Hispano-Roman population, his kingdom covered modern Spain down to Toledo and Portugal. Liuvigild ranks among the greatest Visigothic kings of the Arian period. He consolidated and expanded Visigothic power by defeating the Suebi, campaigning against the Byzantines in the south, and extending control over Basque territories. His legal reforms repealed prohibitions on intermarriage between Goths and Hispano-Romans, fostering greater unity within the kingdom.

== Life, campaigns and reign ==
When the Visigothic king Athanagild died in 567, Liuva I was elevated to the kingship at a ceremony held in Narbonne, the last bastion of Visigothic rule in Gaul. Recognizing the leadership qualities of his younger sibling, in the second year of his reign, King Liuva I declared his brother Liuvigild co-king and heir, assigning him Hispania Citerior, or the eastern part of Hispania (Spain), to directly rule over. Both co-regents were Arian Christians, which was the dominant religious faith of the Visigothic rulers until 587.

Liuvigild was married twice: first to Theodosia, who gave birth to two sons, Hermenegild and Reccared I, and after her death, to Athanagild's widow Goiswintha.

Almost every single year of his kingship, Liuvigild marched against the Byzantines, the Suebi, the Basques, or domestic competitors. According to the chronicle of John of Biclaro, as co-king Liuvigild initiated the first of several campaigns to expand the territory of the kingdom of the Visigoths, which Peter Heather describes as a "list of striking successes". Liuvigild's first campaign began against the Suebi in 569, during which he very quickly subdued Zamora, Palencia, and Leon. Then in 570, he attacked the district of Bastania Malagnefla (the ancient Bastetania), where he defeated imperial forces. In 570, Liuvigild "laid waste the region of Bastetania and the city of Málaga, defeating their soldiers". The following year he captured Medina Sidonia, assisted "through the treachery of a certain Framidaneus". (Note: His name may have been Framidanecus, which is possibly a Germanic name; he may also have been a Byzantine soldier of unknown Germanic origin (Gothic, Gepidian, or Erulian.)) Then, around the time he became sole ruler with the death of his brother Liuva (which occurred in either 571 or 572), seized Córdoba from the Byzantine Empire. (Note: During the civil war, which ended with Athanagild's rise to power some twenty years earlier, the Byzantines seized a stretch of territory in the southeast of Spain. John of Biclaro notes that upon gaining control of Córdoba, Liuvigild "slaughtered the enemy troops and made the city his own.") Though constantly at war with the Byzantines in southern Hispania, Liuvigild accepted the administration of the Byzantine Empire, adopted its pomp and ceremony, the title Flavius, the throne, crown, scepter, and purple mantle, and subsequently struck gold coins in his own name to commemorate the event.

Determined to exact revenge upon Liuvigild and reclaim their territories, the Suebi invaded the regions of Plasencia and Coria, Las Hurdes, Batuecas, and the territory of the Riccones. Whilst preparing to check the imminent advance of the Suebi in 573, Liuvigild received news that his brother Liuva had died, which left him ruler over the entirety of the Visigothic dominions. Liuvigild made efforts to secure a peaceful succession, a perennial Visigothic issue, by associating his two sons, Hermenegild and Reccared, with himself in the kingly office and placing certain regions under their regencies; namely, making them dukes over Toledo and Narbonne. (Note: Liuvigild renamed Toledo, Reccopolis, after his son.)

The Visigoths were still a military aristocracy and kings had to be formally ratified by the nobility. Visigoths and their Ibero-Roman subjects were still separated by religion and by distinct law codes. Liuvigild modified the old Code of Euric which governed the Goths and created his own Codex Revisus. He also repealed old Roman laws dating back to the late 4th century forbidding intermarriage between Visigoths and Ibero-Romans. Such marriages had once been considered a crime punishable by death. Through this action and others administrative moves, Liuvigild reassured his rule and when he had secured the capital, began a new campaign, during which he conquered the district of Sabaria, the province of Braganza, and Torre de Moncorvo along the Suebian frontier.

Gregory of Tours contended that Liuvigild exceeded his power when he divided the kingdom between his two sons, but it is feasible that he took this action to weaken the authority of the nobles from amid both the Visigoths and the Spanish-Romans. Whatever Liuvigild's original motivation was or whether this move to empower his children can be viewed as beyond his authority, the act stirred several insurrections— first among the Cantabri, then amid the people of Cordova and Asturia, and lastly in Toledo and Evora—at a time when the Suebi and Byzantines were planning attacks against Liuvigild. Undeterred by these manifold threats, he attended to the concerns within his empire and with his son Reccared's assistance, he succeeded in subduing the rebels who rose to oppose him. In doing so, he seized Ammaia, the capital of the Cantabri; he took the Asturian stronghold, Saldania (Saldana); he also successfully quelled insurgent activities in Toledo and Evora (Aebura Carpetana). Not given to mercy—in every rebellious region—he sealed his victories by exacting terrible punishments upon his erstwhile enemies. Sometime during this campaign in 576, Liuvigild's predominance led to the Suebian king Miro rapidly agreeing to a treaty which included paying tribute, if but for a short period.

In 577 Liuvigild marched into Orespeda, a region in southeastern Spain, and after suppressing an immediate revolt "of the common people" added this province to his kingdom. Upon the conclusion of these campaigns, Liuvigild celebrated his victories by founding a city in Celtiberia, which he named Recopolis for his son Reccared. In 582 Liuvigild then went on to capture Mérida, which had been under the political control of its popular bishop Masona since the early 570s. (Note: Masona was soon after exiled for three years, possibly in the context of the rebellion of Hermenegild.) Over the course of his reign, Liuvigild had conquered most of the peninsula.

=== Hermenegild's Revolt ===
In 579, Hermenegild had converted to orthodox Christianity, persuaded by his Frankish wife Ingunthis and Leander, bishop of Seville. After his father, who considered this conversion treason, insisted on appointing Arians as bishops, Baetica revolted under the leadership of Hermenegild, who was supported by the orthodox bishops. Throughout the period of Hermenegild's religiously motivated sedition, Liuvigild sought various forms of theological reconciliation, including the acknowledgement of Catholic baptism (not forcing Arians to undergo a cleansing re-baptism upon conversion), tolerating the Catholic veneration of relics and saints, and softening the distinction between Christ and the Father by declaring them equals as opposed to the traditional Arian position, which held Christ as subordinate within the tripartite relationship. These unifying religious efforts came to naught since Arianism was losing its intellectual appeal.

Hermenegild's revolt worried Liuvigild, as it raised concerns about his relations with the Merovingians; namely, since Ingund's brother, Childebert II—who had gained power following the death of his Merovingian father, Sigibert I—began taking an interest in the developments of his sister's realm. Attempting to counteract any possible Frankish support for the Hermengild's rebellion, Liuvigild pressed for a marriage between Reccared and Chilperic's daughter, Rigunth, which proved diplomatically useless upon Chilperic's death.

During this father-son feud, Hermengild presented himself as a victim as he tried to forge alliances in the name of Catholicism. Despite having Pope Gregory's tacit support, contemporary Catholic writers—including Isidore of Seville and Gregory of Tours—expressed little to no sympathy for Hermenegild's revolt against his father. When the Byzantines failed to send aid for the revolt, Liuvigild besieged and took Seville and in 584, banished his son to Valencia, where in 585, he was later murdered. Leander of Seville was also banished and later canonized as a saint. Gregory of Tours records that after Hermenegild's fall, his wife Ingund and their young son Athanagild were sent toward Constantinople by way of Byzantine Africa, but Ingund died during the journey (probably at Carthage). The boy continued on to Constantinople, but is never heard from again after 587. (Note: There is evidence by way of contemporary diplomatic letters Epistolae Austrasica) dating from 584–588 that indicate Brunhild wrote to Emperor Maurice and to Athanagild at the Byzantine court—which pins Athanagild's custody to Maurice’s reign.) Pope Gregory held Liuvigild responsible for Hermengild's death and asserted that the latter died for his conviction in the Catholic faith.

== Later years ==
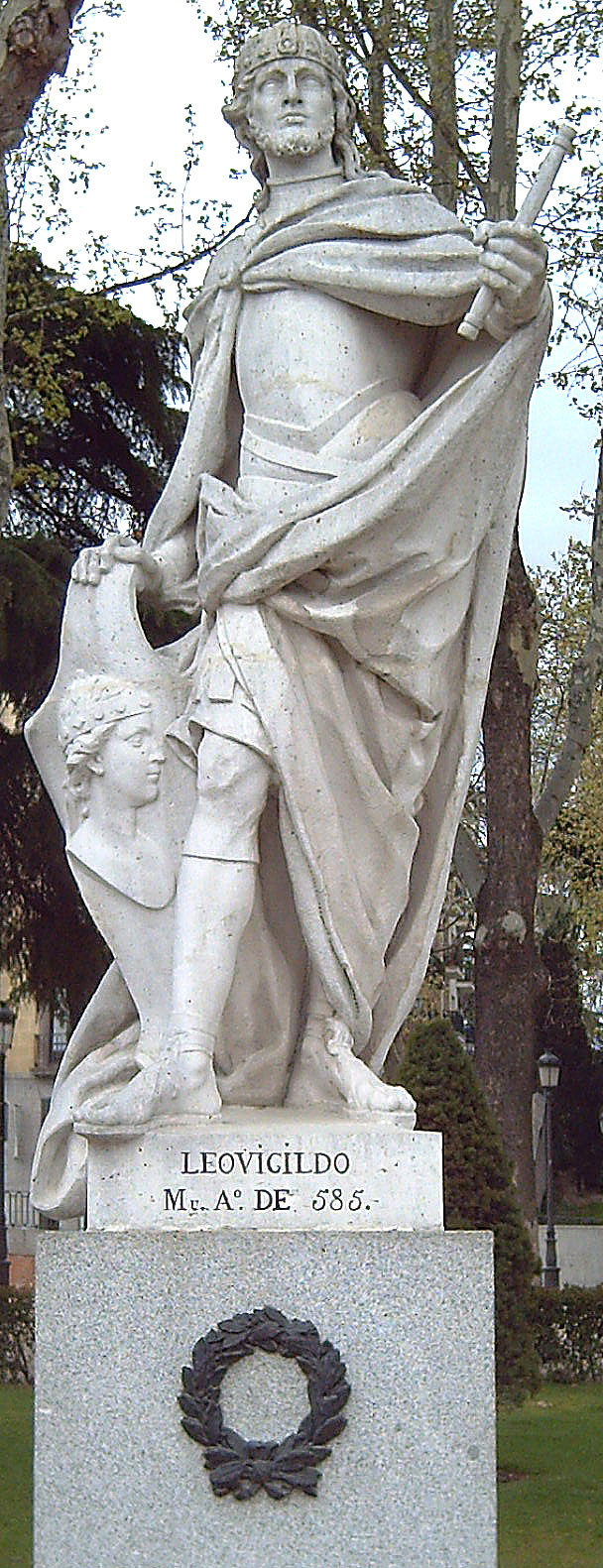
Statue of Liuvigild in Madrid (Felipe del Corral), 1750–1753

In 585, Liuvigild conquered the Suebi peoples, bringing an end to some forty-years of their independence in Spain. Despite several failed attempts by the Suebi to rebel against the Visigoths, Liuvigild eventually forced them to swear their fidelity. By the end of his reign, only the Basque lands (Note: The Basques have never been subdued by anyone.) and two small southern territories of the Byzantine Empire made up the non-Visigothic parts of Hispania. However, despite his best efforts, Liuvigild was unable to establish common religious ground between Arian Christians and those of the Catholic majority. Liuvigild's last year was troubled by open war with the Franks along his northernmost borders. But overall, Liuvigild was one of the more effective Visigothic kings of Hispania, the restorer of Visigothic unity, ruling from his capital newly established at Toledo, where he settled toward the end of his reign. (From this, the Hispanic Visigothic monarchy is sometimes called the "Kingdom of Toledo"). While successful, Liuvigild attained unity and royal authority only through conquest.

According to Gregory of Tours, Liuvigild fell ill in 586 and on his deathbed repented, wept for seven days and "embraced the Catholic faith" before he "gave up the ghost." (Note: Isidore of Seville records that he ruled for eighteen years and died a natural death in Toledo "in the era 624 (586)". See: Historia de regibus Gothorum, Vandalorum et Suevorum, 51–52.) He was succeeded by his second son Reccared, who converted to Catholic Christianity in 589 and brought religious and political unity between the Visigoths and their subjects.

=== Visigothic legacy ===
The Visigoths in Hispania considered themselves the heirs of western Roman imperial power, not its enemies. Signs of this can be seen in their mimicry of Roman bureaucratic and administrative norms, such as tax collection and the institution of Roman-based laws. Further evidence of Visigothic affinity for all things Roman included the reestablishment of imperial style by Liuvigild, who recreated the royal regalia. Under Liuvigild, Spain was essentially unified and according to historian Chris Wickham, the "most Roman-influenced legislation of any of the barbarian kingdoms" was enacted. Throughout his reign, Liuvigild tried to find a compromise solution between Arian Christianity and Catholicism to no avail. However, important if not permanent changes in the Spanish realm came when Liuvigild's son Reccared aggressively promoted the Catholic faith at the expense of Arian Christianity, whereby he made Catholicism the official religion of the entire kingdom in 589.

Later successors to Liuvigild included the likes of King Chindasuinth (642–653) and his son Recceswinth (653–672), both of whom reformed Visigothic laws and legal codes that essentially eliminated the distinction between Romans and Goths and which permitted intermarriage between the two peoples. Challenge to Visigothic rule came abruptly in the form of Muslim Berbers led by Umayyad commander Tariq, whose forces defeated the Visigothic King Roderic in 711 and by 725, the Visigothic kingdom in Hispania was fully overwhelmed by Muslim invaders.

== Bibliography ==
- Altamira, Rafael (1913). "Spain under the Visigoths". In J.B. Bury; H. M. Gwatkin; J.P. Whitney (eds.). The Cambridge Medieval History. Vol. 2, The Rise of the Saracens and the Foundation of the Western Empire. New York: The Macmillan Company. OCLC 716605555.
- Britannica. "Leovigild: Visigothic Ruler, Reformer & Conqueror". Britannica.
- Collins, Roger (1995). Early Medieval Spain: Unity in Diversity, 400–1000. London: Macmillan. ISBN 978-1-34924-135-4.
- Collins, Roger (2004). Visigothic Spain, 409–711. Malden, MA: Blackwell Publishing. ISBN 978-0-47075-461-0.
- Davis, R.H.C. (2005). A History of Early Medieval Europe. London and New York: Routledge. ISBN 978-0-582-78462-8.
- Frassetto, Michael (2003). Encyclopedia of Barbarian Europe: Society in Transformation. Santa Barbara, CA: ABC-CLIO. ISBN 978-1-57607-263-9.
- Goffart, Walter (1957). "Byzantine Policy in the West under Tiberius II and Maurice: The Pretenders Hermenegild and Gundovald (579–585)". Traditio. 13: 73–75. doi:10.1017/S0362152900004653. JSTOR 27830291.
- Goffart, Walter (2006). Barbarian Tides: The Migration Age and the Later Roman Empire. Philadelphia: University of Pennsylvania Press. ISBN 978-0-81222-105-3.
- Gregory of Tours (1974). The History of the Franks. Translated by Lewis Thorpe. New York: Penguin Books. ISBN 978-0-14044-295-3.
- Gundlach, Wilhelm, ed. (1892). Epistolae Merowingici et Karolini aevi I. Monumenta Germaniae Historica, Epistolae (in Latin). Vol. 3. Berlin: Weidmann.
- Heather, Peter (1998). The Goths. Oxford: Blackwell. ISBN 978-0-63120-932-4.
- John of Biclaro (1990). Conquerors and Chroniclers of Early Medieval Spain. Translated by Kenneth Baxter Wolf. Liverpool: Liverpool University Press. ISBN 978-0-85323-554-5.
- López, Gisela Ripoll (1998). "The Arrival of the Visigoths in Hispania: Population Problems and the Process of Acculturation". In Walter Pohl; Helmut Reimitz (eds.). Strategies of Distinction: The Construction of Ethnic Communities, 300–800. Leiden and Boston: Brill. ISBN 978-9-00410-846-2.
- McKitterick, Rosamond (2001). The Early Middle Ages: Europe, 400–1000. Oxford and New York: Oxford University Press. ISBN 978-0-19873-172-6.
- Wallace-Hadrill, J. M. (2004). The Barbarian West, 400–1000. Malden, MA: Wiley-Blackwell. ISBN 978-0-63120-292-9.
- Wickham, Chris (2005). Framing the Early Middle Ages: Europe and the Mediterranean, 400–800. Oxford; New York: Oxford University Press. OCLC 1025811203.
- Wickham, Chris (2016). Medieval Europe. New Haven and London: Yale University Press. ISBN 978-0-30020-834-4.
- Wilentz, Sean (1999). Rites of Power: Symbolism, Ritual, and Politics since the Middle Ages. Philadelphia: University of Pennsylvania Press. ISBN 978-0-81221-695-0.
- Williams, Mark (2004). The Story of Spain. San Mateo, CA: Golden Era Books. ISBN 978-0-97069-692-2.
- Wolfram, Herwig (1997). The Roman Empire and its Germanic Peoples. Berkeley and Los Angeles: University of California Press. ISBN 0-520-08511-6.
- Wood, Ian (1994). The Merovingian Kingdoms, 450–751. London and New York: Longman. ISBN 0-582-49372-2.

Regnal titles
Preceded by Athanagild	King of the Visigoths; 568 – 21 April 586 with Liuva I (568–573)	Succeeded by Reccared I
