= Liuva I =

Visigothic king

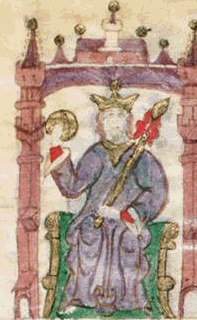
- Posthumous portrait of Liuva, painted in 1095

King of the Visigoths
- Reign: c. December 567 – 572/573, 571–572 or 573
- Predecessor: Athanagild
- Successor: Liuvigild
- Died: 572/573, 571–572 or 573
- Religion: Arianism

Liuva I (died 572/573, 571–572 or 573) was a Visigothic King of Hispania and Septimania.

== Reign ==
He was made king at Narbonne following the death of Athanagild in December 567. Roger Collins notes this was the first time a Visigothic king is mentioned in the north-eastern region of the realm since 531, when Amalaric was murdered. He suggests Liuva's coronation near the border with the Franks was because of renewed threats from that neighbor; under Guntram, the Franks are known to have posed more of a threat to the Visigoths. This threat would also explain why in the second year of his reign, Liuva made his younger brother Liuvigild both co-ruler and heir in 569, putting him in direct charge of Hispania Citerior, or the eastern part of Hispania.

The Frankish threat may also explain why Liuva gave shelter to bishop Pronimius (modern French: Fronime). Gregory of Tours states Pronimius had left Bourges to live in Septimania "for some reason or other". Liuva made him bishop of Agde, an office he held into Liuvigild's reign. When that monarch attempted to assassinate him, Pronimius then fled back to Gaul, and eventually made his way to the court of the Frankish king Childebert, who then appointed Pronimius bishop of Vence.

Liuva's year of death is disputed. He either died in the third year of his rule from unrecorded causes or a few years later, sometime between 570–573.

Regnal titles
Preceded by Athanagild	King of the Visigoths; 567–572 with Liuvigild	Succeeded by Liuvigild
