= Guntram Boso =

- Duke
- Born: circa 545
- Died: 587
- Religion: Christians

Guntram Boso (French: Gontran Boson), also known as Guntram the Cunning, was a Frankish duke in the service of the Merovingian kings Sigebert I and Childebert II. He was born around 545 and died in 587.

Guntram Boso was involved in the civil war (568-613) between the three parts of the Frankish kingdom: the eastern part, ruled by Sigebert and his son Childebert, the western part, ruled by Chilperic, and the former Burgundian kingdom, ruled by King Guntram. He fought against Thibert, Chilperic's first son, then became a companion in the adventures of Meroveta, the king's second son. He introduced Gondoald, a pretender to the kingdom of the Franks. Hated for this by King Guntram, he was eventually handed over to the latter when the latter came to terms with his nephew Childebert. He was stripped of his possessions and put to death.

Historians remember him particularly for his military skills and superstitious nature. They portray him as a volatile schemer, particularly hated by the main source of his story, Bishop Gregory of Tours.

== Context ==
Guntram Boso (Latin: Gunthchramn Boso, German: Gounth'khramn Bosso) or Guntram the Cunning (Note: Boso may have been Guntram's nickname. The theologian Antoine-François Flobert translates it as "cunning" or "wicked". Journalist Roger-Xavier Lantéri translates it as "dreaded". Writer and biographer Georges Bordonove translates it as "cunning".) is best known from Bishop Gregory of Tours' History of the Franks, completed in 591. He also mentions him in The Book of Saint Martin's miracles and in the second part of the Burgundian Chronicle known as "Frédégaire's". (Note: Frédégaire is an imaginary name coined from the names of the chronicle's first two editors in 1598, Marquard Freher and Joseph Scaliger.)

=== Kingdom of the Franks ===
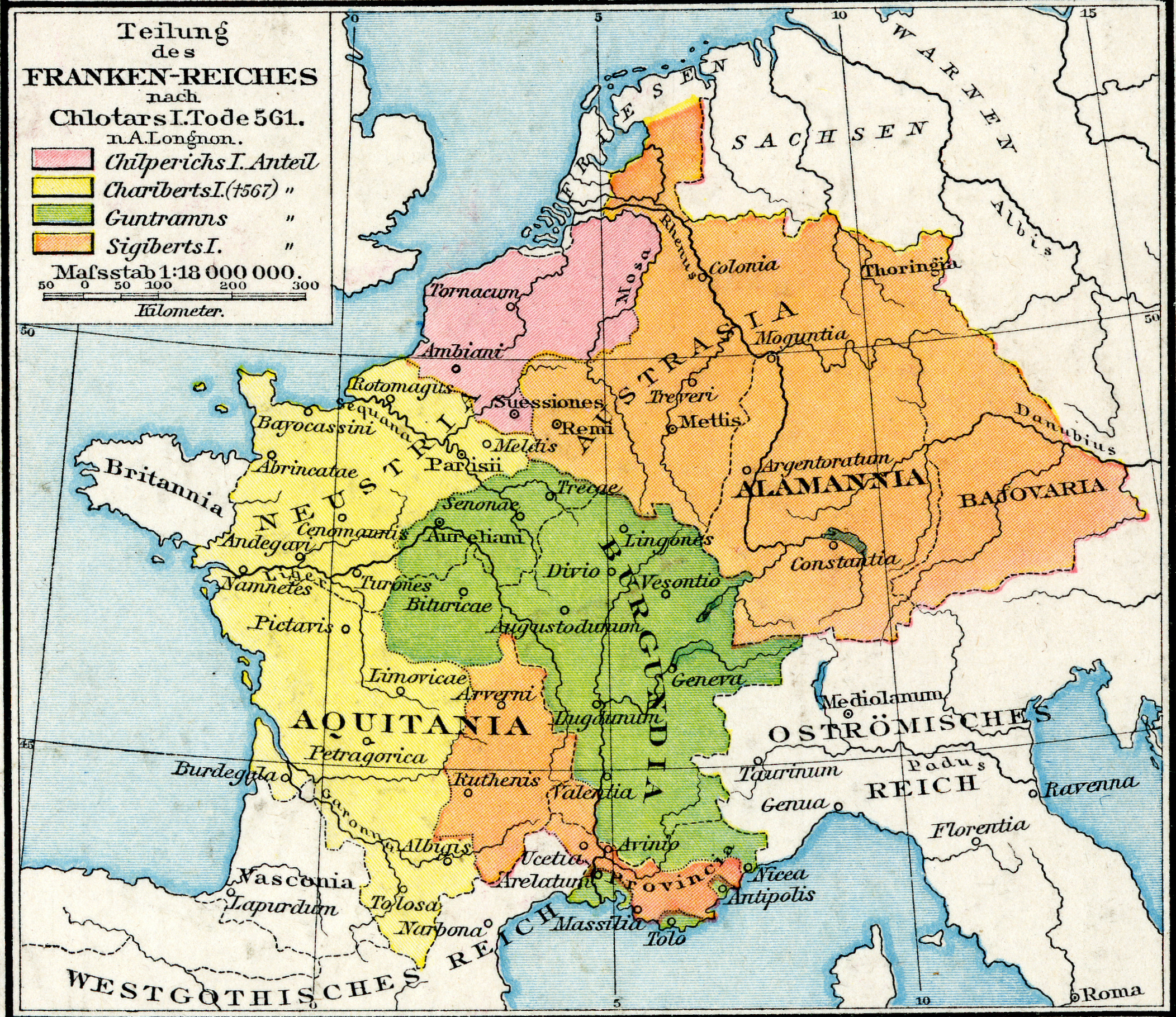
Gaul in 561, after the division of the Frankish kingdom between Clotaire's sons.

The Franks have been ruled by the Merovingian dynasty since the end of the 5th century. In 511, on the death of King Clovis, his four surviving sons, Thierry (or Theodoric), Clodomir, Childebert and Clothar (or Chlothaire) shared his kingdom. In 558, after the death of his brothers and their male descendants, Clotaire succeeded in reunifying the kingdom. The king died in 561, and the kingdom was divided between four of his sons: Caribert (or Charibert), Guntram, Sigebert (or Sighebert) and Chilpéric (or Chilperich). In 567, Caribert, Clotaire's eldest son, died without a male heir. His brothers shared his domain.

Chilperic's first queen was the Frankish Audovera, from whom he had three sons, Thibert (or Théodebert), Mérovée (or Mérowig), Clovis and a daughter Basine. In 566, his brother Sigebert made a prestigious marriage by obtaining the hand of Brunhilda (or Brunehaut), daughter of the Visigoth king of Spain. After abandoning Audovère for a servant named Frédégonde, Chilpéric asked Brunehilde's sister Galswinthe to marry him in 568. A few months later, Chilperic ordered a slave to slit Galswinthe's throat. Shortly afterwards, he married his mistress, Frédégonde. Brunehilde demanded revenge, leading to civil war between the kingdoms of Chilperic and Sigebert.

== Biography ==
=== Princes Thibert and Mérovée ===
In 575, Chilperic I decided to attack his brother Sigebert's kingdom for the second time. Leading an army, he seized Soissons and Reims. His eldest son Thibert, commanding a second force, took Cahors and Limoges. As Sigebert set out against his brother, he chose two military dukes from his staff to oppose the prince: Godegisel and Guntram Boso. The dukes assembled an army and marched against the prince. Near Angoulême, the two armies met, but Thibert's troops quickly fell apart. Thibert loses his life in the battle. Once the battle was over, the two dukes returned to Tours, the main city under Sigebert's rule in the region.

In 575, King Sigebert was assassinated while besieging Chilperic in the city of Tournai. Queen Brunehilde (or Brunehaut) was captured in Paris and exiled to Rouen. However, Chilperic failed to capture his nephew Childebert, who was proclaimed king by the men of the kingdom. One of Sigebert's followers, Gogon (or Gogo), governed the country for the child, with the title of "king's nurse".

In 576, Chilperic sent Count Roccolène du Mans to seize the surrounding strongholds, including the city of Tours. Duke Godegisel managed to escape before the Manceaux arrived, but Guntram Boso, who had brought his family to the city, was unable to do so. He was forced to take refuge in the city's basilica under the protection of Bishop Gregory of Tours. Roccolène wanted to get him out so that he could be tried for Thibert's death, but Grégoire refused by the church's right of asylum. Roccolène left the city to continue his conquest and went to Poitiers, where he died a few days later.

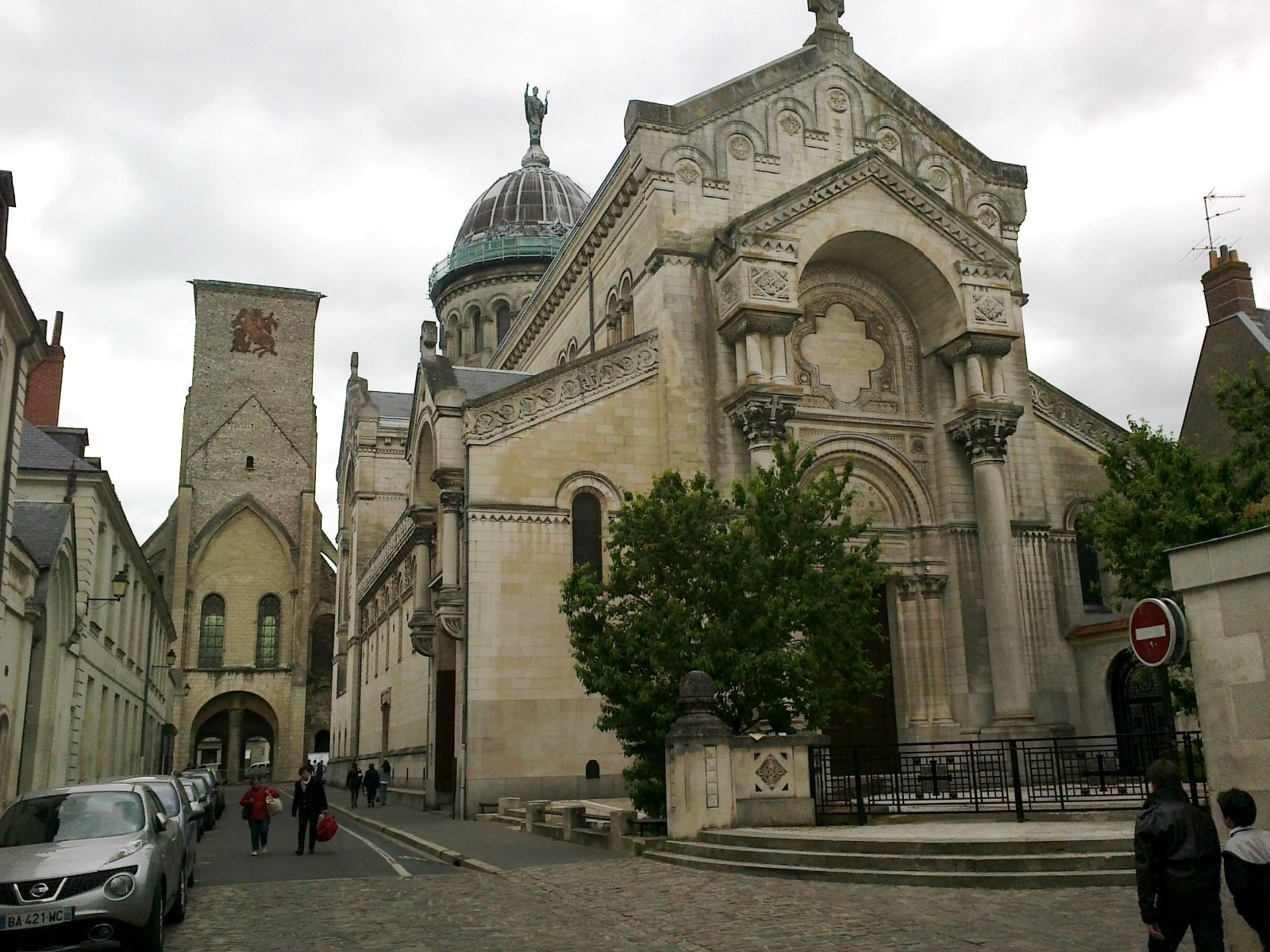
The Basilica of Saint-Martin de Tours (rebuilt in the early 20th century), home of Guntram Boso in 576.

Chilperic sent his son Mérovée (or Mérowig) to continue the Roccolène campaign. Arriving in Tours on Easter 576, Mérovée left his army and headed for Rouen. Enamored with Queen Brunehilde, he went to see her and asked his godfather, Bishop Pretextatus, to marry them. King Chilperic was informed and arrived in Rouen to separate the two lovers. He stripped his son of his arms and had him tonsured and ordained a priest. Queen Brunehilde was sent back to her son in Metz. On hearing of the prince's misadventures, Guntram Boso sent the sub-deacon Ricou to tell him to take refuge in the Basilica of Saint-Martin in Tours. Meroveius returned to Tours under the protection of Bishop Gregory. Chilperic then mobilized an army and marched towards Tours. Meanwhile, Guntram Boso consults a fortune-teller who predicts Chilperic's death, Merovee's accession to the throne, and a dukedom for himself, followed by a bishopric. Gregory scoffed at his belief in divination, advising him instead to direct his attention to God.

At the beginning of 577, aware that his future in Touraine was limited, Mérovée decided to join his wife in Metz, accompanied by Guntram Boso and their respective men. To avoid his father's army, Meroveve passed through the kingdom of his uncle Guntram. At Auxerre, one of the latter's dukes captured the prince, but he managed to escape and eventually joined Guntram Boso at Metz. Fearing open war with Chilperic, the other great rulers of the kingdom refused to protect him. However, Brunehilde helped him find refuge in a villa in Champagne. Later, Meroveve was lured into a trap by Queen Frédégonde. Rather than be captured, he asked one of his companions to end his life. Guntram Boso and Bishop Gilles of Reims are accused by some of having been involved in this plot with Frédégonde.

At the end of 577, Guntram Boso, accompanied by a few men, returned to Tours to collect his daughters, whom he had left in the Basilica of Saint-Martin. He sheltered them in Poitiers, a town belonging to Childebert. A few days later, Chilperic seized the city. Guntram had just enough time to leave his daughters in the safety of the Church of Saint-Hilaire before fleeing in a hurry. Early the following year, Guntram and his men returned to Poitiers to get the girls out but were spotted by Duke Dracolene, the city's new governor. Guntram Boso tries to negotiate but to no avail. Dracolène draws his spear and sword but misses. Boso and his friends swoop down on him and eliminate him. Guntram takes back his daughters and leaves Poitou.

=== The suitor Gondovald ===
In 581, Gogon (or Gogo), King Childebert's fosterer, died; he was replaced by Waldalenus (or Wandelin), a close associate of Bishop Gilles of Reims. From then on, Wandelène was the shadow ruler of the kingdom of Metz. Very close to King Chilperic (or Chilperich), Gilles concluded an alliance between their two kingdoms against that of Guntram. To bolster his hold on power, the bishop took care of the kingdom's leading figures. He offered Guntram Boso a position of great responsibility.

At the beginning of 582, Guntram Boso was sent by Gilles on a diplomatic mission to Constantinople on a mission to find Gundoald (or Gondowald), the bastard son of King Chlothar (or Chlothaire). Emperor Tiberius and Childebert's grandees needed a suitor to destabilize King Guntram's territory. Guntram Boso and Gondovald landed in Marseille with a rich treasure provided by the emperor. His next project was to place Gondovald under the protection of Mummolus, in Avignon. At the beginning of 583, the nobles made a pact with Chilperic against Guntram and abandoned Gondovald. The pretender withdrew to an island in Provence, while Guntram Boso and Duke Dynamius of Marseille shared part of the imperial treasury. Boso then left Marseille to return home to Auvergne. (Note: In 1998, historian Constantin Zuckerman developed another theory in his article "Qui a rappelé en Gaule le ballomer Gondovald? He believes that Gondovald was recalled to Gaul by the great men of Metz to serve as a possible successor to Childebert and new husband to Brunehilde (or Brunehaut).)

In 583, Guntram Boso went to Metz to report on his embassy to Constantinople. Once this mission was completed, he and his family headed back to Auvergne. As he crossed Guntram's kingdom, he was arrested and sent before the king, who accused him of having introduced the usurper Gondovald into Gaul. To clear his name, Boso accused Mummol of being responsible for the affair and offered to bring the traitor before the king, who accepted the deal, but kept one of Boso's sons as a hostage. Guntram Boso recruited a small troop of Auvergnats and Vellavii and set off for Avignon via the road to Uzès. When the matter reached the ears of the great men of Metz, they sent Duke Gondoulf to stop the blockade of one of their cities by one of their dukes. However, Gondoulf forces Mummolus to follow Guntram Boso to the King of Chalon. As soon as he arrived in Auvergne, Mummolus returned home.

In September 584, King Chilperic was assassinated at Chelles. The throne passed to his newborn Chlothar, under the regency of his mother Fredegund. In 580, Fredegund had eliminated Prince Clovis, the last surviving son of the former queen Audovera. King Guntram became the strongman of the Frankish kingdoms. To counter this, Queen Brunhilda (or Brunehaut) and the great men of Metz approached Mummolus to recruit the pretender Gundoald once again. With a small army, Gondovald seized several territories in Aquitaine. In December 584, King Guntram organized a plea in Paris to divide with his nephew Childebert the lands that Chilperic had illegally conquered from their two kingdoms. Childebert did not attend in person. Instead, he sent several grandees, including Bishop Gilles and Guntram Boso. As soon as they arrived, King Guntram inveighed his namesake, accusing him of having brought Gondovald from the East to dethrone him. Guntram Boso declares his innocence before the assembly and proposes to settle the matter by a judicial duel. No one dared question his word. (Note: Zuckerman demonstrates in "Who recalled the balloonist Gondovald to Gaul?" that Guntram Boso was merely an executor in the Gondovald affair.)

=== Disqualification and death ===
In 585, King Guntram launched an army against Gundoald (or Gondowald), who was eliminated after being besieged in the stronghold of Comminges. Guntram Boso sent his servants to plunder the tomb of a wealthy relative of his wife to recover her jewels. However, the monks spotted the servants, who decided to return the goods and denounce the person who had ordered them. Guntram was summoned to a plea at Basbellain in the Ardennes. King Childebert summons him to explain himself. The duke, aware that he was risking his life, preferred to flee. His property in Auvergne was seized by the royal tax authorities. At the end of 585, Waldalenus (or Wandelin), Childebert's foster father, died. Queen Brunhilda (or Brunehaut) did not have him replaced and was thus able to seize the real power.

Guntram Boso, who had repeatedly inveighed against the queen during Wandelene's regency, found himself in a bad position. He was now politically expendable, and his arrest could be a sign of reconciliation to send to King Guntram. In early 587, he tried to win back King Childebert's favor through the intermediary of bishops, but was unsuccessful and the king ordered his death. Guntram took refuge in the church of Verdun and begged for help from bishop Agericus (or Agherich), the king's godfather. Agherich gets his godson to allow Guntram Boso to come and explain himself to him. The duke prostrates himself at the king's feet and asks for clemency. Childebert agreed to lift the death sentence and authorized Agéric to keep Boso with him until he was judged by King Guntram himself.

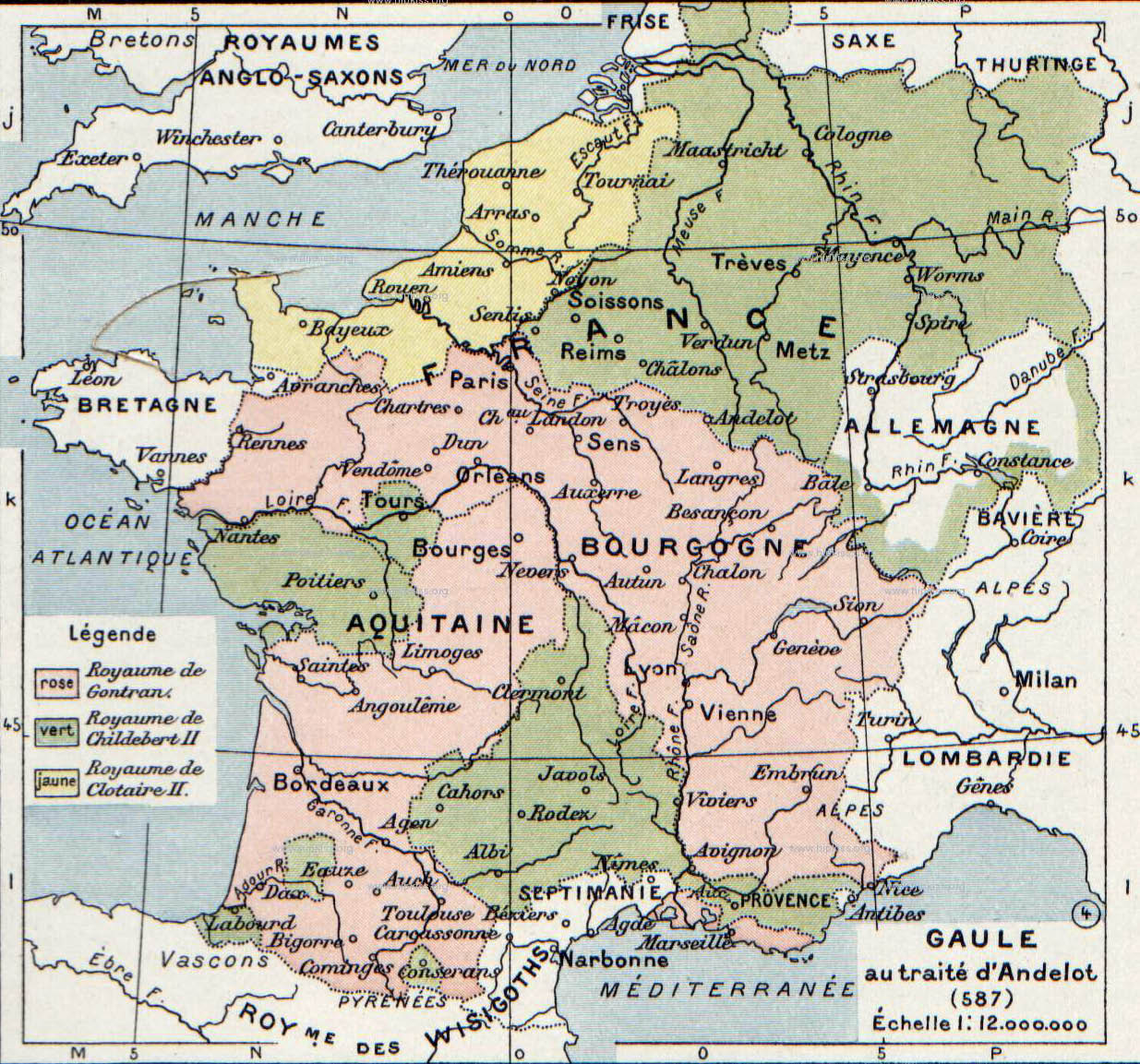
Gaul in 587, after the official reconciliation between King Guntram and his nephew Childebert.

In October 587, envoys from King Guntram arrived at the home of his nephew Childebert and asked him to meet them on the borders of the two kingdoms. The chosen location was Pont-de-Pierre, on the road between Toul and Langres. In November 587, King Childebert was accompanied by his mother Brunehilde, his sister Chlodosinda (or Clodosinde), and his wife Faileuba (or Faïléouba). He is also accompanied by Magnéric, bishop of Trier, Agéric, bishop of Verdun, and Duke Guntram Boso. The latter was then tried by the two kings without defense, and sentenced to death. On learning of this, Guntram Boso took refuge in the house where Magnéric was staying. King Guntram orders the house to be set on fire. Magnéric is exfiltrated by his clerics. Guntram le Boso is forced out. Exposed, he is pierced by several spears and dies. His wife and sons were sent into exile and his property was confiscated.

In 588, Bishop Agéric took his children to Verdun. Feeling guilty of having orphaned them, he died of starvation.

=== Character ===
Bishop Gregory of Tours, who spent several months with Guntram Boso, passed judgment on him in his Histoire des Francs. He criticized him for being "light in his conduct, inclined to avarice, inordinately greedy of other people's goods, swearing his faith to everyone and keeping his promises to no one". After his death, King Childebert's men discovered his treasures buried underground. The historian Bruno Dumézil believes that Grégoire "has only an aesthetic fascination for Guntram Boso, the kind one might feel for the baroque figure of the pathological traitor". Grégoire admits that, although Guntram is a worthy man, he is "too accustomed to perjury, and to none of his friends has he sworn an oath that he has not immediately violated". The historian Constantin Zuckerman also finds that the duke "was one of the characters most hated by Gregory of Tours".

Modern historians, such as Professor Pierre Riché, portray him as a schemer. Riché has no doubts about his friendship with the rebellious prince Mérovée. Biographer Georges Bordonove believes that Guntram Boso "came to terms" with Frédégonde and delivered Merove to her. Historian Robert Latouche finds him of "dubious morality" and "notoriously inconstant in his conduct". Dumézil confirms that Guntram was "a man whose intelligence was far more famous than his loyalty". Historian Ferdinand Lot calls Guntram "one of the most restless and ambitious characters of the time". Historian and numismatist Maximin Deloche described him as a "sad and odious character". Journalist and historian Roger-Xavier Lantéri concede that, while his versatility is mocked, he is nonetheless a seasoned leader and "has proved his boldness many times over". Dumézil suggests that Guntram Boso rallied around him a pro-Byzantine party in opposition to Gogon's faction in favor of an alliance with King Guntram and Gilles', who preferred Chilperic's friendship.

Gregory also resented Guntram's use of soothsayers and spells. Although superstitious, Guntram Boso was a Christian. In 577, during his battle against Duke Dracolene, Gregory reports that Guntram, "seeing death ready to fall upon him, invoked the name of God and the great virtue of Blessed Martin". On another occasion, as he crossed the floating bridge linking Tours to the town of Amboise, the wind blew away the boats carrying the bridge. Guntram calls out loudly for help from Martin de Tours. The wind dies down and Guntram reaches the shore. Gregory uses this anecdote as a chapter in his Livre des Miracles de Saint Martin. Aimoin de Fleury's Histoire des Francs also indicates that Guntram made a pilgrimage to the Holy Land before his embassy to Constantinople.

== Bibliography ==
=== Primary sources ===
- Frédégaire (2003). Chronique des temps mérovingiens. Brepols. ISBN 978-2-503-51151-1.
- de Tours, Grégoire (1995). Histoire des Francs. Paris: Les Belles Lettres. ISBN 978-2-251-34047-0.
- de Tours, Grégoire (2003). Le Livre des miracles de saint Martin. Clermont-Ferrand: Éditions Paléo. ISBN 978-2-84909-029-9.

=== Secondary sources ===
- Bordonove, Georges (1988). Clovis et les Mérovingiens. Paris: Pygmalion. ISBN 978-2-7564-0244-4.
- Dumézil, Bruno (2008). La reine Brunehaut. Paris: Librairie Arthème Fayard. ISBN 978-2-213-63170-7.
- Filion, Sébastien (2017). Histoire et rhétorique : Grégoire de Tours et les guerres civiles mérovingiennes. Montréal: Université de Montréal.
- Flobert, Antoine-François (1853). Brunehault : Etude historique. Colmar: Decker. p. 138.
- Inglebert, Hervé (2009). Atlas de Rome et des barbares : La fin de l'Empire romain en Occident (iiie – vie siècle). Autrement. ISBN 978-2-7467-1267-6.
- Lantéri, Roger-Xavier (1995). Brunehilde: La première reine de France. Paris: Éditions Perrin. ISBN 978-2-262-01125-3.
- Lot, Ferdinand (1948). Naissance de la France. Paris: Librairie Arthème Fayard.
- Périn, Patrick; Riché, Pierre (1996). Dictionnaire des Francs : Les Temps mérovingiens. Éditions Bartillat. ISBN 978-2-84100-008-1.
- Delaplace, Christine (2009). "L'affaire Gondovald et le dispositif défensif de l'Aquitaine wisigothique et franque". Aquitania. 25 (25): 199–211. doi:10.3406/aquit.2009.1186.
- Deloche, Maximin (1883). "Deuxième mémoire sur le monnayage en Gaule au nom de l'empereur Maurice Tibère". Mémoires de l'Institut de France. 30 (2): 439–464. doi:10.3406/minf.1883.992.
- Goubert, Paul (1941). "L'aventure de Gondovald et les monnaies franques de l'empereur Maurice". Revue des études byzantines: 414–457.
- Lizop, Raymond (1926). "La fin de Gondowald et la destruction de Lugdunum Convenarum en 585". Annales du Midi. 38 (151): 402–423. doi:10.3406/anami.1926.8332.
- Lung, Ecaterina (2015). "Barbarian envoys at Byzantium in the 6th century". Hiperboreea Journal. 2 (1): 35–52. doi:10.5325/hiperboreea.2.1.0035.
- Pietri, Luce (1983). "La ville de Tours du IVe au VIe siècle : Naissance d'une cité chrétienne". Publications de l'École française de Rome (69).
- Zuckerman, Constantin (1998). "Qui a rappelé en Gaule le ballomer Gondovald?". Francia. 25 (1): 1–18.

== See also ==
- Francia
