= Mummolus =

Mummolus (also spelled Mommolus or Mummulus), was a Gallo-Roman patrician and prefect who served Guntram, King of Burgundy, as a general in the 6th century.

He was born Eunius to Peonius, Count of Auxerre. Peonius sent his son to Guntram with gifts in order to guarantee his reappointment as count, but Mummolus used his gifts for his own request for the comital office, which he received. Mummolus attained prominence in Gaul during the first Lombard invasion. The patrician Amatus died in battle against them and was replaced in that office by Mummolus.

It was in the wars with the Lombards that Mummolus proved himself a uniquely capable strategist. The Lombards were then in the midst of an interregnum known as the Rule of the Dukes and three of their dukes — Zaban of Pavia, Amo, and Rodanus — invaded Provence and were expelled by Mummolus and chased even into Italy. His first victory was a tactical one at Embrun. This was followed up by a defeat of some Saxon raiders who had accompanied the Lombards at Estoublon. The main Saxon army, however, made peace. But when the Saxons came to the River Rhône, they were not allowed to cross, Mummolus stopping them. The Saxons paid a high price in gold and were eventually allowed to cross.

After the wars with the Lombards, Mummolus went to the aid of the king of Austrasia, Sigebert I, against the king of Soissons, Chilperic I. He successfully recovered Tours and Poitiers. He then met Desiderius, Chilperic's chief general, and defeated him in battle. By this time, he was the proven best general in Gaul. He joined the rebellious duke Gontran Boson and at first supported Gundoald as pretendent king in Aquitaine against Guntram, but abandoned that cause and rejoined Guntram against the insurrection. He sabotaged the rebels' boats in an attempt to drown them in the Rhône, but Guntram Boso reached Avignon, where Mummolus was staying, and besieged it. At the siege of Avignon, Mummolus displayed great tactical knowledge, diverting water from the river to a moat and digging holes in the bed of the moat to make it impossible to cross for the besieging force. Guntram's nephew, Childebert II, sent down an army which relieved Avignon and rescued Mummolus.

Gregory of Tours accused Mummolus of subjecting many Franks who had hitherto been free of taxation. During his wars against Chilperic, Mummolus had obtained the enmity of his queen Fredegunda, who accused him of responsibility for the death of her son Theodoric and of practising sorcery. He was eventually captured in a rebellion and ordered executed by Guntram. He left a huge treasure behind, which was consequently plundered, as his family members had mostly been arrested by the king's men.

== Bibliography ==
- Bachrach, Bernard S. (1994). The anatomy of a little war: a diplomatic and military history of the Gundovald affair (568-586). Boulder CO USA: Westview Press.
- Jones, Arnold Hugh Martin; Martindale, John Robert; Morris, John. The prosopography of the later Roman Empire. Vol. 3, part 2. Cambridge: Cambridge University Press. pp. 899, 1146.
- Sarti, Laury (2013). "Chapters 4-5". Perceiving War and the Military in Early Christian Gaul (ca. 400–700 A.D.). Boston-Leiden: Brill. ISBN 978-90-04-25805-1.

== Sources ==
- Gregory of Tours. Historia Francorum. translated Earnest Brehaut, 1916.
- Lewis, Archibald R. "The Dukes in the Regnum Francorum, A.D. 550-751." Speculum, Vol. 51, No 3 (July 1976), pp 381–410.
