= Basina of Neustria =

Frankish princess and nun

Basina (fl. 590), was a Frankish princess, the daughter and youngest child of Chilperic I, King of Soissons (later Neustria), and his first wife, Audovera. After surviving the assassination of her immediate family, she became a nun. She later helped to lead a rebellion by a group of the nuns, which became a scandal throughout the region. This event was chronicled by the bishop and saint, Gregory of Tours, who was one of the bishops chosen to settle the matter.

== Life ==
=== Early life ===
In 580, an epidemic of dysentery swept through Gaul and afflicted the king as well as killing all his remaining children, except Basina and her brothers Clovis and Merovech (who later married Brunhilda). Fredegund, Chilperic's third wife, tried to remove the impediment to her own children's succession by sending Clovis to Berny, where the epidemic was strong. This failed to kill him and she had him assassinated along with his mother, the repudiated Audovera. Basina was sent to the Abbey of the Holy Cross at Poitiers. The abbey had been founded by Radegund, an enslaved Thuringian princess who later became the wife of Clotaire I (Basina's paternal grandfather). The childless Radegund had left her husband to pursue a religious life, enjoying ecclesiastic support.

=== Monastic rebellion ===
In 589, Basina joined her first cousin, Clotilda, daughter of Charibert I, in rebellion against the newly-elected abbess of their monastery, Leubovère, whom they accused of both excessive rigor with the monastic community and immorality. On Palm Sunday of that year, Clotilda led a secession by a group of renegade nuns who left the abbey and took refuge in the Great Church of St. Hilary, where they proceeded to garner a following of men, mostly criminals. She ordered them to abduct the abbess. Forcing their way into the abbey, the rebel nuns' thugs went to the abbey church where the crippled abbess had taken refuge. They first mistakenly seized, however, the prioress of the abbey, Justina, who happened to be the niece of Gregory of Tours. Eventually realizing their error, they returned to the abbey where they successfully seized Leubovère. The kidnapped abbess was imprisoned under Basina's watch and the thugs recruited by the rebel nuns began to ransack the abbey.

The bishop of the city was so outraged by this sequence of events that he threatened to cancel all services for the Holy Week celebration unless Leubovère was released. Eventually she was helped to escape her captivity by one Flavian.

When Clotilda became too arrogant for her cousin's liking, Basina made peace with Leubovère. Things did not return to normal with this, however. Violence continued to break out in the abbey church itself, and, in Gregory's words, scarcely a day passed without a murder, or an hour without a quarrel, or a moment without tears. This caused King Childebert II of Austrasia to propose to his uncle, Guntram of Burgundy, that they send joint embassies of their bishops to deal with the incident in accordance with Church law. Gregory, Bishop of Tours, the chronicler, was ordered to go, along with Ebregisel, Bishop of Cologne; Maroveus, Bishop of Poitiers; and Gundegisel, Bishop of Bordeaux, to the commotion, but Gregory demanded that Macco, the Count of Poitou, quell it with the arm of the law first. The secular answer being inadequate, the bishops gathered in Poitiers and pronounced a judgement which reinstated the abbess and declared her innocent of any crimes of which the rebels had accused her. The cousins were excommunicated.

=== Later life ===
In 590, both Clotilda and Basina were pardoned by King Childebert, and Basina returned to her monastery and lived there, until her death, in obedience. Clotilda, on the other hand, was granted lands by the king's mother, Queen Brunhilda, where she ruled until her death.
