= Gontran (given name) =

French male given name

- Gender: Male
- Language: French
- Name day: 28 March (France)

Origin
- Origin: Germanic

Other names
- Derived: From the Germanic elements gunþi/gunda ('battle', 'war') and hram ('raven').
- Related names: Gontrand, Guntram, Gunthram

Gontran is a French-language masculine given name of Germanic origin, derived from the elements gunþi/gunda ('battle', 'war') and hram ('raven')

People with the given name Gontran include:

- Saint Gontrand (c. 532–592), king of the Kingdom of Orléans
- Gontran Boson (c. 545–587), Frankish duke
- Gontran Cherrier (b. 1978), French baker and pastry chef, cookbook author, TV presenter, and entrepreneur
- Gontran Hamel (1883–1944), French phycologist
- Gontran de Poncins (1900–1962), French writer and adventurer
