= Austregilde =

Frankish queen consort (548–580)

Queen consort of Orléans
- Tenure: 565 – 580
- Born: 548
- Died: 580; Chalon-sur-Saône
- Spouse: Guntram
- Issue: Clotaire, Clodomir, Clotilde, and Clodeberge
- Dynasty: Merovingian

Austregilde (548 – 580), also called Austerchild, Austregildis, Bobilla, Bobile, and Austrechild in most contemporary works and scholarship, was a Frankish queen consort of the Burgundy region in the 6th century. As a woman of the Merovingian elite, Austregilde held a fairly large amount of power, yet this power was limited by Salic law and societal values. As a result, Austregilde and other women needed to exercise their power indirectly through others or through intrigue tactics to become active political players. Understanding Austregilde, the power of elite women and the nature of Merovingian rule requires an analysis of the limited sources available from the contemporary period, like that of the Histories of Gregory of Tours, as well as an understanding of the context surrounding Merovingian rule.

== Life ==
In 565, after the King of Orléans Guntram’s repudiation from his previous wife, Queen Marcatude, he took Austregilde to be his third wife. (Note: Marcatrude and Austregilde are sometimes referred to as Guntram's first and second wives, respectively, by sources that consider his first partner, Veneranda, a concubine and therefore not a wife.) Austregilde was not born into high social status. It has been theorized that Austregilde was possibly a servant of Queen Marcatrude, one of Guntram’s courtiers, or even a slave to the household of Marcatrude’s father. Objections to this marriage and the legitimacy of Austregilde's children led to the deaths of Marcatrude's brothers and the banishment to a monastery of the Bishop of Gap, both on the orders of Guntram.

Austregilde and Guntram had two sons, Clotaire and Clodomir, and two daughters, Clodoberge and Clotilde. Austregilde outlived her sons, who died in 577 of illness. The fates of her daughters are unknown. Following the deaths of Guntram and Austregilde’s sons, their nephew Chlothar II was taken in as Guntram’s son and hei r, as under Salic law, women were forbidden from the inheritance of land, property, or titles.

She died in 580, possibly of smallpox. Gregory of Tours claimed that she died from dysentery. According to Gregory of Tours, she angrily blamed her doctors Nicolas and Donat, claiming their medicines were responsible for her death. She asked Guntram to kill her doctors after her death, which he did. Gregory compares her actions to those of King Herod, who similarly died of a mysterious illness after ordering mass murder of innocents in Bethlehem. The choice to compare Austregilde to Herod demonstrates not only Gregory's personal disdain for Austregilde but also serves as a literary device to influence the reader's perspective of Austregilde. By making a direct comparison to a sacrilegious biblical person, Gregory attempts to establish his credibility while diminishing Austregilde's.

Many modern historians have suggested there is reason to doubt Gregory’s account of Austregilde’s death. E.T. Dailey suggests that Gregory’s admiration for King Guntram and general dislike for common women renders the accuracy of Gregory’s account dubious. Comparatively, Mark A. Handley contrasts the “glowing” words of Austregilde’s epitaph to question the narrative of Gregory of Tours.

== Context ==
=== Merovingian politics ===
6th Century Gaul was made up of four main kingdoms: Austrasia, Neustria, Burgundy, and Aquitaine. A precedent established following the death of Clovis, Merovingian kings would partition their holdings after death amongst their children through partible inheritance. These kingdoms were partitioned further beyond the four main kingdoms, and minor kings were established in centers of power in proximity to bishoprics. While Merovingian Kings practiced itinerant kingship, the practice of a "roaming" court to maintain their holdings, they could not be everywhere at once. The common people of 6th century Gaul rarely saw their ruler and instead interacted only with their most immediate landlord, which provided these landlords with a large amount of local social power.

Participle inheritance often served as the catalyst for conflict within the Merovingian Kingdoms. The Merovingian Kingdoms were in a constant state of war with each other, as minor kings competed with one another to expand their territory and influence. The largest of these civil wars began following the death of Clothar I in 561, when his sons partitioned Clothar's holdings amongst themselves.

Some scholars have also pointed to the role of women and bishops in igniting and prolonging civil war as well. For example, there is some evidence to suggest that Queen Brunhild had influenced her husband Merovech in his decision to start a revolt in Neustria. Chilperic did not suspect of an attempt to supplant the throne by Merovech until after his marriage to Brunhild, which may show that Chilperic suspected Brunhild of negatively influencing Merovech for her own interests. There was also suspicion thrown on Brunhild for her decision to gift treasure to the bishop Praetexatus. Although unclear why Chilperic was suspicious of this act, it may have been a bribe to support the failed rebellion. In any event, it is likely that queens and bishops influenced conflict around to better improve their social power and position.

=== Religion ===
Christianity played an important role in the politics of Merovingian Gaul. Bishops became powerful social players following the conversion of Clovis, as he adopted Roman practices such as keeping a council of bishops to advise and inform. These adoptions lasted long after Clovis, as Christianity became a staple a principle of Merovingian rule and a positive relationship with the Church was necessary for a healthy reign. In the interest of maintaining a positive relationship between Church and crown, royal power was centralized in close proximity to bishoprics. As such, Bishops used their roles advisors to influence kings in advancing their interests.

While Christianity was prominent among the ruling class of Merovingian Gaul and conversion missions continued into Gaul long after Clovis' death, Christianity did not have the same influence on the common population. The Church had a much higher focus on its reach to the elite. As such, much of the common population retained their pagan traditions.

== Impact ==
The impact of Queen Austregilde's role in society can be difficult to track, as there is little recorded evidence of her life. The predominant scholar of contemporary Merovingian history, Gregory of Tours, portrays Austregilde as a villainous figure, and even seems to rejoice in her death. In contrast, her epitaph describes her in a much more commemorative light, reading, “mother of kings, a surpassing royal wife, the light of her homeland, the world, and the court,” suggesting she had a positive presence to those in her social sphere. With such differing perspectives from contemporary sources, one has to make inferences based on the contexts of the Merovingian social and political spheres to better understand the role Austregilde held in Merovingian society.

While Gregory's histories should be taken with a fair amount of skepticism due to his bias and likely hyperbole of events, Gregory shows that elite women of Merovingian Gaul exercised their power to various extents throughout his histories.

Like Austregilde, many of the women in the histories of Gregory of Tours are portrayed rather negatively. Another Frankish queen that evokes a similar description from Gregory is Queen Fredegund. Much of her mention in Gregory’s history involves murder, debauchery and sin. Like Austregilde, Fredegund and many of the other women with poor portrayals by Gregory were from lower birth. Modern historians have questioned the legitimacy of Gregory’s depictions of these women. Dailey argues that Gregory, as a member of the social elite, likely looked much less favorably upon those who were not born into high society.

In comparison, the woman that receive a positive depiction from Gregory tend to be those from elite heritage. Among these women, Gregory writes favorably of Queen Brunhilda, with whom Gregory shared relation. Yet, accounts of Brunhilda from the Fredegar Chronicles reveal many similarities to those of Fredegund. Through the use of literary devices, Gregory shifts focus away from any evidence of Brunhilda’s wrong-doings and praises her with honor.

The contrast in Gregory's portrayal of women of different status could have a few different reasons. Of course, Gregory may have very well have preferred to share a social sphere with those he saw as equals. For a woman of common decent to enter the social circle and influence it, Gregory may have had a hard time accepting the social mobility of women. More likely, however, Gregory was more critical of women from common backgrounds because they did not have blood ties to other nobility. As the nobility and Church relied on each other to hold power, it is unlikely that Gregory would have wanted to jeopardize those relationships by diminishing women from a line of nobility within his histories. By putting his emphasis on the common women who had grown to become powerful, Gregory is still able to build his narrative of women in power without offending any of the nobility. This is supported by Wood's theory that Gregory likely did not begin his histories until after the death of Chilperic, as it allowed Gregory to model Chilperic as a bad king, likely as a strategy to advise King Guntram.

It is also interesting to note that because of their lower birth, queens like Austregilde and Fredegund likely had less connection to the organized Christian church, which had become an important aspect of Merovingian politics in maintaining cooperation with the church. As a bishop, this could also account for Gregory’s view of these women. In one instance Gregory was tried for accusing Queen Fredegund of adultery. While ultimately acquitted, having put a bishop on trial shows the extent to which elite woman could influence politics around them. Fredegund’s depicted lack of respect for spiritual authority is another sign of women’s political authority within the Merovingian kingdoms, as elite society was defined by relations between crown and church. Gregory’s writings show a clear disdain for many women of power, yet in his complaints he showed the reach the elite women held in the social and political spheres.

Gregory's depictions of women of power are intentional beyond any personal bias or feelings that Gregory may have had. Gregory depicts women as sacrilegious influences over their respective kings out of preservation of self-interest. Contemporary writers of early medieval history did not simply record events, but were explicit in their choices of what to include and exclude from the narrative. Gregory manipulates history to produce a narrative where women are the antagonists because women were able to influence patriarchal political figures to advance their own agendas. Gregory wanted his readers to see the narrative he painted likely so the Church could secure a better hold on the influence of Kings. For a queen such as Austregilde to hold more influence over the king than the Church did was a legitimate fear of Gregory. Gregory intentionally chooses to display a narrative that weakens the perception of women in power.

The Character of Merovingian rule is quite patriarchal upon first glance. Women themselves had very little to no political and social autonomy. Yet, when presented with the opportunity to marry a king or other influential figure, women were able to break the barriers of the social sphere and accumulate power. Although, this power could not often be exercised directly and required positive cooperation with their spouse and in some cases behind the scenes intrigue tactics.

As evident by The Salic Law’s code of inheritance, women held less social credit than men in Merovingian society. Yet, The Salic Law has more to reveal about the status of women in Merovingian society. In the articles regarding murder of women and children places a tangible value on the cost of a life. The fines for murdering are highest for pregnant women, lesser for woman who have begun bearing children, and lowest for women unable to bear children. A woman’s value in Merovingian Gaul came from their ability to reproduce and mother a child. Despite this, women of Merovingian Gaul saw a surprising amount of ability for social mobility. Queens such as Austregilde and Fredegund, as well as many other women of the Merovingian elite were able to marry their way into elite social status. Though social movement was dependent on the existing condition of a women’s role to bear children, it allowed for women to enter the political sphere and accumulate power.

Women of the Merovingian elite also had a surprising amount of political autonomy; however, this autonomy was conditional on the "exploitation of personal ties" to enter the political scene dominated by men. As Ian Wood contends, the power of a Merovingian Queen hinged primarily on a positive relationship with her husband, her ability to provide and raise heirs, and their control of wealth. In Austregilde’s case, while we know little of her control of wealth, we do know she satisfied the other two conditions. Providing King Guntram with 2 heirs, and surviving childbirth four times in total, Austregilde served her role as an heir bearer well despite outliving her two sons. Wood also notes that “It was not sufficient to have high born relatives, or even to achieve the status of queen; it was also necessary to have an obedient husband or son." We see from the text of Gregory’s histories that Austregilde was able to extend tremendous influence over King Guntram in the story of her death by having King Guntram follow through with her final request of executing her doctors. Guntram served to be the obedient king Austregilde needed to exercise her power. Austregilde’s positive relationship with King Guntram is highlighted by the inscription of her epitaph, which was likely commissioned by the King himself. Though it is unclear whether Austregilde satisfied Wood’s third condition in holding active control over wealth, it is hard to deny that Austregilde held power as an active political player within the Merovingian elite.

== Notes ==
Austregilde Merovingian Dynasty Born: 548 Died: 580
Preceded by Marcatrude	Queen of Orléans; 565–580	Succeeded by Faileube
