= Zaban =

Lombard duke of Pavia

Zaban, (Note: Zaban does not seem to be a Germanic name; he may have been a Sarmatian, a Bulgar, or Avar (compare e.g. Odoacer's name).) also known as Zabanus, was the Lombard dux (or duke) of Pavia (Ticinum) during the decade-long interregnum known as the Rule of the Dukes (574 – 584 AD). Pavia had been the capital of the Lombardic kingdom, but after the death of King Cleph, it became the centre of a great duchy, one of thirty-five into which the Lombard state was then divided. It seems that, as the ruler of the ancient capital, Zaban held a certain superiority of rank over his fellow duces and may have acted as their commander-in-chief.

In 574, Zaban invaded the lands of Guntram, King of Burgundy, in what is today Switzerland, but was repulsed and had to return to Italy.

In 575, Zaban and his fellow dukes Amo and Rodanus invaded the valleys of the Rhône and Saône. Amo passing by Embrun encamped near Manosque, a city of Mummolus, the Gallo-Roman general of Burgundy. Rodanus besieged Grenoble and Zaban passing down the valley of the Durance by Die, laid siege to Valence. Amo successfully subdued the regions of Arles and Marseille, while Mummolus rescued the city of Grenoble and sent Rodanus and his army of 500 to the protection of Zaban's forces. The two then marched on Embrun, plundered it, and met an army of Mummolus. Defeated, they retreated to Susa, in Italy, which was a Byzantine possession of the magister militum, Sisinnius. Mummolus invaded Italy and forced Zaban and Rodanus to return to their own duchies, while Amo had to abandon his booty while crossing the Alps. Guntram's kingdom was extended at the expense of the Lombard to include the cisalpine cities of Aosta and Susa. The Lombards thereafter ceased their Gaulish invasions.

== Sources ==
- Paul the Deacon. History of the Langobards.
- Hodgkin, Thomas. Italy and her Invaders. Clarendon Press, 1895.

Preceded by none	Duke of Friuli c.569 – c.590	Succeeded by Gisulf II
