= Rigunth =

Frankish princess (c. 569 A.D. – after 589 A.D.)

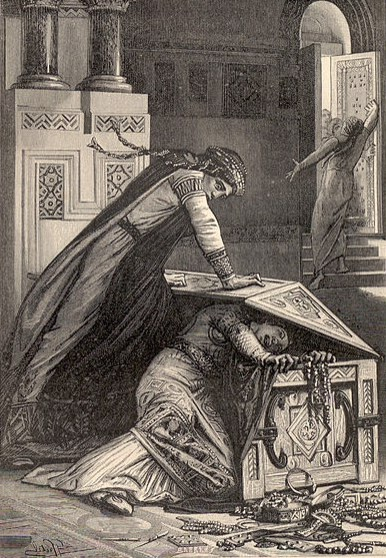
- Fredegunde tries to kill Rigunth, 1887
- Born: c. 569
- Died: after 589
- House: Merovingian dynasty
- Father: Chilperic I
- Mother: Fredegund

Rigunth (c. 569 A.D. – after 589 A.D.), also known as Rigundis, was a Frankish princess, daughter of the Merovingian King Chilperic I and Fredegund.

== Biography ==
Rigunth was the eldest child and only recorded daughter of Chilperic I and Queen Fredegund. About 583, she was betrothed to Reccared I, King of the Visigoths, eldest son of Liuvigild. In September 584 she was sent to Spain in a convoy with a large treasure as dowry. During the journey King Chilperic died and the soldiers escorting the princess took everything they could steal and fled. At Toulouse, Duke Didier seized what was left. The princess was returned to her mother in 585.

She took refuge with her mother and led a life viewed as debauched. She often quarreled with her mother who failed in an attempt to kill her in 589. Her date of death is unknown.
