= Bruno Dumézil =

French historian

Bruno Dumézil (born 1976) is a French historian specializing in the Early Middle Ages. His research and publications focus on the Western Early Middle Ages, particularly the history of migrations, networks, and ruling elites.

== Biography ==
A former student of the École normale supérieure (1996), he passed the agrégation in history and completed a doctoral dissertation entitled "Conversion and Freedom in the Barbarian Kingdoms (5th–8th centuries)". He is a professor of medieval history at Sorbonne University (since 2018) and at the École Polytechnique.
