= Gogo (mayor of the palace) =

Gogo (died 581) was the mayor of the palace of Austrasia and nutricius (also nutritius, tutor/regent) for the young Childebert II from 576 until his death.

Gogo had become a very prominent member of the court of Sigebert I by 565. It was he who headed an embassy to Spain to fetch the Visigothic princess Brunhilda, Sigebert's betrothed. When Sigebert was assassinated he, possibly at the request of Brunhilda, took over the regency for Sigebert and Brunhilda's son Childebert.

There is a letter, an important but difficult source, written by Gogo, but undated and unattached to the name of either king he served. It has traditionally been assigned to around the year of his death (581) and said to have been written on behalf of Childebert to the Lombard Duke of Friuli, Grasulf. An alternative solution put forward by Walter Goffart places it as early as 571–572 around the time of Sigebert's embassy to Constantinople. It is preserved in the collection of the Austrasian Letters.

== Sources ==
- Bachrach, Bernard S. The Anatomy of a Little War: A Diplomatic and Military History of the Gundovald Affair (568–586). Boulder, CO: Westview Press, 1994.
- Nelson, Janet L. "Queens as Jezebels: Brunhild and Balthild in Merovingian History." Medieval Women: Essays Dedicated and Presented to Professor Rosalind M. T. Hill, ed. D. Baker. Studies in Church History: Subsidia, vol. 1 (Oxford: Blackwell, 1978), pp. 31–77. Reprinted in Politics and Ritual in Early Medieval Europe. London: Hambledon Press, 1986. ISBN 0-907628-59-1.
