= Audovera =

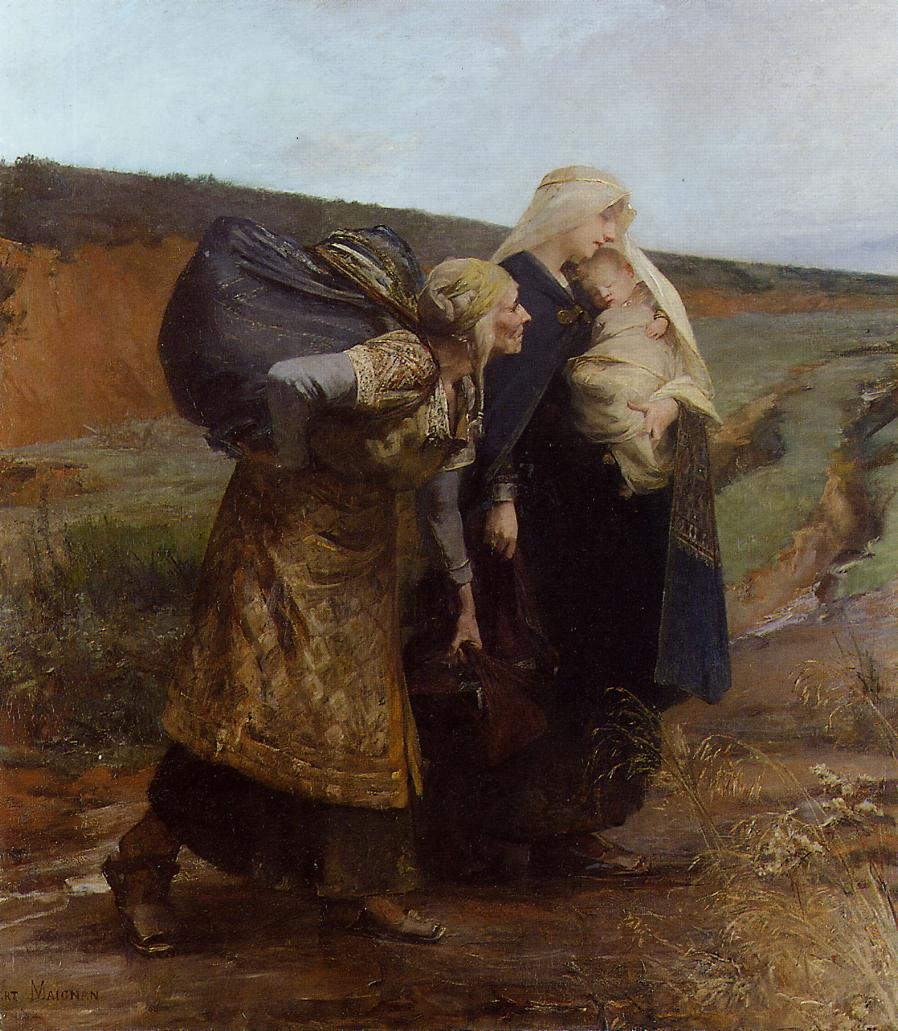
- Painting of Audovera's repudiation by Albert Maignan.

Queen consort of Neustria
- Tenure: 561 – 567
- Born: c. 533
- Died: 580; Le Mans
- Spouse: Chilperic I
- Issue: Theudebert of Soissons; Merovech; Clovis; Childesinda; Basina

Audovera (c. 533–580) was the first wife or mistress of Chilperic I, king of Neustria.

They had five children.

- Theudebert, killed in battle in 575 by Guntram Boso during the interminable conflict between Chilperic and his brothers.
- Merovech of Soissons, married the widow Brunhilda, becoming his father's enemy. Killed by his servants on his own orders in 578.
- Clovis of Soissons, assassinated by Fredegund in 580.
- Childesinda, mentioned but once in the Liber Historiae Francorum as the infant whose botched baptism led to Audovera's dismissal. Committed to the same nunnery as her mother.
- Basina, nun, banished to a convent in 580. She later led a revolt in the abbey of Poitiers in 589.

Some time before 567, Audovera and Fredegund - then a servant of Audovera, but later to become another wife of Chilperic - prepared for the baptism of Childesinda while Chilperic was away. Fredegund learnt that it was forbidden for a mother to receive her own child in her arms following a baptism, due to a canon law forbidding marriage between parents and godparents. Fredegund arranged the events of the baptism such that Audovera unknowingly broke this taboo. On Chilperic's return, Fredegund informed him of what Audovera had done. Chilperic committed Audovera to a convent in a rage. Fredegund later had her murdered in 580 to coincide with the assassination of Clovis and the exile of Basina.
