= Theudebert of Soissons =

Theudebert (circa 548-551, † 575) was the eldest son of King Chilperic I of Soissons and Audovera. Theudebert was given command of Soissons in the early years of his father's reign. When his father precipitated a war with his brother Sigebert I of Austrasia, Sigebert marched on Soissons, took the city, and captured and imprisoned Theudebert. He was out of prison a year later. On the death of King Charibert I of Paris in 567, Theudebert invaded Austrasia and razed many cities. In 575, Theudebert was killed in battle when Sigebert conquered Paris.

== Sources ==
- Van Dam, Raymond (2005). "Merovingian Gaul and the Frankish conquests". In Fouracre, Paul (ed.). The New Cambridge Medieval History. Vol. 1, c.500 – c.700. Cambridge University Press. pp. 193–231. ISBN 978-0-521-36291-7.
- Wood, Ian (2014). The Merovingian Kingdoms 450 - 751. Routledge. ISBN 978-0-582-49372-8.
