= Berny-Rivière =

- Commune
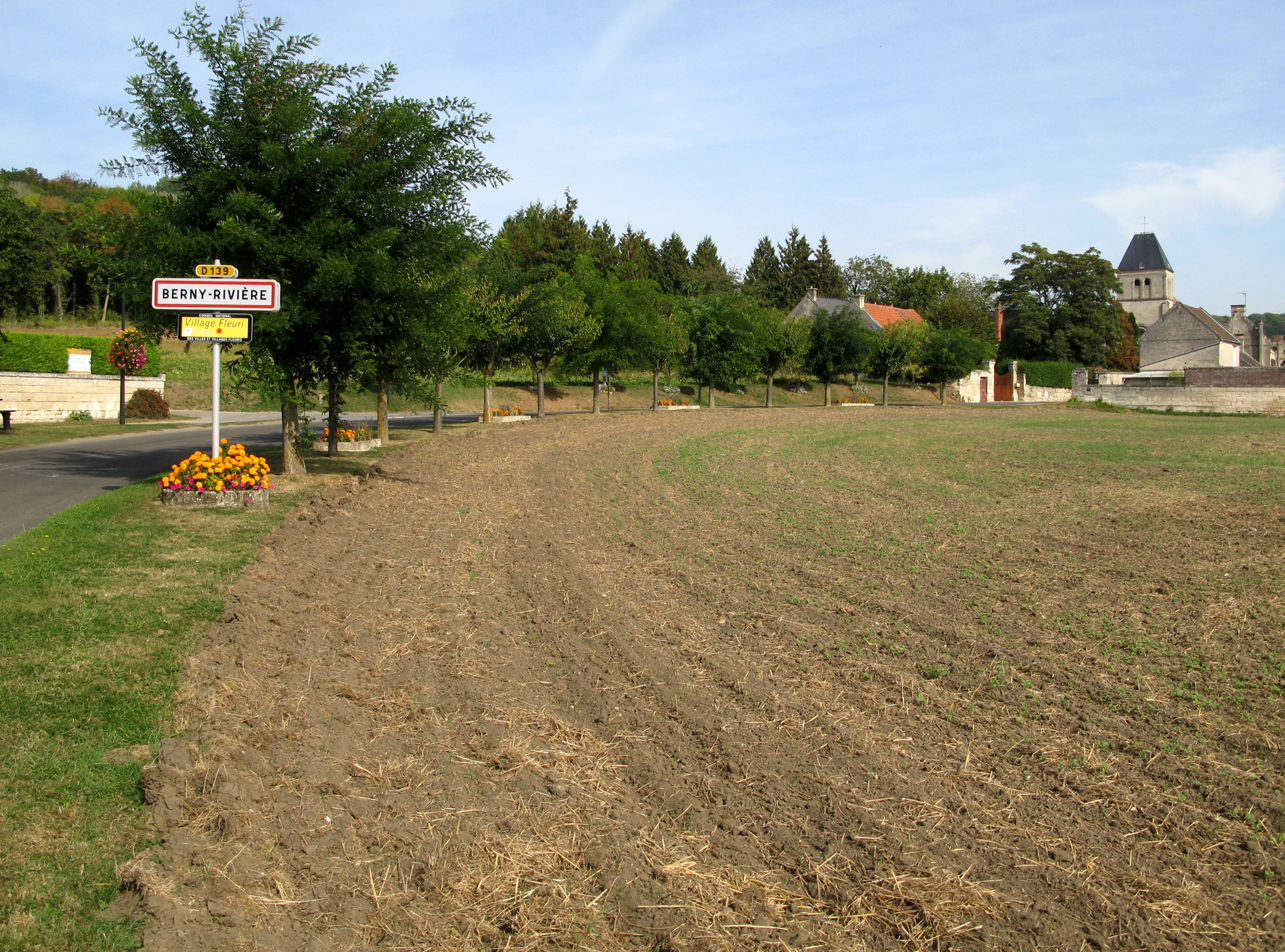
- Location of Berny-Rivière
- Location within France Location within Hauts-de-France
- Coordinates: 49°24′27″N 3°08′27″E
- Country: France
- Region: Hauts-de-France
- Department: Aisne
- Arrondissement: Soissons
- Canton: Vic-sur-Aisne
- Intercommunality: Retz-en-Valois

Government
  - Mayor (2026–32): Isabelle Pallier
- Area^{1}: 7.87 km^{2} (3.04 sq mi)
- Elevation: 49 m (161 ft)
- Highest elevation: 140 m (460 ft)
- Lowest elevation: 36 m (118 ft)
- Population (2023): 631
  - Density: 80.2/km^{2} (208/sq mi)
- Time zone: UTC+01:00 (CET)
  - Summer (DST): UTC+02:00 (CEST)
- INSEE/Postal code: 02071 /02290
- ^{1} French Land Register data, which excludes lakes, ponds, glaciers > 1 km^{2} (0.386 sq mi or 247 acres) and river estuaries.

Berny-Rivière (French pronunciation: [bɛʁni ʁivjɛʁ]) is a commune in the department of Aisne in Hauts-de-France in northern France.

== Population ==
Historical population
Year	Pop.	±% p.a.
1968	439	—
1975	446	+0.23%
1982	480	+1.06%
1990	528	+1.20%
1999	582	+1.09%
2007	593	+0.23%
2012	631	+1.25%
2017	651	+0.63%
2023	631	−0.52%
Source: INSEE

== See also ==
- Communes of the Aisne department
