= Chilperic I =

King of Neustria from 561 to 583

Chilperic I *Helparik
- King of the Franks
- Unique tremissis of Chilperic I minted in Vermand. Obverse: ·CHILPE-RICΛS B. stylized, facing right. Star in front. Reverse: ·VEROMANDIS· CIΛITV (N and S retrograde) Victory standing right, holding a cross.

King of Neustria
- Reign: 561–584
- Predecessor: Chlothar I
- Successor: Chlothar II
- Born: c. 539
- Died: September 584 (aged 44–45); Chelles
- Spouse: Audovera; Galswintha; Fredegund
- Issue more...: Theudebert; Basina; Rigunth; Chlothar II
- Dynasty: Merovingian
- Father: Chlothar I
- Mother: Aregund

Chilperic I (c. 539 – September 583) was the king of Neustria (or Soissons) from 561 to his death. He was one of the sons of the Frankish king Clotaire I and Queen Aregund.

== Life ==
Immediately after the death of his father in 561, he endeavoured to take possession of the whole kingdom, seized the treasure amassed in the royal town of Berny and entered Paris. His brothers, however, compelled him to divide the kingdom with them, and Soissons, together with Amiens, Arras, Cambrai, Thérouanne, Tournai and Boulogne fell to Chilperic's share. His eldest brother Charibert received Paris, the second-eldest brother Guntram received Burgundy with its capital at Orléans, and Sigebert received Austrasia. On the death of Charibert in 567, Chilperic's estates were augmented when the brothers divided Charibert's kingdom among themselves and agreed to share Paris and the territory around it.

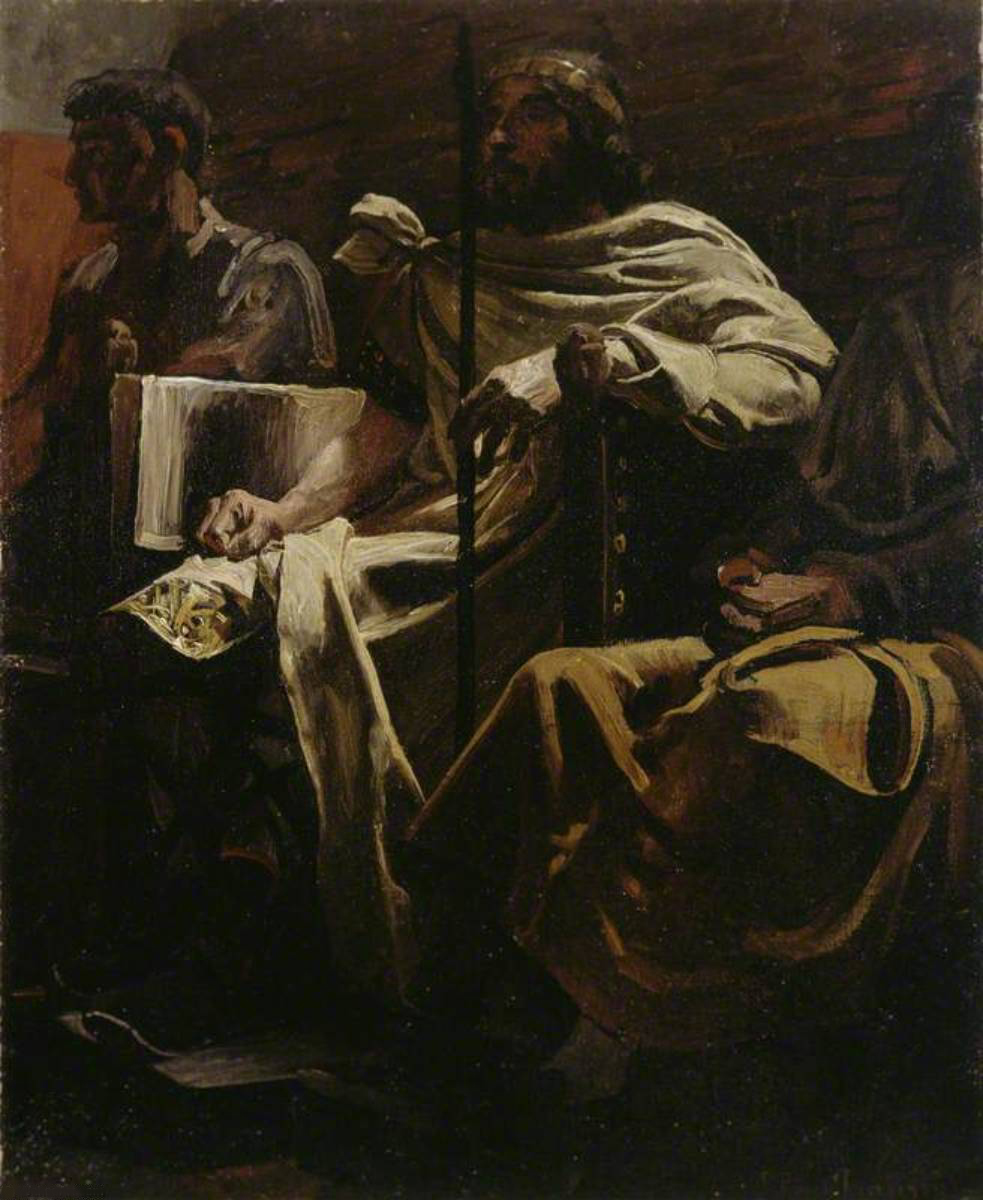
Le jugement de Chilpéric, a tyrannical portrayal of Chilperic by Jean-Paul Laurens

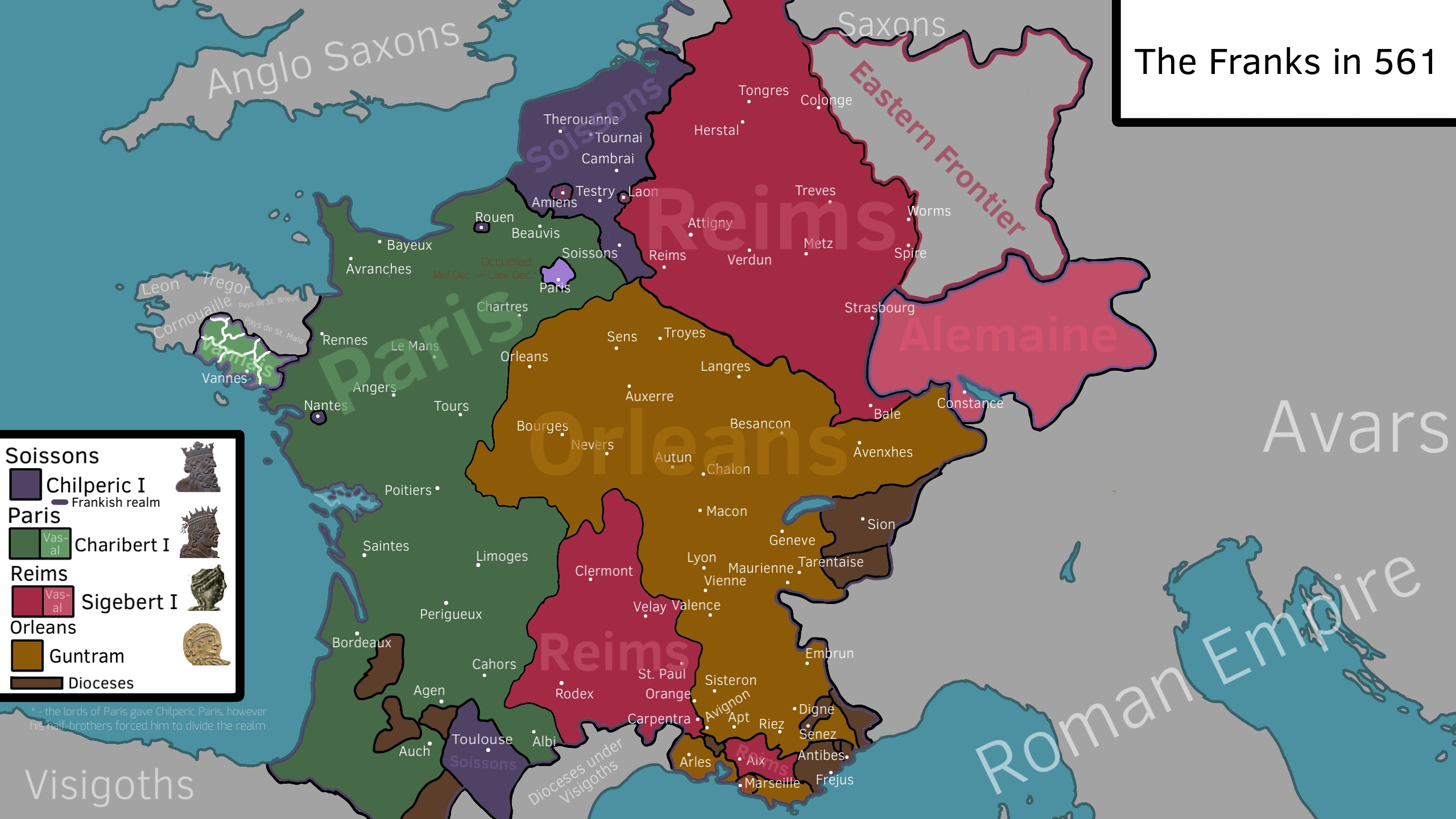
The Frankish Realm in 561, after the death of Chlothar I

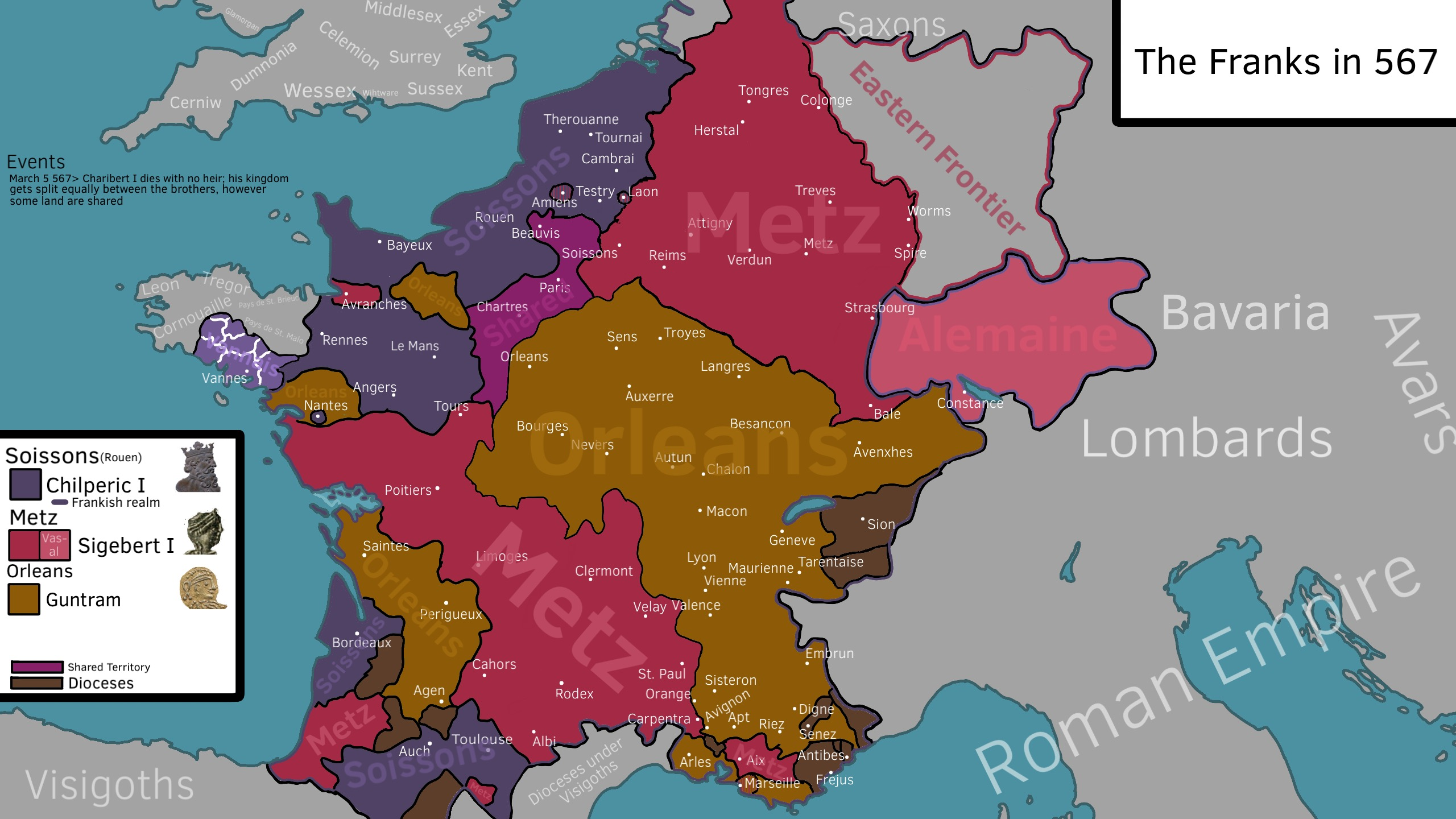
The Frankish Kingdom after the death of Charibert I of Paris

Not long after his accession, however, he was at war with Sigebert, with whom he would long remain in a state of—at the very least—antipathy. This started when Sigebert marched against the Avars and defeated them possibly in Thuringia and possibly pushed them out of the Elbe. Chilperic, seeing that his brother was far from his lands, attacked Reims and took it. Soon Sigebert returned however and took Reims and marched to Soissons, where he defeated, seized the city, and imprisoned Chilperic's eldest son, Theudebert. The war flared in 567, at the death of Charibert. Chilperic immediately invaded Sigebert's new lands, but Sigebert defeated him. Chilperic later allied with Guntram against Sigebert (573), but Guntram changed sides due to fear of a large army Sigebert gathered past the Rhine and he crossed through Burgundy to bypass Chilperic's strong defenses. Chilperic again lost the war.

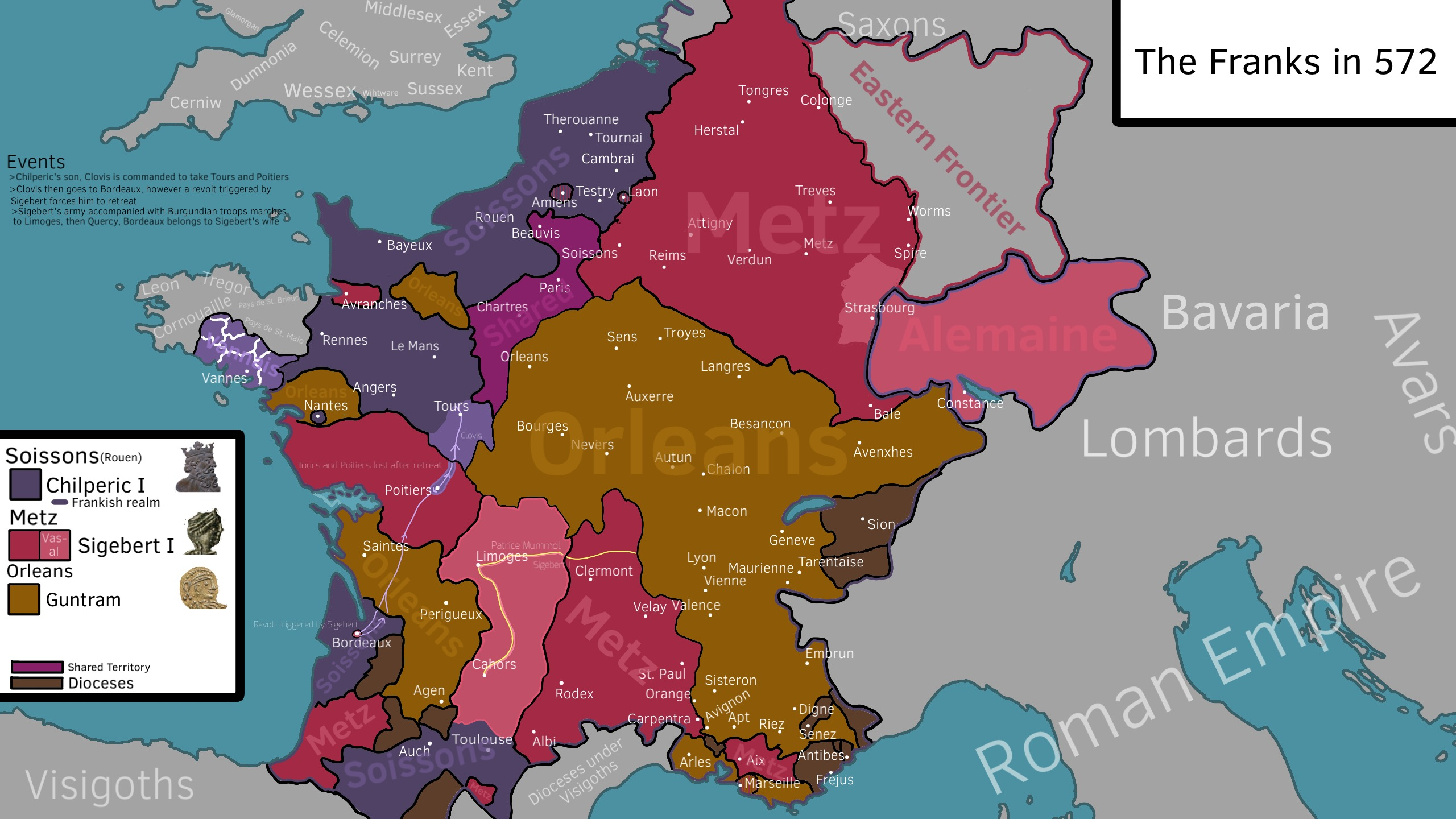
Chilperic and Sigebert I's war in 572, shows possible movements

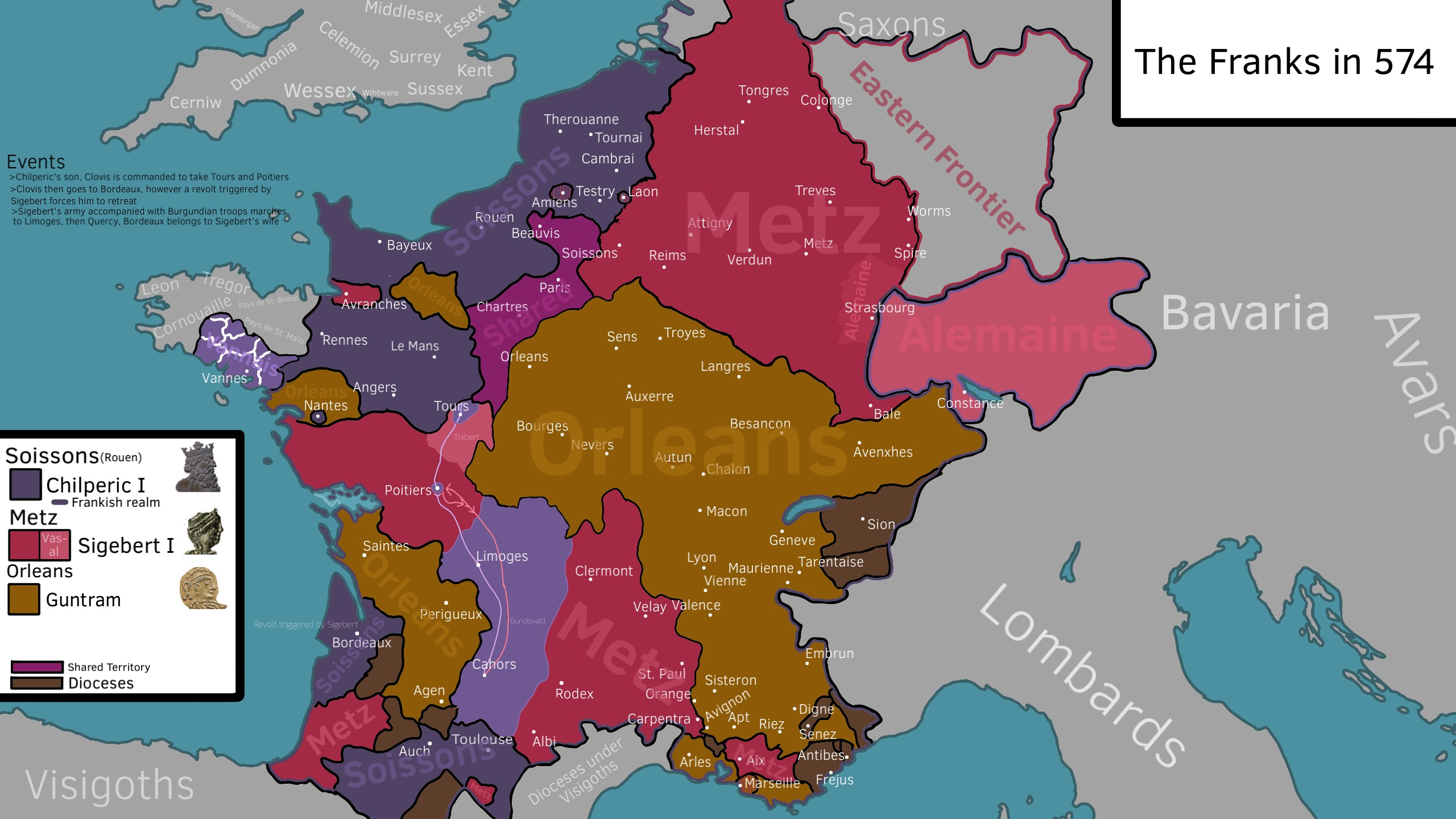
Chilperic's invasion into Reims

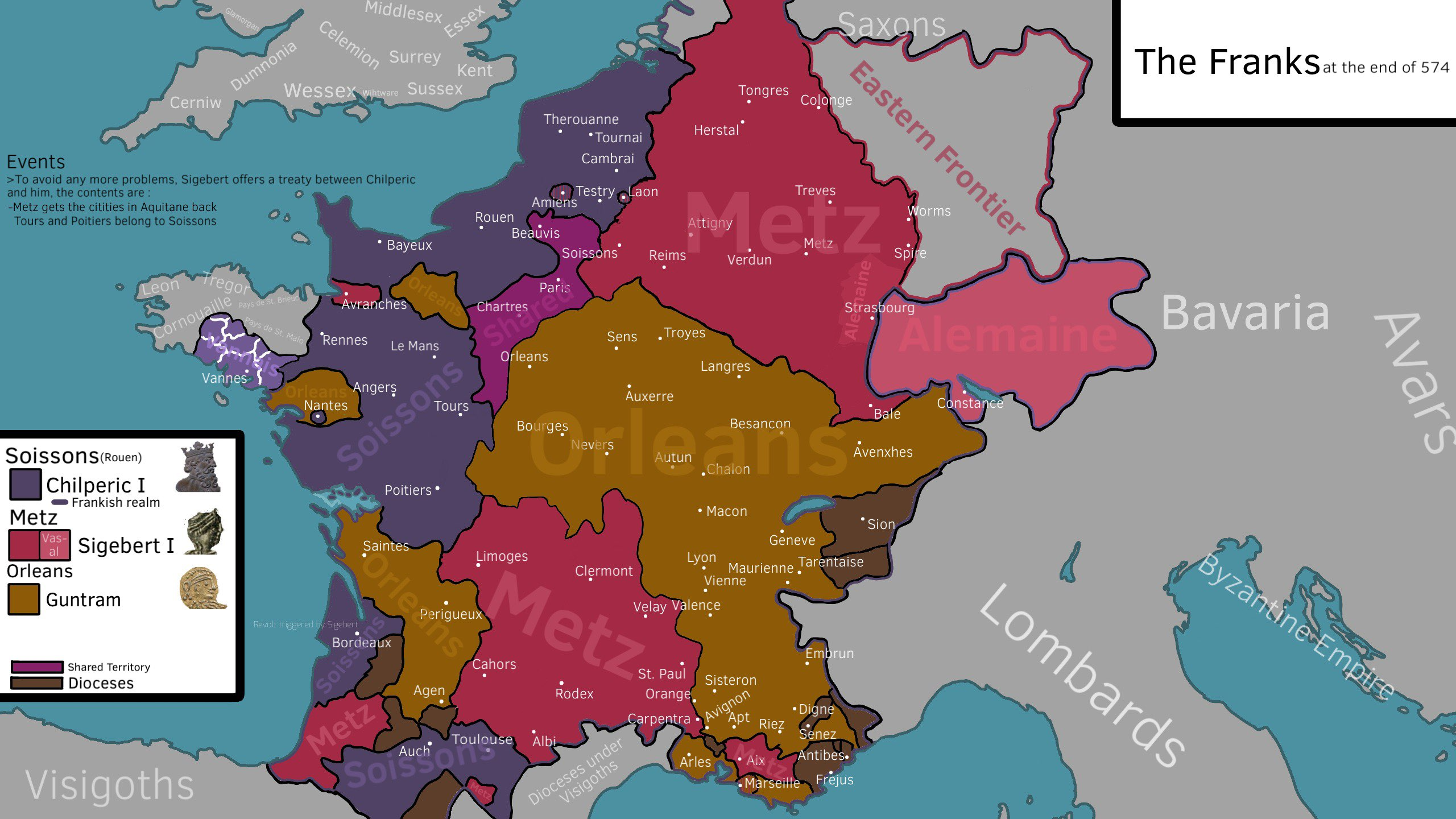
The Frankish Split before Sigebert attacks Chilperic.

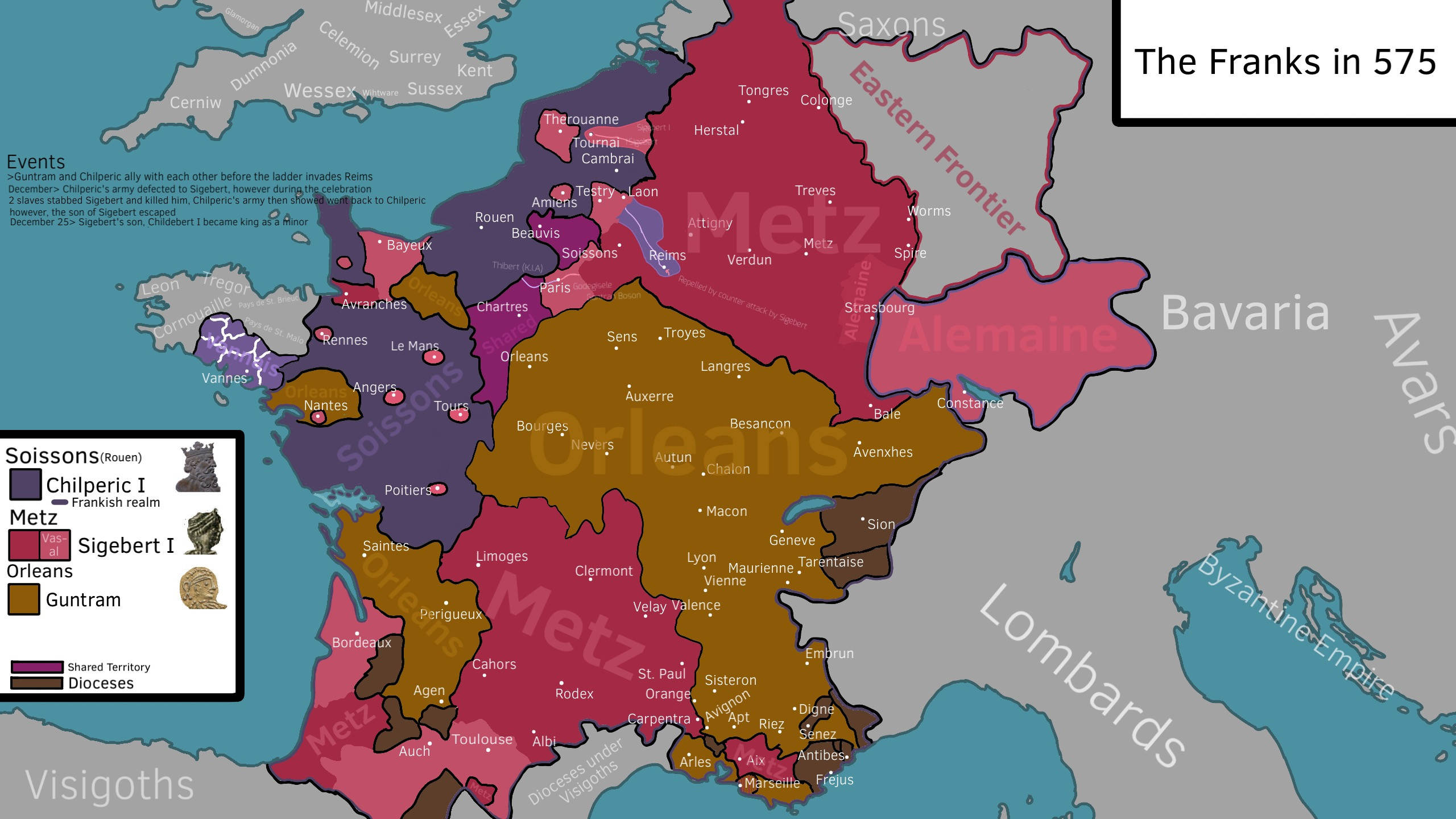
Frankish Realm 575

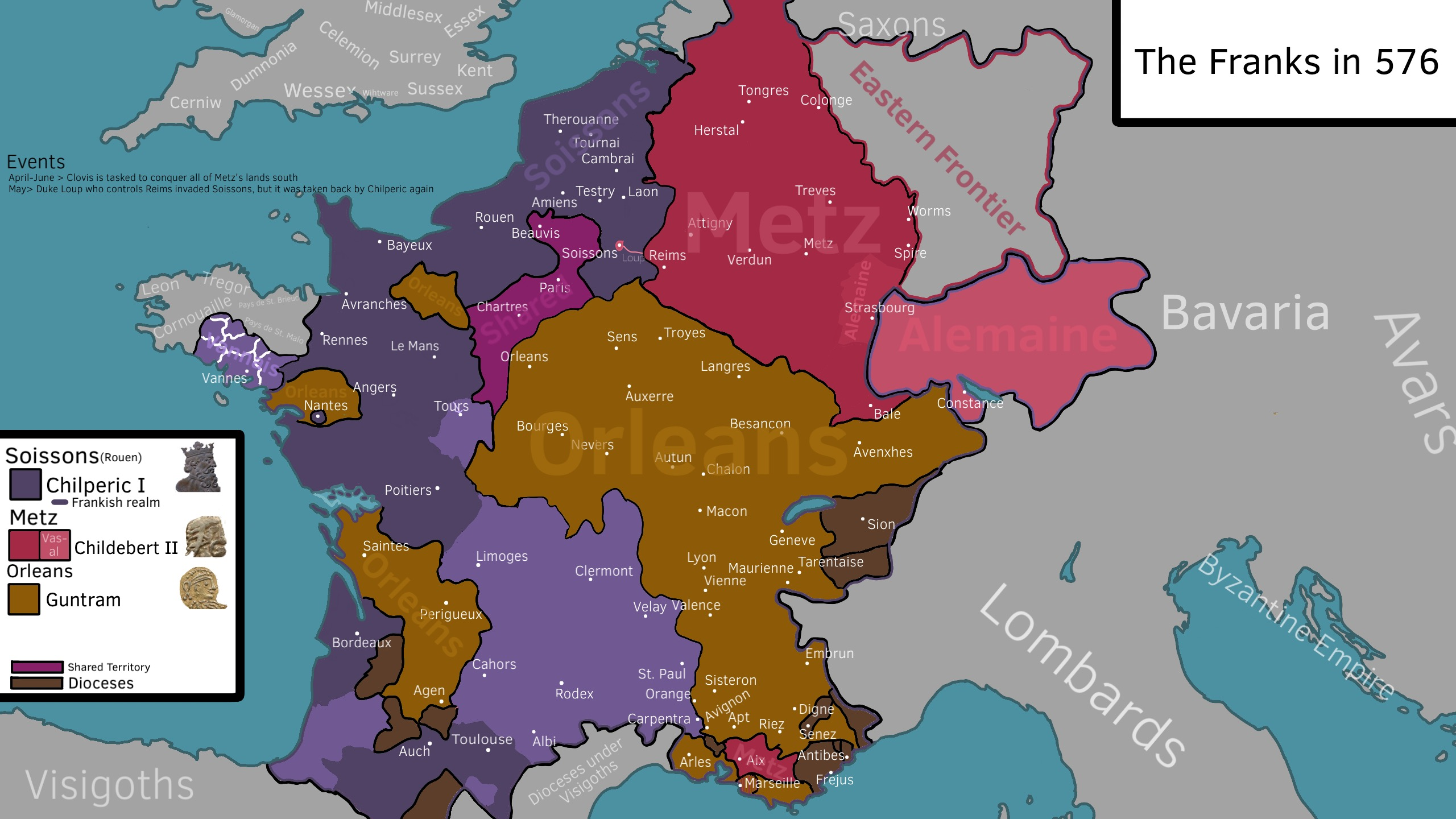
The Frankish Realm after Sigebert's death.

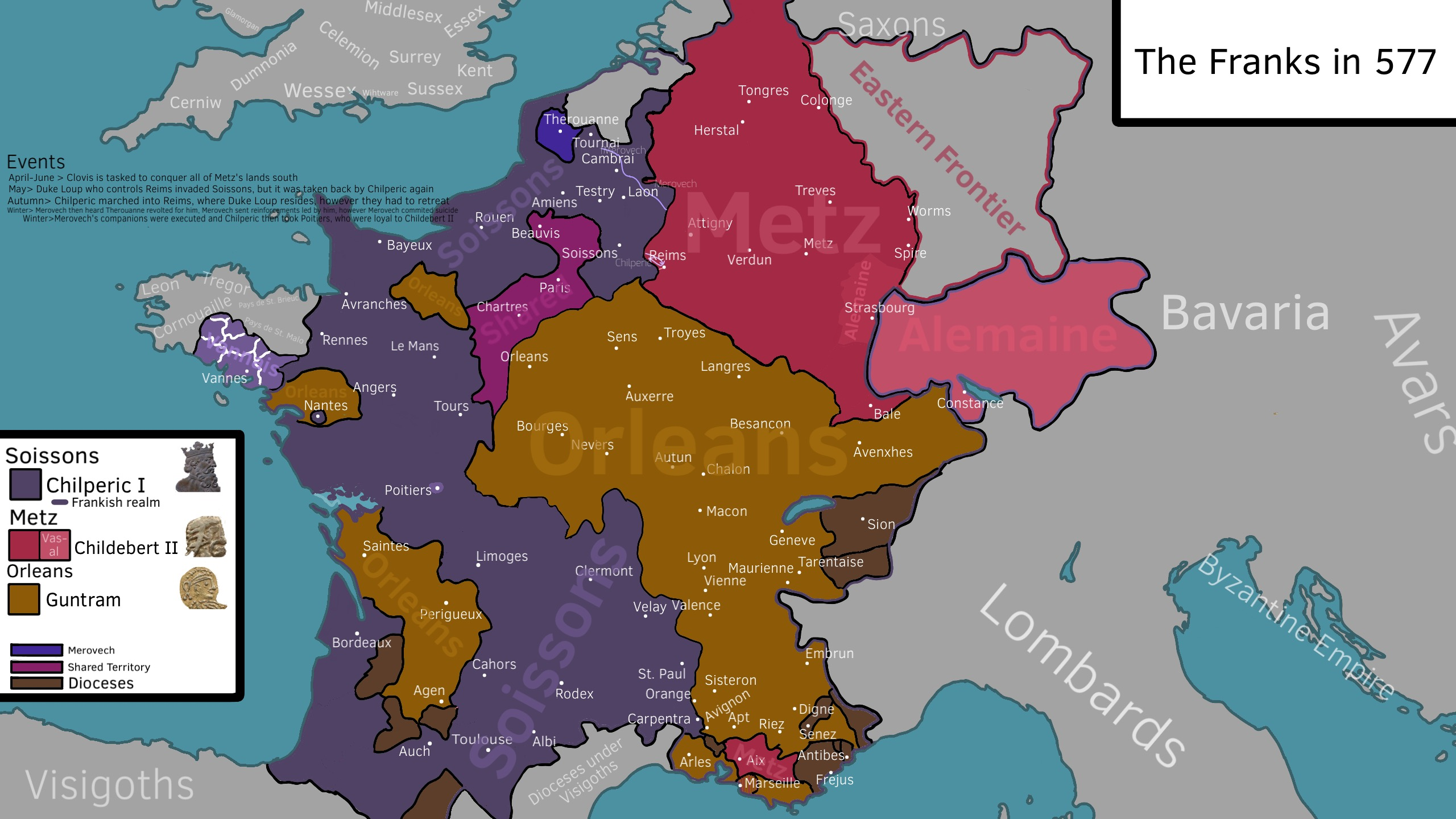
The Frankish Realm after Chilperic secures the south.

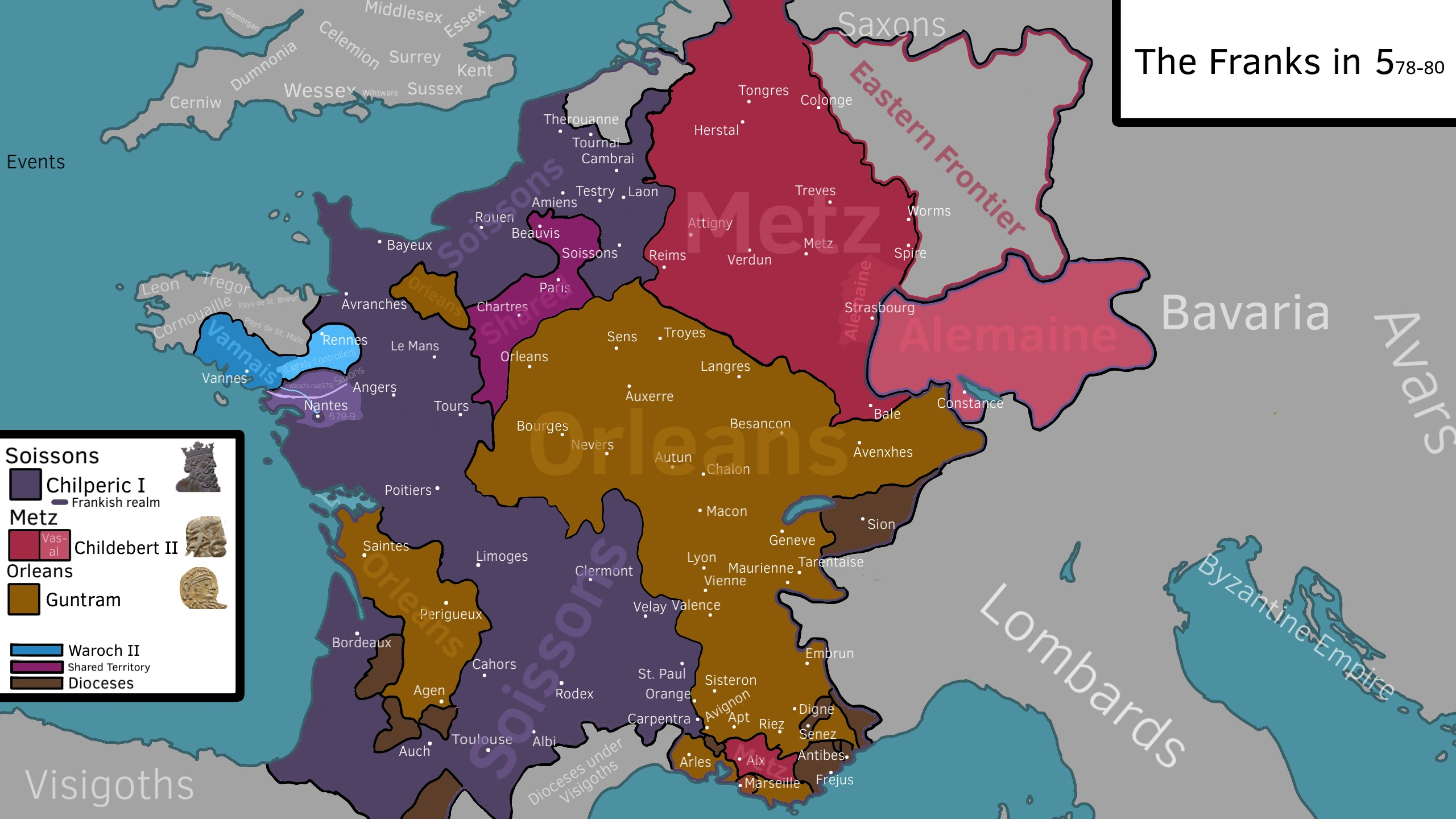
Vannias’ raids into France.

When Sigebert married Brunhilda, daughter of the Visigothic sovereign in Spain (Athanagild), Chilperic also wished to make a brilliant marriage. He had already repudiated his first wife, Audovera, and had taken as his concubine a serving-woman called Fredegund. He accordingly dismissed Fredegund, and married Brunhilda's sister, Galswintha. But he soon tired of his new partner, and one morning Galswintha was found strangled in her bed. A few days afterwards Chilperic married Fredegund.

This murder was the cause of more long and bloody wars, interspersed with truces, between Chilperic and Sigebert, usually ending in a status quo in Tours and Poitiers. In early December 575, Sigebert was struck down by two assassins working for Fredegund, who were clerks who promised that their parents would be very wealthy, as she knew this move was very risky. At the very moment when he had Chilperic at his mercy, as he was besieged in Tournai and Rouen and Thibert, a son of Chilperic was killed near Paris while Sigebert illegally entered and seized the city. Chilperic then made war with the protector of Sigebert's wife and son, Guntram. Chilperic got the loyalty from the nobles who've sided with Sigebert, took from Austrasia Tours and Poitiers and some places in Aquitaine like Saintes and the territory in Auvergene which a large battle was done against Mummol, who was serving under Guntram., and fostered discord in the kingdom of the east during the minority of Childebert II.

In 578, Chilperic sent an army to fight the Breton ruler Waroch II of the Bro-Wened along the Vilaine. The Frankish army consisted of units from the Poitou, Touraine, Anjou, Maine and Bayeux. The Baiocassenses (men from Bayeux) were Saxons and they in particular were routed by the Bretons. The armies fought for three days before Waroch submitted, did homage for Vannes, sent his son as a hostage, and agreed to pay an annual tribute. He subsequently broke his oath but Chilperic's dominion over the Bretons was relatively secure, as evidenced by Venantius Fortunatus's celebration of it in a poem.

Most of what is known of Chilperic comes from The History of the Franks by Gregory of Tours. Gregory detested Chilperic, calling him "the Nero and Herod of his time" (VI.46): he had provoked Gregory's wrath by wresting Tours from Austrasia, seizing ecclesiastical property, and appointing as bishops counts of the palace who were not clerics. Gregory also objected to Chilperic's attempts to teach a new doctrine of the Trinity, although some scholars dispute the extent to which Gregory disliked Chilperic.

According to Gregory of Tours, Chilperic also engaged in forced conversion of Jews.

Chilperic's reign in Neustria saw the introduction of the Byzantine punishment of eye-gouging. Yet, he was also a man of culture: he was a musician of some talent, and he wrote verse (modelled on that of Sedulius); he attempted to reform the Frankish alphabet; and he worked to reduce the worst effects of Salic law upon women.

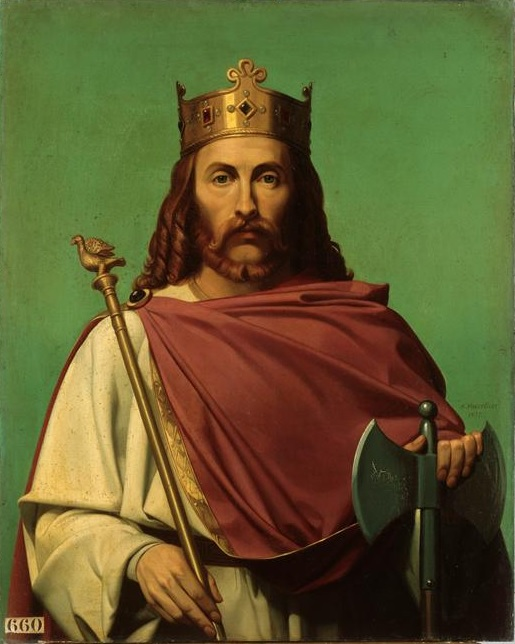
A modern portrait of Chilperic I

In September 584, while returning from a hunting expedition at his royal villa of Chelles, Chilperic was stabbed to death by an unknown assailant. He was buried in the Saint Vincent Basilica of Paris, later incorporated in the Saint-Germain-des-Prés.

== Family ==
Chilperic I's first marriage was to Audovera. They had five children:

- Theudebert (killed in battle, 575)
- Merovech (killed by a servant at his request in 577), married the widow Brunhilda (his aunt by marriage) and became his father's enemy
- Clovis (assassinated by Fredegund in 580)
- Basina (d. aft. 590) – a nun; led a revolt in the abbey of Poitiers
- Childesinda (died young from dysentery)

His short second marriage to Galswintha produced no children.

His concubinage and subsequent marriage to Fredegund in about 568 produced six more legitimate offspring:

- Rigunth (c. 569 – after 589), betrothed to Reccared but never married
- Chlodebert (c. 570/72 – 580), died young
- Samson (c. 573 – late 577), died young
- Dagobert (c. 579/80 – 580), died young
- Theuderic (c. 582 – 584), died young
- Chlothar II (before September 584 – 18 October 629), Chilperic's successor in Neustria, later sole king of the Franks

== Etymology ==
Chilperic's name in Frankish meant "powerful supporter", akin to German hilfreich "auxiliary" (cf. German Hilfe "help, aid" and reich "rich, orig. powerful")

== Cultural references ==
An operetta on the subject, Chilpéric, was created by Hervé, first performed in 1864.

== Sources ==
- Dahmus, Joseph Henry. Seven Medieval Queens. 1972.
- Halsall, Guy. "Nero and Herod? The death of Chilperic and Gregory of Tours' writing of history," in The World of Gregory of Tours, ed. Kathleen Mitchell and Ian Wood (Leiden: Brill, 2002).
- Kraemer, Ross Shepard (2020). The Mediterranean Diaspora in Late Antiquity: What Christianity Cost the Jews. Oxford University Press. ISBN 9780190222277.
- Wood, Ian (2014). The Merovingian Kingdoms 450 - 751. Routledge. ISBN 978-0-582-49372-8.

Chilperic I Merovingian dynasty Born: 539 Died: 584
Preceded by Clothar I	King of Soissons (Neustria); 561–584	Succeeded by Clothar II
