= Guntram =

King of Orléans from 561 to 592 AD

Gontrand *Gunþihrabn
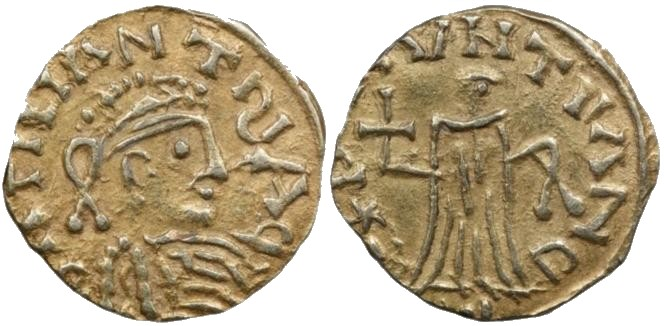
- A tremissis bearing Guntram's effigy and minted at Chalon-sur-Saône

King of Orléans
- Reign: 561–592
- Predecessor: Chlothar I
- Successor: Childebert II
- Rival king: Gundoald (584–585)
- Born: 532; Soissons
- Died: 28 March 592 (aged 59–60); Chalon-sur-Saône
- Spouses: Veneranda; Marcatrude; Austregilde
- Issue: Gundobad; Clothar; Chlodomer
- House: Merovingian
- Father: Chlothar I
- Mother: Ingund

Saint Gontrand
- Born: 532
- Died: March 28 592
- Venerated in: Catholic Church
- Feast: March 28

Saint Gontrand (c. 532 in Soissons – 28 March 592 in Chalon-sur-Saône), also called Gontran, Gontram, Guntram, Gunthram, Gunthchramn, and Guntramnus, was the king of the Kingdom of Orléans from AD 561 to AD 592. He was the third-eldest and second-eldest-surviving son of Chlothar I and Ingunda. On his father's death in 561, he became king of a fourth of the Kingdom of the Franks, and made his capital at Orléans. The name "Gontrand" denotes "War Raven".

== Personal life ==
King Gontrand had something of that fraternal love which his brothers lacked; the preeminent chronicler of the period, St. Gregory of Tours, often called him "good king Gontrand", as noted in the quotation below from the former's Decem Libri Historiarum, in which St. Gregory discussed the fate of Gontrand's three marriages:

The good king Gontrand first took a concubine Veneranda, a slave belonging to one of his people, by whom he had a son Gundobad. Later he married Marcatrude, daughter of Magnar, and sent his son Gundobad to Orléans. But after she had a son Marcatrude was jealous, and proceeded to bring about Gundobad's death. She sent poison, they say, and poisoned his drink. And upon his death, by God's judgment she lost the son she had and incurred the hate of the king, was dismissed by him, and died not long after. After her he took Austregilde, also named Bobilla. He had by her two sons, of whom the older was called Clothar and the younger Chlodomer.

Gontrand had a period of intemperance. He was eventually overcome with remorse for the sins of his past life, and spent his remaining years repenting of them, both for himself and for his nation. In atonement, he fasted, prayed, wept, and offered himself to God. Throughout the balance of his prosperous reign he attempted to govern by Christian principles. According to St. Gregory of Tours, he was the protector of the oppressed, caregiver to the sick, and the tender parent to his subjects. He was generous with his wealth, especially in times of plague and famine. He strictly and justly enforced the law without respect to person, yet was ever ready to forgive offences against himself, including two attempted assassinations. Gontrand munificently built and endowed many churches and monasteries. St. Gregory related that the king performed many miracles both before and after his death, some of which St. Gregory claimed to have witnessed himself.

== Politics ==
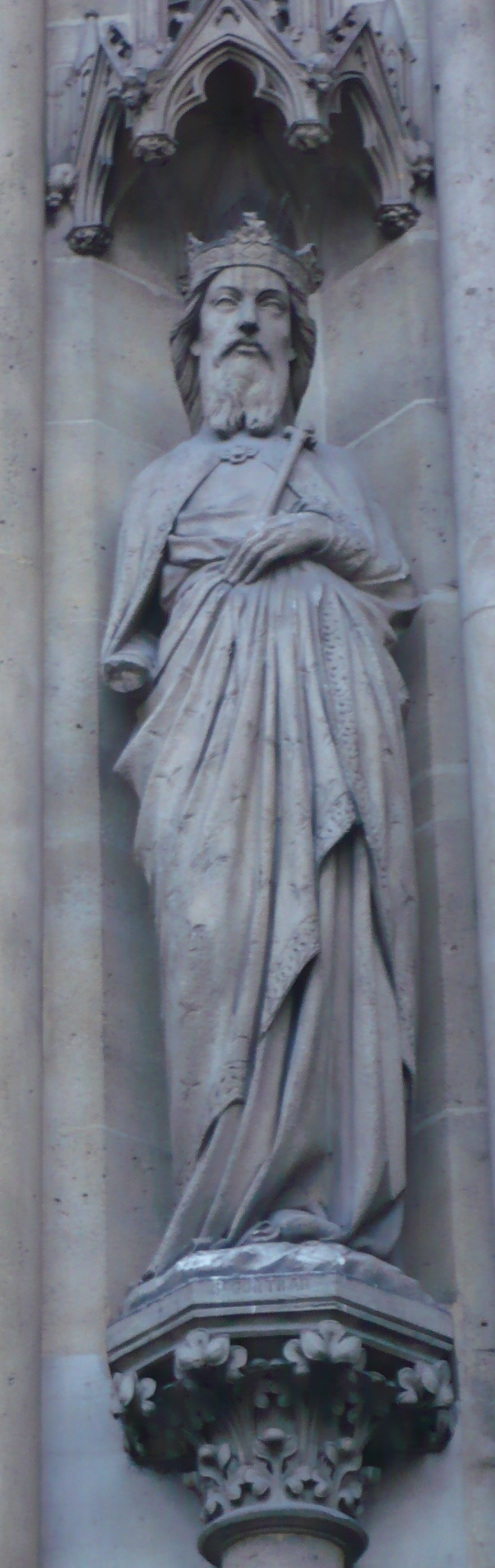
Later statue depicting Gontrand

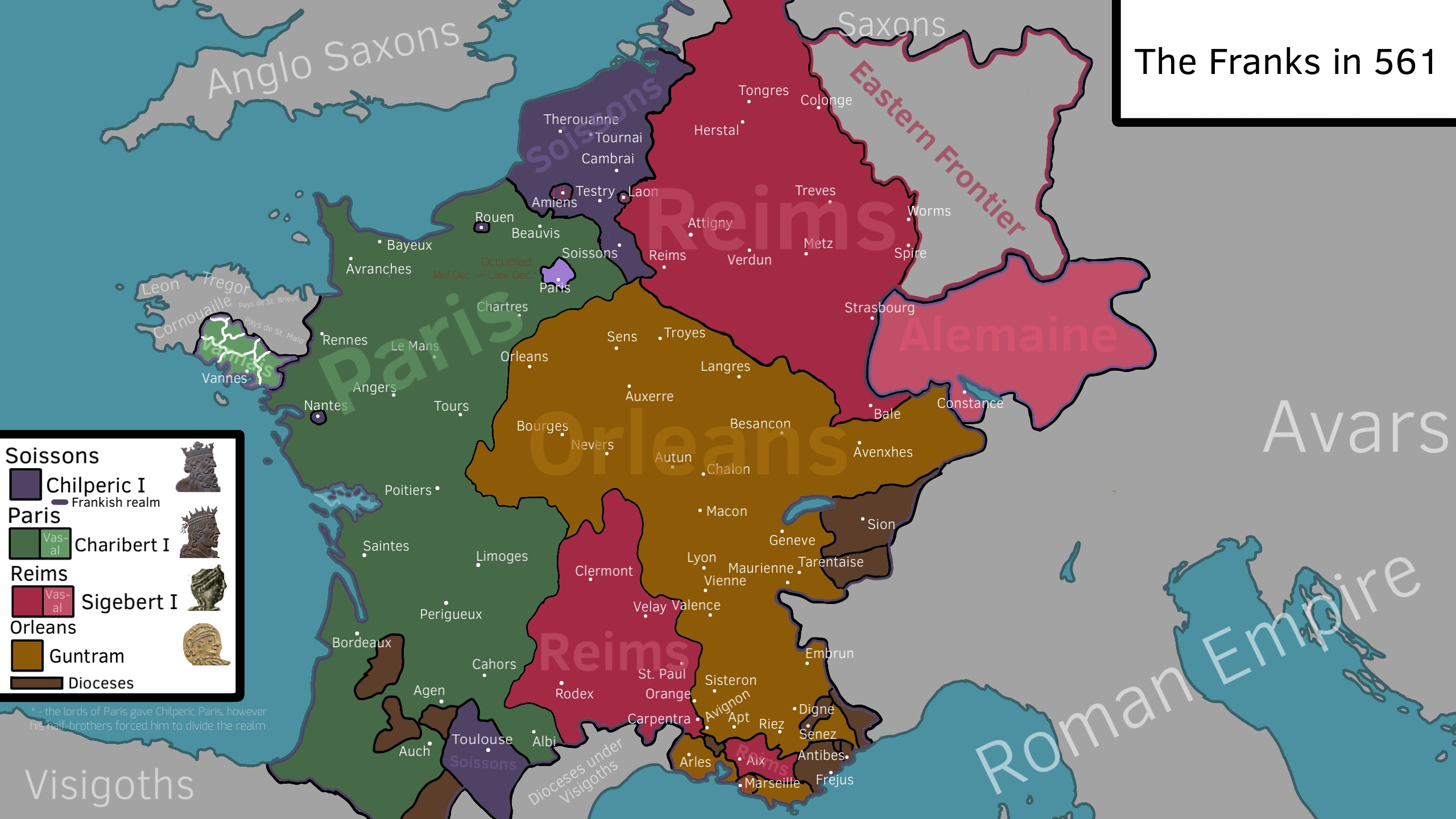
The Frankish Realm in 561, after the death of Clothar I

In 567, his elder brother Charibert I died and his lands of the Kingdom of Paris were divided between the surviving brothers: Gontrand, Sigebert I, and Chilperic I. They shared his realm, agreeing at first to hold Paris in common. Charibert's widow, Theudechild, proposed a marriage with Gontrand, the eldest remaining brother, though a council convened at Paris as late as 557 had forbidden such tradition as incestuous. Gontrand decided to house her more safely, though unwillingly, in a monastery in Arles.

In 573, Gontrand was caught in a civil war with his brother Sigebert I of Austrasia, and in 575 summoned the aid of their brother Chilperic I of Soissons. He reversed his allegiance later, due to the character of Chilperic, if we may give him the benefit of the doubt in light of St. Gregory's commendation, and Chilperic retreated. He thereafter remained an ally of Sigebert, his wife, and his sons until his death. When Sigebert was assassinated later in 575, Chilperic invaded the kingdom, but Gontrand sent his general Mummolus, who was always Gontrand's greatest weapon, for he was the greatest general in Gaul at the time, to remove him. Mummolus defeated Chilperic's general Desiderius and the Neustrian's forces retreated from Austrasia.

In 577, Chlothar and Clodomir, his two surviving children, died of dysentery and he adopted as his son and heir Childebert II, his nephew, Sigebert's son, whose kingdom he had saved two years prior. However, Childebert did not always prove faithful to his uncle. In 581, Chilperic took many of Gontrand's cities and in 583, he allied with Childebert and attacked Gontrand. This time Gontrand made peace with Chilperic and Childebert retreated. In 584, he returned Childebert's infidelity by invading his land and capturing Tours and Poitiers, but he had to leave to attend the baptism of Chlothar II, his other nephew, who now ruled in Neustria. Supposed to take place on 4 July, the feast of St. Martin of Tours, in Orléans, it did not and Gontrand turned to invade Septimania. Peace was soon made.

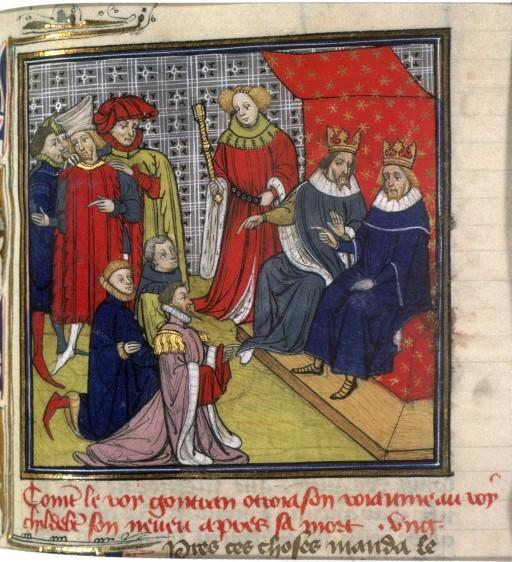
King St. Gontrand and Childebert II, from the Grandes Chroniques de France

In 584 or 585, one Gundowald claimed to be an illegitimate son of Chlothar I and proclaimed himself king, taking some major cities in southern Gaul, including Poitiers and Toulouse, which belonged to Gontrand. Gontrand marched against him, calling him nothing more than a miller's son named Ballomer. Gundowald fled to Comminges and Gontrand's army proceeded to besiege the citadel. He could not capture it, but did not need to. Gundowald's followers gave him over and he was executed.

In 587, Fredegund attempted to assassinate him but failed. On 28 November he went to Trier to conclude a treaty with Childebert; Brunhilda, his sister-in-law, Sigebert's wife, whose ally he had always been; Chlodosinda, Childebert's sister; Faileuba, Childebert's queen; Magneric, Bishop of Trier; and Ageric, Bishop of Verdun. This was called the Treaty of Andelot and it endured until Gontrand died.

Also in 587, Gontrand compelled obedience from Waroch II, the Breton ruler of the Vannetais. He forced the renewal of the oath of 578 in writing and demanded 1,000 solidi in compensation for raiding the Nantais. In 588, the compensation was not yet paid, as Waroch promised it to both Gontrand and Chlothar II, who probably had suzerainty over Vannes.

In 589 or 590, Gontrand sent an expedition against Waroch under Beppolem and Ebrachain, mutual enemies. Ebrachain was also enemy of Fredegund, who sent the Saxons of Bayeux to aid Waroch. Beppolem fought alone for three days before dying, at which point Waroch tried to flee to the Channel Islands, but Ebrachain destroyed his ships and forced him to accept a peace, the renewal of the oath, and the surrender of a nephew as a hostage. This was all to no effect. The Bretons maintained their independent mindedness.

In 589, Gontrand made a final advance on Septimania, to no avail. He fought against the barbarians who menaced the kingdom and quelled a rebellion of his niece Basina at the Holy Cross abbey of Poitiers with the aid of many of his bishops in 590.

== Death and veneration ==
He died at Chalon-sur-Saône in 592, and his nephew Childebert II succeeded him. He was buried in the Church of Saint Marcellus, which he had founded in Chalon. Almost immediately, his subjects proclaimed Gontrand a saint and the Catholic Church celebrates his feast day on 28 March. The Huguenots, who scattered his ashes in the 16th century, left only his skull untouched in their fury. It is now kept there in a silver case.

Guntram Merovingian dynasty Born: 545 Died: 592
Preceded by Chlothar I	King of Orléans; 561–592	Succeeded by Childebert II
