= Fredegund =

- Queen consort of Neustria (Soissons)
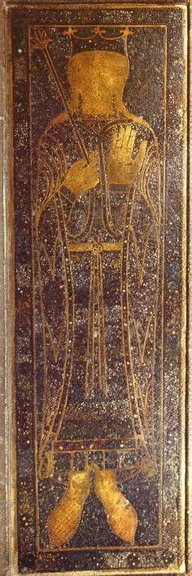
- Fredegund as depicted in her funerary effigy at the Basilica of Saint-Denis
- Born: 543
- Died: 8 December 597 (aged 54); Paris, France
- Burial: Saint Denis Basilica, Paris
- Spouse: Chilperic I
- Issue: Chlodobert; Rigunth; Samson; Dagobert; Theuderic; Chlothar II

Fredegund or Fredegunda (Latin: Fredegundis; French: Frédégonde; c. 543 – 8 December 597) was the queen consort of Chilperic I, the Merovingian Frankish king of Neustria. Fredegund served as regent during the minority of her son Chlothar II from 584 until 597.

Fredegund has traditionally been given a rather poor reputation, foremost by the accounts of Gregory of Tours, who depicts her as ruthlessly murderous and sadistically cruel, and she is known for the many stories of her cruelty, particularly for her long feud with her sister-in-law queen Brunhilda of Austrasia.

== Queen ==
Fredegund was born into a low-ranking family but gained power through her association with King Chilperic. Originally a servant of Chilperic's first wife Audovera, Fredegund won Chilperic's affection and persuaded him to put Audovera in a convent and divorce her.

Chilperic put Fredegund aside and married Galswintha, the daughter of Visigothic King Athanagild, after his half-brother and rival, King Sigibert I of Austrasia, had married Galswintha's younger sister Brunhilda in 566. Gregory of Tours remarks that the marriage to Galswintha began happily, because she brought with her a handsome dowry. The marriage soon deteriorated, and Galswintha died the same year, probably strangled on the orders of Chilperic or Fredegund (c. 568), who succeeded Galswintha as queen. Galswintha's sister, Brunhilda, however, began a feud which lasted more than 40 years.

Gregory of Tours suggests that the Queen had committed adultery. During a dinner with King Guntram, the recently widowed Fredegund rose to leave the table with the excuse that she was pregnant. The announcement surprised the King, as her son Clothar II was born only four months earlier. Gregory of Tours interprets this exchange as a result of Fredegund's unfaithfulness to her husband.

In 580 AD, an epidemic of dysentery broke out in Gaul, afflicting Fredegund's husband King Chilperic and their two sons, Chlodobert and Dagobert. Believing the plague to be a result of her sins, Fredegund burned a number of tax records she feared were unjust and encouraged Chilperic to do the same. Her sons, however, did not survive the epidemic. Following their funerals, Fredegund made a large donation to churches and the poor to continue to atone for her sins. Another of Fredegund's sons, Samson, was stricken with a serious illness while the family was under siege in Tournai. According to Gregory, Fredegund feared that she would catch the disease from Samson and cast him away from her, allowing him to die. The King was offended by her actions as the child had not yet been baptized. When Samson survived longer than expected, Fredegund relented and had him baptized according to the King's wishes.

=== Conflict with Rigunth ===
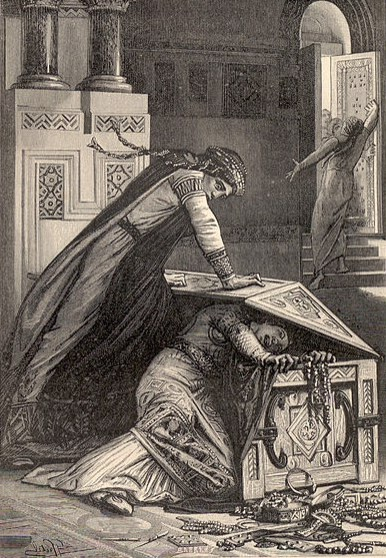
Fredegund and Rigunth, steel engraving from Mme de Witt, Vieilles histoires de la patrie, 1887

Gregory of Tours records the bad relationship between Fredegund and her daughter Rigunth:

She was jealous of her own daughter, Rigunth, who continually declared that she should be mistress in her place. Fredegund waited her opportunity and under the pretense of magnanimity took her to the treasure-room and showed her the King's jewels in a large chest. Feigning fatigue, she exclaimed "I am weary; put thou in thy hand, and take out what thou mayest find." The mother thereupon forced down the lid on her neck and would have killed her had not the servants finally rushed to her aid.

When Rigunth was sent off to her Visigothic fiancé in Spain Reccared, son of Liuvigild, her entourage was so laden with rich gifts that the Frankish nobles objected that the royal fisc had been depleted. Fredegund asserted that all the gifts had come out of property amassed by her husband's generosity. On the long journey, Rigunth's retainers repeatedly robbed and abandoned her, and by the time she reached Toulouse there was little left. When Chilperic died in 584 AD, Desiderius of Aquitaine went to Toulouse to secure the remaining treasure.

The Neustrian ex-domesticus Leunardus travelled to the Cathedral of Paris, where the Queen was staying, to relay the news of Rigunth's capture. By Gregory's account, Fredegund was so enraged at Leunardus's message that she ordered his public humiliation in the center of the church. She had him beaten, chained, and jailed along with the cooks and bakers who accompanied him on the journey. She stopped short of killing him, however, due to his political status in the region.

== Regency ==
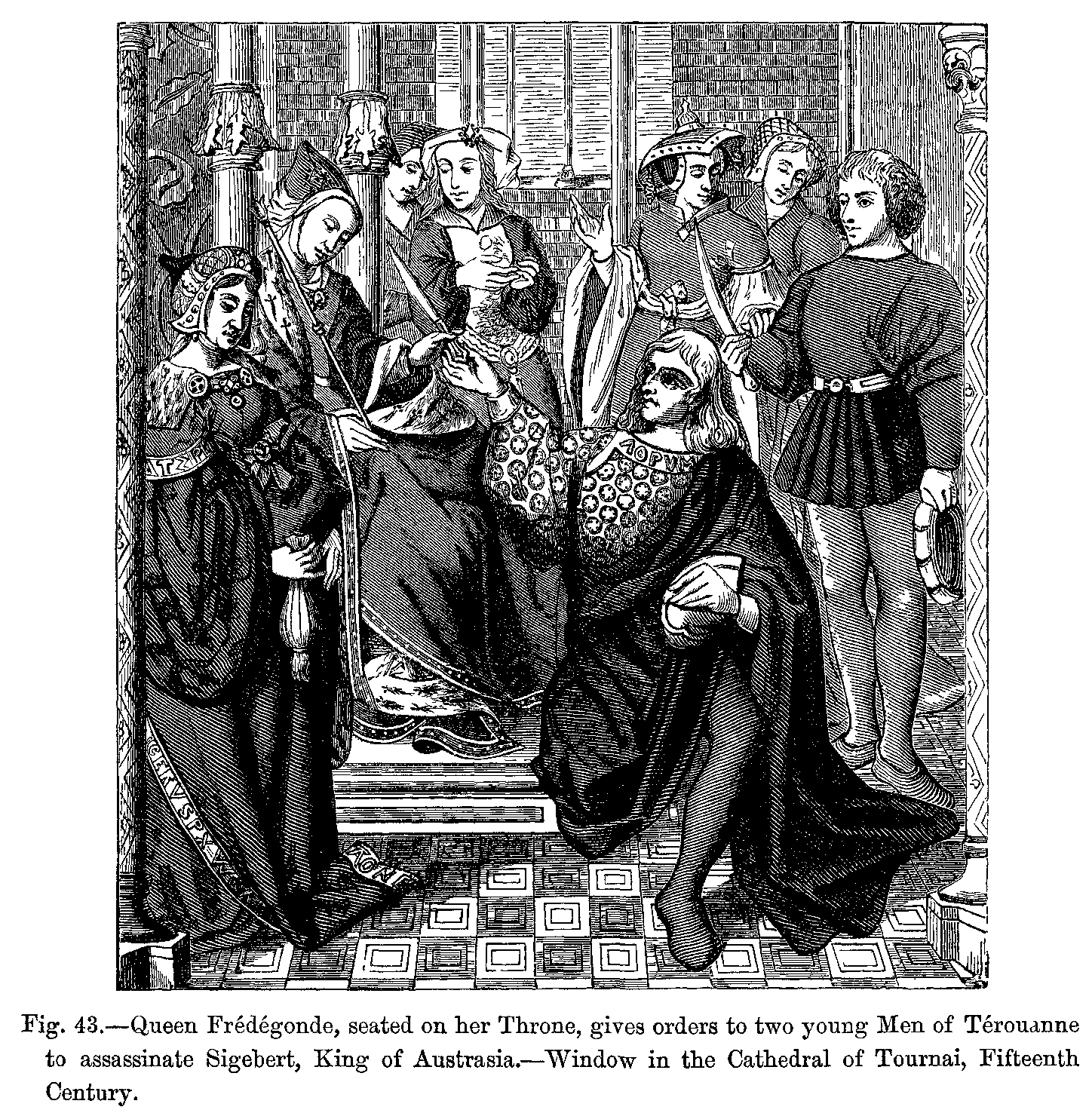
Fredegund, seated on her throne, gives orders to assassinate Sigebert, King of Austrasia, steel engraving after a 15th-century window in the Cathedral of Tournai.

Upon the death of Chilperic I in 584, Fredegund became regent during the minority of her infant son Chlothar II. She took sanctuary in the cathedral of Paris. After obtaining the protection of King Guntram, she ensured that her son Chlothar's claim to the throne of Neustria was recognized by his subjects. She would then reside north of Rouen. During the latter half of her life, the political situation between Neustria and Austrasia and Burgundy broke down into full on conflict. In these wars, she took on the role of commander and led the Neustrian armies to victory on multiple occasions.

=== Religion ===
During Fredegund's regency, she maintained the support of the clergy. According to Gregory Halfond, it was found that a core group of a dozen bishoprics in Northern Gaul remained loyal to Fredegund and Chlothar. Halfond also notes that Fredegund was shown to have granted financial patronage to the Bishop of Le Mans, “...In his testament of 616, Bishop Bertram of Le Mans acknowledges that he originally received the villa of Bonnelles in Étampes as a gift from Fredegund and her young son Chlothar II, for whom she served as regent, sometime between 596 and 597.” Fredegund's donation to Bishop Bertram was not the only isolated case of generosity as the Neustrian monarchy also maintained friendly relations and patronized St. Radegund’s monastery of the Holy Cross in Poitiers.

=== Major attempts ===
Fredegund is said to have ordered the assassination of Sigebert I of Austrasia in 575 and also to have made attempts on the lives of Sigebert's son Childebert II, her brother-in-law Guntram, king of Burgundy, and Brunhild. After the mysterious assassination of Chilperic in 584 AD, Fredegund seized the Kings riches and took refuge in the Cathedral of Saint Étienne, the predecessor of Notre Dame de Paris cathedral. Both she and her surviving son, Clothar II, were protected by Guntram until he died in 592. Newly widowed, Fredegund attempted to seduce the Neustrian official Eberulf but was ultimately rejected. Gregory of Tours later suspects her of orchestrating Eberulf's subsequent assassination. In 593, she led troops to an upset rout of Brunhilda's troops at the Battle of Droizy.

=== Persecution of Praetextatus ===
Additionally, Gregory of Tours suggests that the persecution of the Bishop Praetextatus was largely driven by Fredegund. Following Praetextatus's return from exile, the Queen met him in church and threatened to have him exiled a second time. However, the Bishop was not concerned because he believed he would receive his reward in heaven, whereas Fredegund would be punished in hell. In 586, Fredegund ordered the assassination of Praetextatus and had one of her agents stab him during Easter Mass. The Queen later visited Praetextatus on his deathbed and offered the assistance of her physicians, which Gregory of Tours interprets as an excuse to witness the bishop's death. Praetextatus urged her to repent of her sins before finally succumbing to his wounds. Fredegund later conducted assassination plots against a number of political officials who condemned the assassination, including the Bishop of Bayeux and King Guntram.

== Death ==
Fredegund died of natural causes on 8 December 597 in Paris. The tomb of Frédégonde is a mosaic figure of marble and copper, situated in the Saint Denis Basilica, having come from the abbey church of Saint-Germain-des-Prés.

Fredegund did not live to see it, but her son's execution of Brunhilda bore the mark of her conflict with Fredegund. Clothar II, then the king, ordered that she be tied by the arms and hair to the tail of a young, untamed horse, and dragged through the entire army. As soon as the king gave this order, it was carried out. The first time the man who was on the horse dug his spurs in, the horse kicked up his heels with such force that Brunhilda's head flew off. Her body was dragged through the bushes and brambles, over hills and dales, so that it was torn to pieces, limb from limb.

== Issue ==
With Chilperic I, she had five sons and one daughter, Rigunth (* around 570; † after 585). The four oldest sons were Chlodobert (* 565, † 580), Samson (* 575, † 577), Dagobert († 580) and Theuderic (* 582, † 584), who all died at a young age.

== Legacy ==
=== Reputation ===
Fredegund traditionally has had a negative reputation. According to Gregory of Tours, it is understood that as queen, Fredegund involved herself in court intrigue and was responsible for numerous assassination plots on political figures and clergy alike, such as the Bishop of Rouen, Praetextatus, and King Guntram of Burgundy. However, Gregory of Tours' account must be taken with suspicion as it is heavily biased against Fredegund. Halfond mentions the existence of inconsistencies regarding the relationships within the Neustrian court. For example, Bishop Leudovald whom Fredegund is mentioned to have targeted for assassination after the plot against Praetextatus succeeded for fear that Leudovald would find out and expose her. The plot ultimately failed and supposedly their relationship became racked with tension, however, regardless of fact that an attempt on his life was made he still saw fit to offer Fredegund a favor in 587 which entailed freeing one of her legates who was imprisoned on charges of carrying out an assassination in her name. Furthermore, even during the reign of Fredegund’s son, King Chlothar II, Leudovald continued to receive favor from the Neustrian monarchy and was invited to attend the Council of Paris in 614. Such oddities within Gregory’s accounts may suggest that his account of Fredegund’s villainy is exaggerated and this exaggeration likely has to do with his ties outside of Neustria.

Gregory himself was a Gallo-Roman whose family was a part of the senatorial classes, his position within society allowed him to become Bishop of the diocese of Tours. The connections he also gained from his senatorial heritage also intertwined him with the likes of King Sigebert, his wife Brunhild, and the Austrasian court which served as a rival kingdom to Neustria. In fact, it was King Sigebert I and Brunhilda that were responsible for his appointment to the bishopric of Tours. According to the historian, E.T. Dailey, these various influences likely served as the reason why he juxtaposed Fredegund and Brunhild in the way he did. Familiarity and patronage would result in a close relationship between Gregory and Brunhild, to maintain such a relationship he likely felt he was unable to comment thoroughly on her faults.

As a result, Gregory of Tours portrays them as political enemies and moral opposites to the point where Brunhild receives almost no criticism within his record while Fredegund is accused of performing witchcraft, sacrilege, and even treason along with her various assassination plots. He likely hoped that having such a stark comparison would serve as an endorsement of Brunhild and justify his political relationship with her. This lack of criticism becomes suspect when we consider later accounts written by other scholars such as Fredegar who wrote differing interpretations on the reputation of Brunhild. After Gregory’s death, Brunhild fell from power and was accused of various regicides which resulted in her being subject to a punitive death. These accusations, whether real or fabricated due to court intrigue, show that Brunhild, a contemporary counterpart to Fredegund and equal status to her in queenship, also had internal enemies to contend with. The only exception is that because of her relationship with Gregory, Brunhild had a patron that could uphold her reputation.

=== Music ===
French composers of the late Romantic period dramatized her story in music. Ernest Guiraud began composing the opera Frédégonde with a libretto by Louis Gallet but did not finish before his death in 1892; it was then completed by Camille Saint-Saëns and Paul Dukas and premiered in 1895.

Max d'Ollone received the Prix de Rome in 1897 for his cantata Frédégonde.

Fredegundis, an opera in three acts by Franz Schmidt, text after Felix Dahn by Bruno Hardt-Warden and Ignaz Michael Welleminsky, was composed 1916–21, and premiered in Berlin in 1922.

== See also ==
- List of Frankish queens
- Merovingian dynasty

== Bibliography ==
- Gregory of Tours. A History of the Franks. Translated by Lewis Thorpe. London: Penguin Books, 1974.
- Dailey, E.T. Queens, Consorts, Concubines: Gregory of Tours and Women of the Merovingian Elite. Boston: Brill Academic Publishers, 2015.
- Ferros, Bonnie and Isabel Moreira, eds. The Oxford Handbook of the Merovingian World. Oxford: Oxford University Press, 2020.
- Halfond, Gregory I. (2012). "Sis Quoque Catholicis Religionis Apex: The Ecclesiastical Patronage of Chilperic I and Fredegund". Church History. 81 (1): 48–76. doi:10.1017/S0009640711001776. JSTOR 41410806. S2CID 154393901.
- Halsall, Guy (2007). "The Preface to Book V of Gregory of Tours' Histories: Its Form, Context and Significance". The English Historical Review. 122 (496): 297–317. doi:10.1093/ehr/cem001. JSTOR 4493805.
- Puhak, Shelley. The Dark Queens. Bloomsbury. ISBN 9781635574913. 2022.
- Wemple, Suzanne Fonay. Women in Frankish Society, Marriage and the Cloister, 500 to 900. Philadelphia: University of Pennsylvania Press, 1981.
- Wood, Ian N. (1993). "The secret histories of Gregory of Tours". Revue belge de Philologie et d'Histoire. 71 (2): 253–270. doi:10.3406/rbph.1993.3879.
