= Pontianus =

Pontianus may refer to:

- Pontianus of Spoleto (c. 156–175), Christian martyr and patron saint of that city
- Pontianus Africae, 6th-century Bishop of Constantinople
- Sicinius Pontianus, friend of Apuleius
- Pontianus of Nicomedia, a character in Deipnosophistae, a 3rd-century work by Athaenaeus

== See also ==
- Ponciano (disambiguation)
- Pons (disambiguation)
- Pontian (disambiguation)
- Pontic (disambiguation)
- Pontine (disambiguation)
