= Pons (disambiguation) =

The pons (or pons Varolii; "bridge of Varolius") is a part of the brain stem.

Pons or pons may also refer to:

== People ==
- Pons (personal name), notable people with Pons as their surname, given name, or singular name

== Toponyms ==
- Pons, Charente-Maritime, a commune in France
- Pons River, a tributary of the Caniapiscau River (watershed of Ungava bay), in Nunavik, Nord-du-Québec, Quebec, Canada
- Pons (crater), a lunar impact crater west of the prominent Rupes Altai scarp

== Other uses ==
- Pons, a junior synonym of the butterfly genus Penaincisalia
- Passive optical network, a telecommunications term
- Polish Lowland Sheepdog, from the Polish Polski Owczarek Nizinny, a type of sheepdog

== See also ==
- PON (disambiguation)
- Ponce (disambiguation)
- Ponciano (disambiguation)
- Pontian (disambiguation)
- Ponza (disambiguation)
