= Pontian =

Pontian may refer to:

- Pope Pontian (died 235), 3rd-century Catholic Pope
- Pontian Greeks, a group of ethnic Greeks traditionally from the Pontus and Pontic Mountains regions in northern Turkey
- Pontian Islands, a group of islands on the coast of Italy
- Pontian District, a district and city in Johor, Malaysia
  - Pontian (federal constituency)
  - Pontian Kechil or Pontian Town
- Pontian stage (Pontian age), the uppermost Miocene Paratethys stage, coeval with the Messinian

== See also ==
- Ponciano (disambiguation)
- Pons (disambiguation)
- Pontian Selatan (federal constituency) (1959–1974), Johor, Malaysia
- Pontian Utara (federal constituency) (1959–1974), Johor, Malaysia
- Pontianus (disambiguation)
- Pontic (disambiguation)
- Pontine (disambiguation)
