= SS Pontiac =

SS Pontiac is the name of the following ships:

- SS Pontiac (1879), sunk by SM U-53 on 21 April 1917
- SS Pontiac (1889), later Goudreau, wrecked 23 November 1917 five miles southeast of Lyal Island on Lake Huron
- SS Pontiac (1917), freighter, scrapped 1984

== See also ==
- Pontiac (disambiguation)
