= Visigoths =

Germanic people of late antiquity and the early Middle Ages

Visigothi
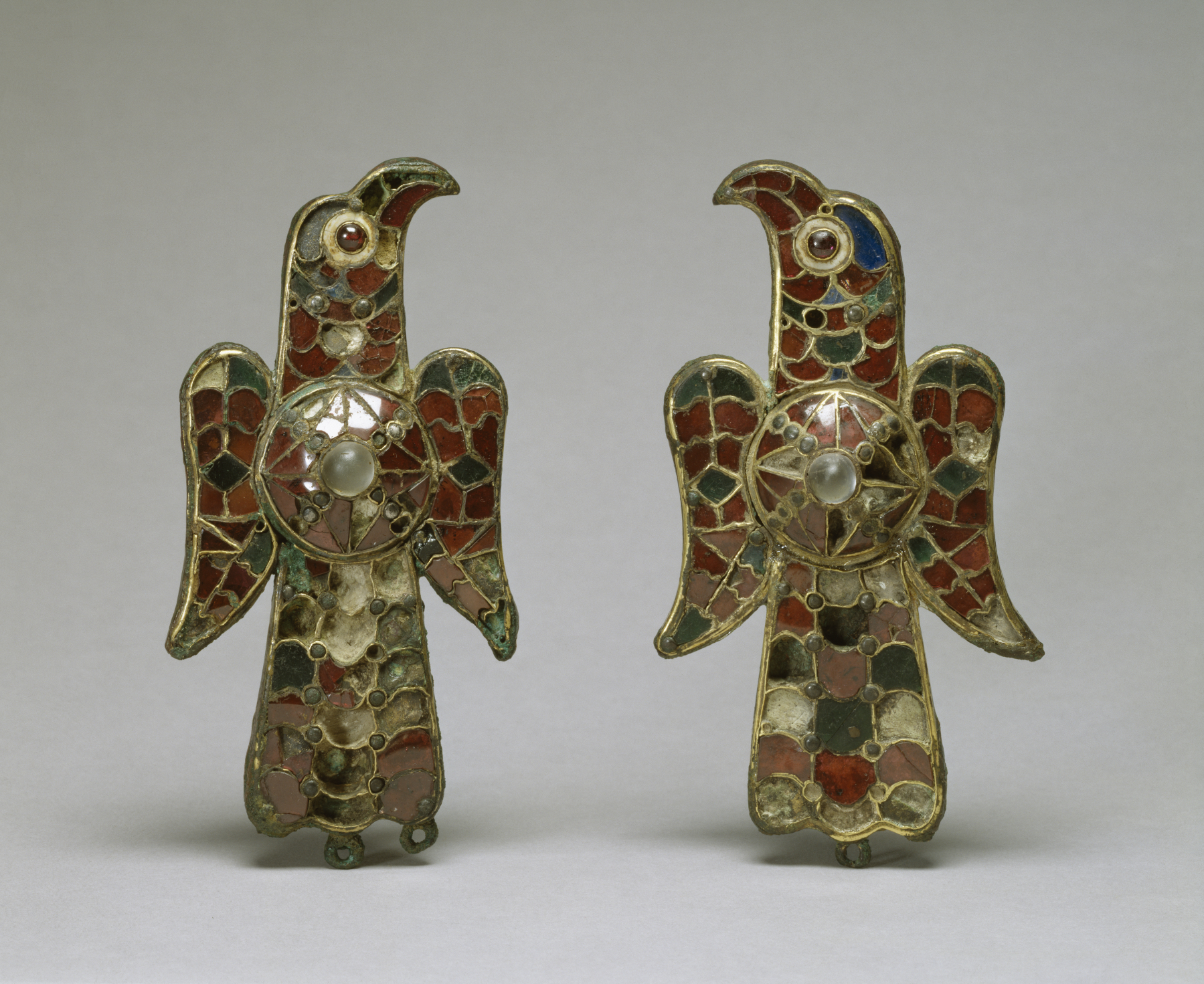
- The eagles represented on these fibulae from the 6th century, and found in Tierra de Barros (Badajoz), were a popular symbol among the Goths in Spain. (Note: Pair of Eagle Fibula Walters Art Museum)

Languages
- Gothic

Religion
- Gothic paganism, Arianism, Nicene Christianity, Roman paganism

Related ethnic groups
- Ostrogoths, Crimean Goths, Vandals, Gepids

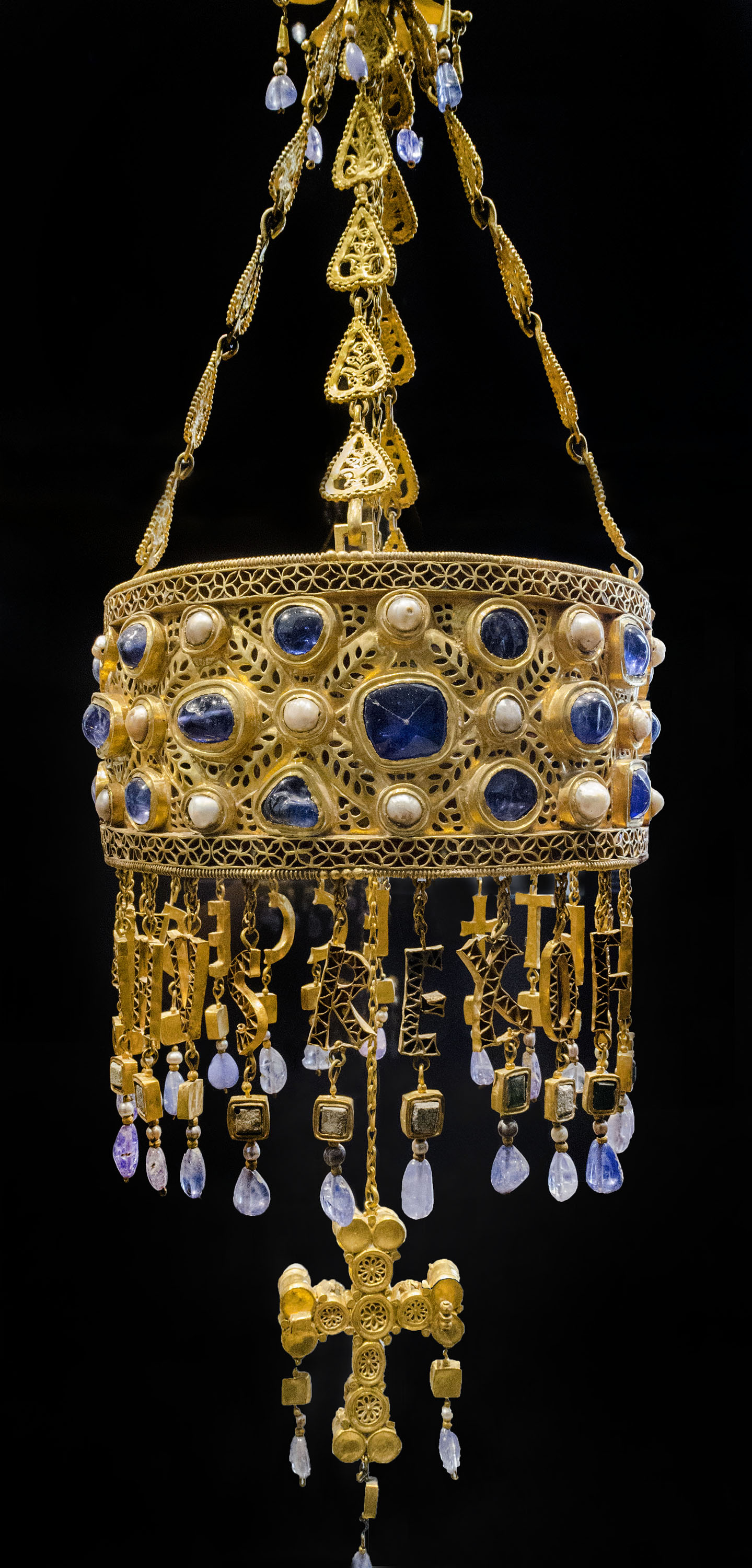
Detail of the votive crown of Recceswinth from the Treasure of Guarrazar (Toledo, Spain), hanging in Madrid. The hanging letters spell [R]ECCESVINTHVS REX OFFERET [“King Receswinth offered it"]. (Note: The first R is held at the Musée de Cluny, Paris.)

The Visigoths (/ˈvɪzɪɡɒθs/; Latin: Visigothi, Wisigothi, Vesi, Visi, Wesi, Wisi) were a Gothic people who emerged in the Balkans during late antiquity. Probably descended from the Thervingi who entered the Roman Empire in 376 and defeated the Romans at the Battle of Adrianople (378), they were first united under Alaric I (395–410), whose forces alternately fought and allied with Rome before famously sacking the city in 410.

In 418, the Visigoths were settled as foederati in southern Gaul, establishing a kingdom with its capital at Toulouse. From there they expanded into Hispania, displacing the Suebi and Vandals. Defeat by the Franks under Clovis I at the Battle of Vouillé (507) ended Visigothic rule in Gaul, but the kingdom consolidated in Spain and Portugal, where it endured for two centuries.

The Visigoths are renowned for their cultural and religious transformation of Iberia. Under King Reccared I, they converted from Arian Christianity to Nicene Christianity at the Third Council of Toledo (589), integrating with their Hispano-Roman subjects and strengthening royal legitimacy. Their Visigothic Code (654) abolished legal distinctions between Goths and Romans, creating a common identity as Hispani. The kingdom fostered churches and artistic treasures such as the Treasure of Guarrazar, and its legal code remained influential in Iberian law until the Late Middle Ages.

In 711, the Visigothic kingdom collapsed after defeat by an Umayyad army at the Battle of Guadalete, where King Roderic was killed. In the north, the Kingdom of Asturias soon emerged under Pelagius, marking the beginning of the Reconquista. Despite their fall, the Visigoths left a lasting legacy through their legal system, cultural influence, and role in the formation of medieval Iberia.

== Nomenclature: Vesi, Tervingi, Visigoths ==
The Visigoths were never called Visigoths, only Goths, until Cassiodorus used the term, when referring to their loss against Clovis I in the Franco–Gothic War about 507. Cassiodorus apparently invented the term based on the model of the "Ostrogoths", but using the older name of the Vesi, one of the tribal names that the fifth-century poet Sidonius Apollinaris had already used when referring to the Visigoths. The first part of the Ostrogoth name is related to the word "east", and Jordanes, the medieval writer, later clearly contrasted them in his Getica, stating that "Visigoths were the Goths of the western country." According to Wolfram, Cassiodorus created this east–west understanding of the Goths, which was a simplification and literary device, while political realities were more complex. Cassiodorus used the term "Goths" to refer to only the Ostrogoths, whom he served, and reserved the geographic reference "Visigoths" for the Gallo-Spanish Goths. The term "Visigoths" was later used by the Visigoths themselves in their communications with the Byzantine Empire, and was still in use in the 7th century.

Europe in 305 AD

Two older tribal names from outside the Roman empire are associated with Visigoths who formed within the empire. The first references to any Gothic tribes by Roman and Greek authors were in the third century, notably including the Thervingi, who were once referred to as Goths by Ammianus Marcellinus. Much less is known of the "Vesi" or "Visi", from whom the term "Visigoth" was derived. Before Sidonius Apollinaris, the Vesi were first mentioned in the Notitia Dignitatum, a late-4th- or early-5th-century list of Roman military forces. This list also contains the last mention of the "Thervingi" in a classical source.

Although he did not refer to the Vesi, Tervingi or Greuthungi, Jordanes identified the Visigothic kings from Alaric I to Alaric II as the successors of the fourth-century Tervingian king Athanaric, and the Ostrogoth kings from Theoderic the Great to Theodahad as the heirs of the Greuthungi king Ermanaric. Based on this, many scholars have traditionally treated the terms "Vesi" and "Tervingi" as referring to one distinct tribe, while the terms "Ostrogothi" and "Greuthungi" were used to refer to another.

Wolfram, who still recently defends the equation of Vesi with the Tervingi, argues that while primary sources occasionally list all four names (as in, for example, Gruthungi, Austrogothi, Tervingi, Visi), whenever they mention two different tribes, they always refer either to "the Vesi and the Ostrogothi" or to "the Tervingi and the Greuthungi", and they never pair them up in any other combination. In addition, Wolfram interprets the Notitia Dignitatum as equating the Vesi with the Tervingi in a reference to the years 388–391. On the other hand, another recent interpretation of the Notitia is that the two names, Vesi and Tervingi, are found in different places in the list, "a clear indication that we are dealing with two different army units, which must also presumably mean that they are, after all, perceived as two different peoples". Peter Heather has written that Wolfram's position is "entirely arguable, but so is the opposite".

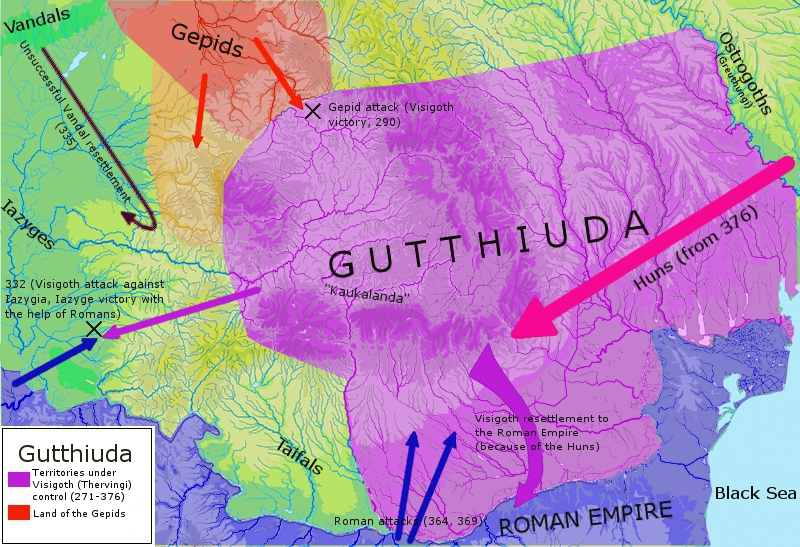
Gutthiuda

Wolfram believes that "Vesi" and "Ostrogothi" were terms each tribe used to boastfully describe itself and argues that "Tervingi" and "Greuthungi" were geographical identifiers each tribe used to describe the other. This would explain why the latter terms dropped out of use shortly after 400, when the Goths were displaced by the Hunnic invasions. Wolfram believes that the people Zosimus describes were those Tervingi who had remained behind after the Hunnic conquest. For the most part, all of the terms discriminating between different Gothic tribes gradually disappeared after they moved into the Roman Empire.

Many recent scholars, such as Peter Heather, have concluded that Visigothic group identity emerged only within the Roman Empire. Roger Collins also believes that the Visigothic identity emerged from the Gothic War of 376–382 when a collection of Tervingi, Greuthungi and other "barbarian" contingents banded together in multiethnic foederati (Wolfram's "federate armies") under Alaric I in the eastern Balkans, since they had become a multi ethnic group and could no longer claim to be exclusively Tervingian.

Other names for other Gothic divisions abounded. In 469, the Visigoths were called the "Alaric Goths". The Frankish Table of Nations, probably of Byzantine or Italian origin, referred to one of the two peoples as the Walagothi, meaning "Roman Goths" (from Germanic *walhaz, foreign). This probably refers to the Romanized Visigoths after their entry into Spain. Landolfus Sagax, writing in the 10th or 11th century, calls the Visigoths the Hypogothi.

=== Etymology of Tervingi and Vesi/Visigothi ===
The name Tervingi may mean "forest people", with the first part of the name related to Gothic triu, and English "tree". This is supported by evidence that geographic descriptors were commonly used to distinguish people living north of the Black Sea both before and after Gothic settlement there, by evidence of forest-related names among the Tervingi, and by the lack of evidence for an earlier date for the name pair Tervingi–Greuthungi than the late third century. That the name Tervingi has pre-Pontic, possibly Scandinavian, origins still has support today.

The Visigoths are called Wesi or Wisi by Trebellius Pollio, Claudian and Sidonius Apollinaris. The word is Gothic for "good", implying the "good or worthy people", related to Gothic iusiza "better" and a reflex of Indo-European *wesu "good", akin to Welsh gwiw "excellent", Greek eus "good", Sanskrit vásu-ş "id.". Jordanes relates the tribe's name to a river, though this is probably a folk etymology or legend like his similar story about the Greuthung name.

== History ==
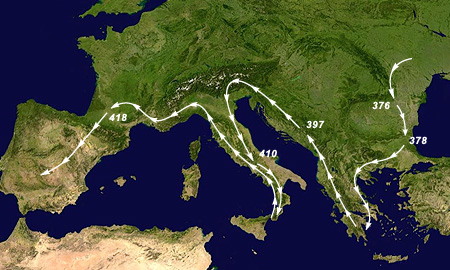
Migrations of the main column of the Visigoths

=== Early origins ===
The Visigoths emerged from the Gothic tribes, probably a derivative name for the Gutones, a people believed to have their origins in Scandinavia and who migrated southeastwards into eastern Europe. This understanding of their origins is largely the result of Gothic traditions, and their true genesis as a people is as obscure as that of the Franks and Alamanni. The Visigoths spoke an eastern Germanic language that was distinct by the 4th century. Eventually the Gothic language died as a result of contact with other European people during the Middle Ages.

Long struggles between the neighboring Vandili and Lugii people with the Goths may have contributed to their earlier exodus into mainland Europe. The vast majority of them settled between the Oder and Vistula rivers until overpopulation (according to Gothic legends or tribal sagas) forced them to move south and east, where they settled just north of the Black Sea. However, this legend is not supported by archaeological evidence so its validity is disputable. Historian Malcolm Todd contends that while this large en masse migration is possible, the movement of Gothic peoples south-east was probably the result of warrior bands moving closer to the wealth of Ukraine and the cities of the Black Sea coast. Perhaps what is most notable about the Gothic people in this regard was that by the middle of the third century AD, they were "the most formidable military power beyond the lower Danube frontier".

==== Contact with Rome ====
Throughout the 3rd and 4th centuries there were numerous conflicts and exchanges of varying types between the Goths and their neighbors. After the Romans withdrew from the territory of Dacia, the local population was subjected to constant invasions by the migratory tribes, among the first being the Goths. In 238, the Goths invaded across the Danube into the Roman province of Moesia, pillaging and exacting payment through hostage taking. During the war with the Persians that year, Goths also appeared in the Roman armies of Gordian III. When subsidies to the Goths were stopped, the Goths organized and in 250 joined a major barbarian invasion led by the Germanic king, Kniva. Success on the battlefield against the Romans inspired additional invasions into the northern Balkans and deeper into Anatolia. Starting in approximately 255, the Goths added a new dimension to their attacks by taking to the sea and invading harbors which brought them into conflict with the Greeks as well. When the city of Pityus fell to the Goths in 256, the Goths were further emboldened. Between 266 and 267, the Goths raided Greece, but when they attempted to move into the Bosporus straits to attack Byzantium, they were repulsed. Along with other Germanic tribes, they attacked further into Anatolia, assaulting Crete and Cyprus on the way; shortly thereafter, they pillaged Troy and the temple of Artemis at Ephesus. Throughout the reign of emperor Constantine the Great, the Visigoths continued to conduct raids on Roman territory south of the Danube River. By 332, relations between the Goths and Romans were stabilized by a treaty but this was not to last.

=== War with Rome (376–382) ===
The Goths remained in Dacia until 376, when one of their leaders, Fritigern, appealed to the Eastern Roman Emperor Valens to be allowed to settle with his people on the south bank of the Danube. Here, they hoped to find refuge from the Huns. Valens permitted this, as he saw in them "a splendid recruiting ground for his army". However, a famine broke out and Rome was unwilling to supply them with either the food they were promised or the land. Generally, the Goths were abused by the Romans, who began forcing the now starving Goths to trade away their children so as to stave off starvation. Open revolt ensued, leading to 6 years of plundering throughout the Balkans, the death of a Roman Emperor and a disastrous defeat of the Roman army.

The Battle of Adrianople in 378 was the decisive moment of the war. The Roman forces were slaughtered and the Emperor Valens was killed during the fighting. Precisely how Valens fell remains uncertain but Gothic legend tells of how the emperor was taken to a farmhouse, which was set on fire above his head, a tale made more popular by its symbolic representation of a heretical emperor receiving hell's torment. Many of Rome's leading officers and some of their most elite fighting men died during the battle which struck a major blow to Roman prestige and the Empire's military capabilities. Adrianople shocked the Roman world and eventually forced the Romans to negotiate with and settle the tribe within the empire's boundaries, a development with far-reaching consequences for the eventual fall of Rome. Fourth-century Roman soldier and historian Ammianus Marcellinus ended his chronology of Roman history with this battle.

Despite the severe consequences for Rome, Adrianople was not nearly as productive overall for the Visigoths and their gains were short-lived. Still confined to a small and relatively impoverished province of the Empire, another Roman army was being gathered against them, an army which also had amid its ranks other disaffected Goths. Intense campaigns against the Visigoths followed their victory at Adrianople for upwards of three years. Approach routes across the Danube provinces were effectively sealed off by concerted Roman efforts, and while there was no decisive victory to claim, it was essentially a Roman triumph ending in a treaty in 382. The treaty struck with the Goths was to be the first foedus on imperial Roman soil. It required these semi-autonomous Germanic tribes to raise troops for the Roman army in exchange for arable land and freedom from Roman legal structures within the Empire. (Note: Other sources dispute the contents of the supposed "treaty" and claim it was a Gothic surrender.)

=== Reign of Alaric I ===
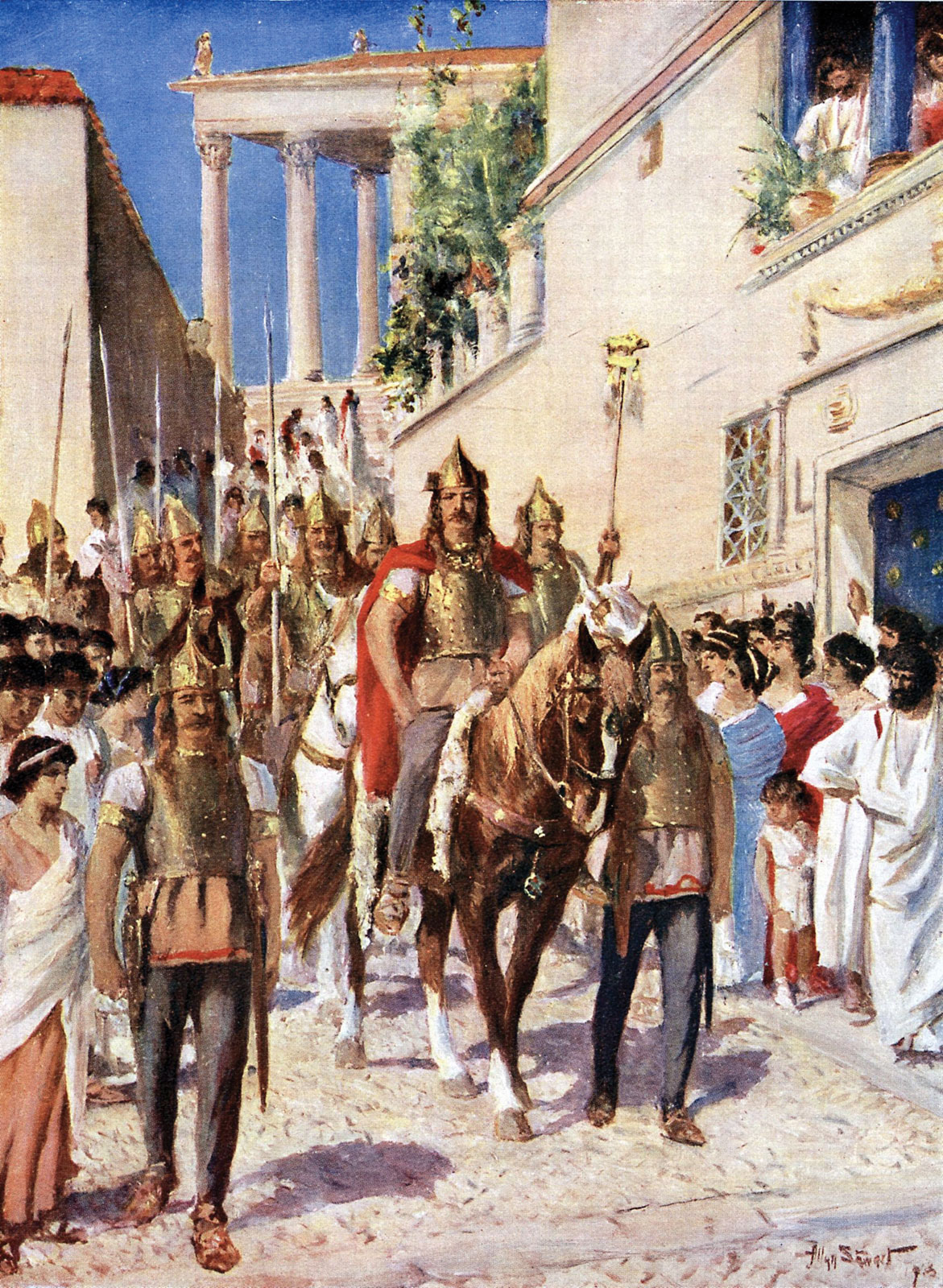
An illustration of Alaric entering Athens in 395

The new emperor, Theodosius I, made peace with the rebels, and this peace held essentially unbroken until Theodosius died in 395. In that year, the Visigoths' most famous king, Alaric I, made a bid for the throne, but controversy and intrigue erupted between the East and West, as General Stilicho tried to maintain his position in the empire. Theodosius was succeeded by his sons: Arcadius in the east and Honorius in the west. In 397, Alaric was named military commander of the eastern Illyrian prefecture by Arcadius.

Over the next 15 years, an uneasy peace was broken by occasional conflicts between Alaric and the powerful Germanic generals who commanded the Roman armies in the east and west, wielding the real power of the empire. Finally, after the western general Stilicho was executed by Honorius in 408 and the Roman legions massacred the families of thousands of barbarian soldiers who were trying to assimilate into the Roman empire, Alaric decided to march on Rome. After two defeats in Northern Italy and a siege of Rome ended by a negotiated pay-off, Alaric was cheated by another Roman faction. He resolved to cut the city off by capturing its port. On August 24, 410, however, Alaric's troops entered Rome through the Salarian Gate, and sacked the city. However, Rome, while still the official capital, was no longer the de facto seat of the government of the Western Roman Empire. From the late 370s up to 402, Milan was the seat of government, but after the siege of Milan the Imperial Court moved to Ravenna in 402. Honorius visited Rome often, and after his death in 423 the emperors resided mostly there. Rome's fall severely shook the Empire's confidence, especially in the West. Loaded with booty, Alaric and the Visigoths extracted as much as they could with the intention of leaving Italy from Basilicata to northern Africa. Alaric died before the disembarkation and was buried supposedly near the ruins of Croton. He was succeeded by his wife's brother.

=== Visigothic Kingdom ===
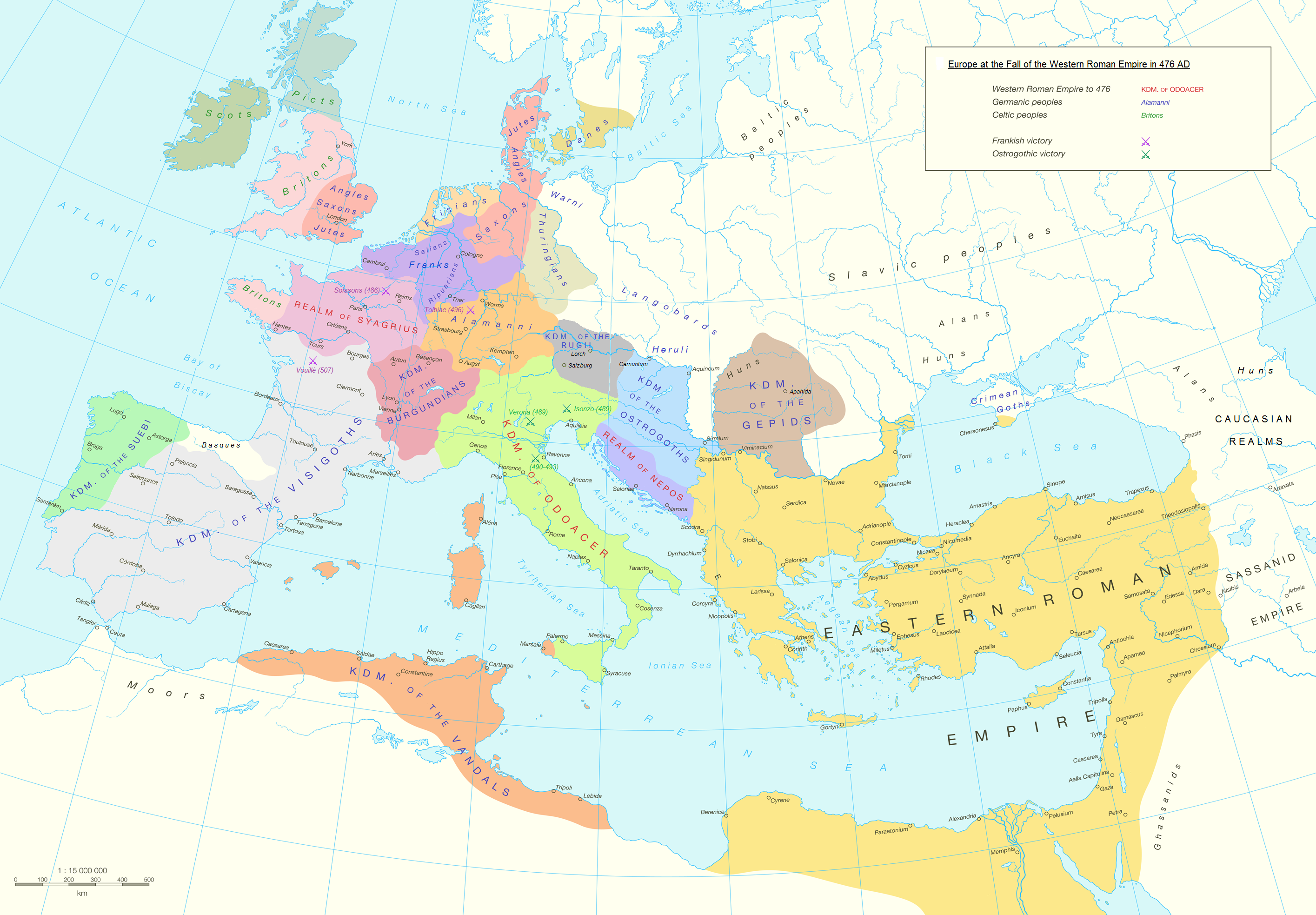
Europe at the fall of the Western Roman Empire in 476 AD

The Visigothic Kingdom was a Western European power in the 5th to 8th centuries, created first in Gaul, when the Romans lost their control of the western half of their empire and then in Hispania until 711. For a brief period, the Visigoths controlled the strongest kingdom in Western Europe. In response to the invasion of Roman Hispania of 409 by the Vandals, Alans, and Suebi, Honorius, the emperor in the West, enlisted the aid of the Visigoths to regain control of the territory. From 408 to 410 the Visigoths caused so much damage to Rome and the immediate periphery that nearly a decade later, the provinces in and around the city were only able to contribute one-seventh of their previous tax shares.

In 418, Honorius rewarded his Visigothic federates by giving them land in Gallia Aquitania on which to settle after they had attacked the four tribes—Suebi, Asding and Siling Vandals, as well as Alans—who had crossed the Rhine near Mogontiacum (modern Mainz) the last day of 406 and eventually were invited into Spain by a Roman usurper in the autumn of 409. The Visigoths devastated the latter two tribes before being recalled, a decision the Romans would regret as it allowed the Vandals to survive and in 429 cross into Africa which hastened the decline of the Western Empire. This was probably done under hospitalitas, the rules for billeting army soldiers. The settlement formed the nucleus of the future Visigothic kingdom that would eventually expand across the Pyrenees and onto the Iberian peninsula. That Visigothic settlement proved paramount to Europe's future as had it not been for the Visigothic warriors who fought side by side with the Roman troops under general Flavius Aetius, it is perhaps possible that Attila would have seized control of Gaul, rather than the Romans being able to retain dominance.

The Visigoths' second great king, Euric, unified the various quarreling factions among the Visigoths particularly in Hispania and in 475, after he subjugated the province, he concluded a peace treaty with the emperor Julius Nepos. In the treaty the emperor was called a friend (amicus) to the Visigoths, while requiring them to address him as lord (dominus). Though the emperor did not legally recognize Gothic sovereignty, according to some views under this treaty the Visigothic kingdom became an independent kingdom. Between 471 and 476, Euric captured most of southern Gaul. According to historian J. B. Bury, Euric was probably the "greatest of the Visigothic kings" for he managed to secure territorial gains denied to his predecessors and even acquired access to the Mediterranean Sea. At his death, the Visigoths were the most powerful of the successor states to the Western Roman Empire and were at the very height of their power. Not only had Euric secured significant territory, he and his son, Alaric II, who succeeded him, adopted Roman administrative and bureaucratic governance, including Rome's tax gathering policies and legal codes.

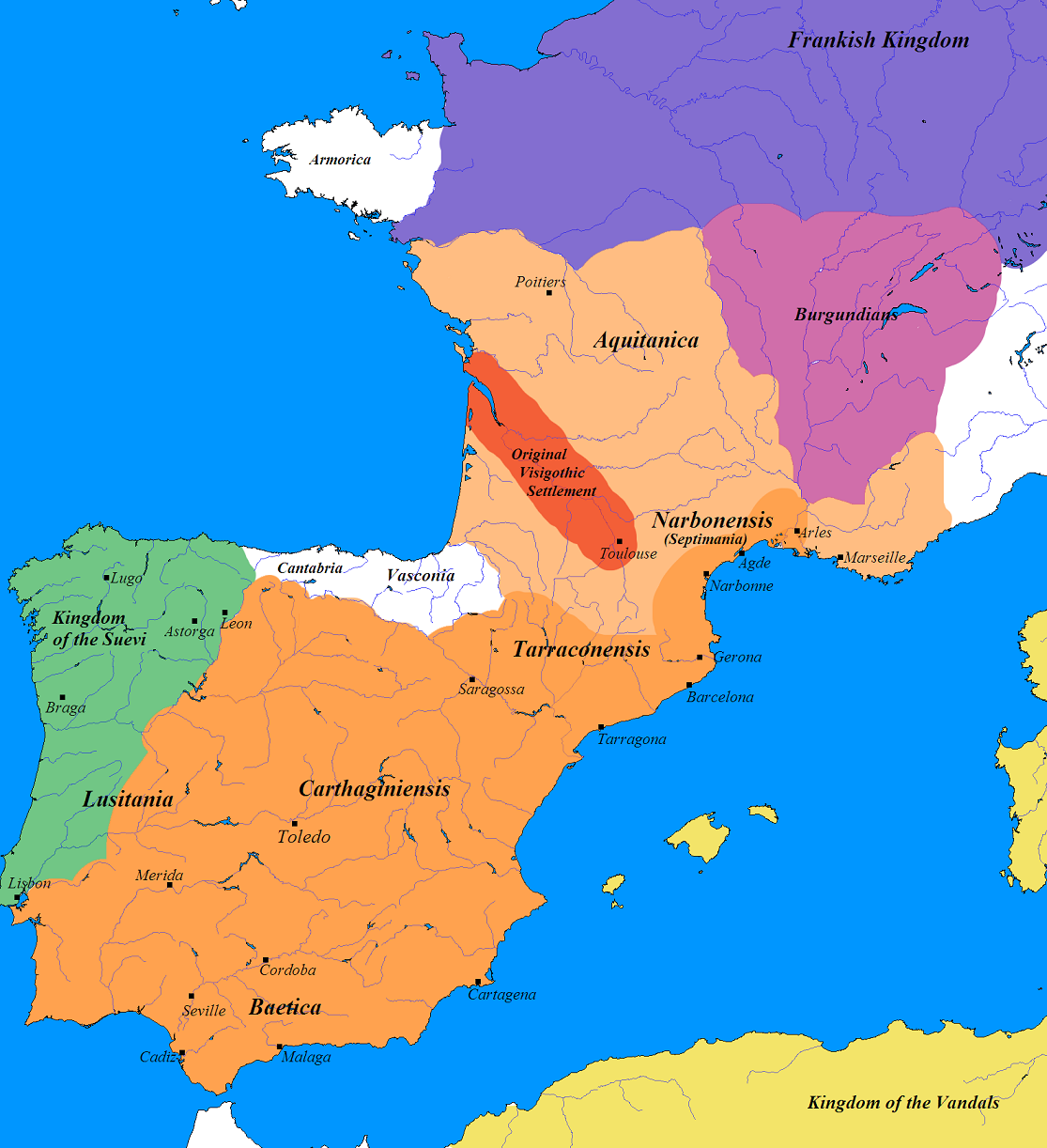
Greatest extent of the Visigothic kingdom of Toulouse in light and dark orange, c. 500. From 585 to 711 Visigothic Kingdom of Toledo in dark orange, green and white (Hispania)

At this point, the Visigoths were also the dominant power in the Iberian Peninsula, quickly crushing the Alans and forcing the Vandals into north Africa. By 500, the Visigothic Kingdom, centred at Toulouse, controlled Aquitania and Gallia Narbonensis and most of Hispania with the exception of the Kingdom of the Suebi in the northwest and small areas controlled by the Basques and Cantabrians. Any survey of western Europe taken during this moment would have led one to conclude that the very future of Europe itself "depended on the Visigoths". However, in 507, the Franks under Clovis I defeated the Visigoths in the Battle of Vouillé and wrested control of Aquitaine. King Alaric II was killed in battle. French national myths romanticize this moment as the time when a previously divided Gaul morphed into the united kingdom of Francia under Clovis.

Visigothic power throughout Gaul was not lost in its entirety due to the support from the powerful Ostrogothic king in Italy, Theodoric the Great, whose forces pushed Clovis I and his armies out of Visigothic territories. Theodoric the Great's assistance was not some expression of ethnic altruism, but formed part of his plan to extend his power across Spain and its associated lands.

After Alaric II's death, Visigothic nobles spirited his heir, the child-king Amalaric, first to Narbonne, which was the last Gothic outpost in Gaul, and further across the Pyrenees into Hispania. The center of Visigothic rule shifted first to Barcelona, then inland and south to Toledo. From 511 to 526, the Visigoths were ruled by Theoderic the Great of the Ostrogoths as de jure regent for the young Amalaric. Theodoric's death in 526, however, enabled the Visigoths to restore their royal line and re-partition the Visigothic kingdom through Amalaric, who incidentally, was more than just Alaric II's son; he was also the grandson of Theodoric the Great through his daughter Theodegotho. Amalaric reigned independently for five years. Following Amalaric's assassination in 531, another Ostrogothic ruler, Theudis took his place. For the next seventeen years, Theudis held the Visigothic throne.

Sometime in 549, the Visigoth Athanagild sought military assistance from Justinian I and while this aide helped Athanagild win his wars, the Romans had much more in mind. Granada and southernmost Baetica were lost to representatives of the Byzantine Empire (to form the province of Spania) who had been invited in to help settle this Visigothic dynastic struggle, but who stayed on, as a hoped-for spearhead to a "Reconquest" of the far west envisaged by emperor Justinian I. Imperial Roman armies took advantage of Visigothic rivalries and established a government at Córdoba.

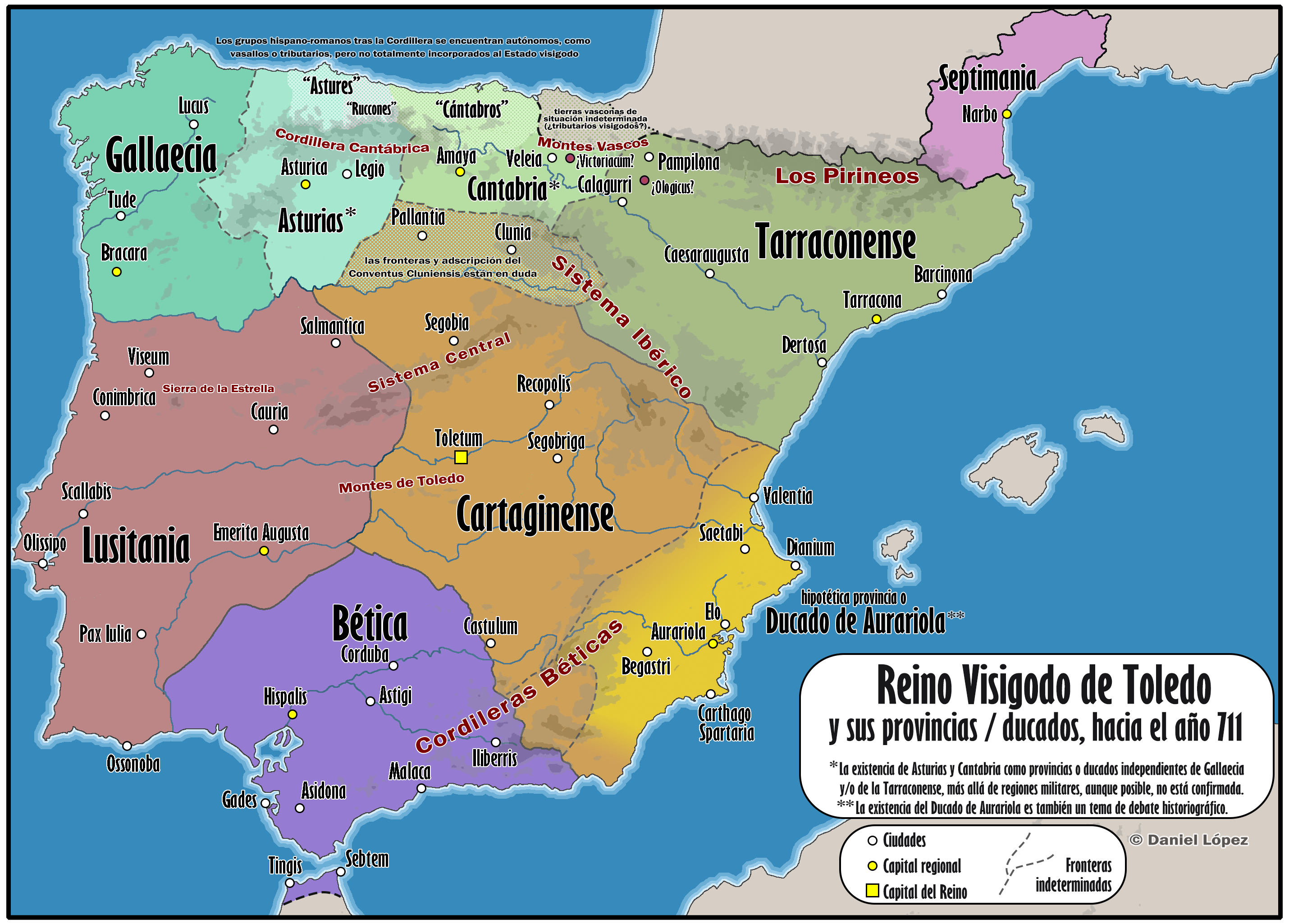
Visigothic Hispania and its regional divisions circa 711, before the Muslim conquest

The last Arian Visigothic king, Liuvigild, conquered most of the northern regions (Cantabria) in 574, the Suevic kingdom in 584, and regained part of the southern areas lost to the Byzantines, which King Suintila recovered in 624. Suintila reigned until 631. Generally speaking, the Visigothic monarchy in Hispania developed a sophisticated legal tradition that was fundamentally Roman in orientation. Rather than implementing a "Germanic" legal system, Visigothic kings built upon the legacy of imperial jurisprudence. Alaric II’s promulgation of the Breviarium Alaricianum was based heavily on the Codex Theodosianus, and his successors—including Liuvigild, Chindaswinth, and Recceswinth—continued to issue legal codifications that fused Roman civil law with Christian moral precepts. Far from representing a break with Roman law, these legal texts exemplify the adaptation and continuation of late Roman legal culture in a Gothic context, challenging older historiographical models that sought to sharply distinguish post-Roman "barbarian" governance from its imperial predecessor.

Only one historical source was written between the years 625 through 711, which comes from Julian of Toledo and only deals with the years 672 and 673. Wamba was the king of the Visigoths from 672 to 680. During his reign, the Visigothic kingdom encompassed all of Hispania and part of southern Gaul known as Septimania. Wamba was succeeded by King Ervig, whose rule lasted until 687. Collins observes that "Ervig proclaimed Egica as his chosen successor" on 14 November 687. In 700, Egica's son Wittiza followed him on the throne according to the Chronica Regum Visigothorum.

The kingdom survived until 711, when King Roderic (Rodrigo) was killed while opposing an invasion from the south by the Umayyad Caliphate in the Battle of Guadalete. This marked the beginning of the Umayyad conquest of Hispania, when most of the Iberian Peninsula came under Islamic rule in the early 8th century.

A Visigothic nobleman, Pelayo, defeated the Umayyad forces in the Battle of Covadonga in 718 and established the Kingdom of Asturias in the northern part of the peninsula. According to Joseph F. O'Callaghan, the remnants of the Hispano-Gothic aristocracy still played an important role in the society of Hispania. At the end of Visigothic rule, the assimilation of Hispano-Romans and Visigoths was occurring at a fast pace. Their nobility had begun to think of themselves as constituting one people, the gens Gothorum or the Hispani. An unknown number of them fled and took refuge in Asturias or Septimania. In Asturias they supported Pelagius's uprising, and joining with the indigenous leaders, formed a new aristocracy. The population of the mountain region consisted of native Astures, Galicians, Cantabri, Basques and other groups unassimilated into Hispano-Gothic society. Other Visigoths who refused to adopt the Muslim faith or live under their rule fled north to the kingdom of the Franks, and Visigoths played key roles in the empire of Charlemagne a few generations later. In the early years of the Emirate of Córdoba, a group of Visigoths who remained under Muslim dominance constituted the personal bodyguard of the Emir, al-Haras.

During their long reign in Spain, the Visigoths were responsible for the only new cities founded in Western Europe between the 5th and 8th centuries. It is certain (through contemporary Spanish accounts) that they founded four: Reccopolis, Victoriacum (modern Vitoria-Gasteiz, though perhaps Iruña-Veleia), Luceo and Olite. There is also a possible 5th city ascribed to them by a later Arabic source: Baiyara (perhaps modern Montoro). All of these cities were founded for military purposes and three of them in celebration of victory. Despite the fact that the Visigoths reigned in Spain for upwards of 250 years, there are few remnants of the Gothic language borrowed into Spanish. (Note: The Words such as: werra > guerra (war), falda > falda (skirt) and skankjan > escanciar (to pour out); See La época visigoda Susana Rodríguez Rosique (Spanish) in Cervantes Virtual. Accessed 15 October 2017.) (Note: The linguistic remnants of the Gothic people in Spain are sparse. A few place names and a mere handful of well-known "Spanish" first names, such as Alfonso, Fernando, Gonzalo, Elvira, and Rodrigo are of Germanic (Visigothic) origin.) The Visigoths as heirs of the Roman empire lost their language and intermarried with the Hispano-Roman population of Spain.

The medieval Spanish nobility has its most remote origin in the Visigothic Monarchy. After the Arab invasion of the peninsula in the eighth century, Christians were forced to retreat to the north of the peninsula where that primitive Visigoth nobility settled. Among these Christians who took refuge in the north were a large part of the nobles linked to the disappeared Visigoth monarchy of Don Rodrigo (King Roderic), and who were welcomed by the local population and later became part of the local nobility.

== Genetics ==
A genetic study published in Science in March 2019 analyzed the remains of eight Visigoths buried at Pla de l'Horta, dating to the 6th century. The genetic analysis of these individuals revealed that 73% of their ancestry derives from 7th-8th century Northeast Iberian populations (described as approximately 3/4 Iron-Age Iberian and 1/4 Central/Eastern Mediterranean). Additionally, 23% of their ancestry was linked to Central/Northern European populations, while the remaining 4% was traced to supplementary Central/Eastern Mediterranean origins.

== Culture ==
=== Law ===
The Visigothic Code of Law (Latin: Forum Iudicum), also called Liber Iudiciorum (English: Book of the Judges) and Lex Visigothorum (English: Law of the Visigoths), is a set of laws first promulgated by king Chindasuinth (642–653 AD) that had been part of aristocratic oral tradition and were set in writing in the year 654. This book survives in two separate codices preserved at el Escorial (Spain). It goes into more detail than a modern constitution commonly does and reveals a great deal about Visigothic social structure. The code abolished the old tradition of having different laws for Romans (leges romanae) and Visigoths (leges barbarorum), and under which all the subjects of the Visigothic kingdom ceased being romani and gothi and instead became hispani. All the kingdom's subjects were under the same jurisdiction, which eliminated social and legal differences and facilitated greater assimilation of the various population groups. The Visigothic Code marks the transition from Roman law to Germanic law.

One of the greatest contributions of the Visigoths to family law was their protection of the property rights of married women, which was continued by Spanish law and ultimately evolved into the community property system now in force throughout the majority of western Europe.

=== Religion ===
Before the Middle Ages, the Visigoths, as well as other Germanic peoples, followed what is now referred to as Germanic paganism. While the Germanic peoples were slowly converted to Christianity by varying means, many elements of the pre-Christian culture and indigenous beliefs remained firmly in place after the conversion process, particularly in the more rural and distant regions.

The Visigoths, Ostrogoths and Vandals were Christianized while they were still outside the bounds of the Roman Empire; however, they converted to Arianism rather than to the Nicene version (Trinitarianism) followed by most Romans, who considered them heretics. There was a religious gulf between the Visigoths, who had for a long time adhered to Arianism, and their Catholic subjects in Hispania. There were also deep sectarian splits among the Catholic population of the peninsula which contributed to the toleration of the Arian Visigoths on the peninsula. The Visigoths scorned to interfere among Catholics but were interested in decorum and public order. (Note: At least one high-ranking Visigoth, Zerezindo, dux of Baetica, was a Catholic in the mid-6th century.) King Liuvigild (568–586), attempted to restore political unity between the Visigothic-Arian elite and the Hispano-Roman Nicene Catholic population through a doctrinal settlement of compromise on matters of faith, but this failed. Sources indicate that the Iberian Visigoths maintained their Christian Arianism, especially the Visigothic elite until the end of Liuvigild's reign. When Reccared I converted to Catholicism, he sought to unify the kingdom under a single faith.

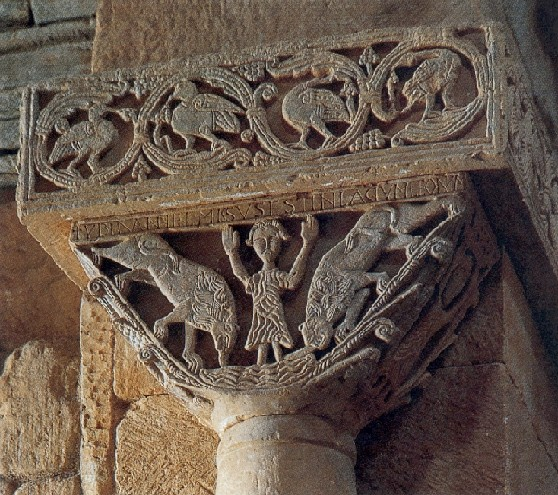
Capital from the Visigothic church of San Pedro de la Nave, province of Zamora

While the Visigoths retained their Arian faith, the Jews were well tolerated. Previous Roman and Byzantine law determined their status, and it already sharply discriminated against them, but royal jurisdiction was in any case quite limited: local lords and populations related to Jews as they saw fit. We read of rabbis being asked by non-Jews to bless their fields, for example. Historian Jane Gerber relates that some of the Jews "held ranking posts in the government or the army; others were recruited and organized for garrison service; still others continued to hold senatorial rank". In general, then, they were well respected and well treated by the Visigothic kings, that is, until their transition from Arianism to Catholicism. Conversion to Catholicism across Visigothic society reduced much of the friction between the Visigoths and the Hispano-Roman population. However, the Visigothic conversion negatively impacted the Jews, who came under scrutiny for their religious practices.

King Reccared convened the Third Council of Toledo to settle religious disputations related to the religious conversion from Arianism to Catholicism. The discriminatory laws passed at this Council seem not to have been universally enforced, however, as indicated by several more Councils of Toledo that repeated these laws and extended their stringency. These entered canon law and became legal precedents in other parts of Europe as well. The culmination of this process occurred under King Sisibut, who officially decreed a forced Christian conversion upon all Jews residing in Spain. This mandate apparently achieved only partial success: similar decrees were repeated by later kings as central power was consolidated. These laws either prescribed forcible baptism of the Jews or forbade circumcision, Jewish rites, and the observance of the Sabbath and other festivals. Throughout the 7th century the Jews were persecuted for religious reasons, had their property confiscated, were subjected to ruinous taxes, forbidden to trade and, at times, dragged to the baptismal font. Many were obliged to accept Christianity but continued privately to observe the Jewish religion and practices. The decree of 613 set off a century of difficulty for Spanish Jewry, which was only ended by the Muslim conquest. (Note: Cf. the extensive accounts of Visigothic Jewish history by Heinrich Graetz, History of the Jews, Vol. 3 (Philadelphia: Jewish Publication Society of America, 1956 reprint [1894]), pp. 43–52 (on Sisibut, pp. 47–49); Salo W. Baron, A Social and Religious History of the Jews, Vol. 3 (New York: Columbia University Press, 1957), pp. 33–46 (on Sisibut pp. 37–38); N. Roth, Jews, Visigoths and Muslims in Medieval Spain: Cooperation and Conflict (Leiden: Brill, 1994), pp. 7–40; Ram Ben-Shalom, "Medieval Jewry in Christendom," in M. Goodman, J. Cohen and D. Sorkin, The Oxford Handbook of Jewish Studies (Oxford: Oxford University Press, 2002), p. 156.)

The political aspects of the imposition of Church power cannot be ignored in these matters. With the conversion of the Visigothic kings to Chalcedonian Christianity, the bishops increased their power, until, at the Fourth Council of Toledo in 633, they selected a king from among the royal family, a practice previously reserved for nobles. This was the same synod that spoke out against those who had been baptized but had relapsed into Judaism. As far as the Visigoths were concerned, the time for religious pluralism "was past". By the end of the 7th century, Catholic conversion made the Visigoths less distinguishable from the indigenous Roman citizens of the Iberian peninsula; when the last Visigothic strongholds fell to the Muslim armies, whose subsequent invasions transformed Spain from the beginning of the 8th century, their Gothic identity faded.

In the eighth through 11th centuries, the muwallad clan of the Banu Qasi claimed descent from the Visigothic Count Cassius.

== Architecture ==
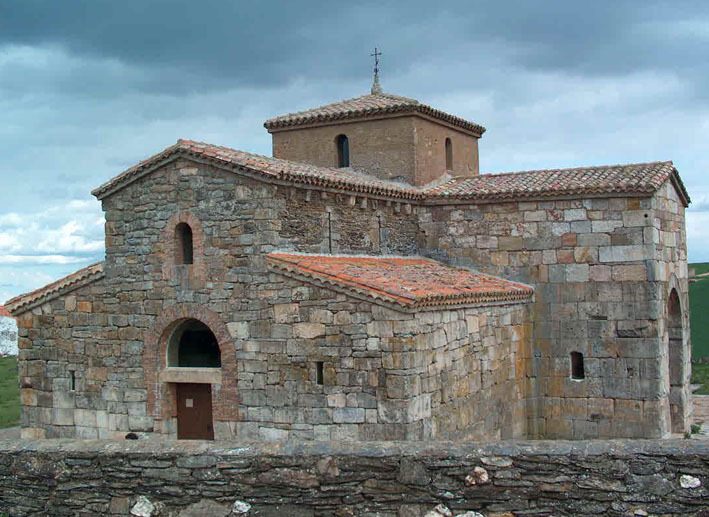
San Pedro de la Nave, a Visigothic church in Zamora, Spain

During their governance of Hispania, the Visigoths built several churches in the basilical or cruciform style that survive, including the churches of San Pedro de la Nave in El Campillo, Santa María de Melque in San Martín de Montalbán, Santa Lucía del Trampal in Alcuéscar, Santa Comba in Bande, and Santa María de Lara in Quintanilla de las Viñas. The Visigothic crypt (the Crypt of San Antolín) in the Palencia Cathedral is a Visigothic chapel from the mid-7th century, built during the reign of Wamba to preserve the remains of the martyr Saint Antoninus of Pamiers, a Visigothic-Gallic nobleman brought from Narbonne to Visigothic Hispania in 672 or 673 by Wamba himself. These are the only remains of the Visigothic cathedral of Palencia.

Reccopolis, located near the tiny modern village of Zorita de los Canes in the province of Guadalajara, Castile-La Mancha, Spain, is an archaeological site of one of at least four cities founded in Hispania by the Visigoths. It is the only city in Western Europe to have been founded between the 5th and 8th centuries. (Note: According to E. A Thompson, "The Barbarian Kingdoms in Gaul and Spain", Nottingham Mediaeval Studies, 7 (1963:4n11), the others were (i) Victoriacum, founded by Leovigild and may survive as the city of Vitoria, but a twelfth-century foundation for this city is given in contemporary sources, (ii) Lugo id est Luceo in the Asturias, referred to by Isidore of Seville, and (iii) Ologicus (perhaps Ologitis), founded using Basque labour in 621 by Suinthila as a fortification against the Basques, is modern Olite. All of these cities were founded for military purposes and at least Reccopolis, Victoriacum, and Ologicus in celebration of victory. A possible fifth Visigothic foundation is Baiyara (perhaps modern Montoro), mentioned as founded by Reccared in the fifteenth-century geographical account, Kitab al-Rawd al-Mitar, cf. José María Lacarra, "Panorama de la historia urbana en la Península Ibérica desde el siglo V al X," La città nell'alto medioevo, 6 (1958:319–358). Reprinted in Estudios de alta edad media española (Valencia: 1975), pp. 25–90.) The city's construction was ordered by the Visigothic king Liuvigild to honor his son Reccared and to serve as Reccared's seat as co-king in the Visigothic province of Celtiberia, to the west of Carpetania, where the main capital, Toledo, lay.

== Goldsmithery ==
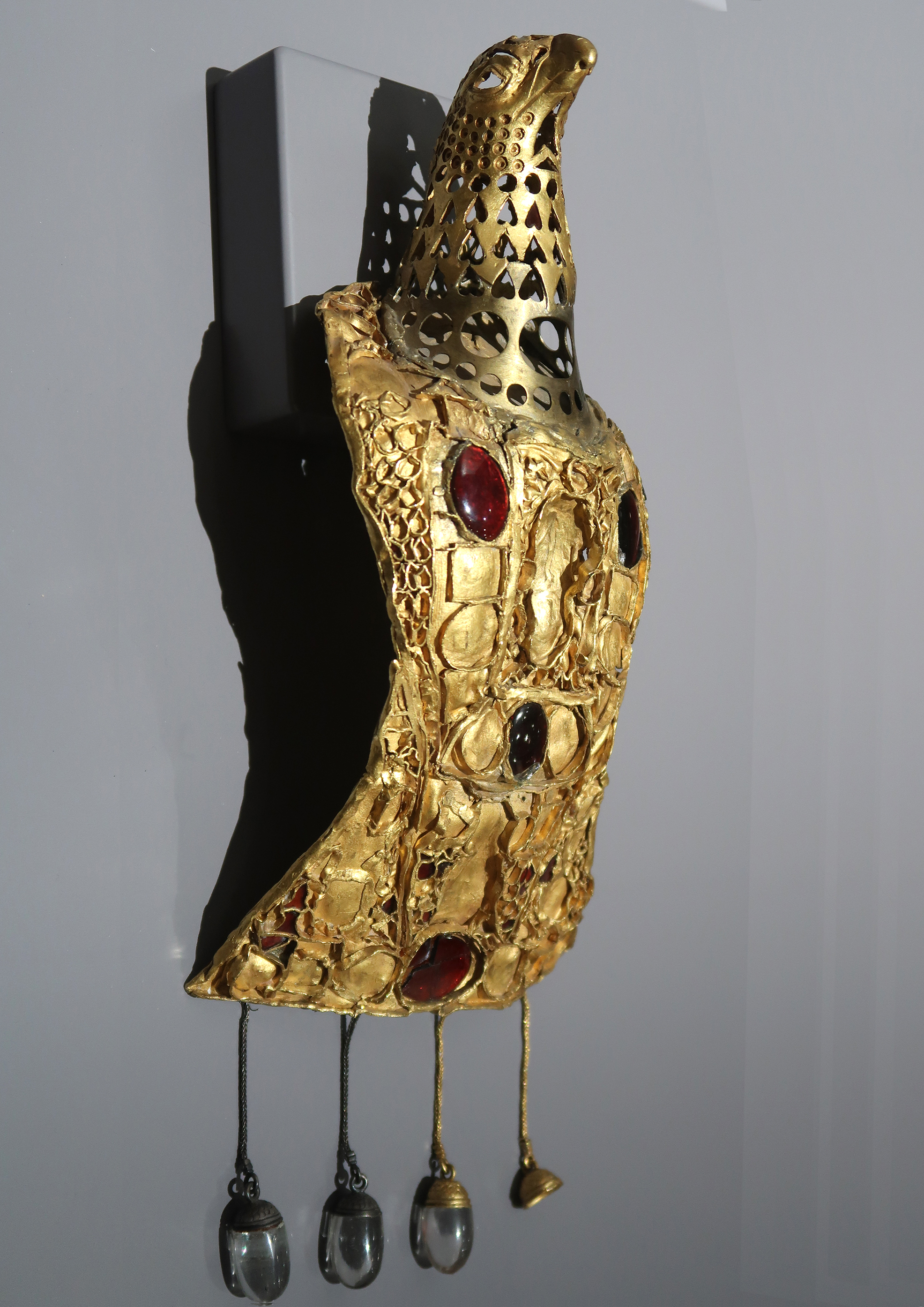
The Pietroasele Treasure discovered in Romania, attributed to the Visigoths

In Spain, an important collection of Visigothic metalwork was found in Guadamur, in the Province of Toledo, known as the Treasure of Guarrazar. This archeological find is composed of twenty-six votive crowns and gold crosses from the royal workshop in Toledo, with signs of Byzantine influence. According to Spanish archaeologists, this treasure represents the high point of Visigothic goldsmithery. The two most important votive crowns are those of Recceswinth and of Suintila, displayed in the National Archaeological Museum of Madrid; both are made of gold, encrusted with sapphires, pearls and other precious stones. The discoverer of the second lot gave Spanish Queen Elizabeth II some of the pieces that she still had in her possession, including the crown of Suintila, this crown was stolen in 1921 and never recovered. There are several other small crowns and many votive crosses in the treasure.

These findings, along with others from some neighbouring sites and with the archaeological excavation of the Spanish Ministry of Public Works and the Royal Spanish Academy of History (April 1859), formed a group consisting of:

- National Archaeological Museum of Spain: six crowns, five crosses, a pendant and remnants of foil and channels (almost all of gold).
- Royal Palace of Madrid: a crown and a gold cross and a stone engraved with the Annunciation. A crown and other fragments of a tiller with a crystal ball were stolen from the Royal Palace of Madrid in 1921 and its whereabouts are still unknown.
- National Museum of the Middle Ages, Paris: three crowns, two crosses, links and gold pendants.

The aquiliform (eagle-shaped) fibulae that have been discovered in necropolises such as Duratón, Madrona or Castiltierra (cities of Segovia), are an unmistakable example of the Visigothic presence in Spain. These fibulae were used individually or in pairs, as clasps or pins in gold, bronze and glass to join clothes, showing the work of the goldsmiths of Visigothic Hispania.

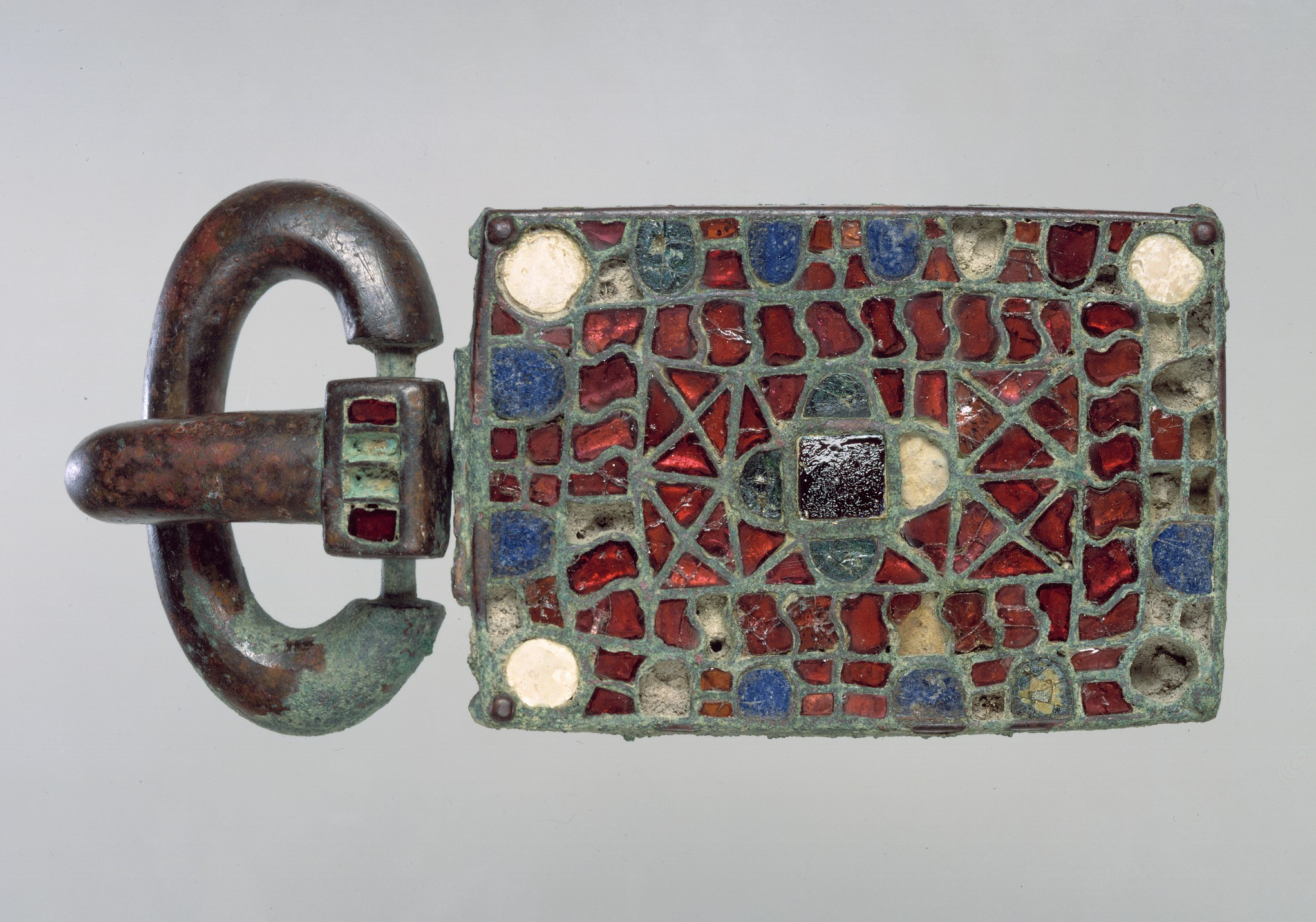
Visigothic belt buckle. Copper alloy with garnets, glass and inclusion of lapis lazuli. The Metropolitan Museum of Art (New York)

The Visigothic belt buckles, a symbol of rank and status characteristic of Visigothic women's clothing, are also notable as works of goldsmithery. Some pieces contain exceptional Byzantine-style lapis lazuli inlays and are generally rectangular in shape, with copper alloy, garnets and glass. (Note: Important findings have also been made in the Visigothic necropolis of Castiltierra (Segovia) in Spain.)

== See also ==
- Romano-Germanic culture
- Thiufa
- Muslim conquest of the Iberian Peninsula
- Visigothic art and architecture
- Visigothic script

== Bibliography ==
- Arce, Javier (1999). "The City of Merida (Emerita) in the Vitas Patrum Emeritensium (Vith Century)". In Chrysos, Euangelos K.; Wood, Ian N. (eds.). East and West: Modes of Communication : Proceedings of the First Plenary Conference at Merida. Brill. ISBN 978-90-04-10929-2.
- Bacoup, Paul (2015). "Les éléments de parure wisigoths en Hispania aux Ve et VIe siècles". Migrations barbares dans l'Empire romain d'occident.
- Balmaseda Muncharaz, Luis Javier (1996). "Las versiones del hallazgo del tesoro de Guarrazar" (PDF). Boletín del Museo Arqueológico Nacional (in Spanish). 14: 95–110. Archived from the original (PDF) on 12 July 2020.
- Barbero, Alessandro; Loring, Marie Isabel (2005). "The Formation of the Sueve and Visigothic Kingdoms in Spain". In Rosamond MicKitterick (ed.). The New Cambridge Medieval History. Vol. I [c.500–c.700]. Cambridge; New York: Cambridge University Press. ISBN 978-0-52136-291-7.
- Bardiès-Fronty, Isabelle (2015). Musée de Cluny: Le Guide. Paris: Editions de la Réunion des musées nationaux-Grand Palais. ISBN 978-2-7118-5631-2.
- Burns, Thomas (2003). Rome and the Barbarians, 100 B.C.–A.D. 400. Baltimore, MD: Johns Hopkins University Press. ISBN 978-0-80187-306-5.
- Bury, J. B. (2000). The Invasion of Europe by the Barbarians. New York: W.W. Norton & Company. ISBN 978-0-39300-388-8.
- Calderón Ortega, José Manuel (2009). "La nobleza en España: reflexiones en torno al nacimiento de un estamento privilegiado". In Luis Palacios Bañuelos; Ignacio Ruiz Rodríguez (eds.). La nobleza en España. Historia, presente y perspectivas de futuroactas del VI Curso de Verano Ciudad de Tarazona [The Nobility in Spain. History, Present and Future Perspectives Minutes of the VI Summer Course in the City of Tarazona] (in Spanish). Dykinson. ISBN 978-8-49849-727-4.
- Carr, Karen (2004). "Visigoths". In Peter Bogucki; Pam J. Crabtree (eds.). Ancient Europe, 8000 B.C.–A.D. 1000: Encyclopedia of the Barbarian World (Vol. 2, Bronze Age to Early Middle Ages). Vol. 2. New York: Thomson Gale. ISBN 0-684-31421-5.
- Christensen, Arne Søby (2002). Cassiodorus, Jordanes and the History of the Goths: Studies in a Migration Myth. Copenhagen: Museum Tusculanum Press. ISBN 978-8772897103.
- Claude, Dietrich (1998). "Remarks to the Relationship between Visigoths and Hispano-Romans in the seventh Century". In Walter Pohl; Helmut Reimitz (eds.). Strategies of Distinction: Construction of Ethnic Communities, 300–800 (The Transformation of the Roman World, vol. 2). Leiden: Brill Academic Publishers. ISBN 978-9-00410-846-2.
- Collins, Roger (1992). Law, Culture, and Regionalism in Early Medieval Spain. Great Yarmouth: Variorum. ISBN 0-86078-308-1.
- Collins, Roger (1995). The Arab Conquest of Spain, 710–797. Cambridge, MA: Blackwell Publishers. ISBN 978-0-63119-405-7.
- Collins, Roger (1999). Early Medieval Europe, 300–1000. New York: Palgrave Macmillan. ISBN 978-0-33365-808-6.
- Collins, Roger (2000). "Visigothic Spain, 409–711". In Raymond Carr (ed.). Spain: A History. New York: Oxford University Press. ISBN 978-0-19280-236-1.
- Collins, Roger (2004). Visigothic Spain, 409–711. Oxford: Blackwell Publishing. ISBN 0-631-18185-7.
- Coolidge, Grace (2011). Guardianship, Gender, and the Nobility in Early Modern Spain. Surrey and Burlington, VT: Ashgate. ISBN 978-1-40940-053-0.
- Durant, Will (1950). The Age of Faith. The Story of Civilization. Vol. IV. New York: Simon and Schuster. ASIN B000HFCEIO.
- Fletcher, Richard (2006). Moorish Spain. Berkeley, CA: University of California Press. ISBN 978-0-52024-840-3.
- Frassetto, Michael (2003). Encyclopedia of Barbarian Europe: Society in Transformation. Santa Barbara, CA: ABC-CLIO. ISBN 978-1-57607-263-9.
- Friedrich, Johann (1910). "Die sogenannte fränkische Völkertafel". Sitzungsberichte der Münchener Akademie der Wissenschaften. 11: 1–27.
- Fuller, J.F.C. (1998). Armaments & History. New York: Da Capo Press. ISBN 978-0-30680-859-3.
- Galeano, Rafael (2016). "Historia y arquitectura visigoda". Historia del Arte UNED (National University of Distance Education-Spain). Archived from the original on October 7, 2019.
- Georgescu, Vlad (1991). The Romanians. A History. Columbus: Ohio State University Press. ISBN 0814205119.
- Gerber, Jane (1992). The Jews of Spain: A History of the Sephardic Experience. New York: Free Press. ISBN 978-0-02911-573-2.
- Goffart, Walter (1983). "The Supposedly 'Frankish' Table of Nations: An Edition and Study". Frühmittelalterliche Studien. 17 (1): 98–130. doi:10.1515/9783110242164.98. S2CID 201734002.
- Gonzalez-Salinero, Raul (1999). "Catholic Anti-Judaism in Visigothic Spain". In Alberto Ferreiro (ed.). The Visigoths: Studies in Culture and Society. Leiden: Brill. ISBN 978-9-00411-206-3.
- Graetz, Heinrich (1894). History of the Jews. Vol. 3. Philadelphia: The Jewish Publication Society of America. ASIN B000JRBM60.
- Guerra, M.F; Galligaro, T.; Perea, A. (2007). "The Treasure of Guarrazar: Tracing the Gold Supplies in the Visigothic Iberian Peninsula". Archaeometry. 49 (1): 53–74. Bibcode:2007Archa..49...53G. doi:10.1111/j.1475-4754.2007.00287.x.
- Halsall, Guy (2007). Barbarian Migrations and the Roman West, 376–568. Cambridge and New York: Cambridge University Press. ISBN 978-0-52143-543-7.
- Heather, Peter (1998). The Goths. Oxford, UK: Blackwell Publishers. ASIN B00RWST3HE.
- Heather, Heather, ed. (1999). "The creation of the Visigoths". The Visigoths from the Migration Period to the Seventh Century: An Ethnographic Perspective. Boydell & Brewer. ISBN 978-0851157627.
- Heather, Peter (2005). The Fall of the Roman Empire: A New History of Rome and the Barbarians. Oxford and New York: Oxford University Press. ISBN 978-0-19515-954-7.
- Heather, Peter (2013). The Restoration of Rome: Barbarian Popes and Imperial Pretenders. Oxford and New York: Oxford University Press. ISBN 978-0-19936-851-8.
- Hillgarth, J. N. (2010). The Visigoths in History and Legend. Turnhout: Brepols Publishers. ISBN 978-0-88844-166-9.
- Howatson, M. C. (2011). "Visigoths". The Oxford Companion to Classical Literature (3 ed.). Oxford University Press. ISBN 978-0191739422.
- James, Edward (2009). Europe's Barbarians AD 200–600. New York: Routledge. ISBN 978-0-58277-296-0.
- Jordanes (1915). The Gothic History of Jordanes. Translated by Charles C. Mierow. London: Oxford University Press. OCLC 463056290.
- Katz, Solomon (1955). The Decline of Rome and the Rise of Mediaeval Europe. Ithaca, NY: Cornell University Press. ASIN B002S62FYI.
- Lim, Richard (1999). "Christian Triumph and Controversy". In G.W. Bowersock; Peter Brown; Oleg Grabar (eds.). Late Antiquity: A Guide to the Postclassical World. Cambridge, MA: The Belknap Press of Harvard University Press. ISBN 978-0-67451-173-6.
- Mathisen, Ralph W.; Sivan, Hagith S. (1999). "Forging a New Identity: The Kingdom of Toulouse and the Frontiers of Aquitania, 418–507". In Alberto Ferreiro (ed.). The Visigoths: Studies in Culture and Society. Leiden, Boston, Köln: Brill. ISBN 978-9-00411-206-3.
- Metropolitan Museum of Art. "Belt Buckle 550–600". The Metropolitan Museum of Art.
- Museo Arqueologico Nacional. "Tesoro de Guarrazar".
- Nadeau, Jean-Benoit; Barlow, Julie (2013). The Story of Spanish. New York: St. Martin's Press. ISBN 978-0-31265-602-7.
- O'Callaghan, Joseph (1975). A History of Medieval Spain. Ithaca, NY: Cornell University Press. ISBN 978-0-80149-264-8.
- Odobescu, Alexandru (1889). Le Trésor de Pétrossa. Étude sur l'orfèvrerie antique. Paris: Éditions J. Rothschchild.
- Olalde, Iñigo (March 15, 2019). "The genomic history of the Iberian Peninsula over the past 8000 years". Science. 363 (6432). American Association for the Advancement of Science: 1230–1234. Bibcode:2019Sci...363.1230O. doi:10.1126/science.aav4040. PMC 6436108. PMID 30872528.
- McColl, Hugh (March 14, 2024). "Steppe Ancestry in western Eurasia and the spread of the Germanic Languages". bioRxiv 10.1101/2024.03.13.584607.
- Ostler, Nicholas (2006). Empires of the Word: A Language History of the World. New York: Harper Perennial. ISBN 978-0-06093-572-6.
- Ripoll, Gisela (2011). "The Archaeological Characterisation of the Visigothic Kingdom of Toledo: The Question of the Visigothic Cemeteries". In Matthias Becher; Stefanie Dick (eds.). Reiche und Namen im frühen Mittelalter. Leiden: Brill. ISBN 978-3-77054-891-0.
- Roberts, J. M. (1997). A History of Europe. New York: Allen Lane. ISBN 978-0-96584-319-5.
- Roth, Norman (1994). Jews, Visigoths, and Muslims in Medieval Spain: Cooperation and Conflict. Leiden, New York, Köln: Brill. ISBN 978-9-00409-971-5.
- Salvador Conejo, Diego. "Cripta visigoda de San Antolín". Rutas con historia.
- Sarris, Peter (2002). "The Eastern Roman Empire from Constantine to Heraclius, 306–641". In Cyril Mango (ed.). The Oxford History of Byzantium. New York: Oxford University Press. ISBN 978-0-19814-098-6.
- Sivan, Hagith (1987). "On Foederati, Hospitalitas, and the Settlement of the Goths in A.D. 418". American Journal of Philology. 108 (4): 759–772. doi:10.2307/294799. hdl:1808/16687. JSTOR 294799.
- Stevenson, W. H. (1899). "The Beginnings of Wessex". The English Historical Review. 14 (53). Oxford, UK: Oxford University Press: 32–46. JSTOR 548095.
- Todd, Malcolm (2000). The Early Germans. Oxford, UK: Blackwell. ISBN 978-0-63119-904-5.
- Waldman, Carl; Mason, Catherine (2006). Encyclopedia of European Peoples. New York: Facts on File. ISBN 978-0816049646.
- Williams, Mark (2004). The Story of Spain. San Mateo, CA: Golden Era Books. ISBN 978-0-97069-692-2.
- Wolf, Kenneth Baxter (2014). Christian Martyrs in Muslim Spain. Cambridge and New York: Cambridge University Press. ISBN 978-1-10763-481-7.
- Wolfram, Herwig (1988). History of the Goths. Berkeley: University of California Press. ISBN 978-0-52005-259-8.
- Wolfram, Herwig (1997). The Roman Empire and its Germanic Peoples. Berkeley and Los Angeles: University of California Press. ISBN 0-520-08511-6.
- Wood, Ian (2025). Europe in Late Antiquity. Berlin and Boston: De Gruyter. ISBN 978-3-11035-264-1.
- Wood, Jamie (2012). The Politics of Identity in Visigothic Spain: Religion and Power in the Histories of Isidore of Seville. Brill. p. 16. ISBN 9789004209909.
