= Sulkiewicz =

Sulkiewicz may refer to the following persons:

- Aleksander Sulkiewicz, a politician of Lipka Tatar origin
- Maciej Sulkiewicz, a Tsarist general of Lipka Tatar origin
