= Ponza (disambiguation) =

Ponza is the largest island of the Italian Pontine Islands archipelago.

Ponza may also refer to:

- Ponza (municipality), the commune on Ponza, Italy
- Ponza, Bell County, Kentucky, United States
- Battle of Ponza (disambiguation), multiple battles

== People ==
- Lorenzo Ponza
- Michela Ponza

== See also ==
- Pons (disambiguation)
- Ponsa
