= Zerezindo =

Visigothic dux

Zerezindo (533/34 – 30 July 578) was a Visigothic dux (duke), probably of Baetica, where he was buried. His funerary inscription was found in the house once belonging to Juan Álvarez de Bohorques in Villamartín in Écija. It reads:

Α ✝ Ω
ZEREZINDO · DVX · FD
VIXIT ANNOS PLVS MINVS
XLIIII · OBIT · III · KAL · AG
ERA · D · C · XVI

The first line of the inscription, a symbol of Jesus Christ, shows the Greek letters alpha and omega on either side of a cross. The rest of the inscription reads "Zerezindo, duke, FD, lived forty-four years and died on the 3 kalends of August of the Era 616." The interpretation of "FD" has eluded scholars. Rodrigo Caro and Fray Christoval de San Antonio read it as filius ducis, "son of the duke", implying that Zerezindo's father was also a duke. Juan Francisco Masdeu reads it as Famulus Dei, "servant of God", and cites the inscription of a certain Exuperantius from the same year near Frexenal. It has also been interpreted as an abbreviation for fidelis, "faithful one, loyal one [of the king]".

The most interesting fact about Zerezindo is his Germanic name and the implication of his headstone that he was a Catholic at a time when most Visigoths were Arian Christians. This is especially noteworthy considering his high rank; a Catholic Goth had managed to ascend to the uppermost military rank in an Arian noble society.

Etymologically, Zerezindo's interesting name attests to his probable Gothic identity. His name has been normalised as Seresind (Seresindus). The Germanic root of its first component may be swērs ("swear"); or perhaps skari ("band"). The latter component comes from swinþs/ô ("strength").
