= PON =

PON or Pon may refer to:

== Places ==
- PON, the station code for Ponders End railway station in London, England

== People ==
- Pon (surname), including a list of people with the surname

== Arts, entertainment, and media ==
=== Fictional characters ===
- Pon, the Gardener's Boy of Jinxland in L. Frank Baum's The Scarecrow of Oz

=== Games ===
- Panel de Pon, a game series and the Japanese version of Tetris Attack

== Brands and enterprises ==
- Pon Holdings, a Dutch transportation company

== Medicine and science ==
- Paraoxonase, enzymes

== Organizations ==
- Polska Organizacja Narodowa, later Polish National Organization
- Program on Negotiation, a university consortium

== Technology ==
- Command to connect the Point-to-Point Protocol daemon
- Passive optical network in fiber optics

== Other uses ==
- A day in the Javanese calendar
- National Sports Week (Indonesia) (Pekan Olahraga Nasional)
- Pohnpeian language, ISO 639 code PON
- Polski Owczarek Nizinny, Polish for Polish Lowland Sheepdog
- Pon (deity), The Supreme Deity of the Yukaghir people

== See also ==
- Pon Pon, an Italian comic strip
- "Pon Pon Pon", a song by Kyary Pamyu Pamyu
