= Pontus (given name) =

Pontus is a masculine given name of Swedish origin. The name arose in Sweden through French nobleman Pontus De la Gardie: named Ponce in French, he transliterated his name that way rather than the standard Pontius. It was a relatively uncommon given name in Sweden, but came into greater usage there in the 1980s and 1990s. The name day for Pontus in Sweden is 20 November.

== List of people ==
- Pontus Åberg (born 1993), Swedish ice hockey player
- Pontus Åhman (born 1994), Swedish rally driver
- Pontus Almqvist (born 1999), Swedish footballer
- Pontus Andersson (born 1992), Swedish politician
- Pontus Andersson, Swedish guitarist for Dia Psalma
- Pontus Andreasson (born 1998), Swedish ice hockey player
- Pontus Artti (1878–1936), Finnish diplomat and writer
- Pontus Åsbrink (born 1992), Swedish footballer
- Pontus Aspgren (born 1991), Swedish speedway rider
- Pontus Assarsson (born 1979), Swedish musician
- Pontus Böckman (born 1964), Swedish economist
- Pontus Bodelsson (born 1967), Swedish businessman
- Pontus Bonnier (born 1954), Swedish businessman
- Pontus Braunerhjelm (born 1953), Swedish economist
- Pontus Brevern-de la Gardie (1814–1890), Swedish nobleman
- Pontus af Burén (1835–1905), Swedish landowner and politician
- Pontus Carle (born 1955), Swedish artist
- Pontus Carlsson (born 1982), Swedish chess player
- Pontus Dahlberg (born 1999), Swedish footballer
- Pontus Ludvig Dahlman (1812–1882), Finnish statesman
- Pontus Djanaieff (born 1967), Swedish comedian and clothing designer
- Pontus Egberg, Swedish bassist for The Poodles
- Pontus Ek (born 1975), Swedish rower
- Pontus Ekerljung (born 1982), Swedish radio host
- Pontus Eklöf (born 1998), Swedish ice hockey player
- Pontus Enhörning (born 1958), Swedish radio host and comedian
- Pontus Engblom (born 1991), Swedish footballer
- Pontus Fahlbeck (1850–1923), Swedish historian and political scientist
- Pontus Farnerud (born 1980), Swedish footballer
- Pontus Flodqvist (born 1988), Swedish swimmer
- Pontus Fontaeus (born 1966), Swedish car designer
- Pontus Fredricsson (born 1997), Swedish racing driver
- Pontus Frisk (born 1979), Swedish music producer
- Pontus Frithiof (born 1972), Swedish chef and restaurateur
- Pontus Fürstenberg (1827–1902), Swedish art collector and merchant
- Pontus De la Gardie (1520–1585), Swedish nobleman and general
- Pontus Fredrik De la Gardie (1726–91), Swedish nobleman
- Pontus Gårdinger (born 1964), Swedish television host
- Pontus Grate (1922–2018), Swedish art historian
- Pontus Gustafsson (born 1955), Swedish actor
- Pontus Haag (born 1983), Swedish politician
- Pontus Hammarén (born 1965), Swedish museum director
- Pontus Hanson (1894–1962), Swedish swimmer and water polo player
- Pontus Henriques (1852–1933), Swedish engineer and textbook author
- Pontus Heuterus (1535–1602), Dutch historian
- Pontus Hindrike (born 1990), Swedish footballer
- Pontus Hjorthén-Nilsson (born 1970), Swedish child actor
- Pontus Holmberg (born 1999), Swedish ice hockey player
- Pontus Holmgren (born 1964), Swedish musician
- Pontus Hultén (1924–2006), Swedish art collector and museum director
- Pontus Jansson (born 1991), Swedish footballer
- Pontus Jäntti (born 1968), Finnish badminton player
- Pontus Johansson (born 1991), Swedish ice hockey player
- Pontus Johnson (born 1970), Swedish professor
- Pontus Kåmark (born 1969), Swedish footballer
- Pontus Karlsson (born 1983), Swedish footballer
- Pontus Kastemyr (born 1995), Swedish cyclist
- Pontus Kjerrman (born 1954), Swedish-Danish artist and art educator
- Pontus Kyander (born 1959), Finnish art historian
- Pontus Lanner (1880–1944), Swedish painter
- Pontus Leander (1872–1935), Swedish orientalist and professor
- Pontus Karl Johan Lidberg (born 1977), Swedish choreographer and dancer
- Pontus Lindwall (born 1965), Swedish civil engineer
- Pontus Ljungberg (1945–2023), Swedish artist and architect
- Pontus Lund (born 1990), Swedish wrestler
- Pontus Lundkvist (born 1971), Swedish cartoonist, film maker and musician
- Pontus Mattsson (born 1965), Swedish journalist
- Pontus Mellegård (born 1990), Swedish handball player
- Pontus Molander (born 1964), Swedish ice hockey player
- Pontus Möller (1921–2009), Swedish genealogist
- Pontus Morén (born 1984), Swedish-Italian ice hockey player and coach
- Pontus Netterberg (born 1992), Swedish ice hockey player
- Pontus Nilsson (born 1982), Swedish track and field sprinter
- Pontus Norgren (born 1968), Swedish power metal guitarist
- Pontus Nyholm (born 1998), Swedish golfer
- Pontus T. Pagler (born 1987), Swedish actor
- Pontus Palmgren (1907–1993), Finnish ornithologist
- Pontus Heinrich Johannes Paucker (1823–1855), Estonian clergyman
- Pontus Petterström (born 1982), Swedish ice hockey player
- Pontus Platin (born 1954), Swedish artist
- Pontus Plænge (born 1971), Swedish actor and director
- Pontus Purokuru (born 1987), Finnish writer
- Pontus Qvarnström (1872–1918), Swedish tennis player
- Pontus Renholm (born 1986), Swedish swimmer
- Pontus Reuterswärd (1871–1949), Swedish military officer
- Pontus Rödin (born 2000), Swedish footballer
- Pontus Sandström (1875–1952), Swedish jurist and politician
- Pontus Schultz (1972–2012), Swedish journalist and businessman
- Pontus Segerström (1981–2014), Swedish footballer
- Pontus Stierna (1951–2020), Swedish medic and professor
- Pontus Själin (born 1996), Swedish ice hockey player
- Pontus Sjöbeck (1850–1929), Swedish librarian
- Pontus Sjögren (born 1985), Swedish ice hockey player
- Pontus Sjöman (born 1971), Swedish film producer
- Pontus Silfwer (born 1991), Swedish footballer
- Pontus Skoglund (born 1984), Swedish geneticist
- Pontus Skrivare (1897–1971), Swedish editor and playwright (born Helmer Jarl Wahlroos)
- Pontus Ståhlkloo (born 1973), Swedish snowboarder
- Pontus Stenshäll (born 1966), Swedish theatre director and actor
- Pontus Ströbaek (born 1970), Swedish actor and director
- Pontus Strömvall (1886–1962), Swedish painter
- Pontus Thomée (born 1987), Swedish javelin thrower
- Pontus Tidemand (1990), Swedish rally driver
- Pontus Tunander (1957–2011), Swedish painter and writer
- Pontus de Tyard (1512–1605), French poet and priest
- Pontus von Rosen (1881–1951), Swedish fencer
- Pontus Wernbloom (born 1986), Swedish footballer
- Pontus Widén (1920–1983), Swedish bandy player and sports executive
- Pontus Wikner (1837–1888), Swedish lecturer
- Pontus Zetterman (born 1994), Swedish handball player

=== Middle name ===
- Carl Pontus Gahn (1759–1825), Swedish military officer
- Carl Pontus Lilliehorn (1758–1820), Swedish soldier
- Christian-Pontus Andersson (born 1977), Swedish artist
- Didrik Pontus af Burén (1802–1878), Swedish mill owner and politician
- Gustav Pontus Bagge (1839–1915), Swedish soldier and artist
- Hjalmar Pontus Alner (1878–1952), Swedish priest and psalm writer
- Jakob Pontus Stenbock (1744–1824), Swedish nobleman and military officer
- Klas Pontus Arnoldson (1844–1916), Swedish author, journalist, and politician

== See also ==
- Pontus (disambiguation)
- Pontius (disambiguation)
