= Ponciano =

Ponciano may refer to:

- Girau do Ponciano, a municipality in the western of the Brazilian state of Alagoas
- Ponciano Arriaga International Airport, an international airport at San Luis Potosí, San Luis Potosí, Mexico
- San Ponciano church, a chapel in La Plata, Argentina

== People with the name ==
- Élmer Ponciano (born 1978), Guatemalan football defender
- Selvyn Ponciano (born 1973), retired Guatemalan football defender
- Ponciano Arriaga (1811–1865), lawyer and politician from San Luis Potosí
- Ponciano B.P. Pineda, Filipino writer, teacher, linguist and lawyer
- Ponciano Bernardo (1905–1949), Filipino engineer and politician who served as mayor of Quezon City
- Ponciano Leiva (1821–1896), President of Honduras 1874–1876 and 1891–1893

== See also ==
- Ponce (disambiguation)
- Pons
- Pontian (disambiguation)
- Pontianus (disambiguation)
