= Aleksander Sulkiewicz =

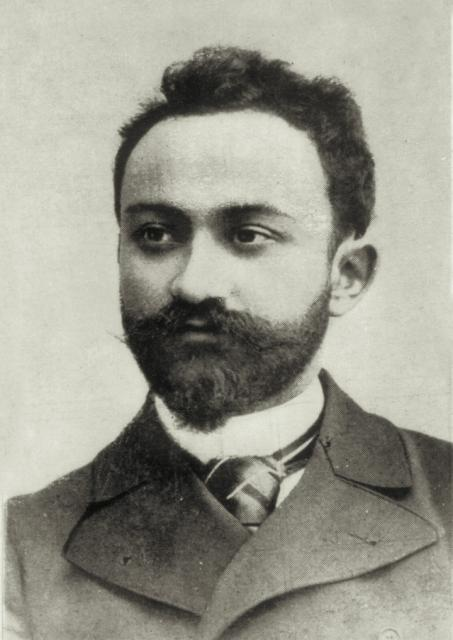
- Aleksander Sulkiewicz in 1900

Personal details
- Born: 8 December 1867 Skirsobole Tatarskie, Congress Poland
- Died: 18 September 1916 (aged 48) Sitowicze, Russian Empire
- Resting place: Powązki Military Cemetery
- Party: Polish Socialist Party
- Occupation: Politician

Iskander Mirza Huzman Beg Sulkiewicz (8 December 1867 – 18 September 1916), known as Aleksander Sulkiewicz, was a Polish politician of Lipka Tatar ethnicity who campaigned for Polish independence and co-founded the Polish Socialist Party.

== Early life ==
Sulkiewicz was born in Skirsobole Tatarskie, Congress Poland (now part of Lithuania) to a Tatar family with a tradition of support for the cause of Polish independence. He was the son of Maciej Sulkiewicz, son of Józef, and Rozalia née Kryczyńska, daughter of Aleksander (Kryczyńska is a feminine form of Kryczyński, one of the few Tatar families officially acknowledged as princes by the Polish–Lithuanian Commonwealth). His great-great-grandfather was Józef Bielak, a general in the Kościuszko Uprising, and one of the family's most cherished possessions was a letter from Tadeusz Kościuszko thanking Bielak for his service.

As a child, Sulkiewicz attended a Turkish school in Istanbul, where he came into contact with the Polish émigré community. After his father died around 1877, he and his family moved to Suwałki, and later to Sejny, where he continued his studies.

== Underground political activity ==
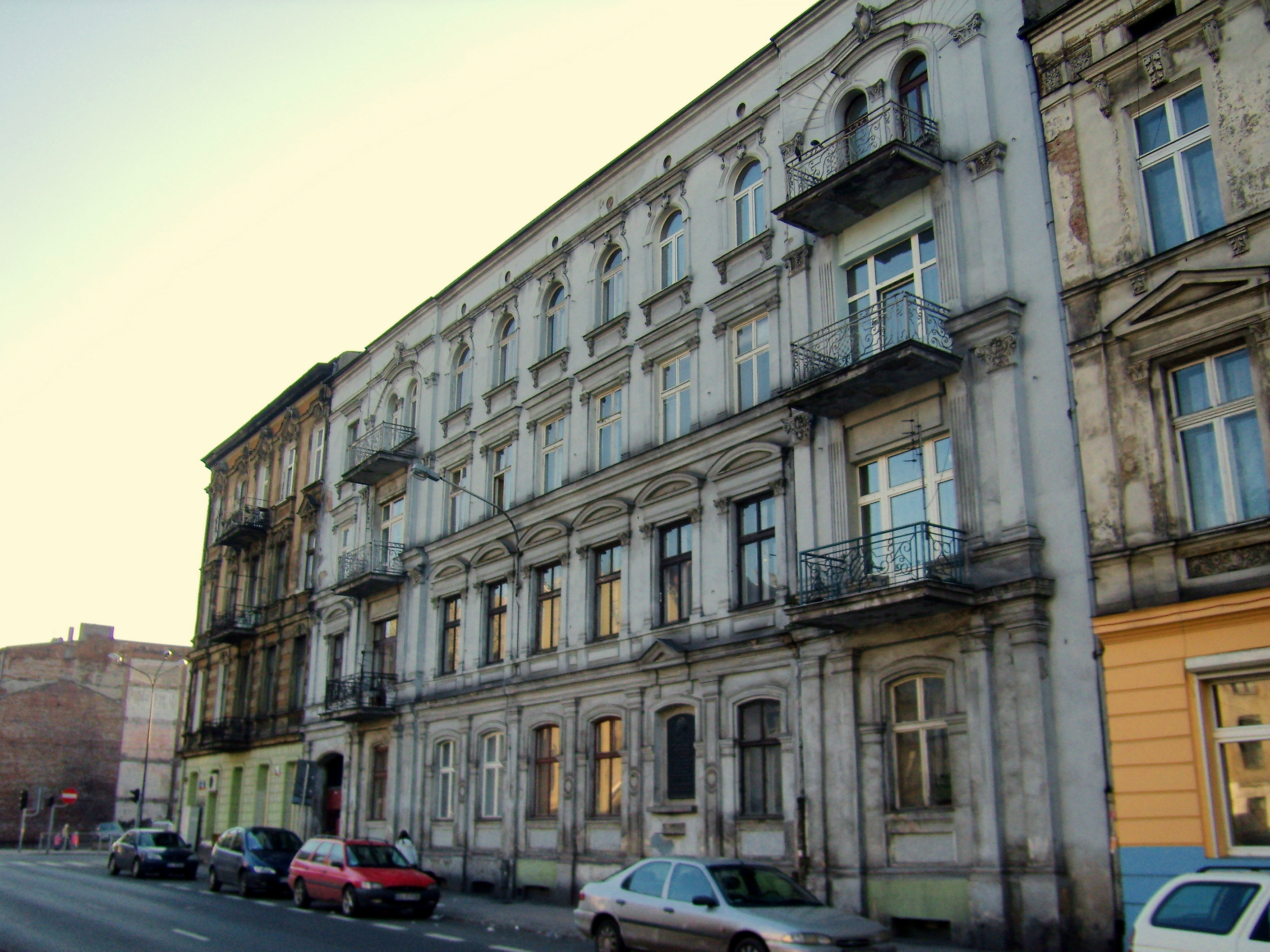
The former site of the Robotnik underground print shop on Wschodnia Street in Łódź, pictured in 2008.

In Vilnius, then part of Poland, Sulkiewicz was introduced into socialist circles and became an active member of the Social-Revolutionary Party Proletariat. In November 1892, he attended the Paris convention that created the Organization of Polish Socialists Abroad (Polish: Związek Zagraniczny Socjalistów Polskich). Upon returning to Poland, he helped organize Polish Socialist Party (PPS) groups in Vilnius. With Józef Piłsudski, Stanisław Wojciechowski, Stefan Bielak and Ludwik Zajkowski, he took part in a meeting in a forest near Vilnius that was later recognized as the First Congress of the PPS.

He got a job in the treasury department in Suwałki in 1890, and later in the customs offices in Władysławowo and Kiborty. Using these positions, he took charge of smuggling the publications of the underground socialist press from Geneva and London into Congress Poland. He also helped Lithuanian nationalists smuggle in Lithuanian-language publications that were banned by Russian authorities. Partly because Russian officials did not expect a Muslim like Sulkiewicz to be involved in Polish independence campaigns, he was able to continue his clandestine conspiratorial activities for an extended period without being detected. From 1895 to 1897, and again from 1899 to 1902, he was a member of the Central Committee of the PPS.

He left his customs job in 1900 and, on party orders, moved to Łódź, where he set up a printing shop for the Robotnik newspaper. With Piłsudski, he composed and edited the first issue of the paper. The print shop was soon discovered by the Czarist police, and while Sulkiewicz managed to evade arrest, Piłsudski was caught. With help from others, such as Władysław Mazurkiewicz, Sulkiewicz began making plans for Piłsudski's escape. It occurred on 14 May 1901, after Piłsudski feigned mental illness in order to get himself transferred from the Warsaw Citadel to a lower-security mental hospital in Saint Petersburg. The escape may have saved Piłsudski's life, because Poland was under martial law, and conspiratorial activity was harshly punished.

In 1903, Sulkiewicz rejoined the Central Committee of the PPS, this time in Kiev. He was caught by the police, but thanks to good recommendations from his previous places of work, he was freed after a few months with a warning. Soon after, there was a split within the PPS, and Sulkiewicz followed Piłsudski in joining the pro-independence (as opposed to pro-internationalist) PPS Revolutionary Faction. In 1908, he became a member of its Central Committee.

== World War I and death ==
When World War I broke out, Sulkiewicz volunteered for the Polish Legions. After the creation of Polish National Organization, he became its director in the Vilnius region and traveled on diplomatic missions to Berlin, Copenhagen, Sweden and Kiev. He then went to Galicia and, from there, was sent by Piłsudski to German-controlled Warsaw, where he was active in the Polish Military Organisation (Polska Organizacja Wojskowa) and the PPS. He was arrested by the German authorities in November 1915 but eventually released.

After his release, Sulkiewicz moved to Austria-occupied Poland to fight with the Polish Legions again. He was initially made an intendant (a manager) in May 1916. Later, however, after being refused twice because of his age (he was 48 at the time), he was given a front-line position as a sergeant in the First Brigade of the Polish Legions. On 18 September 1916, during the Battle of Sitowicze, he was mortally wounded while running to help an injured chorąży, Adam Koc.

On 8 November 1925 Sulkiewicz's body was moved to Warsaw and buried in the Powązki Military Cemetery. He was posthumously awarded the Virtuti Militari and the Cross of Independence with Swords.
