= Pontus =

Pontus or Pontos may refer to:

- Short Latin name for the Pontus Euxinus, the Greek name for the Black Sea (a.k.a. the Euxine sea)
- Pontus (mythology), a sea god in Greek mythology
- Pontus (region), on the southern coast of the Black Sea, in modern-day Turkey
- Kingdom of Pontus or Pontic Empire, a state founded in 281 BC
- Diocese of Pontus, a diocese of the later Roman Empire
- Republic of Pontus, a proposed Pontic Greek state discussed in 1919
- Pontus (given name), a Swedish masculine given name
- Pontos (film), a 2008 dramatic short film

== See also ==
- Pontic Greeks, Pontian Greeks or Pontians, an ethnically Greek group who traditionally lived in the region of the Black Sea
- Bithynia and Pontus, a Roman province
- Pontic (disambiguation), the corresponding adjective
