= Władysław Mazurkiewicz (physician) =

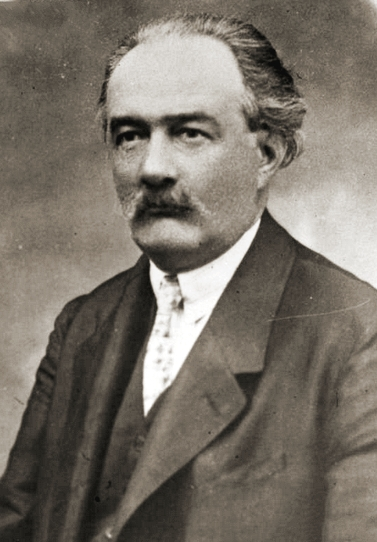
- 1928
- Born: September 23, 1871; Ovruchsky Uyezd, Russian Empire
- Died: August 6, 1933 (aged 61); Warsaw, Poland

Academic background
- Education: S. M. Kirov Military Medical Academy

Władysław Mazurkiewicz (23 September 1871 – 6 August 1933) was a Polish physician and professor of pharmacognosy and medical botany at the University of Warsaw. He was also a founder of the centrist Polish political party National-State Union in 1922.

== Early life and career ==
Mazurkiewicz was the son of Jan and Alojza Ramuld-Wiszniewski. He attended a classical middle school in Mazyr and finished his secondary schooling in Saint Petersburg. He subsequently enrolled in Faculty of Mathematics and Natural Sciences at the Saint Petersburg State University to study the natural sciences. However, he did not finish this course and instead commenced at the S. M. Kirov Military Medical Academy.

After finishing his first year of study, Mazurkiewicz took part in student strike in 1892. He was a member of a student circle which concerned itself with politics and self-education, as well as the Polish Socialist Party (PPS). His political activities during this time included, from 1900, smuggling illegal literature from Finland to Russia. He completed his studies in 1900.

Following the completion of his studies, he temporarily stayed in Saint Petersburg at the request of the PPS to, together with Aleksander Sulkiewicz, help Józef Piłsudski escape from a mental hospital in the city, to which Piłsudski had been transferred from the Warsaw Citadel after feigning mental illness. Mazurkiewicz used his father's contacts in Saint Petersburg to obtain employment as a doctor in the hospital and soon became head of the psychiatry department. During a shift in May 1901, he led Piłsudski out of the hospital. The following day, a newspaper published information about the escape and named Mazurkiewicz as conspirator. Mazurkiewicz escaped and hid in Austrian Galicia, after which he studied in Vienna and Prague.

In 1903, in Katowice, he edited the socialist newspaper Gazeta Robotnicza. During the Russian Revolution of 1905 he kept in contact with the PPS leadership in Congress Poland, smuggled underground publications over the border and was nominated to command the Łomża district in the event of an uprising.

== Academic career ==
In 1905 Mazurkiewicz moved to Lviv, where he became an assistant to Professor Leon Popielski at the Institute of Pharmacology and Pharmacognosy. His work focused on the physiology of the pancreas and salivary glands. He also continued his involvement in the PPS. In 1907 he went to Bern, Switzerland, to specialize in pharmacognostics under the tutelage of Alexander Tschirch. Mazurkiewicz obtained his doctorate in 1909 and subsequently completed his habilitation in Lviv. Having obtained a scholarship with the Academy of Learning, he then travelled to Zurich.

On 16 August 1914, Emperor Franz Joseph I appointed him as an associate professor of pharmacognosy at the University of Lviv. During this time, he sought reform of pharmaceutical studies. In 1916 he was appointed a lecturer in pharmacognosy at the University of Warsaw. He distinguished himself as a teacher, scientist and organizer of medical- pharmaceutical studies.

In the years 1917–1919 he was Dean of the Faculty of Medicine at the University of Warsaw. He became chairman of the State Pharmacopoeia Commission, a role he continued in until 1933. The committee produced the first edition of the Polish Pharmacopoeia.

During the Polish-Soviet War, he was a member of the Capital Defense Council and organized sanitary units.

In 1919 he was appointed Professor of pharmacognosy, and additionally in 1922 of medical botany. On 19 October 1920, he was appointed Director of the University of Warsaw's Pharmacy Division of the Faculty of Medicine. His campaign for reform of pharmaceutical studies contributed to the establishment of the first independent Faculty of Pharmacy at the University of Warsaw, which was established on 29 January 1926. He became the Faculty's first Dean.

He is buried at Powązki Cemetery.
