= Pontiac =

Pontiac most often refers to:

- Pontiac (Odawa leader) (c. 1714 to 1720 – 1769), Native American war chief
- Pontiac (automobile), a former General Motors brand

Pontiac may also refer to:

== Places and jurisdictions ==
=== Canada ===
- Pontiac, Quebec, a municipality
  - Apostolic Vicariate of Pontiac, now the Roman Catholic Diocese of Pembroke
- Pontiac Regional County Municipality, Quebec, an administrative division
- Pontiac (federal electoral district), in Quebec
- Pontiac (provincial electoral district), in Quebec

=== United States ===
- Pontiac, Illinois
  - Pontiac Correctional Center, a prison in Illinois
- Pontiac, Indiana
- Pontiac, Kansas
- Pontiac, Michigan
  - Pontiac Silverdome, a former stadium in Michigan
- Pontiac, New York
- Pontiac, Rhode Island
- Pontiac, South Carolina, an unincorporated community in Richland County
- Pontiac Building, a registered historic high-rise in Chicago, Illinois
- Pontiac Mills, a historic textile mill complex in Rhode Island

== Amtrak stations ==
- Pontiac station (Illinois)
- Pontiac Transportation Center, in Michigan

== Other uses ==
- Pontiac (album), 1987, by Lyle Lovett
- USS Pontiac, any of several United States Navy ships
- Marvin Pontiac, a fictional character created by musician John Lurie
- Pontiac fever, a form of legionellosis

== See also ==
- Pontic (disambiguation)
- Pontiak
- Pontac
