= Battle of Ponza =

There are three battles with this name, occurring near the island of Ponza:

- Battle of Ponza (1300)
- Battle of Ponza (1435)
- Battle of Ponza (1552)
