= Ponce =

Ponce may refer to:

- Ponce (surname)
- Ponce (streamer) (born 1991), French streamer
- Ponce, Puerto Rico, a city in Puerto Rico
  - Ponce High School
  - Ponce massacre, 1937
- USS Ponce, several ships of the US Navy
- Manuel Ponce, a Mexican composer active in the 20th century
- British and Irish slang for a pimp, also used figuratively to refer to an effeminate man
- Chaudin, cajun food, also referred to as ponce

== See also ==
- Ponce Inlet, Florida, a town in Florida, US
- Ponce de León (disambiguation)
- Ponce de Leon, Florida, a town in Florida, US
- Ponce de Leon, Missouri, an unincorporated community in Missouri, US
- Ponce de Leon Avenue, Atlanta, Georgia, US
- Ponce de Leon Bay, a bay in Florida, US
- Ponce de Leon Springs State Recreation Area, Holmes County, Florida, US
