= Pontic =

Pontic, from the Greek pontos (πόντος, romanized: póntos), or "sea", may refer to:

== The Black Sea ==
=== Places ===
- The Pontic colonies, on its northern shores
- Pontus (region), a region on its southern shores
- The Pontic–Caspian steppe, steppelands stretching from north of the Black Sea as far east as the Caspian Sea
- The Pontic Mountains, a range of mountains in northern Turkey, close to the southern coast of the Black Sea

=== Languages and peoples ===
- Pontic Greeks, all Greek peoples from the shores of the Black Sea and Pontus
- Pontic Greek, a form of the Greek language originally spoken by the Pontic Greeks (see above)
- Pontic, as opposed to Caspian (which refers to the possibly related Nakho-Dagestanian or Northeast Caucasian languages), is sometimes used as a synonym for the Northwest Caucasian language family.
- Pontic languages, the hypothetical language family linking the Northwest Caucasian and Indo-European languages, and Proto-Pontic, the Pontic proto-language, is the reconstructed common ancestor of Proto-Northwest Caucasian and Proto-Indo-European.

== Other uses ==
- Pontic, a false tooth used within a dental bridge
- Pontic, formerly known as Mutual FC, a Hong Kong Second Division League association football team

== See also ==
- Pontiac (disambiguation)
- Pontian (disambiguation)
- Pontus (disambiguation)
