= Polish National Organization =

1910s Polish political organization

Polish National Organization (Polish: Polska Organizacja Narodowa; PON) was a Polish political organisation formed by Józef Piłsudski after the split of Supreme National Committee (Naczelny Komitet Narodowy, NKN) on 5 September 1914. NKN, heavily influenced by the Austrian government, vied with more independent Piłsudski over the control of Polish armed forces. When ordered to limit recruitment to his Legions, Piłsudski disobeyed those orders and created the PON. Temporarily supported in this by the Germans, soon (after German military failure to capture Warsaw) Piłsudski was forced to subjugate PON to NKN.
