= Pontine =

Pontine may refer to:

- Having to do with the pons, a structure located in the brain stem (from pons, "bridge")
- Pontine Marshes, a region of Italy near Rome
- Pontine Islands, islands of Italy near Circeo
