= 565 (disambiguation) =

565 may refer to:

- 565 A.D.
- Interstate 565 - spur route of Interstate 65 in greater Huntsville, Alabama, United States
- J. S. Bach's Toccata and Fugue in D minor, BWV 565, a piece of organ music
