= Esquiline Treasure =

Roman silver hoard

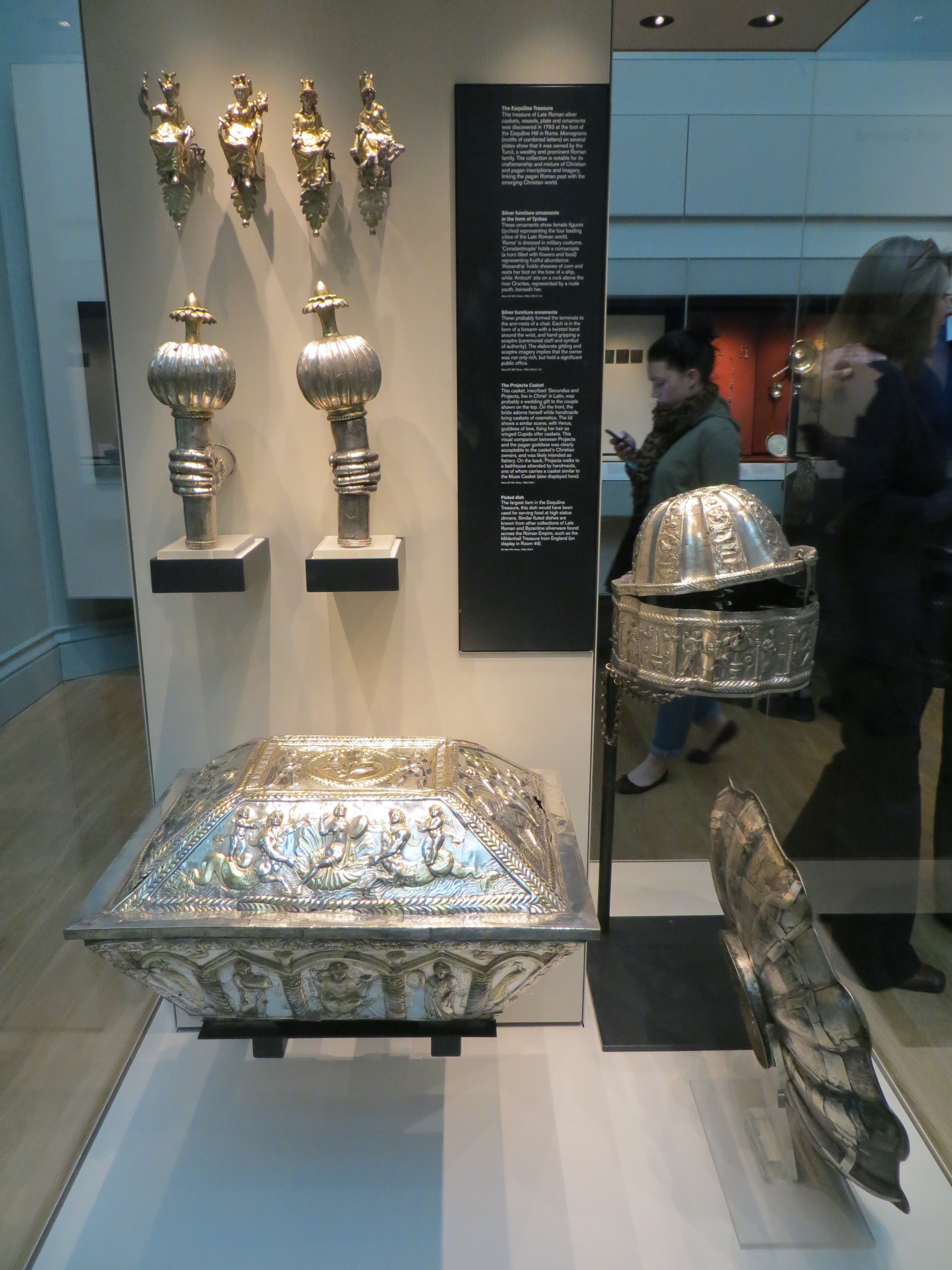
- Part of the Esquiline Treasure as currently displayed in the British Museum
- Material: Silver
- Created: 4th century AD
- Present location: British Museum, London

The Esquiline Treasure is an ancient Roman silver treasure that was found in 1793 on the Esquiline Hill in Rome. The hoard is considered an important example of late antique silver work from the 4th century AD, probably about 380 for the major pieces. Since 1866, 57 objects, representing the great majority of the treasure, have been in the British Museum.

Two of the most important objects in the treasure are the ornate silver-gilt engraved boxes known as the Projecta Casket and the Muse Casket. The treasure was part of the belongings of a wealthy Roman household of high social status, which can probably be identified. The collection includes 8 plates (4 circular and 4 rectangular), a fluted dish, a ewer inscribed for "Pelegrina", a flask with embossed scenes, an amphora, 6 sets of horse trappings, with furniture fittings including 4 Tyche figures representing the 4 main cities of the Roman Empire: Rome, Constantinople, Antioch and Alexandria, two hands clenching bannisters, and an assortment of jewellery.

Although a number of large late Roman hoards have been discovered, most are from the fringes of the empire (such as Roman Britain), and very few objects from the period can be presumed to have been made by silversmiths in Rome itself, giving the Esquiline Treasure a "special significance". This major hoard is displayed in room 41 of the British Museum alongside the Carthage Treasure and near the British finds of the Mildenhall Treasure, Hoxne Hoard, Water Newton Treasure and the Corbridge Lanx. It has been observed that the majority of the major surviving late Roman silver hoards are in the British Museum.

== Discovery of the treasure ==
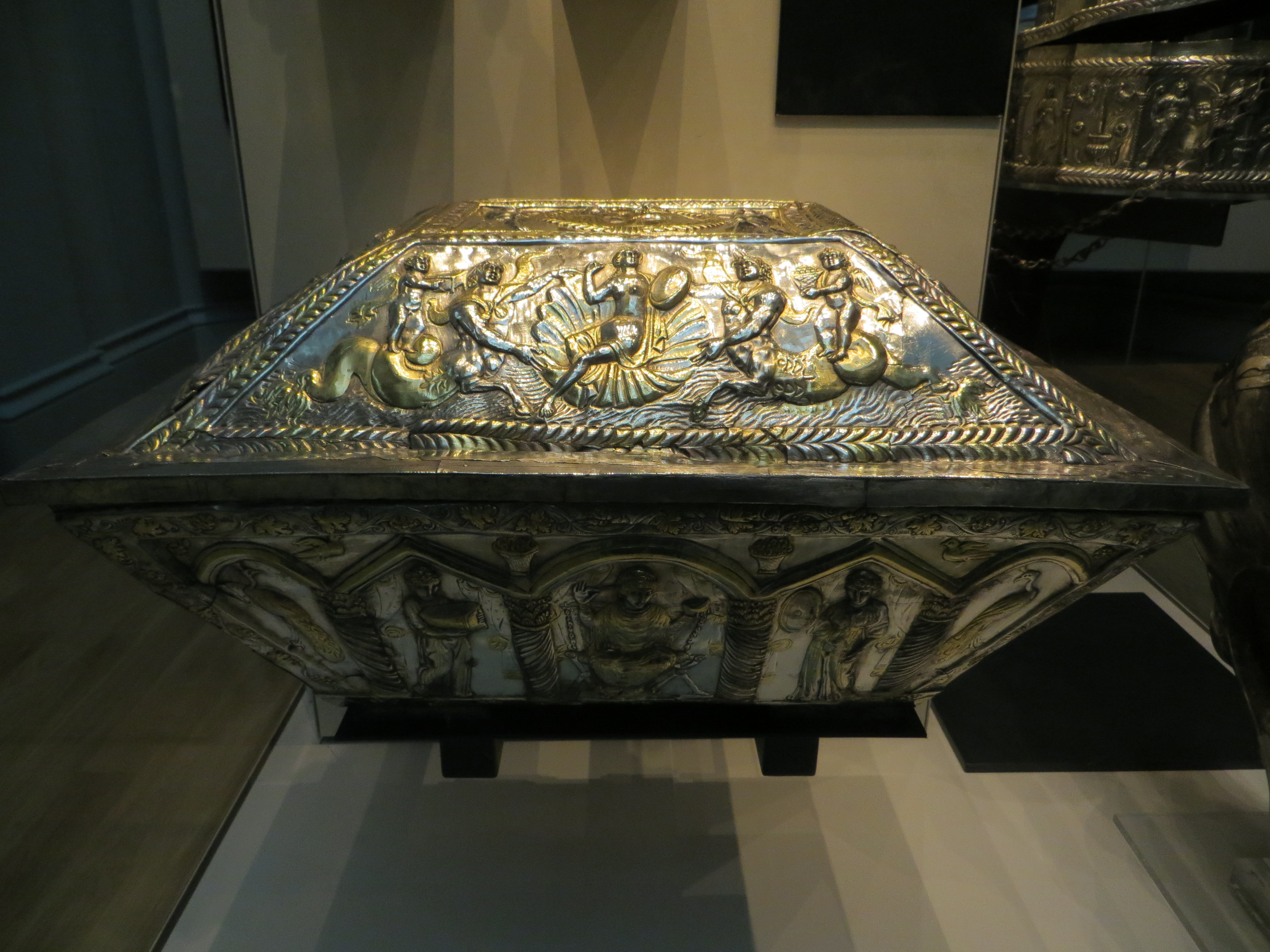
Lid of the Projecta Casket

In the summer of 1793 workers encountered a large collection of silver objects during excavation work at the foot of the Esquiline Hill in Rome, which had been the area favoured by the Roman aristocracy for their houses throughout the Roman period. These items were found in the ruins of a Roman building, which was at that time in the premises of the monastery of San Francesco di Paola in Rome. The first official record of the finds was made one year after their discovery by the famous Italian classical archaeologist and later head of the Capitoline Museum Ennio Quirino Visconti.

The treasure passed through many hands before eventually being acquired by the French collector and one-time ambassador to Rome the Duc de Blacas. In 1866 his collection was sold in its entirety to the British Museum. However, two other items in the treasure can be found in the Musee du Petit Palais in Paris (a highly decorated trulla or saucepan), and the Museo Nazionale in Naples (a jug in the form of a woman's head).

== The Tyches ==
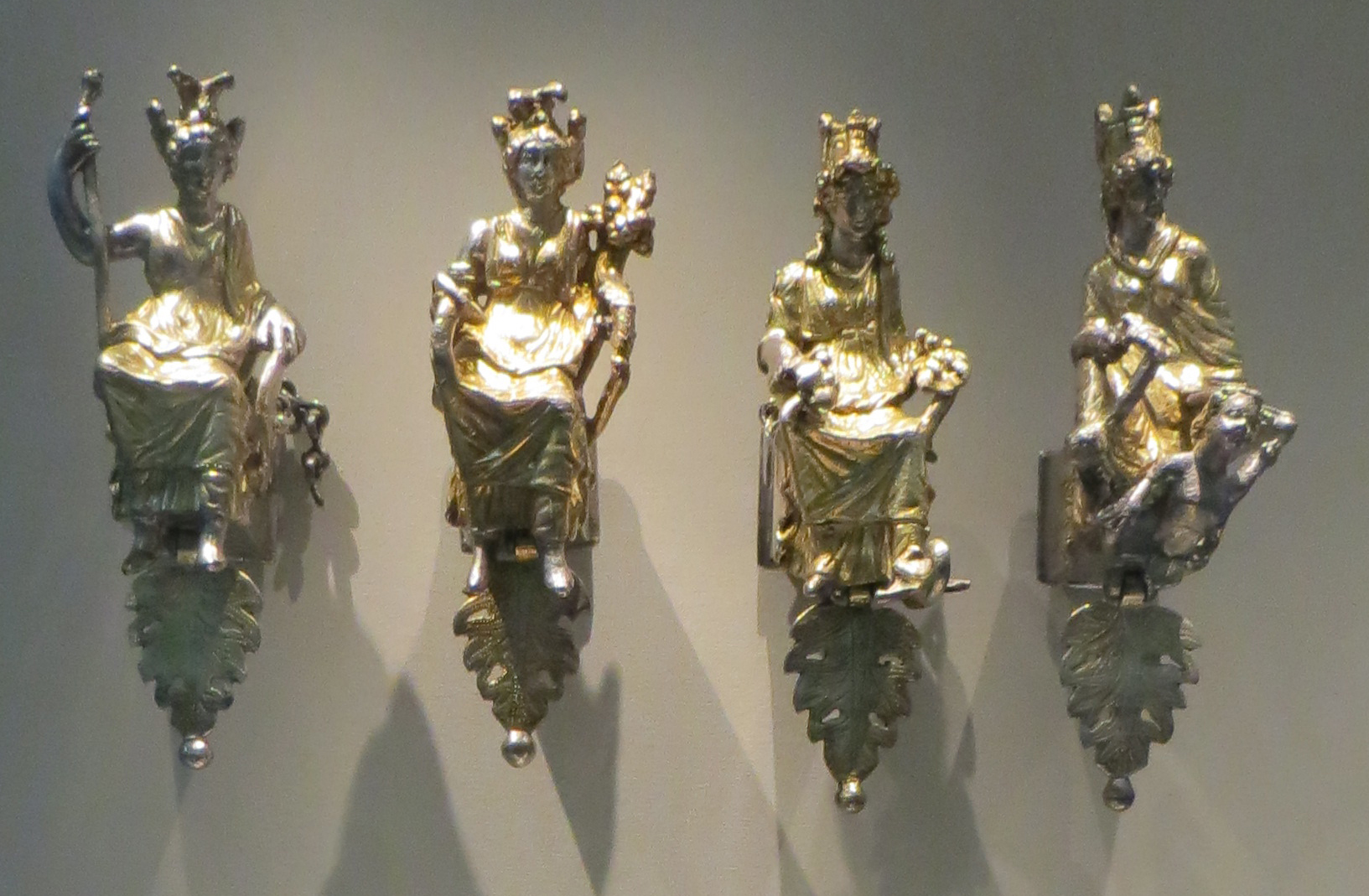
Tyches of Rome, Constantinople, Alexandria, and Antioch

The four silver Tyches (which were iconic versions of a presiding tutelary deity of Classical Greek mythology governing the fortune and prosperity of a city, its destiny) are represented with different attributes: military attire for the Tyche of Rome, a cornucopia for the one of Constantinople, sheaves of corns and the bow of a ship for the Tyche of Alexandria, and a male swimmer personifying the Orontes River at the feet of the Tyche of Antioch.

== The Projecta Casket ==
The so-called Projecta Casket (M&ME 1866,12–29,1) is one of the most famous and magnificent examples of silver craftsmanship from late antiquity in Rome. It is partially gilded to highlight some areas, and was made by the repoussé technique – that is the ornamented relief was achieved by means of pressing or pushing back the metal surface. The box is 55.9 cm long, 28.6 cm high and 43.2 cm wide and has a weight of 8.2 kg. The base of the box has swinging handles at each end.

The five panels on the lid of the box represent three mythological scenes, a double portrait and a bathing scene. On the top panel of the lid are half-length figures of a man and woman within a wreath held by standing erotes (or putti in modern terms) and an inscription which reads: "SECVNDE ET PROIECTA VIVATIS IN CHRI[STO] ('Secundus and Projecta, may you live in Christ'). The attire of the two figures is clearly that of an affluent couple from late antiquity. The woman is wearing a long-sleeved tunic with a large necklace. In her hands she holds a papyrus roll. The man is in a long-sleeved tunic that he wears under a chlamys.

The four panels of the box itself depict bathing and dressing scenes, representing the preparations for a grand Roman wedding. These are placed between columns joined by alternating arches and bottomless pediments, all under a frieze with scrolling vines. In one scene, Projecta is shown sitting on an ornate chair holding a decorated box similar in shape to the Muse Casket. She wears a long-sleeved tunic under a colobium or short-sleeved tunic. A smaller inscription on the front rim of the lid gives the weight as "XXII-III", meaning "[Pondo] XXII,III [Unciae],S[emuncia]" or "Twenty-two pounds, three and one-half ounces" in Roman units.

The casket has travelled abroad to several international exhibitions: New York in 1977–1978, Rimini in 1996, New Delhi in 1997, Mumbai in 1998, Trier in 2007, Paris in 2009 and most recently Chicago in 2012–13.

== The Muse Casket ==
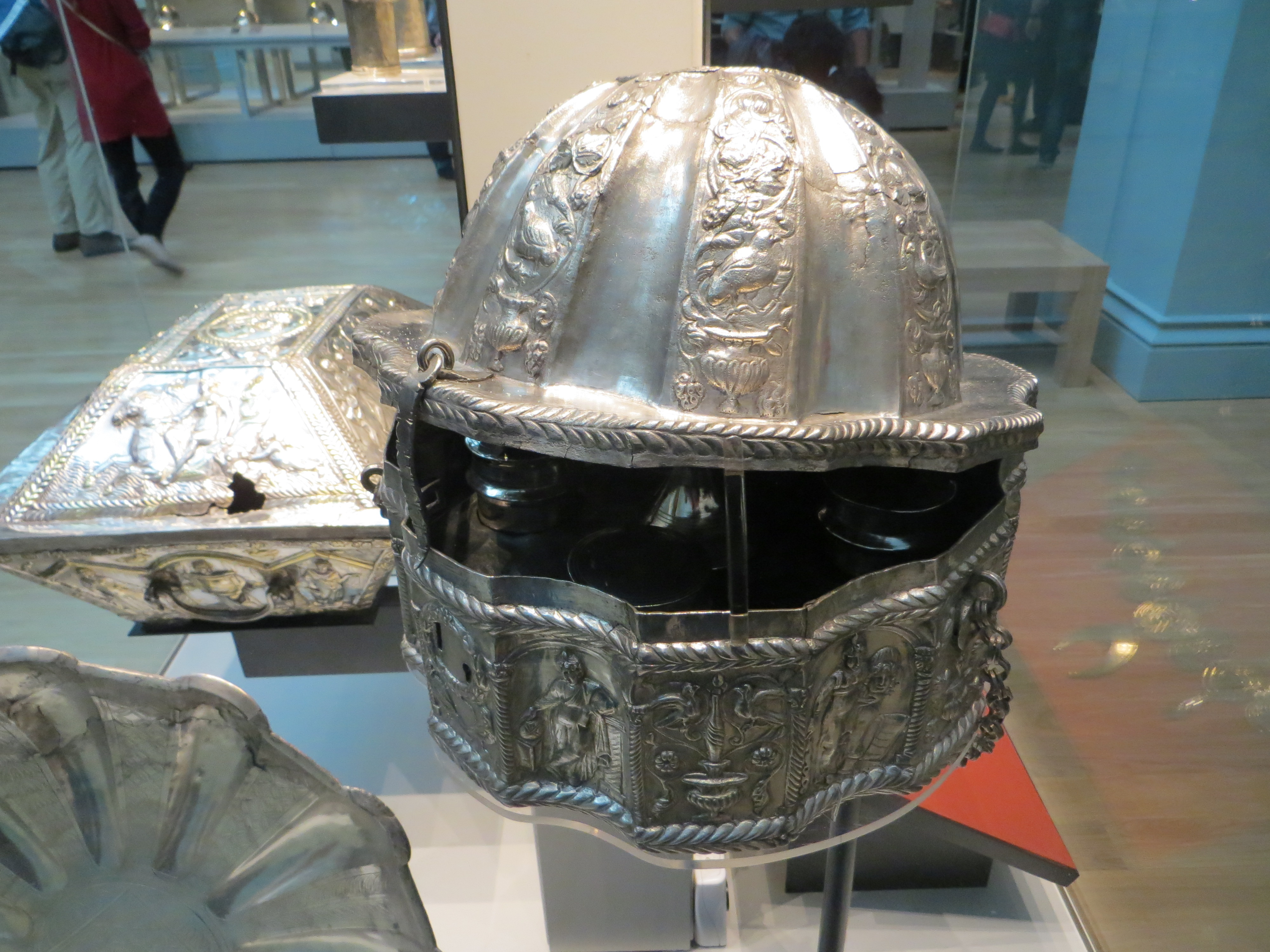
The "Muse Casket"

Another ornate object in the treasure is the Muse Casket (M&ME 1866,12–29,2), which is a domed silver box, suspended on three chains. It is 25.4 cm high and 33 cm across. The outside of the box is decorated with relief panels showing eight of the Nine Muses alternating with decorative motifs. Inside the casket were found a set of five silver lidded bottles, or "four identical silver canisters and one silver flask" in the centre. These were presumably to hold perfumed oils for toiletries. An apparently identical casket is carried by a female servant on the back panel of the Projecta Casket, suggesting that both were commissioned for the same wedding.

This casket is also well-travelled, exhibited in New York in 1977–1978, Rome in 2000, Milan in 2003, Paris in 2009 and most recently Chicago in 2012–13.

== Projecta and the Turcii ==
The British Museum follows Kathleen J. Shelton in dating the treasure as a whole to the period 330–370; Shelton favours a period of some 20 to 25 years within that range, with the major objects from the same workshop, and probably for more than one generation within a family. Current research suggests that the Projecta Casket and some other items in the treasure (but probably not all of them) were a wedding gift to the newly married couple Projecta and Secundus. Projecta has been associated with an epitaph for a woman of that name who died in 383, shortly before her 17th birthday, written by Pope Damasus I (r. 366-84) that was once displayed in the church of San Martino ai Monti, close to where the find was made. Though only nine lines long, and described by Alan Cameron as "typically lame and frigid" (for a composition by Damasus) and "a tissue of tags and clichés shakily strung together and barely squeezed into the meter", the epitaph creates a number of puzzles and has generated much scholarly discussion. The epitaph reads:

QVID LOQVAR AVT SILEAM PROHIBET DOLOR IPSE FATERI | HIC TVMVLVS LACRIMAS RETINET COGNOSCE PARENTVM | PROIECTAE FVERAT PRIMO QVAE IVNCTA MARITO | PVLCRA DECORE SVO SOLO CONTENTA PVDORE | HEV DILECTA SATIS MISERAE GENITRICIS AMORE | ACCIPE QVID MVLTIS THALAMI POST FOEDERA PRIMA | EREPTA EX OCVLIS FLORI GENITORIS ABIIT | AETHERIAM CVPIENS COELI CONSCENDERE LVCEM | HAEC DAMASVS PRAESTAT CVNCTIS SOLACIA FLETVS | VIXIT ANN·XVI·M·IX·DIES·XXV·DEP·III·KAL·IAN·FL·MEROBAVDE·ET·FL·SATVRNIN·CONSS.

What? should I speak, or be silent? Grief itself prevents speaking out. Thus tomb holds the tears (learn, [reader,]) of the parents of Projecta, who had been the wife of Primus, beautiful in her elegance,content with modesty alone; cherished (ah!) by the love of her [now] most wretched mother. Understand, [reader,]—in few words—(that) soon after the marriage, snatched from the sight of Florus, her father, she departed, seeking to rise to the ethereal light of heaven. These (lines) Damasus offers to all as a relief for tears. She lived 16 yrs., 9 mos., 25 days, (and) was buried Dec. 30, in the consulship of Flavius Merobaudes and Flavius Saturninus.

— Arthur Ernest Gordon, Illustrated Introduction to Latin Epigraphy (1983) p. 177

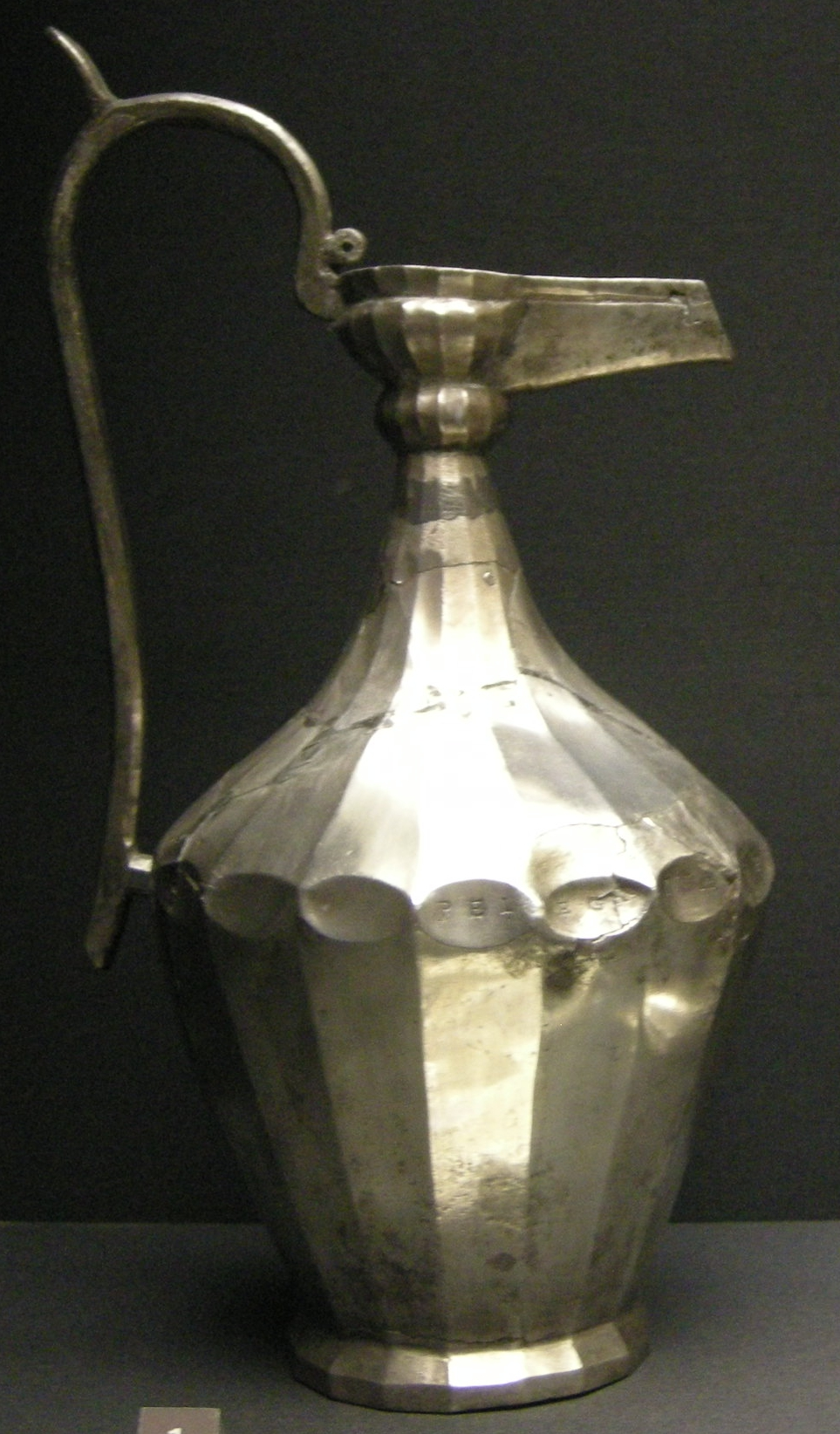
The Pelegrina Ewer; her name can be seen at the widest point, across the three "dimples" to the right

The translation here of "PROIECTAE FVERAT PRIMO QVAE IVNCTA MARITO" as "Projecta, who had been the wife of Primus" continues to be hotly discussed; primus, meaning "first" was a Roman male name, but other possibilities are that Projecta had a "first" husband, or that her unnamed husband was primus or "first" in the complementary sense of being "the tops". Alan Cameron, who supports the Projecta of the epitaph being the wife of L. Turcius Secundus and the owner of the casket, sees primo as punning wordplay by Damasus – "second" was actually "first" in quality; he says this would be typical of Damasus's style. Kathleen Shelton disagrees, seeing no connection between two different women called Projecta, one of the epitaph and the other of the casket, and supporting "Primus" as the name of the husband in the epitaph.

The epitaph for Projecta gives her father's name as Florus, who may be the important and pious Iberian official of that name who was close to Theodosius I (himself Iberian), and given great appointments at just this period. He was part of a coterie of Iberian Christians close to the emperor, most seemingly related, which included Pope Damasus. Florus may be the figure of that name depicted with Damasus and a Simon and Peter in a gold glass cup in the Vatican Museums and in another with Simon (Simon appears in a further glass with Damasus), suggesting "a circle of friends, or at least associates".

Two pieces of silver plate, a rectangular dish and a circular one were inscribed with a monogram that has been translated as standing for Projecta Turci. Based on this evidence, some scholars have suggested that Projecta was married to L. Turcius Secundus, and given her age this must have been not long before 383. However, not all the monograms seem to relate to this couple, and it may well be that the treasure represented the family silver accumulated over more than one generation. A ewer in the treasure is inscribed with the female name Pelegrina, but her identity has not been the subject of equal speculation, as there is no other evidence to go on. Another couple of a Turcius and Pelegrina has been tentatively suggested, though how their dates would relate to Projecta and Secundus is unclear.

While Projecta was evidently Christian, her husband, if he was L. Turcius Secundus, was a member of a prominent family many of whom remained pagans until the end of the century. The ivory Symmachi–Nicomachi diptych from the same period and milieu in Rome shows pagan iconography; some 70 years after the conversion of Constantine the old religion still had supporters in the Roman elite. The four Tyches of the main cities of the empire suggest they were made for the posts of a great official's chair or litter; members of the Turcii held several such positions. Cameron claims that the helmet of Constantinople is a form not found on Tyche figures of that city before 380, when the see of Constantinople was suddenly raised to be second to Rome, above older ones such as Alexandria.

It has been suggested that the treasure was buried at the Turcii house on the Esquiline Hill just before the Visigothic attack on Rome by Alaric I in 410 AD.

== Christian/pagan iconography ==
In spite of the Christian inscription on the Projecta Casket, the iconography of the figurative decoration of the treasure is purely pagan, a common mixture in Roman metalwork from the period to about 350, when Early Christian art had not yet devised iconography for essentially secular decoration. Three sides of the Projecta Casket's lid are decorated with pagan mythological motifs – these include the deity Venus on a cockleshell, nereids (sea-nymphs) riding a ketos (a dragon-like sea monster) and a hippocamp (a monster with the front quarters of a horse and the tail of a fish). The mixture of Christian and pagan inscriptions and symbols may have been a compromise reflecting the affiliations of the bride and groom's families, described in the previous section.

== Gallery ==
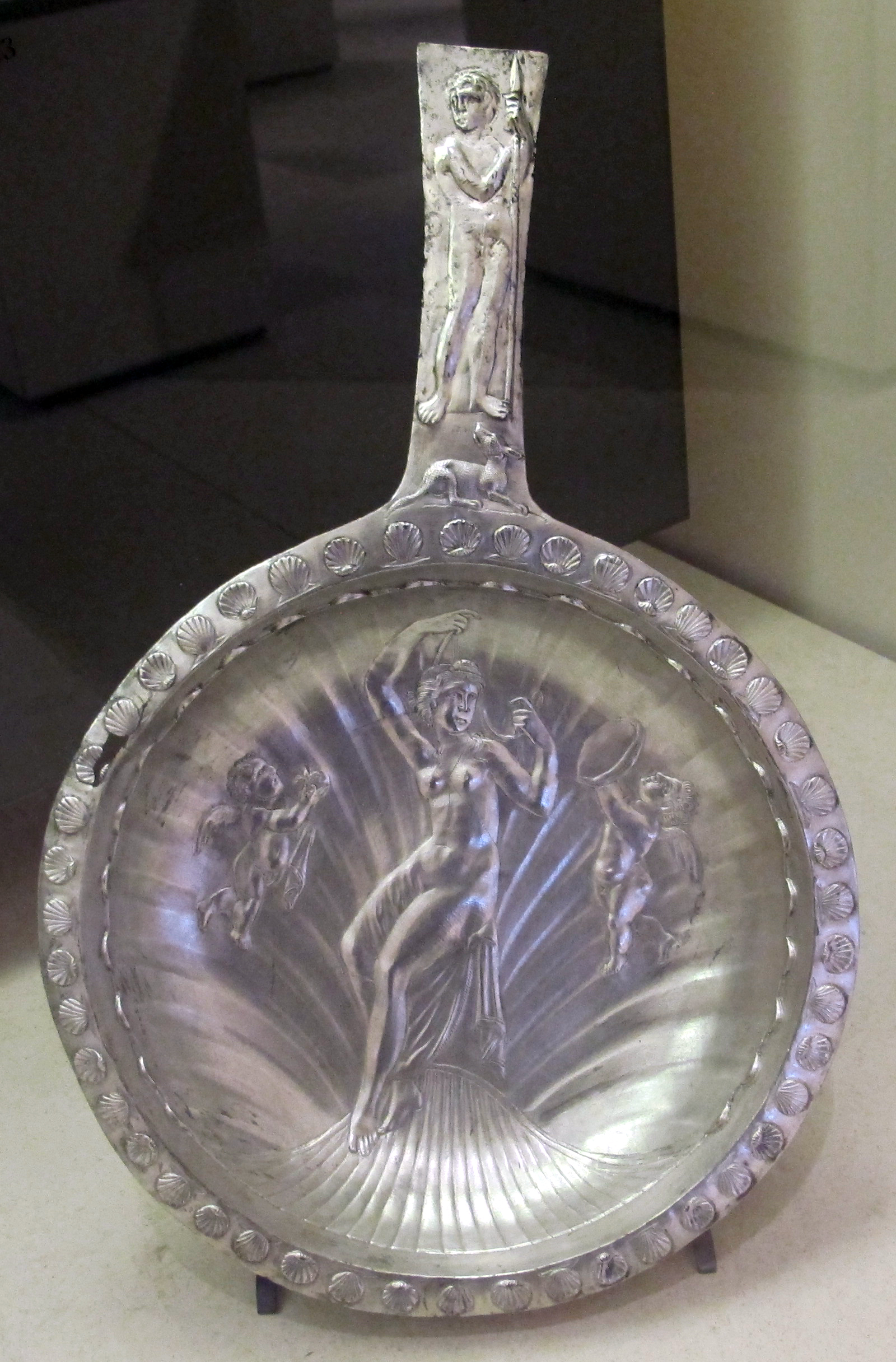
The trulla in Paris, one of two objects from the treasure not in the British Museum

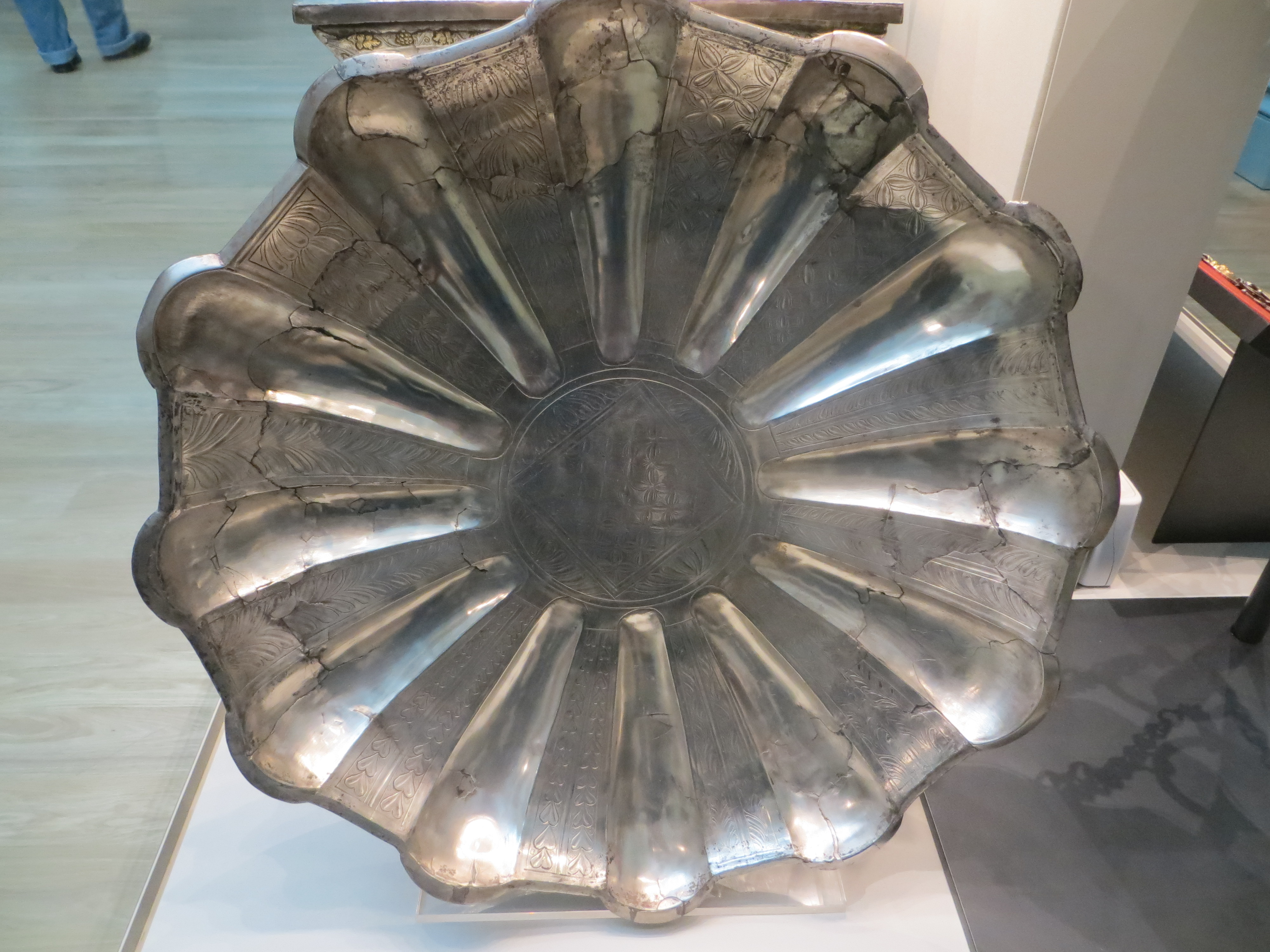
Silver fluted bowl from the treasure

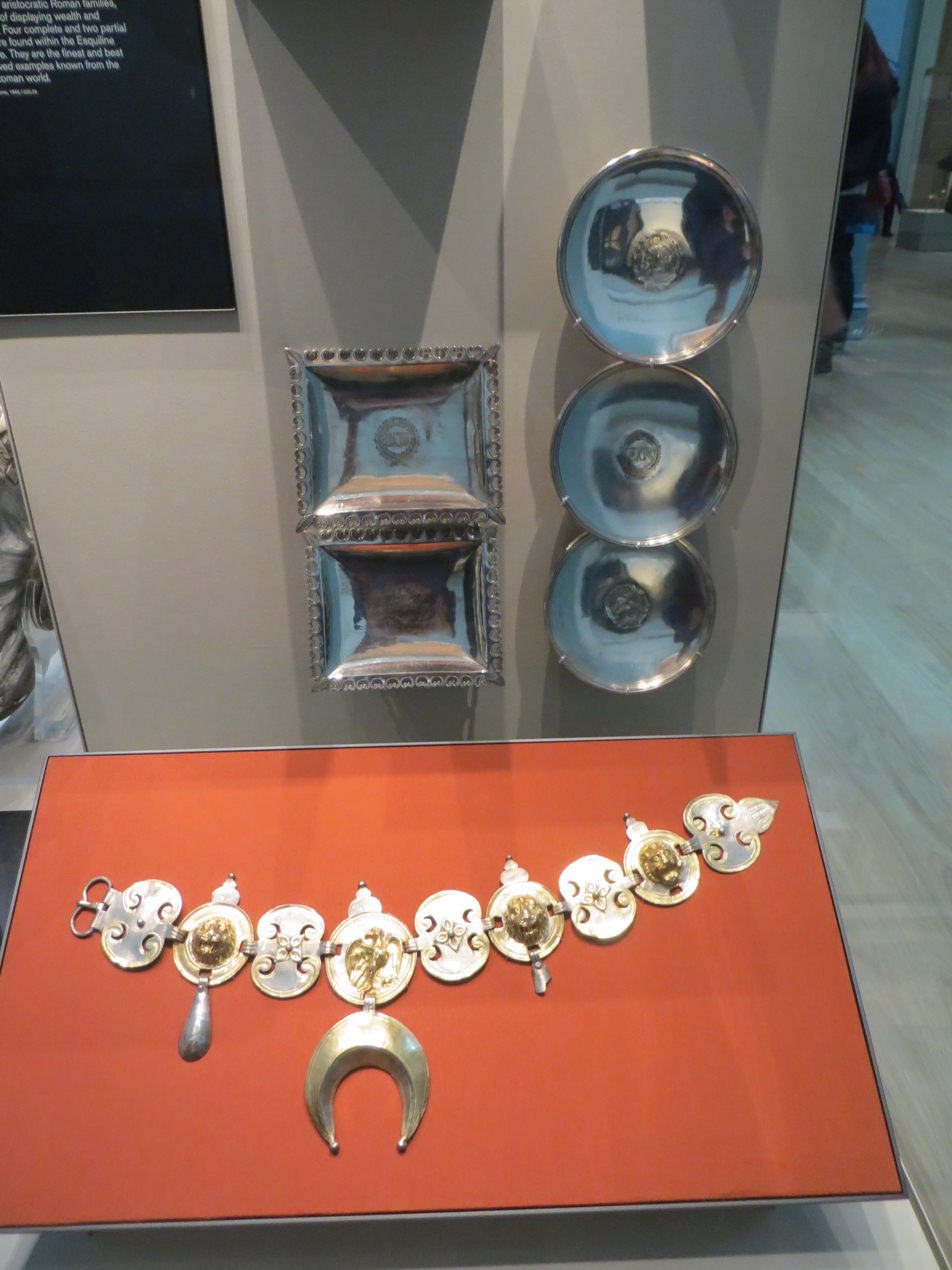
Rectangular and circular silver plates and equestrian furnishings

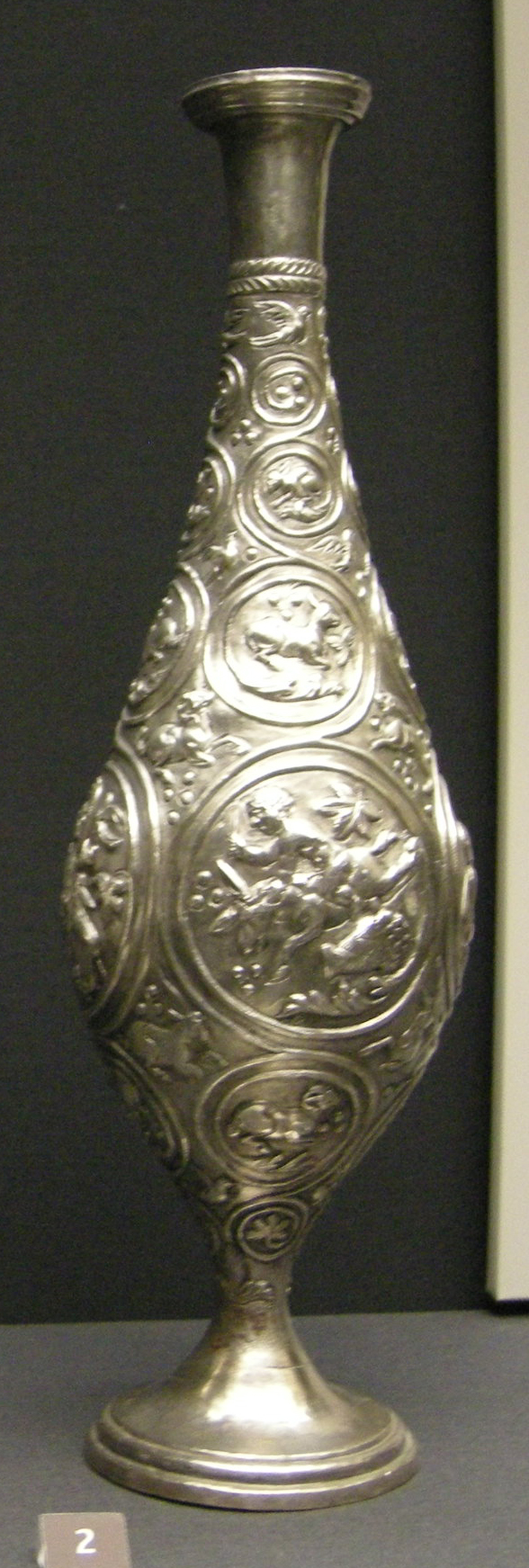
Flask from the treasure

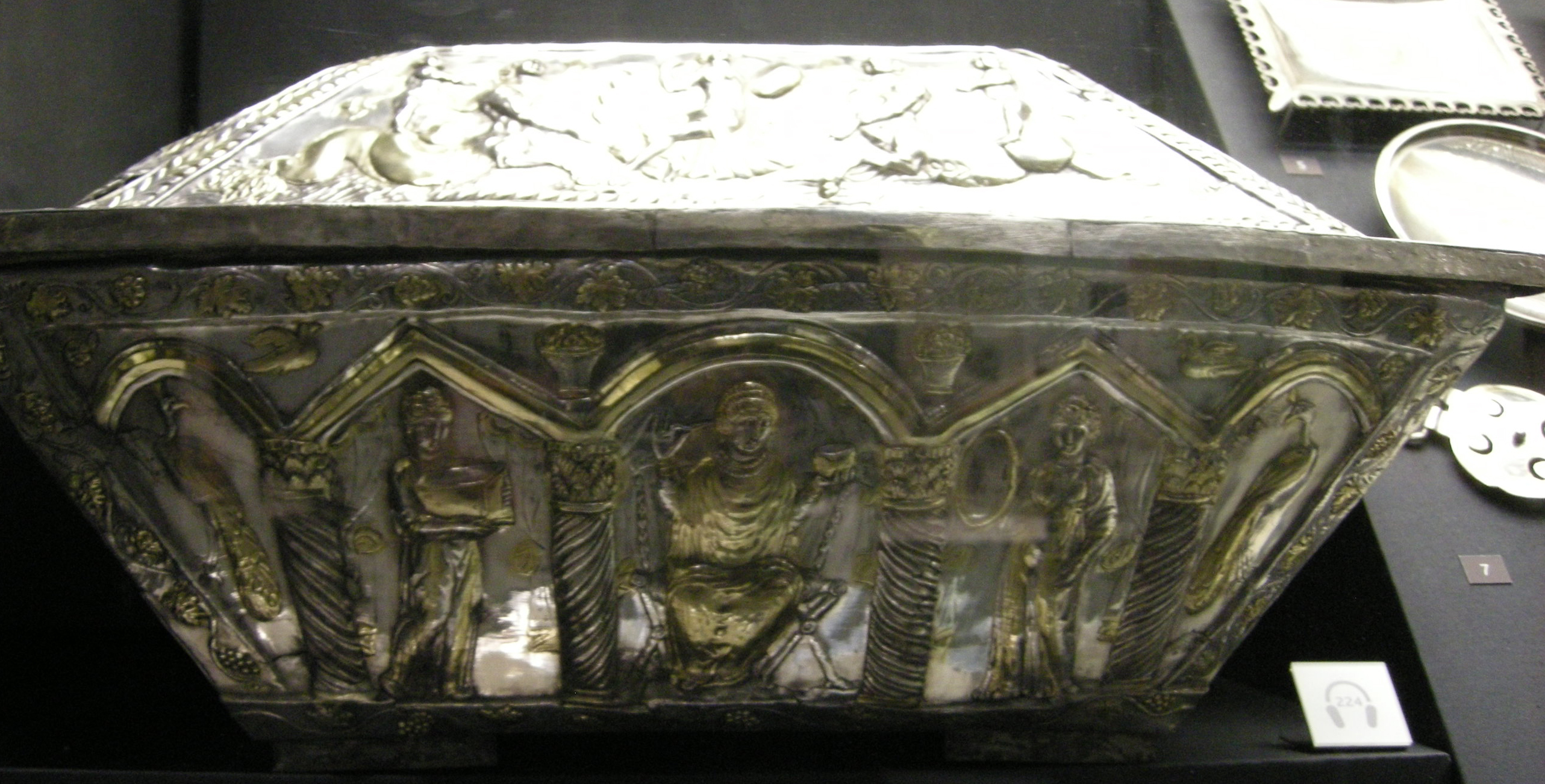
Side of the Projecta Casket

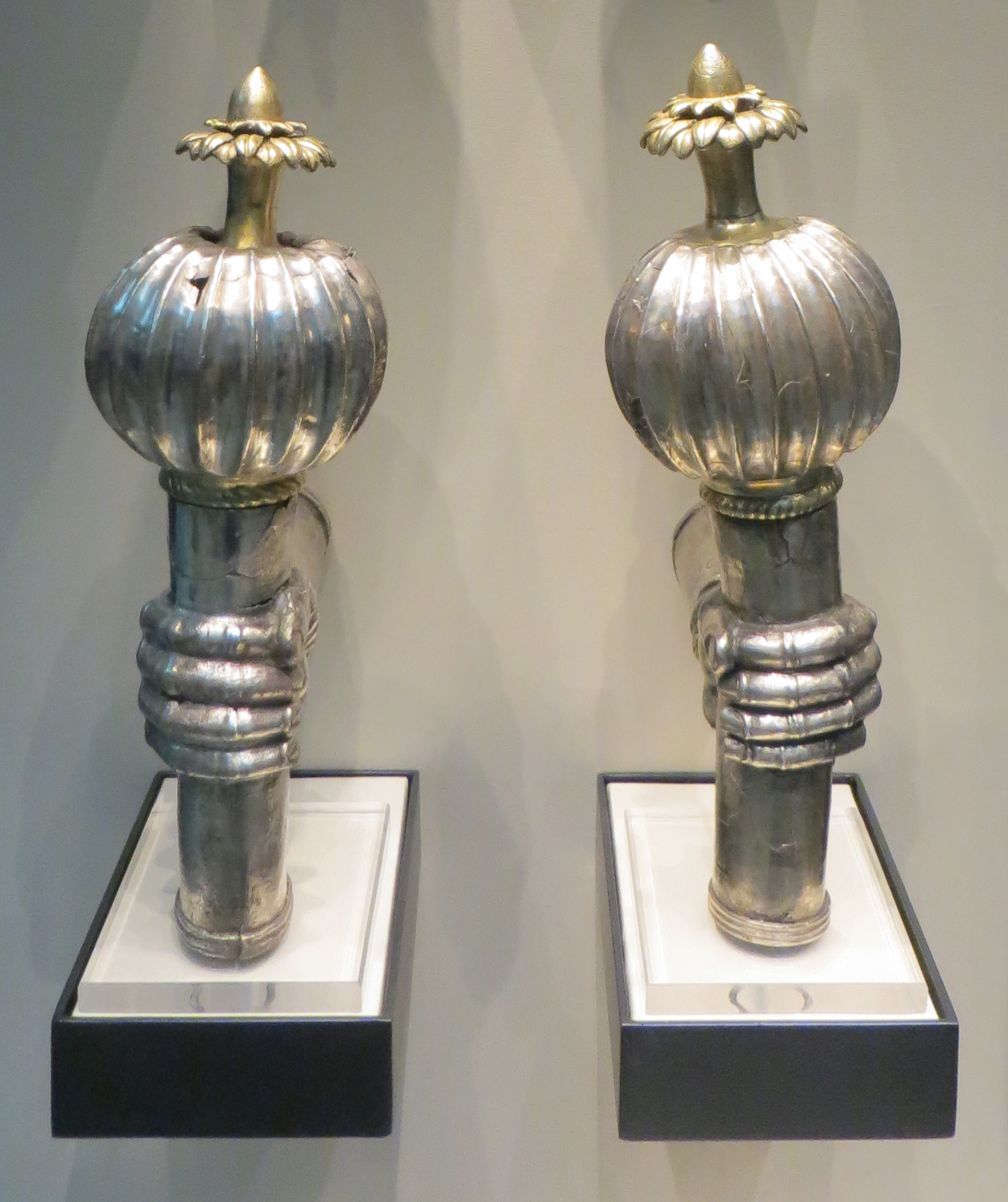
Furniture fittings

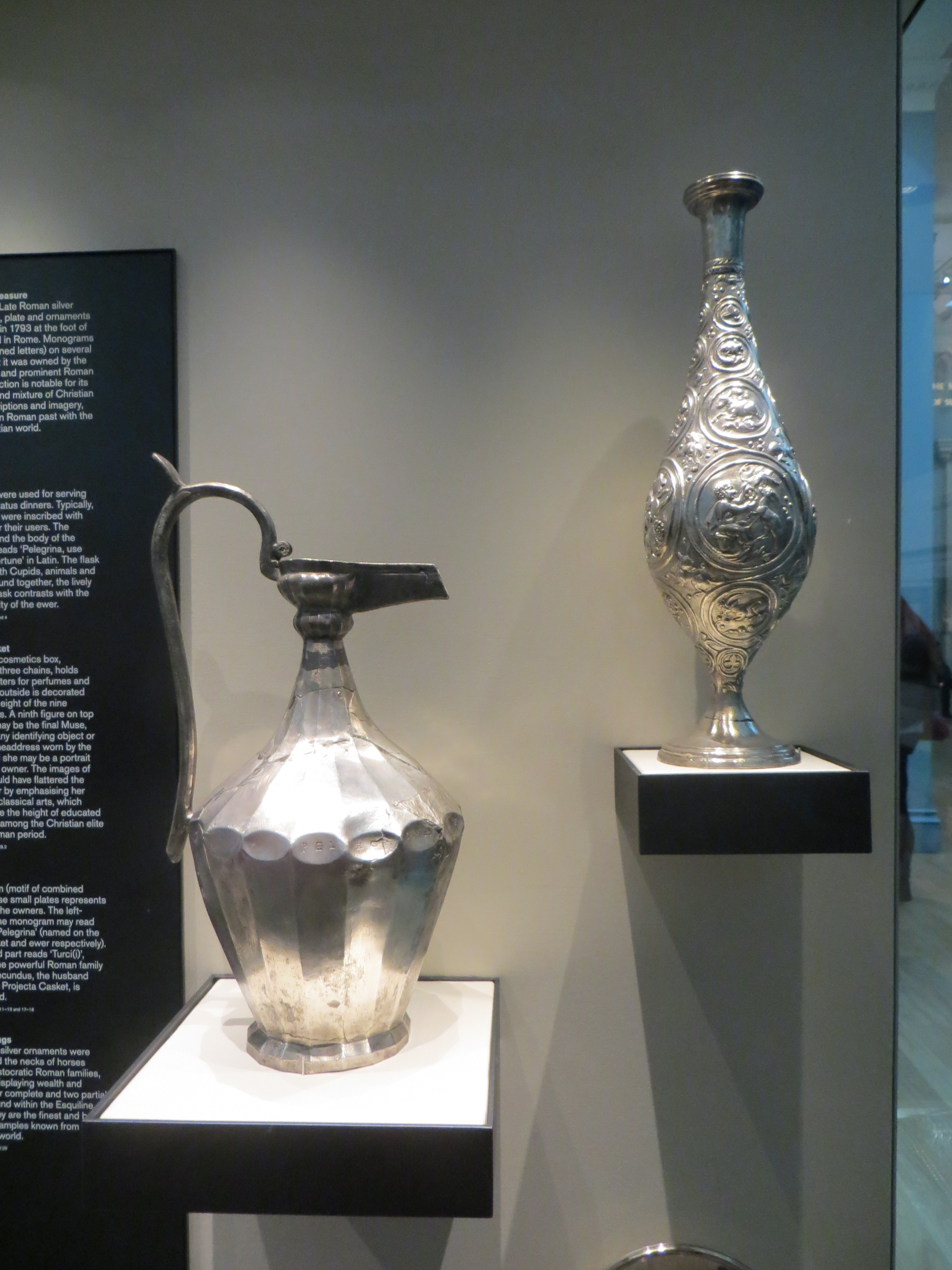
Flask and vase from the treasure
