= Tyche =

Greek goddess of fortune

- Goddess of Fortune
- Member of the Oceanids
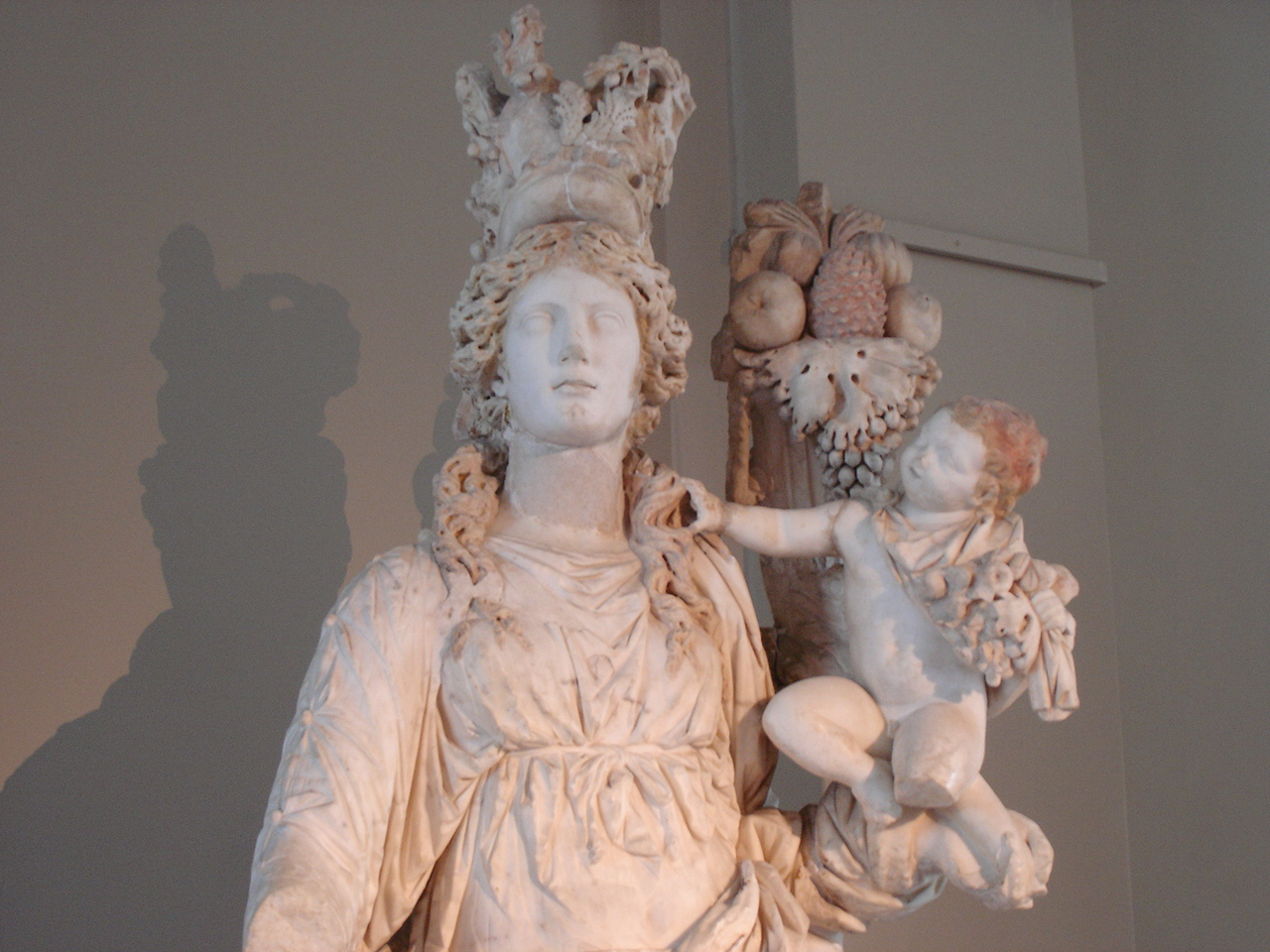
- Polychrome marble statue depicting Tyche holding the infant Plutus in her arms, 2nd century AD, Istanbul Archaeological Museum
- Symbol: Mural crown

Genealogy
- Parents: Oceanus and Tethys or Zeus and Aphrodite or Prometheus
- Siblings: Oceanids, the river gods
- Children: Plutus

Equivalents
- Roman: Fortuna

Tyche (/ˈtaɪki/; Ancient Greek: Τύχη Túkhē, 'Luck', Ancient Greek: [tý.kʰɛː], Modern Greek: [ˈti.çi]; Roman equivalent: Fortuna) was the presiding tutelary deity who governed the fortune and prosperity of a city, its destiny. In Classical Greek mythology, she is the daughter of the Titans Tethys and Oceanus, and she brings positive messages to people relating to external events outside their control.

During the Hellenistic period, with dramatic socio-political changes starting with Alexander the Great, Tyche increasingly embodied the whims of fate (both negative and positive), eclipsing the role of the Olympic gods. The Greek historian Polybius believed that when no cause can be discovered to events such as floods, droughts, frosts, or even in politics, then the cause of these events may be fairly attributed to Tyche. Other ancient Greek sources corroborate Polybius, such as Pindar who claims Tyche could hand victory to a lesser athlete. This "Hellenistic Tyche" is often featured on coins such as those minted by Demetrius I Soter. Further, Tyche comes to represent not only personal fate, but the fate of communities. Cities venerated their own Tychai, specific iconic versions of the original Tyche. This practice was continued in the iconography of Roman art, even into the Christian period, often as sets of the greatest cities of the empire.

Tyche was further absorbed into the Parthian Empire, who frequently depicted Tyche in their coins, as well as in imagery bestowing legitimacy to Parthian kings.

Automatia (/ˌɔːtəˈmeɪʃə/; Greek: Αὐτοματία Automatíā, 'she who does what she will') was an epithet of Tyche.

== Mythology ==
=== Family ===
In literature, Tyche might be given various genealogies. She has been described as a daughter of Oceanus and Tethys, thus one of the Oceanids, or of Zeus, or even Prometheus. She was connected with Nemesis and Agathos Daimon ("good spirit").

She is sometimes named as the mother of Plutus, the god of wealth; usually, however, he is the son of Demeter and Iasion.

=== Hero myths ===
According to Pausanias in his Description of Greece, Palamedes created the first pair of dice and gave them as an offering to Tyche.

== Worship ==
Tyche was uniquely venerated at Itanos in Crete, as Tyche Protogeneia, linked with the Athenian Protogeneia ("firstborn"), daughter of Erechtheus, whose self-sacrifice saved the city. In Alexandria the Tychaeon, the Greek temple of Tyche, was described by Libanius as one of the most magnificent of the entire Hellenistic world.

Stylianos Spyridacis concisely expressed Tyche's appeal in a Hellenistic world of arbitrary violence and unmeaning reverses: "In the turbulent years of the Epigoni of Alexander, an awareness of the instability of human affairs led people to believe that Tyche, the blind mistress of Fortune, governed mankind with an inconstancy which explained the vicissitudes of the time."

According to Matheson, the Goddess Tyche was often worshipped as the personification of a city and its fortune. Matheson also states that there were cults to Tyche all over the Mediterranean. In Athens for instance, citizens would give tribute to Agathe Tyche alongside other gods. Other gods seem to also be presented alongside Tyche including Dionysus at Corinth.

There was a Temple of Tyche that contained a figure called Nemesis-Tyche, an aspect of Tyche. According to Edwards, Nemesis and Tyche begin to share cults in the Roman period.

The mural crown of Tyche of Sparta depicts the Spartans soldiers repelling Amazons. Palagia argues that this depiction is important to Spartan mythology.

== Depictions ==
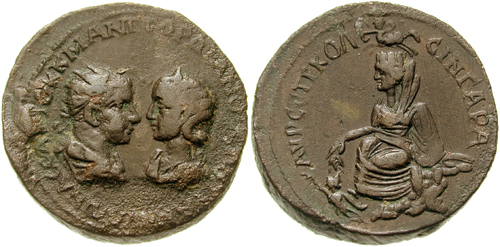
Tyche on the reverse of this base metal coin by Gordian III (r. 238 – 244 AD)

Tyche appears on many coins of the Hellenistic period in the three centuries before the Christian era, especially from cities in the Aegean. Unpredictable turns of fortune drive the complicated plotlines of Hellenistic romances, such as, Leucippe and Clitophon or Daphnis and Chloe. She experienced a resurgence in another era of uneasy change, the final days of publicly sanctioned Paganism, between the late-fourth-century emperors Julian and Theodosius I, who definitively closed the temples. The effectiveness of her capricious power even achieved respectability in philosophical circles during that generation, although among poets it was a commonplace to revile her for a fickle harlot.

The constellation of Virgo is sometimes identified as the heavenly figure of Tyche, as well as other goddesses such as Demeter, Dike and Astraea.

=== Tyche in art ===
In Greco-Roman and medieval art, Tyche was depicted as wearing a mural crown, and carrying a cornucopia (horn of plenty), an emblematic gubernaculum (ship's rudder), and the wheel of fortune, or she may stand on the wheel, presiding over the entire circle of fate.

The mural crown's significance is that it identifies her as the goddess of the city, and in the case of Sparta her mural crown depicted a part of their foundation myth of their city. The mural crown is often used by archeologists and historians to identify a figure in art as Tyche.

According to Matheson, the Goddess Tyche, being one of the Oceanids, is considered to be an ocean goddess of some kind. Citing how Pindar refers to her in his poems, "he implores her to keep watch around Himera, a port" and how she is often depicted holding a ship's rudder.

=== Tyche in theatre ===
The play writer Euripides used Tyche as a literary device and personification. Apollo is said to direct Tyche and even the god's plans can be influenced by the concept of Tyche.

=== Tyche in poetry ===
The poet Pindar alludes to Tyche as a goddess of fate who can control the outcome of athletic contests, according to Giannopoulou.

== Greco-Roman Tyche ==
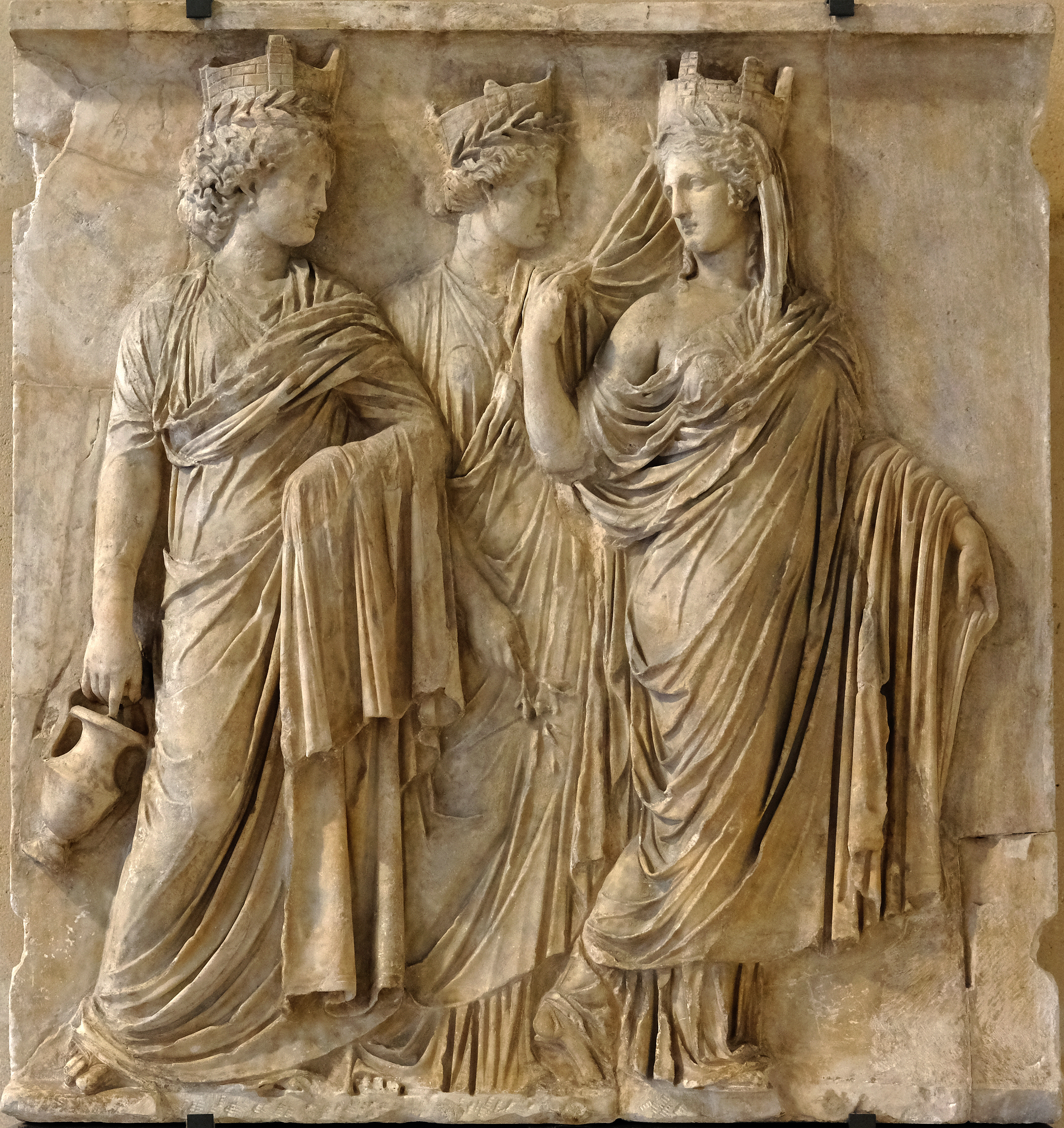
The Three Tychai, c. 160 AD, Louvre Museum

In late Roman sets the figures, usually four, represented the Tychai of Rome, Constantinople, Alexandria, and either Antioch (more usual, as in the Esquiline Treasure of about 380 AD) or Trier, as in the Calendar of 354. The Tychai may be seen wearing a mural crown (a crown like the walls of the city).

Another common depiction of Tyche in the Greco-Roman period was Nemesis-Tyche.

=== Tyche of Rome ===
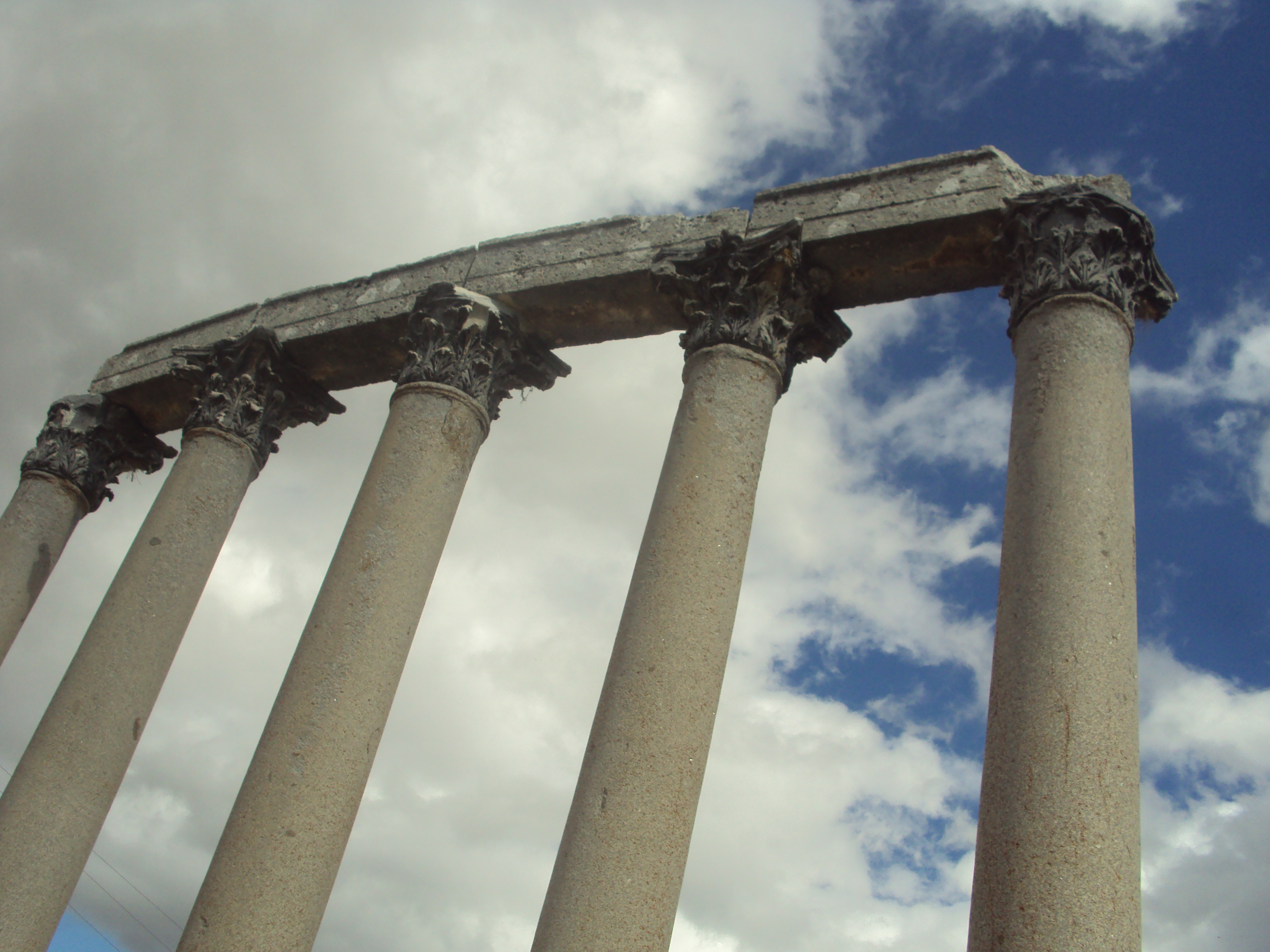
The remains of a Greek temple of Tyche, Olba

The Tyche of Rome was represented "in military costume" according to Amin. In Rome and the other parts of the Western Roman Empire she was referred to as Fortuna.

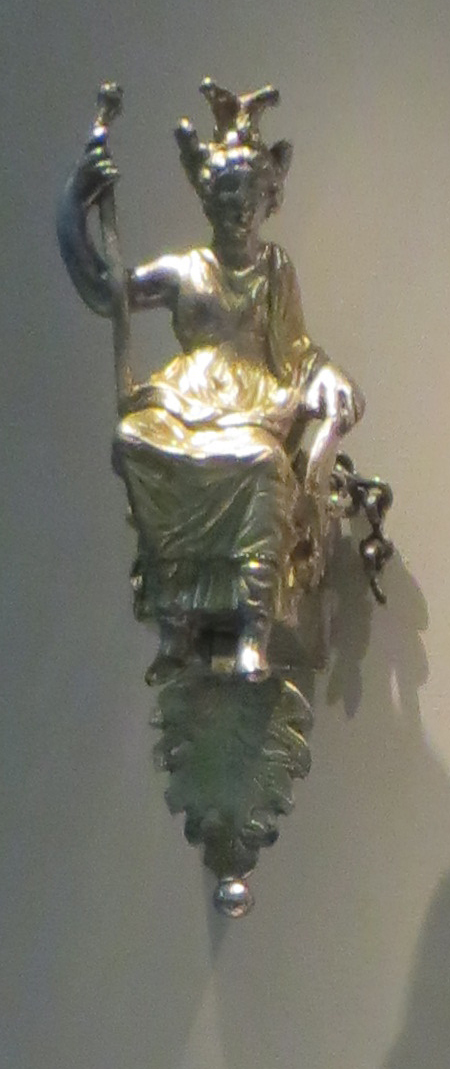
Tyche from the Esquiline Treasure

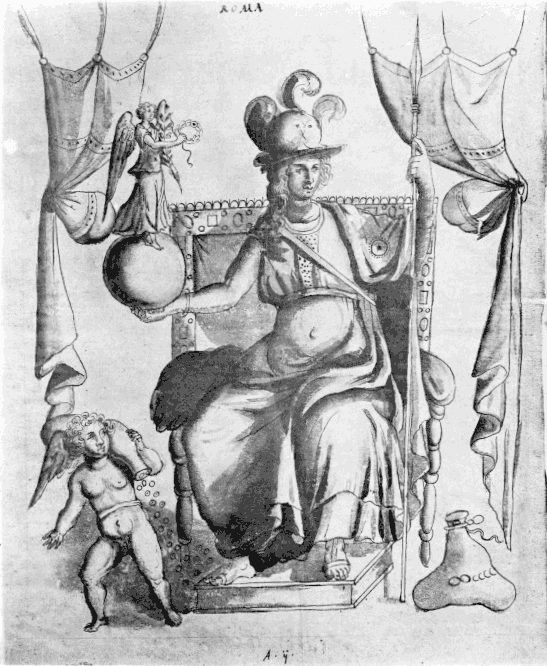
Tyche of the city of Rome - Chronography of 354, unknown author.

=== Tyche of Constantinople ===
Amin mentions that the attributes of the Tyche of Constantinople included a cornucopia. Tyche was still a figure in Constantinople, depicted on coins well into early Christian Rome. Matheson argues that the Tyche of Constantinople replaced the one of Antioch as the typical representation.

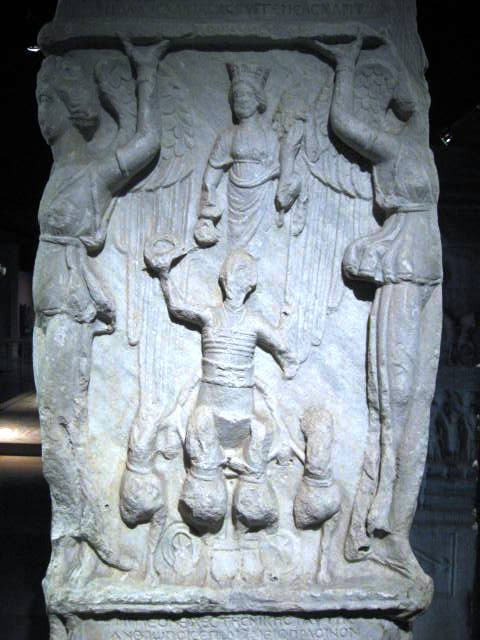
Base of statue that depicts Tyche holding a cornucopia. Found in Constantinople.

=== Tyche of Alexandria ===
The Tyche of Alexandria "hold sheaves of corns and rests her foot on the bow of a ship" as described by Amin. This could be related to how other depictions of Tyche, like the one in Sparta, are seen with ships rudders. This is because she can steer events argues Matheson. Also, Pindar describes her power over ships "At thy bidding, swift ships are steered upon the sea.

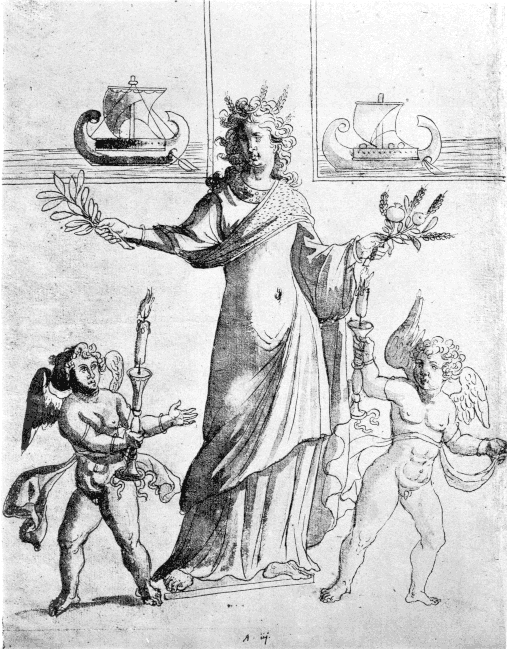
Tyche of the city of Alexandria - Chronography of 354, unknown author.

=== Tyche of Antioch ===
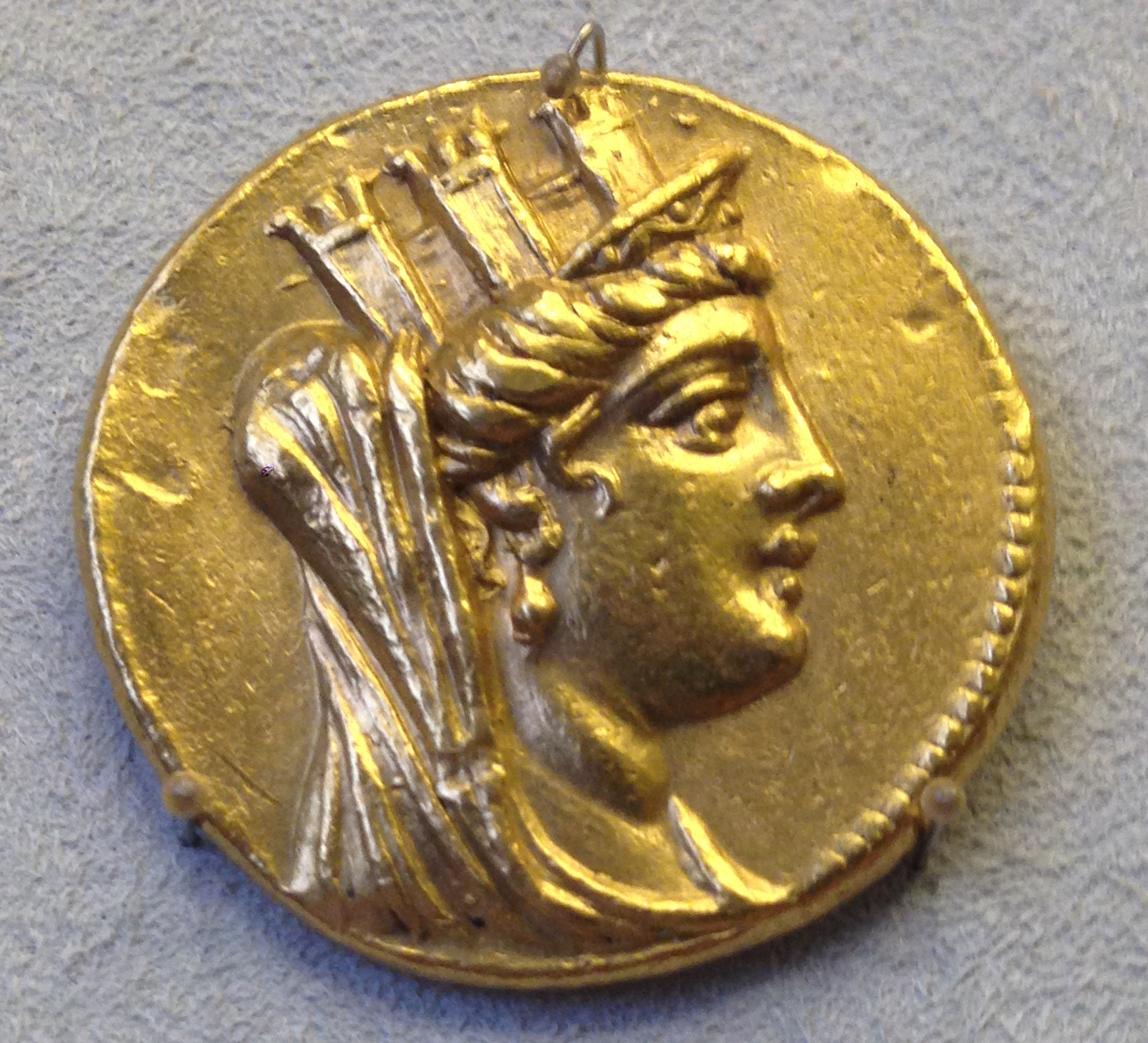
A golden coin depicting Tyche with a mural crown. Found at Tyre, currently in the Bode Museum, Berlin.

Several artefacts feature the Tyche of Antioch with a male swimmer personifying the Orontes River at her feet according to Amin. Her importance to the river is also strengthened by her being considered an Oceanid, according to Giannopoulou. The Antiochene Tyche maintained relevance much later into the Christian dominated empire, as show by official Pentanummium coins minted during the reigns of Justin (r. 518-527) and Justinian (r. 527-565) that depict her in her temple on the reverse.

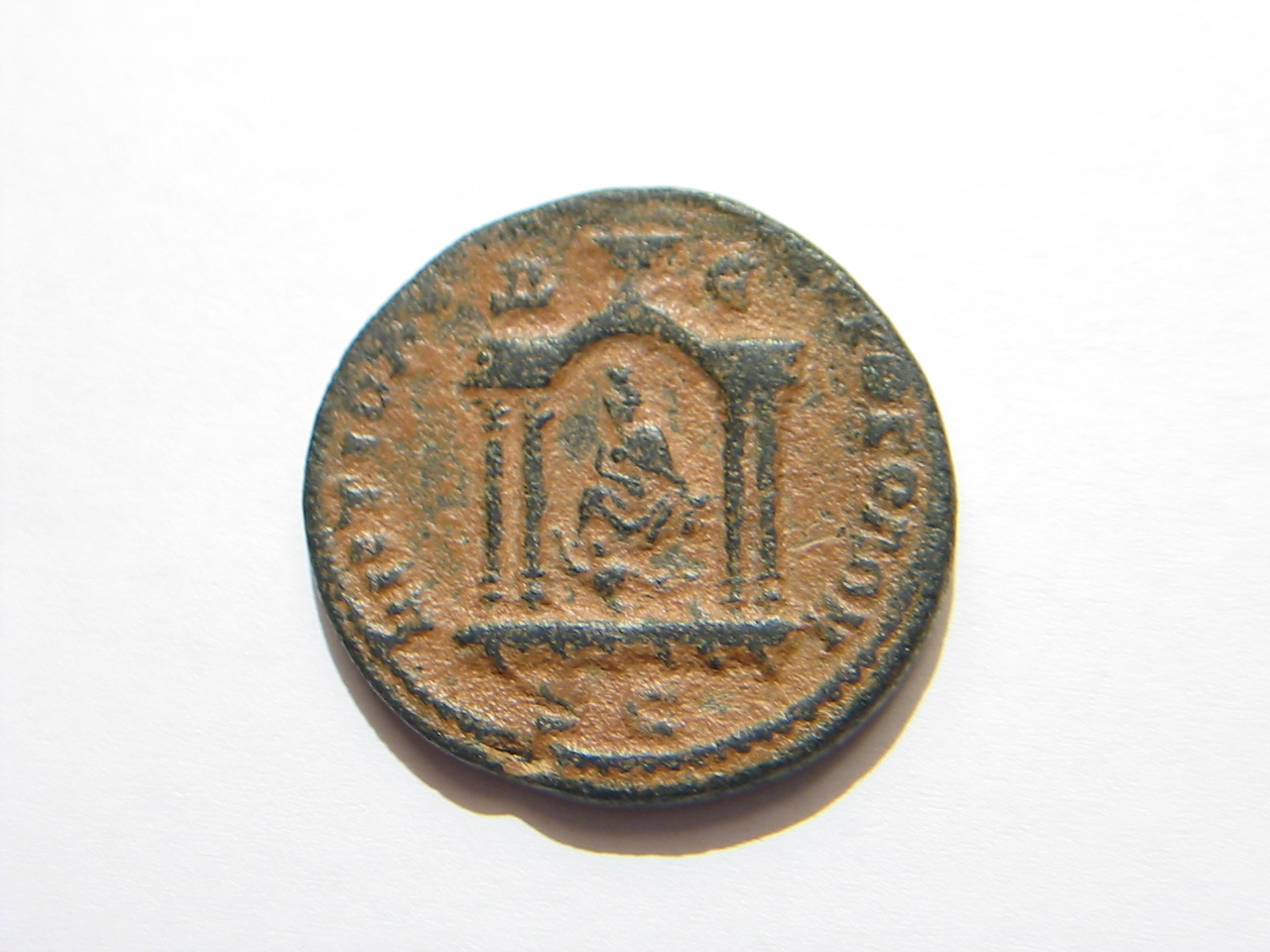
Provincial bronze coin of Trebonianus Gallus (reverse)

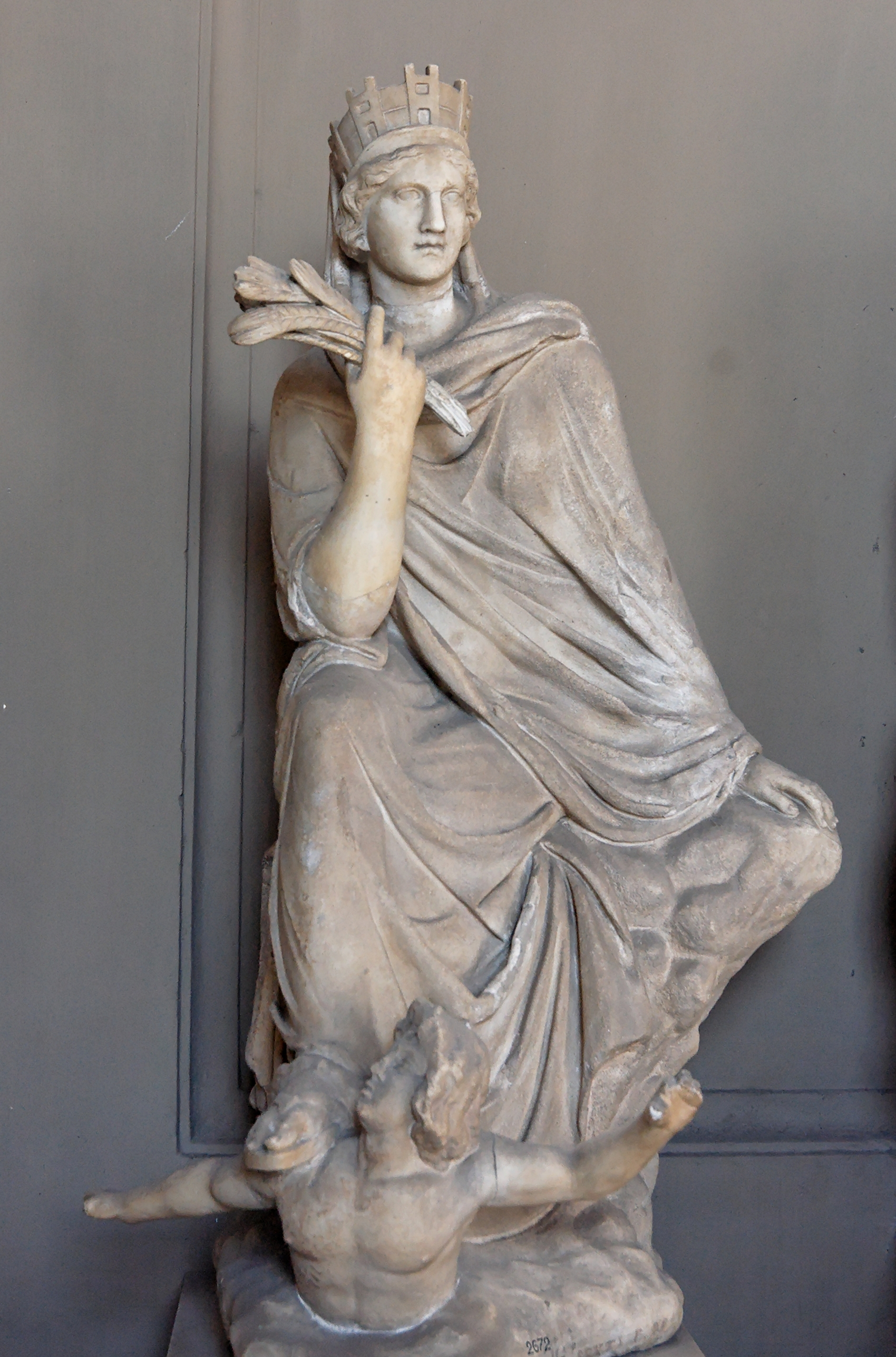
Roman copy of a bronze by Eutychides, Galleria dei Candelabri, Vatican Museums

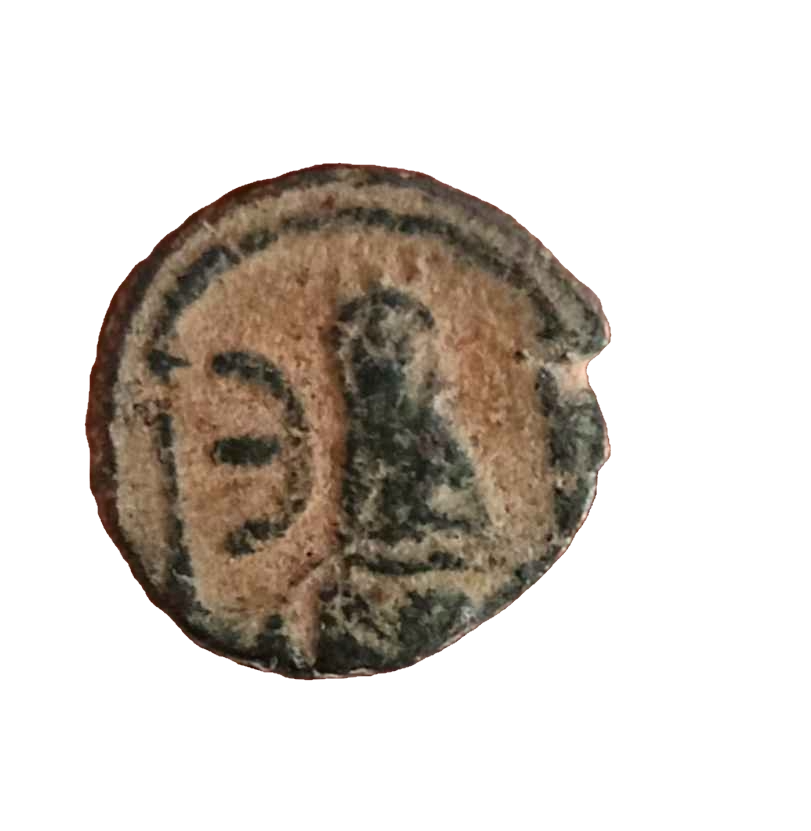
Pentanummium of Justin showing the Tyche on the reverse, along with the E (Epsilon) mark, showing the coin was worth 5 Nummi

== Tyche in the Parthian Empire ==
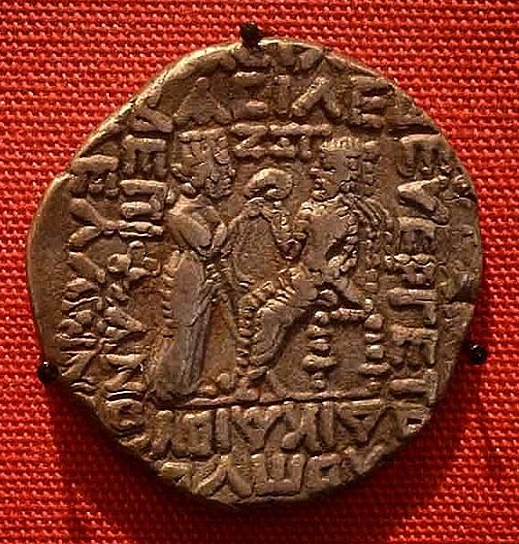
Silver Tetradrachm of Vologases I Enthroned king Vologases I facing left, receiving diadem from Tyche, standing with sceptre. AD 55-56

In the early years of the Parthian Empire, Parthian kings, starting with Mithridates I (165 BC) utilized imagery of the Olympian gods in their coinage, often with the term ΦΙΛΕΛΛΗΝΟΣ (friend of the Greeks) as a conciliatory gesture to subject Greek people living in the former Seleucid Empire lands. However, by the time of Vologases I (51 AD), the only Greek imagery used on coins was the goddess Tyche, who continued to be represented on Parthian coins for the next 200 years. In later imagery, Tyche provides the Khvarenah or projection of divine rulership in Zoroastrianism to the worthy king. It is unclear whether this "Parthian Tyche" simultaneously represented a Zoroastrian goddess such as Anahita or Ashi, or possibly another.
