= Bʼutz Aj Sak Chiik =

- Ajaw

King of Palenque
- Reign: 28 July 487 – 501
- Predecessor: "Casper"
- Successor: Ahkal Moʼ Nahb I
- Born: 15 November 459; Palenque
- Died: 501 (aged 41–42); Palenque
- Father: "Casper" (possibly)
- Religion: Maya religion

Bʼutz Aj Sak Chiik, (Note: The ruler's name, when transcribed is bu-tzʼa-ja-SAK-chi[ku], translated "Smoking White/Resplendent Coati?".) also known as Manik, (November 15, 459 – 501?), was an ajaw of the Maya city of Palenque. He took the throne on July 28, 487, reigning until 501. He was likely the brother of Ahkal Moʼ Nahb I. (Note: These are the dates indicated on the Maya inscriptions in Mesoamerican Long Count calendar, Born: 9.1.4.5.0 12 Ahaw 13 Sak and Acceded: 9.2.12.6.18 3 Etzʼnab 11 Xul.)

== Sources ==
Regnal titles
Preceded by "Casper"	Ajaw of Palenque; July 28, 487 – 501	Succeeded by Ahkal Moʼ Nahb I
