= Kʼukʼ Bahlam I =

- Ajaw

King of Palenque
- Reign: 20 March 431 – 435
- Predecessor: None
- Successor: "Casper"
- Born: 30 March 397
- Died: 435 (aged 37–38); Palenque
- Issue: "Casper"
- Religion: Maya religion

Kʼukʼ Bahlam I, (Note: The ruler's name, when transcribed is KʼUKʼ[BAHLAM], translated "Quetzal Jaguar".) also known as Kuk and Bahlum Kʼukʼ, (March 30, 397 – 435?), was a founder and ajaw of the ruling dynasty at the Maya city of Palenque. He founded the dynasty on March 10, 431. (Note: These are the dates indicated on the Maya inscriptions in Mesoamerican Long Count calendar, Born: 8.18.0.13.6 5 Kimi 14 Kʼayab and Acceded: 8.19.15.3.4 1 Kʼan 2 Kʼayab.)

== Depiction ==
One stone censer stand portrays one of the Palenque kings named Kʼukʼ Bahlam, as the subject can be identified by a quetzal (kʼuk') headdress and jaguar (bahlam) ears.

== Sources ==
Regnal titles
Preceded by New creation	Ajaw of Palenque; March 10, 431-435?	Succeeded by "Casper"
