= Casper (Maya ruler) =

Ajaw of the Maya city of Palenque

- Ajaw

King of Palenque
- Reign: 9 August 435 – 487
- Predecessor: Kʼukʼ Bahlam I
- Successor: Bʼutz Aj Sak Chiik
- Born: 8 August 422
- Died: 487 (aged 64–65); Palenque
- Issue: Bʼutz Aj Sak Chiik, King of Palenque (possibly); Ahkal Moʼ Nahb I, King of Palenque (possibly); Ahkal Kuk, King of Tortuguero (possibly)
Names
- Unknown
- Father: Kʼukʼ Bahlam I
- Religion: Maya religion

"Casper", (August 8, 422 – 487?) also known as 11 Rabbit or Casper II, was an ajaw of the Maya city of Palenque from August 9, 435, to 487. He was the immediate successor of Kʼukʼ Bahlam I, who founded the ruling dynasty. (Note: These are the dates indicated on the Maya inscriptions in Mesoamerican Long Count calendar from an inscription at the Temple of the Cross in Palenque, Born: 8.19.6.8.8 11 Lamat 6 Xul and Acceded: 8.19.19.11.17 2 Kaban 10 Xul.) The real name of the ruler has not been deciphered. He was given the nickname Casper by Mayanist scholar Floyd Lounsbury because his name glyph is said to resemble the cartoon character Casper the Friendly Ghost. An incomplete transcription of the name is ch'a-?..

Casper came to power in August 435 at the age of 13 and ruled the city for 52 years. Only Pacal the Great is recorded to have ruled Palenque longer.

== Biography ==
The ajaw known to archaeologists as "Casper" was born August 8, 422 CE, which corresponds to 8.19.6.8.8 in the Mesoamerican Long Count calendar. "Casper" became ruler of Palenque on August 9, 435, one day after his thirteenth birthday, with the Temple of the Cross Tablet recording that "the white headband was tied." On December 9 (9.0.0.0.0), six months after his accession, "Casper" presided over a celebration of the ninth b'aktun at Toktahn, the most important Long Count transition of the Classical Period. The ruler likely also presided over the following k'atun ending dates in 455 and 475.

On a date reconstructed as February 8, 445 (9.0.9.5.9), "Casper" presided over the accession of a group of secondary lords, one of which is named as K'ahk' Chaak. One of the lords may have been the younger brother of "Casper," based on Guillermo Bernal Romero's reading of a glyph on the K'an Tok tablet as "yitz'in," meaning younger brother. Here, "Casper" is given the title "Divine Cloud Center Lord." On November 19, 460 (9.1.5.5.11.) "Casper" is recorded as presiding over the accession of another lord, named as Ahk (or "Turtle").

"Casper" probably died in his mid-60s, probably in 487, when his successor Bʼutz Aj Sak Chiik came to power.

== Works cited ==
- Skidmore, Joel (2010). The Rulers of Palenque (PDF) (5th ed.). Mesoweb Publications.

Regnal titles
Preceded by Kʼukʼ Bahlam I	Ajaw of Palenque; August 9, 435-487	Succeeded by Bʼutz Aj Sak Chiik
