= 565 =

Calendar year

565 in various calendars
- Gregorian calendar: 565; DLXV
- Ab urbe condita: 1318
- Armenian calendar: 14; ԹՎ ԺԴ
- Assyrian calendar: 5315
- Balinese saka calendar: 486–487
- Bengali calendar: −29 – −28
- Berber calendar: 1515
- Buddhist calendar: 1109
- Burmese calendar: −73
- Byzantine calendar: 6073–6074
- Chinese calendar: 甲申年 (Wood Monkey); 3262 or 3055 — to — 乙酉年 (Wood Rooster); 3263 or 3056
- Coptic calendar: 281–282
- Discordian calendar: 1731
- Ethiopian calendar: 557–558
- Hebrew calendar: 4325–4326
- Hindu calendars
- Vikram Samvat: 621–622
- Shaka Samvat: 486–487
- Kali Yuga: 3665–3666
- Holocene calendar: 10565
- Iranian calendar: 57 BP – 56 BP
- Islamic calendar: 59 BH – 58 BH
- Javanese calendar: 453–454
- Julian calendar: 565; DLXV
- Korean calendar: 2898
- Minguo calendar: 1347 before ROC 民前1347年
- Nanakshahi calendar: −903
- Seleucid era: 876/877 AG
- Thai solar calendar: 1107–1108
- Tibetan calendar: ཤིང་ཕོ་སྤྲེ་ལོ་ (male Wood-Monkey); 691 or 310 or −462 — to — ཤིང་མོ་བྱ་ལོ་ (female Wood-Bird); 692 or 311 or −461

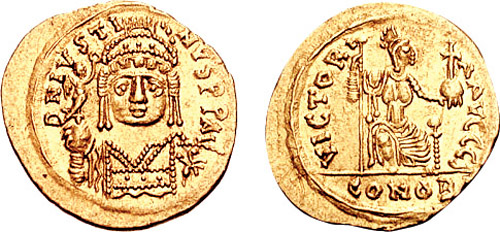
Emperor Justin II (565–578)

Year 565 (DLXV) was a common year starting on Thursday of the Julian calendar. The denomination 565 for this year has been used since the early medieval period, when the Anno Domini calendar era became the prevalent method in Europe for naming years.

== Events ==
=== By place ===
==== Byzantine Empire ====
- November 15 – Justin II succeeds his uncle Justinian I as emperor of the Byzantine Empire. He begins his reign by refusing subsidies to the Avars, who conduct several large-scale raids through the Balkan Peninsula.
- Justin II recalls his cousin Justin (pretender to the throne) to Constantinople; after accusations against him, he is placed under house arrest.
- Justin II sends his son-in-law Baduarius (magister militum) with a Byzantine army, to support the Gepids in their war against the Lombards.
- The Madaba Map is made in the Byzantine church of Saint George. The floor mosaic contains the depiction of the Holy Land (approximate date).

==== Britain ====
- Columba, an Irish missionary, spots the Loch Ness Monster on the River Ness (in present day Scotland) and saves the life of a Pict (approximate date).

==== Europe ====
- Summer – A war erupts between Alboin, the king of the Lombards, and King Cunimund, the leader of the Gepids. (approximate date).

==== Asia ====
- Gao Wei succeeds his father Wu Cheng Di as ruler of the Chinese Northern Qi Dynasty. Wu Cheng Di becomes a regent and Grand Emperor.
- The Uyghurs are defeated by the Göktürks, who expand their territory in Central Asia (approximate date).

==== Central America ====
- February 6 – Kʼan Joy Chitam I, ruler of the Mayan city-state of Palenque, in what is now the state of Chiapas in southern Mexico, dies after a reign of exactly 36 years.
- May 2 – Ahkal Moʼ Nahb II becomes the new ruler of Palenque and reigns until his death in 570.

=== By topic ===
==== Arts and sciences ====
- Agathias begins to write a history, beginning where Procopius finished his work.

==== Religion ====
- January 22 – Patriarch Eutychius of Constantinople is deposed as Ecumenical Patriarch of Constantinople by Justinian I after he refuses the Byzantine Emperor's order to adopt the tenets of the Aphthartodocetae, a sect of Monophysites. From April 12 he is replaced by John Scholasticus.
- Columba begins preaching in the Orkney Islands (approximate date).

== Births ==
- Chen Yueyi, empress of Northern Zhou (approximate date)
- Cuthwine, prince of Wessex (approximate date)
- Gundoald, Bavarian nobleman (approximate date)
- Marutha of Tikrit, Persian theologian (d. 649)
- Mirin, Irish monk and missionary (approximate date)
- Sisebut, king of the Visigoths (approximate date)
- Witteric, king of the Visigoths (approximate date)
- Yuan Leshang, empress of Northern Zhou

== Deaths ==
- November 14 – Justinian I, emperor of the Byzantine Empire
- Audoin, king of the Lombards (approximate date)
- Belisarius, Byzantine general ("Last of the Romans")
- Diarmait mac Cerbaill, High King (approximate date)
- Imru' al-Qais, was a pre-Islamic Arabian poet and last King of Kinda
- Procopius, Byzantine historian (approximate date)
- Samson of Dol, bishop and saint (approximate date)

== Establishments ==
- Saint Catherine's Monastery in Mount Sinai, Saint Catherine, South Sinai Governorate, Egypt by Justinian I, which contains the oldest active library, being Ebla tablets (c. 2500–2250 BC) in the city of Ebla, Syria, discovered by Italian archaeologist Paolo Matthiae and his team in 1974–75, the first, if not the oldest, inactive library.
