= Ahkal Moʼ Nahb II =

Ajaw of the Maya city of Palenque

- Ajaw

King of Palenque
- Reign: 2 May 565 - 21 July 570
- Predecessor: Kʼan Joy Chitam I
- Successor: Kan Bahlam I
- Born: 3 September 523; Palenque
- Died: 21 July 570 (aged 46); Palenque
- Father: Kʼan Joy Chitam I
- Religion: Maya religion

Ahkal Moʼ Nahb II (Note: The ruler's name, when transcribed is a-ku-AL MOʼ-na-bi, translated "Turtle Macaw Lake?".) also known as Chaacal II and Akul Anab II, (September 3, 523 – July 21, 570) was an ajaw of the Maya city-state of Palenque. He took the throne on May 2, 565, eighty-five days after the death of Kʼan Joy Chitam I. (Note: These are the dates indicated on the Maya inscriptions in Mesoamerican Long Count calendar, Born: 9.4.9.0.4 7 Kʼan 17 Mol, Acceded: 9.6.11.5.1 1 Imix 4 Sip and Died: 9.6.16.10.7 9 Manikʼ 5 Yaxkʼin.) He was the grandson of Ahkal Moʼ Nahb I and probably the brother of Kan Bahlam I.

== Sources ==
Regnal titles
Preceded by Kʼan Joy Chitam I	Ajaw of Palenque; May 2, 565 – July 21, 570	Succeeded by Kan Bahlam I
