= Carthage Treasure =

Important Roman silver hoard found in Carthage

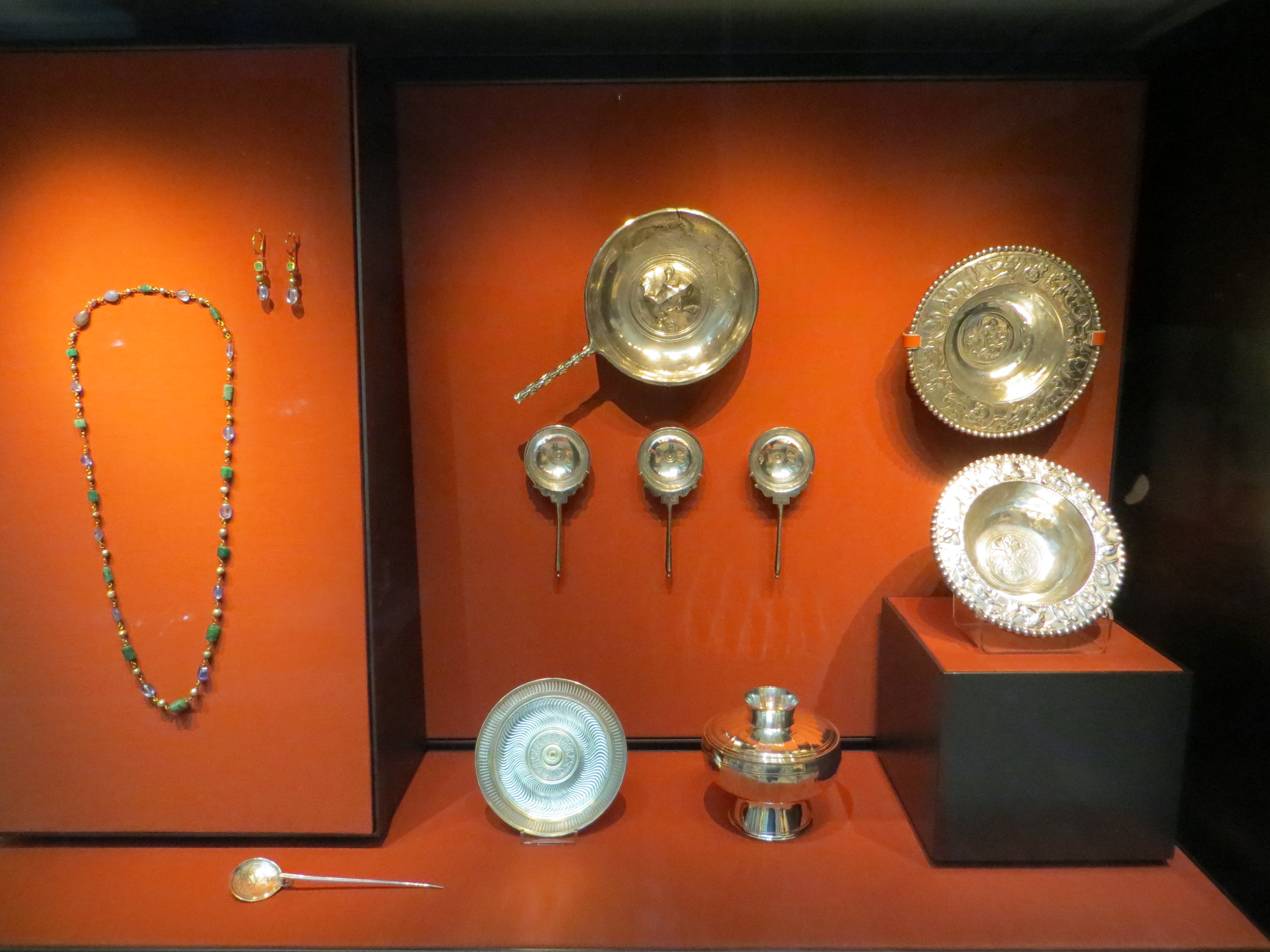
- Part of the Carthage Treasure as currently displayed in the British Museum
- Material: Silver
- Created: 4th century AD
- Present location: British Museum, London; Louvre, Paris

The Carthage Treasure is a Roman silver hoard, which was found in Tunis, Tunisia, at the site of the ancient city of Carthage. The treasure principally consists of silver tableware and jewellery, most of which is now held at the British Museum.

== Discovery ==
The hoard was unearthed in the 19th century at the Hill of St Louis in Carthage, which at the time of its deposition was the largest city of Africa Proconsulare. Most of the treasure was purchased by Sir Augustus Wollaston Franks, a senior curator at the British Museum, who bequeathed it to the museum upon his death in 1897. A small part of the treasure can be found in the Louvre, in Paris, including one of the silver covered bowls.

== Dating and attribution ==
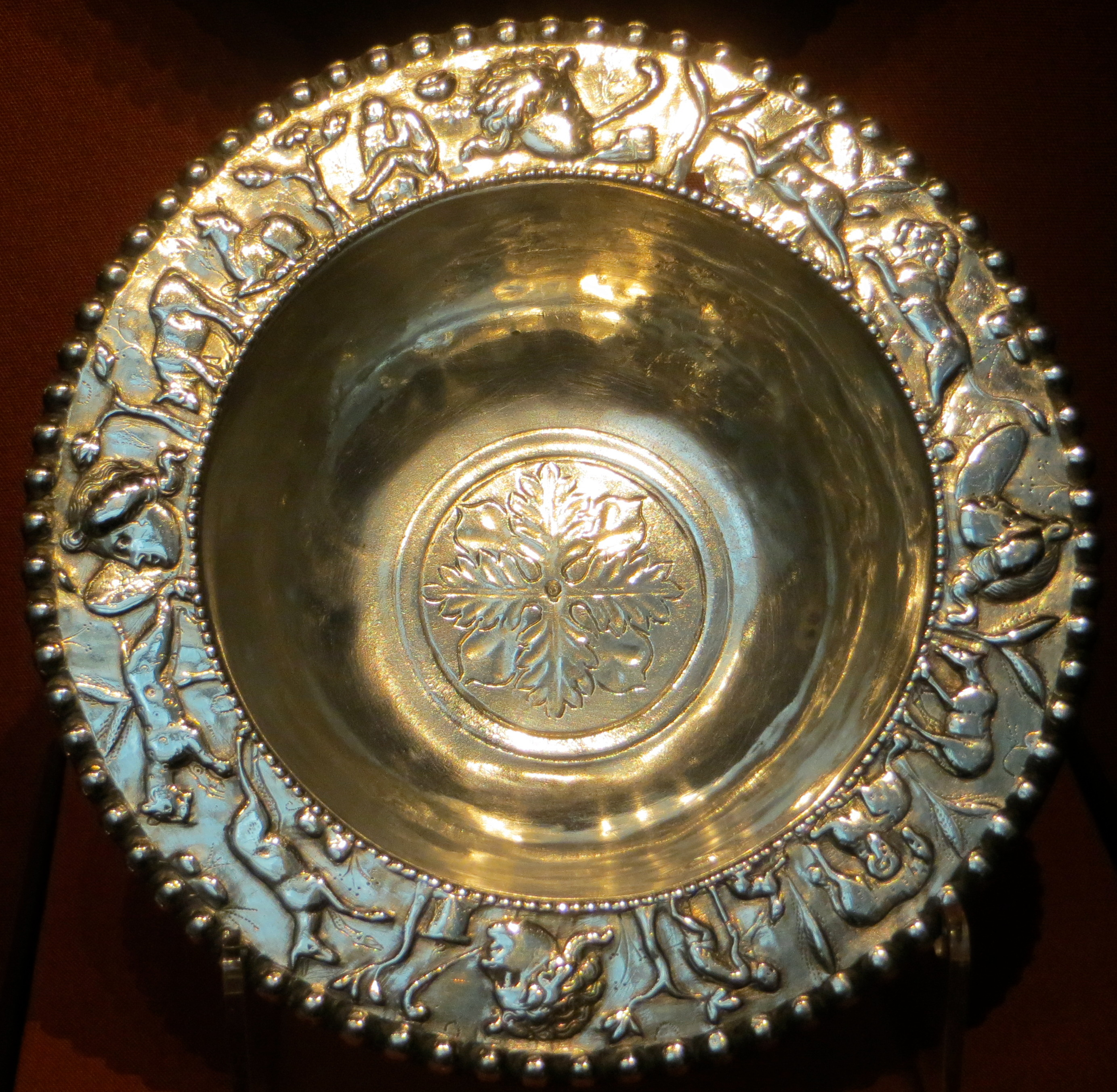
A bowl with low relief scenes of shepherds

Dating to the second half of the fourth century AD, the Carthage Treasure comprises 31 different objects, primarily luxury silver tableware and jewellery that must have belonged to a wealthy Roman family who for some reason decided to bury it for safe-keeping. This may have been because of the religious feud around 400, but it is more likely that the treasure was hidden from the Vandals. The Vandals, led by Gaiseric, invaded Africa Proconsulare from Spain in 429 and in the Battle of Carthage (439) the city became capital of the Vandal Kingdom. Inscribed in the centre of one of the dishes around the tondo is D D ICRESCONI CLARENT, which is associated with the Cresconii, a powerful Roman North African family in Carthage who are well known from deeds and records of office-holders at this time.

== Description ==
The treasure includes a pair of flat dishes (one of which identifies the family), two bowls with chased and hammered pastoral scenes in relief around the edge, four hemispherical bowls with high tapering feet (two of which still have their covers), a shallow bowl with handle and frog engraved in the centre, twelve silver spoons, and a mixed collection of jewellery: a finger ring, a cameo, a pair of ear rings, several intaglios and two necklaces, one made of gold, the other with precious stones. The jewelled necklace consists of twelve polygonal emeralds, thirteen sapphires, matched by twenty-five pearls all joined by gold links.

The family would have owned two collections of silver: One known as argentum potorium that was the drinking set, and another for eating called the argentum escarium. Amongst this find were several silver hemispherical lidded bowls that measure 12 cm high and 12 cm in diameter. The vessels' elegant design includes a tall base that complements the knop of the bowl's lid. The bowls also incorporate subtle facets on the lids' curved surfaces. Similar bowls have been found at the Roman site of Viminacium near modern Kostolac in Serbia.

== Gallery ==
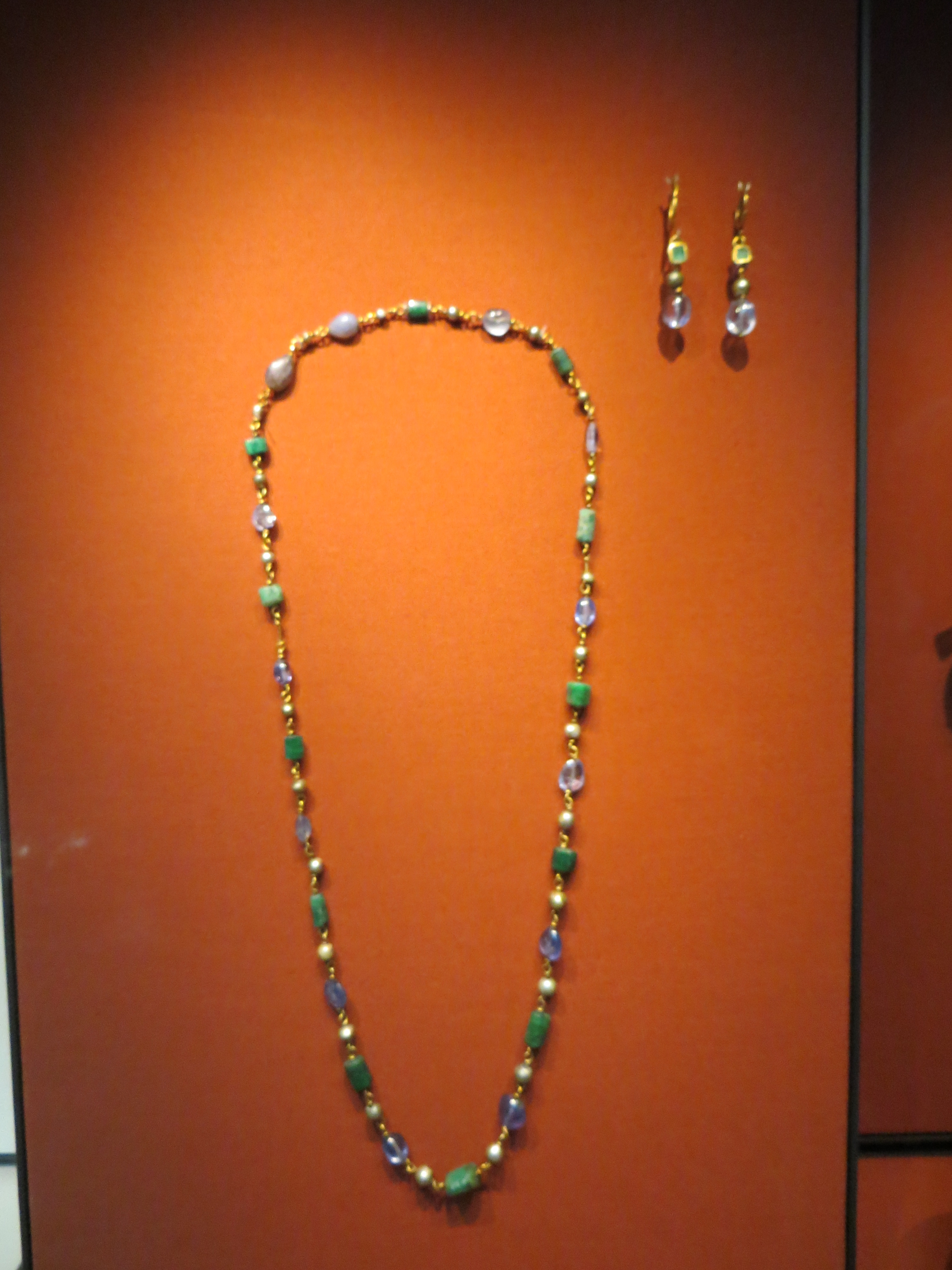
One of the necklaces (made of pearls and sapphires) next to the pair of ear rings

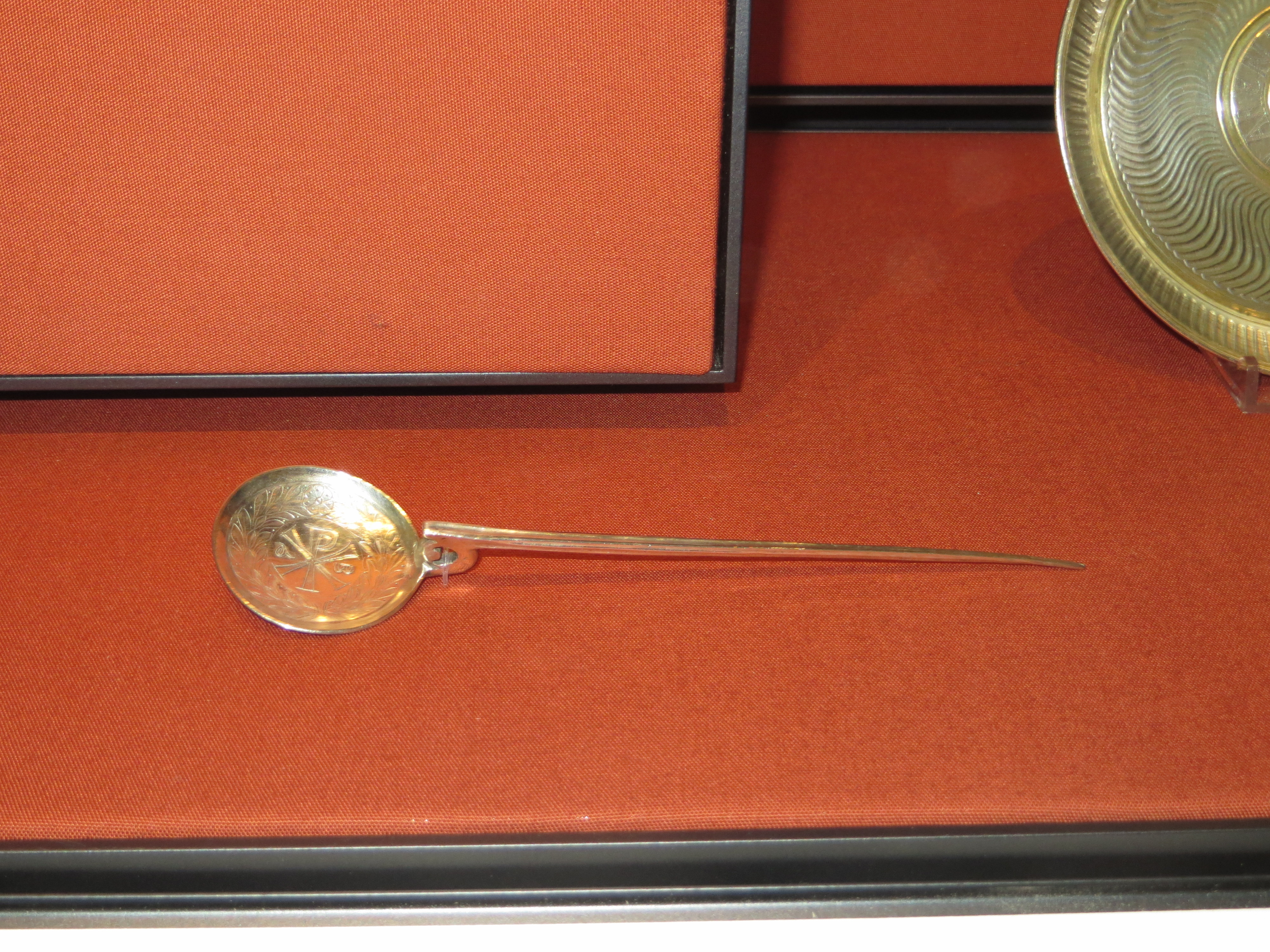
A silver spoon with an apocalyptic Chrismon engraved in the centre

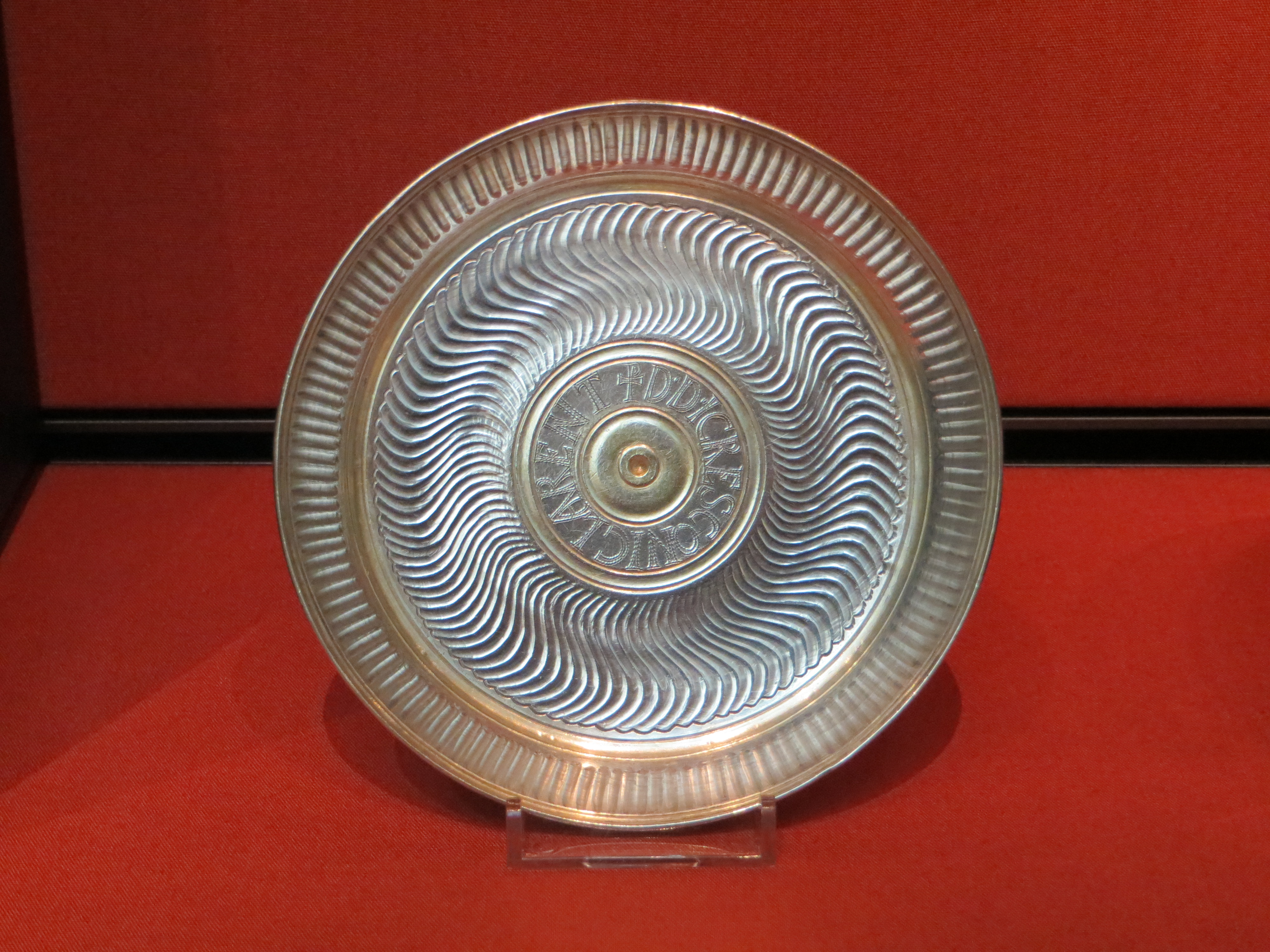
A flat bowl with Latin inscription around the centre

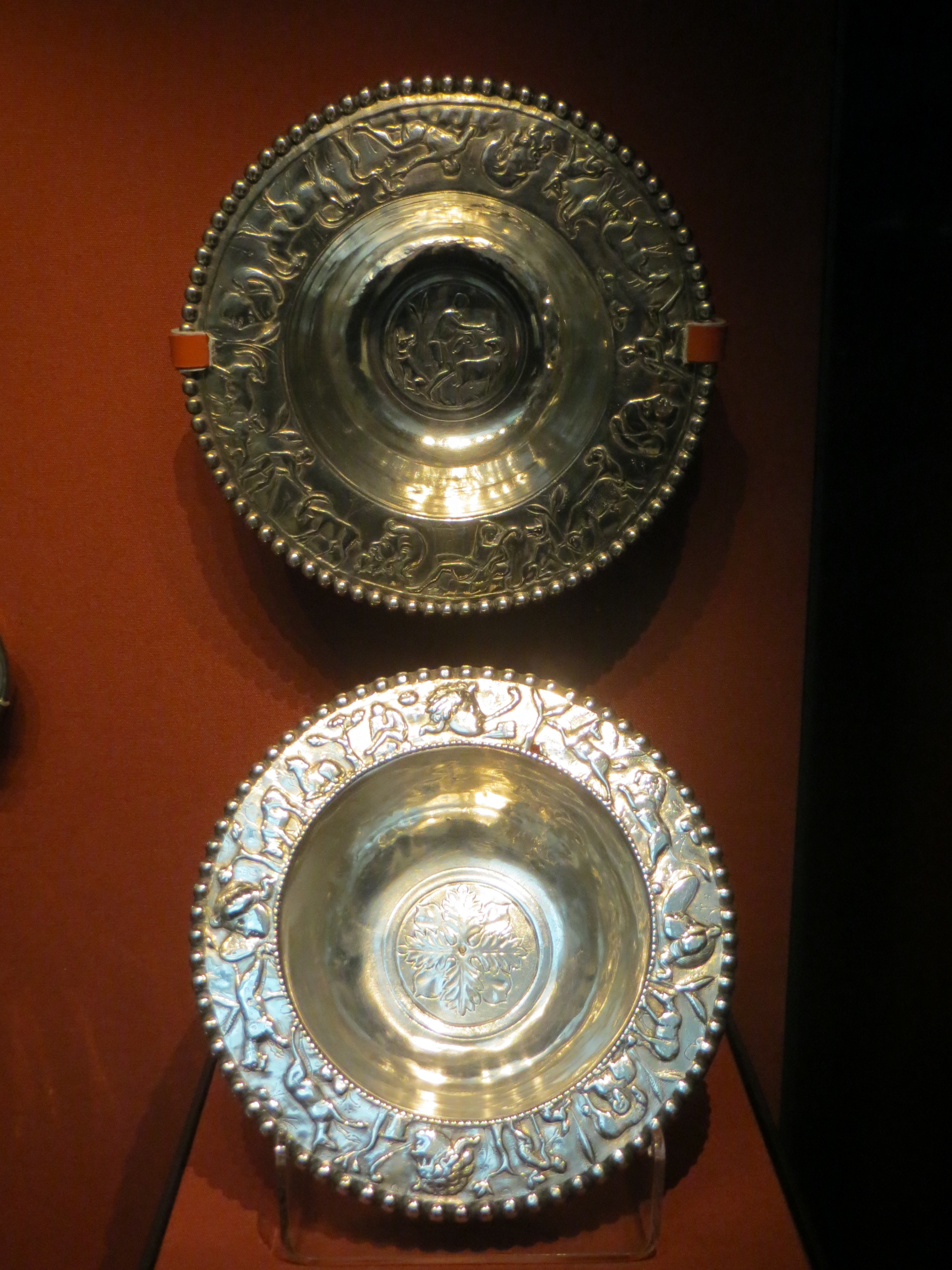
Two elaborately decorated bowls with pastoral and bacchic scenes

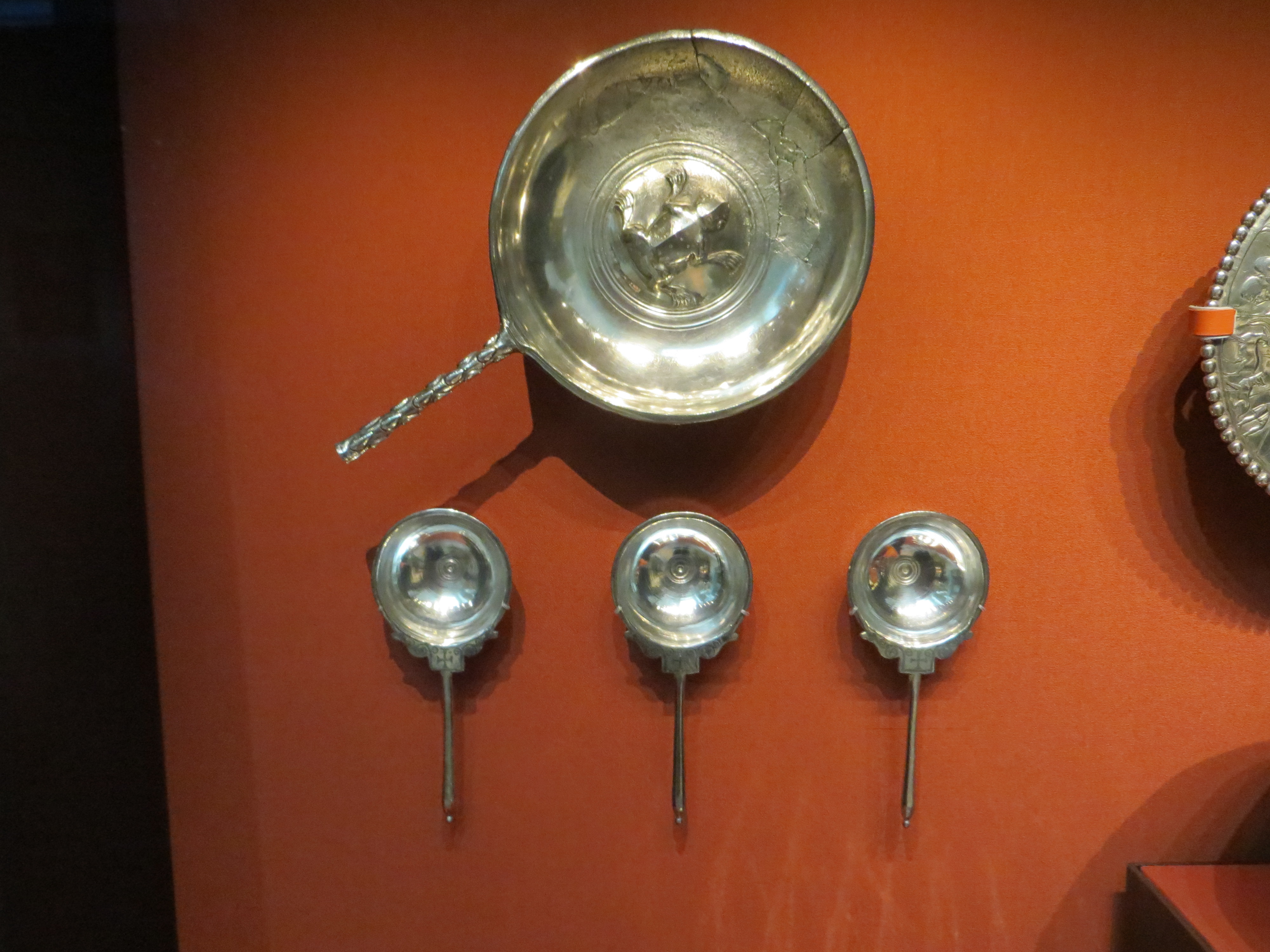
Shallow bowl above three silver spoons

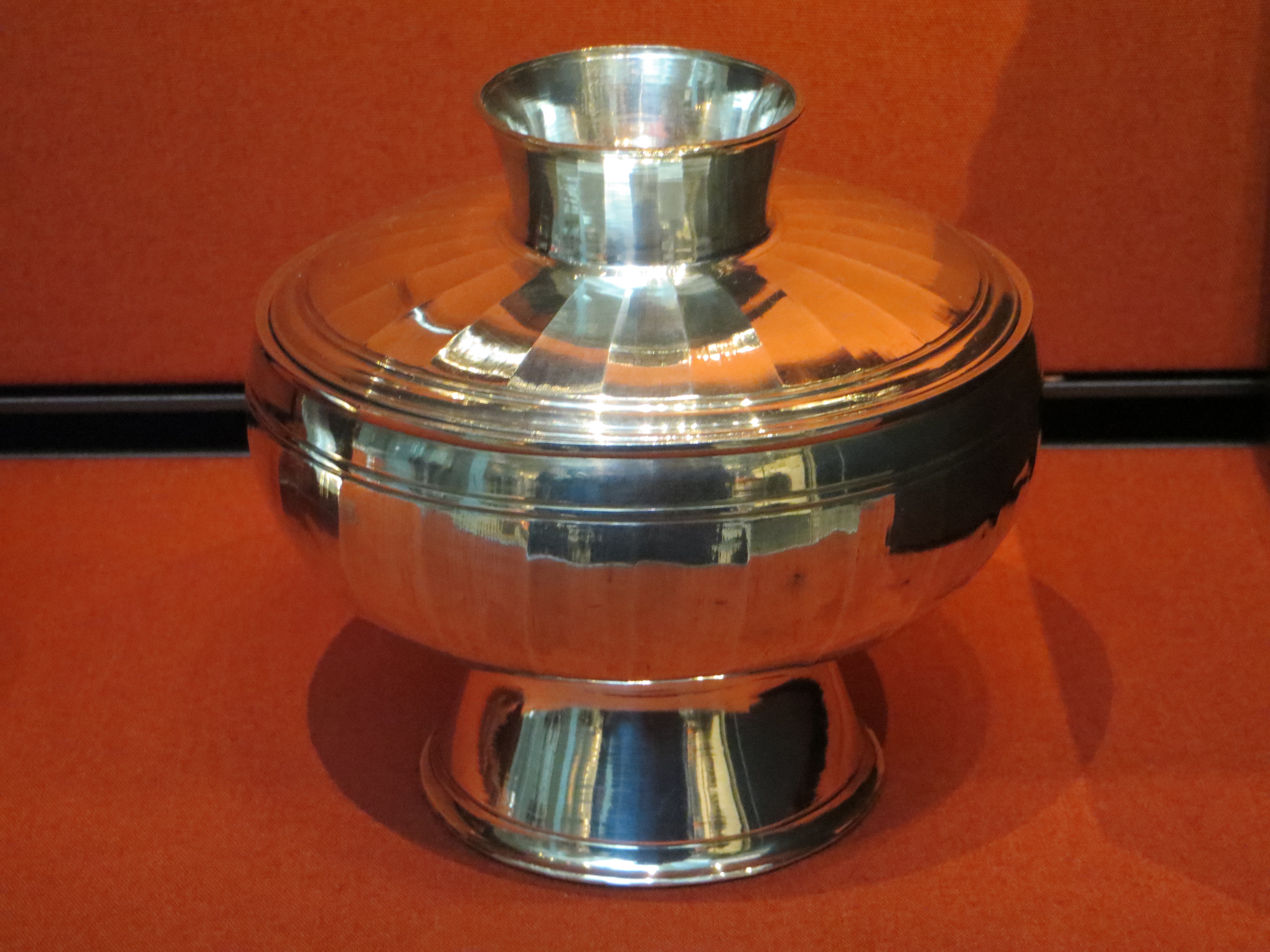
One of the hemispherical covered bowls

== See also ==
- Esquiline Treasure
- Mildenhall Treasure
- Sevso Treasure

== Bibliography ==
- Kent, J. & Painter K. S. (eds), Wealth of the Roman world: AD 300–700, British Museum Publications, 1977, ISBN 0714100617, 9780714100616
- D. Strong, Greek and Roman Silver Plate (British Museum Press, 1966)
- L. Burn, The British Museum Book of Greek and Roman Art (British Museum Press, 1991)
- S. Walker, Roman Art (British Museum Press, 1991)
