= Kan Bahlam I =

- Ajaw

King of Palenque
- Reign: 6 April 572 – 1 February 583
- Predecessor: Ahkal Moʼ Nahb II
- Successor: Lady Yohl Ikʼnal
- Born: 18 September 524; Palenque
- Died: 1 February 583 (aged 58); Palenque
- Issue: Lady Yohl Ikʼnal (possibly)
- Father: Kʼan Joy Chitam I
- Religion: Maya religion

Kan Bahlam I (Note: The ruler's name, when transcribed is (K'INICH) KAN[BAHLAM]-ma, translated "Radiant Snake Jaguar".) (Mayan pronunciation: [kan ɓahlam]), also known as Chan Bahlum I, (September 18, 524 – February 1, 583) was an ajaw of the Maya city-state of Palenque. He acceded to the throne on April 6, 572 at age 47 and ruled until his death. (Note: These are the dates indicated on the Maya inscriptions in Mesoamerican Long Count calendar, Born: 9.4.10.1.5 11 Chikchan 13 Ch'en, Acceded: 9.6.18.5.12 10 Eb 0 Wo and Died: 9.7.9.5.5 11 Chikchan 3 K'ayab.) Kan Bahlam was most likely the younger brother of his predecessor, Ahkal Moʼ Nahb II and probably son of Kʼan Joy Chitam I. He was the first ruler of Palenque to use the title Kʼinich, albeit inconsistently. The title is usually translated as "radiant" but literally means "sun-faced".

== Sources ==
Regnal titles
Preceded by Ahkal Moʼ Nahb II	Ajaw of Palenque; April 6, 572 – February 1, 583	Succeeded by Yohl Ikʼnal
