= Tyche of Constantinople =

Deity guardian of Constantinople

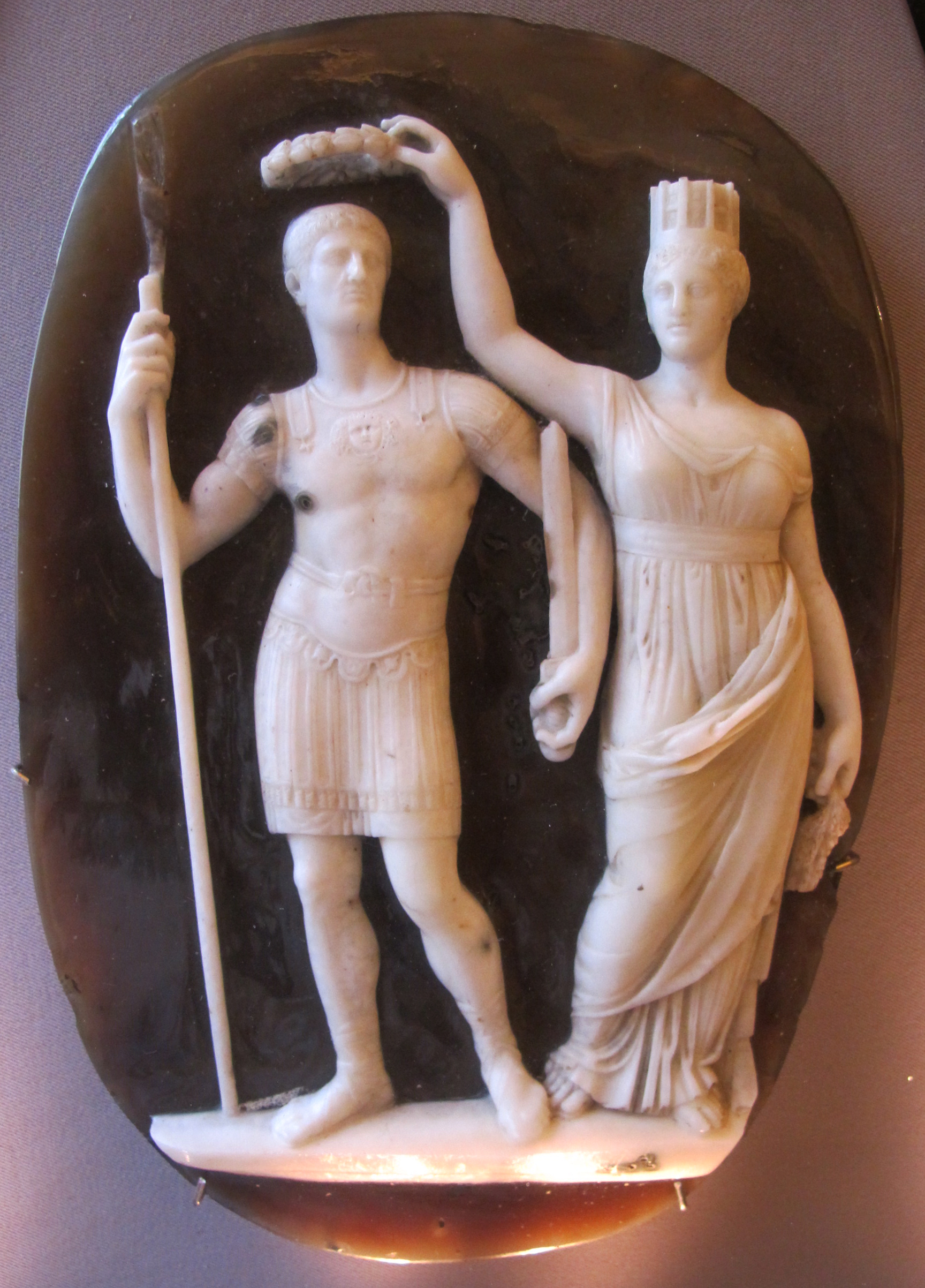
The Tyche of Constantinople holding a wreath to crown Constantine (sardonyx cameo, 4th century)

The Tyche of Constantinople was the deity of fortune (Tyche) who embodied the guardianship (tutela) of the city of Constantinople in the Roman Imperial era. Malalas says that her name was Anthousa (Roman equivalent Flora). Her attributes included the mural crown, cornucopia, a ship's prow, and a spear. She was depicted standing or seated on a throne. As the personification of the city, Tyche or Anthousa could be abstracted from her origins as a Classical goddess, and like Victory made tolerable as a symbol for Christians. Under Constantine, the Tychai of Rome and Constantinople together might be presented as personifications of the empire ruling the world.

Tyche of Constantinople appears in two basic guises on coins and medallions. In one, she wears a helmet like Dea Roma. In the other, which was used for instance on silver medallions in 330 AD to commemorate Constantine's inauguration day, Tyche wears a crown of towers representing city walls, and sits on a throne with a ship's prow at her feet.

The iconography of Tyche shared some attributes with Cybele, especially the wearing of the turreted or mural crown as a patron of cities. According to Zosimus, who appears not to have converted to Christianity, Constantine had one statue of Rhea-Cybele altered "through his disregard for religion, by taking away the lions on each side and changing the arrangement of the hands; for whereas previously she was apparently restraining lions, now she seemed to be praying and looking to the city as if guarding it." His intention seems to have been to render Cybele as the Tyche of Constantinople, in keeping with a general adaptation of Imperial cult for the newly Christianized regime. Proskynesis (prostration as submission to authority) was performed before emperors and symbols of imperial authority including the Tyche, and later before Christian symbols.

One tradition held that Constantine had a cross inscribed on the Tyche of Constantinople near the Milion, and that the emperor Julian, who opposed Christianity, rejected this manifestation of Tyche. The Tyche of Constantinople continues to appear in art of the Eastern Roman Empire into the 6th century, among such examples as a consular diptych and jewelry ornaments.
