= Kʼan Joy Chitam I =

- Ajaw

King of Palenque
- Reign: February 6, 529 – February 6, 565
- Predecessor: Interregnum; Title last held by Ahkal Moʼ Nahb I (524)
- Successor: Ahkal Moʼ Nahb II
- Born: 3 May 490; Palenque
- Died: 6 February 565 (aged 74); Palenque
- Issue: Ahkal Moʼ Nahb II; Kan Bahlam I Lady Yohl Ik'nal (possibly)
- Father: Ahkal Moʼ Nahb I (possibly)
- Religion: Maya religion

Kʼan Joy Chitam I, (Note: The ruler's name, when transcribed is KʼAN-na-JOY[CHITAM]-ma, translated "Precious/Yellow Tied Peccary".) also known as Hok, Kan Xul I and Kʼan Hokʼ Chitam I, (May 3, 490 – February 6, 565) was an ajaw of the Maya city-state of Palenque. He took the throne on February 6, 529 at age 34, ending an interregnum that had lasted for a little over four years. (Note: These are the dates indicated on the Maya inscriptions in Mesoamerican Long Count calendar, Born: 9.2.15.3.8 12 Lamat 6 Wo, Acceded: 9.4.14.10.4 5 Kʼan 12 Kʼayab and Died: 9.6.11.0.16 7 Kib 4 Kʼayab.)

== Sources ==
Regnal titles
| Preceded by Interregnum; Title last held by Ahkal Moʼ Nahb I (524) | Ajaw of Palenque; February 6, 529 – February 6, 565 | Succeeded by Ahkal Moʼ Nahb II |
