= Ahkal Moʼ Nahb I =

Ajaw of the Maya city of Palenque

- Ajaw

King of Palenque
- Reign: 3 June 501 – 29 November 524
- Predecessor: Bʼutz Aj Sak Chiik
- Successor: Interregnum; Title next held by Kʼan Joy Chitam I (529)
- Born: 5 July 465; Palenque
- Died: 29 November 524 (aged 59); Palenque
- Issue: Kʼan Joy Chitam I (possibly)
- Father: "Casper" (possibly)
- Religion: Maya religion

Ahkal Moʼ Nahb I, (Note: The ruler's name, when transcribed is a-ku-AL MOʼNA꞉B, translated "Turtle Macaw Lake?".) also known as Chaacal and Akul Anab I (July 5, 465 – November 29, 524), was an ajaw of the Maya city of Palenque. He ruled from June 5, 501 AD to his death. (Note: These are the dates indicated on the Maya inscriptions in Mesoamerican Long Count calendar, Born: 9.1.10.0.0 5 Ajaw 3 Sek, Acceded: 9.3.6.7.17 5 Kaban 0 Sotzʼ and Died: 9.4.10.4.17 5 Kaban 5 Mak.)

== Family ==
Ahkal Moʼ Nahb I is the earliest recorded ruler of Palenque whose exact dates of birth, accession and death have been verified. He was possibly the younger brother of his immediate predecessor, Bʼutz Aj Sak Chiik. For unknown reasons Ahkal Moʼ Nahbʼ is mentioned several times in official narratives left by Pacal the Great, who ruled Palenque a century later. It is believed Pacal considered Ahkal Moʼ Naabʼ I a particularly important historical figure or his ancestor.

== Sources ==
Regnal titles
Preceded by Bʼutz Aj Sak Chiik	Ajaw of Palenque; June 3, 501 – November 29, 524	Succeeded by Interregnum title next held by Kʼan Joy Chitam I (529)
