= 612 =

Calendar year

612 in various calendars
- Gregorian calendar: 612; DCXII
- Ab urbe condita: 1365
- Armenian calendar: 61; ԹՎ ԿԱ
- Assyrian calendar: 5362
- Balinese saka calendar: 533–534
- Bengali calendar: 18–19
- Berber calendar: 1562
- Buddhist calendar: 1156
- Burmese calendar: −26
- Byzantine calendar: 6120–6121
- Chinese calendar: 辛未年 (Metal Goat); 3309 or 3102 — to — 壬申年 (Water Monkey); 3310 or 3103
- Coptic calendar: 328–329
- Discordian calendar: 1778
- Ethiopian calendar: 604–605
- Hebrew calendar: 4372–4373
- Hindu calendars
- Vikram Samvat: 668–669
- Shaka Samvat: 533–534
- Kali Yuga: 3712–3713
- Holocene calendar: 10612
- Iranian calendar: 10 BP – 9 BP
- Islamic calendar: 10 BH – 9 BH
- Japanese calendar: N/A
- Javanese calendar: 502–503
- Julian calendar: 612; DCXII
- Korean calendar: 2945
- Minguo calendar: 1300 before ROC 民前1300年
- Nanakshahi calendar: −856
- Seleucid era: 923/924 AG
- Thai solar calendar: 1154–1155
- Tibetan calendar: ལྕགས་མོ་ལུག་ལོ་ (female Iron-Sheep); 738 or 357 or −415 — to — ཆུ་ཕོ་སྤྲེ་ལོ་ (male Water-Monkey); 739 or 358 or −414

Year 612 (DCXII) was a leap year starting on Saturday of the Julian calendar. The denomination 612 for this year has been used since the early medieval period, when the Anno Domini calendar era became the prevalent method in Europe for naming years.

== Events ==
=== By place ===
==== Byzantine Empire ====
- August 13 – Empress Eudokia, wife of Heraclius, dies of epilepsy. She leaves two children, and is buried in the Church of the Holy Apostles in Constantinople.

==== Europe ====
- King Theudebert II is defeated by his brother Theuderic II at Toul (northeastern France). He is captured in battle and, after having his royal paraphernalia taken, is handed over to his grandmother Brunhilda. He is put in a monastery, and assassinated with his son Merovech. Theuderic, age 25, becomes sole ruler of Austrasia and Burgundy.
- Sisebut succeeds Gundemar as king of the Visigoths. He begins a campaign against the remains of Byzantine power in Spania.

==== Asia ====
- Goguryeo–Sui War: Emperor Yángdi invades Goguryeo (Korea) with an expeditionary force of over one million men, named the "24 Armies".
- Battle of Salsu: A Sui force of 305,000 men is defeated by the Korean general Ŭlchi Mundŏk at the Yalu River; only 2,700 troops survive.

==== Mesoamerica ====
- October 22 – Sak Kʼukʼ succeeds her father Ajen Yohl Mat, as queen of the Maya state of Palenque (modern Mexico).

=== By topic ===
==== Religion ====
- Columbanus moves to Italy and establishes the monastery of Bobbio (approximate date).
- The Holy Sponge is brought to Constantinople from Palestine.
- Arnulf, counselor of Theudebert II, becomes bishop of Metz.
- Gallus founds the monastery of St. Gallen (Switzerland).

== Births ==
- May 3 – Constantine III, Byzantine emperor (d. 641)
- Germanus of Granfelden, Frankish abbot (approximate date)
- Oswiu, king of Northumbria (approximate date)

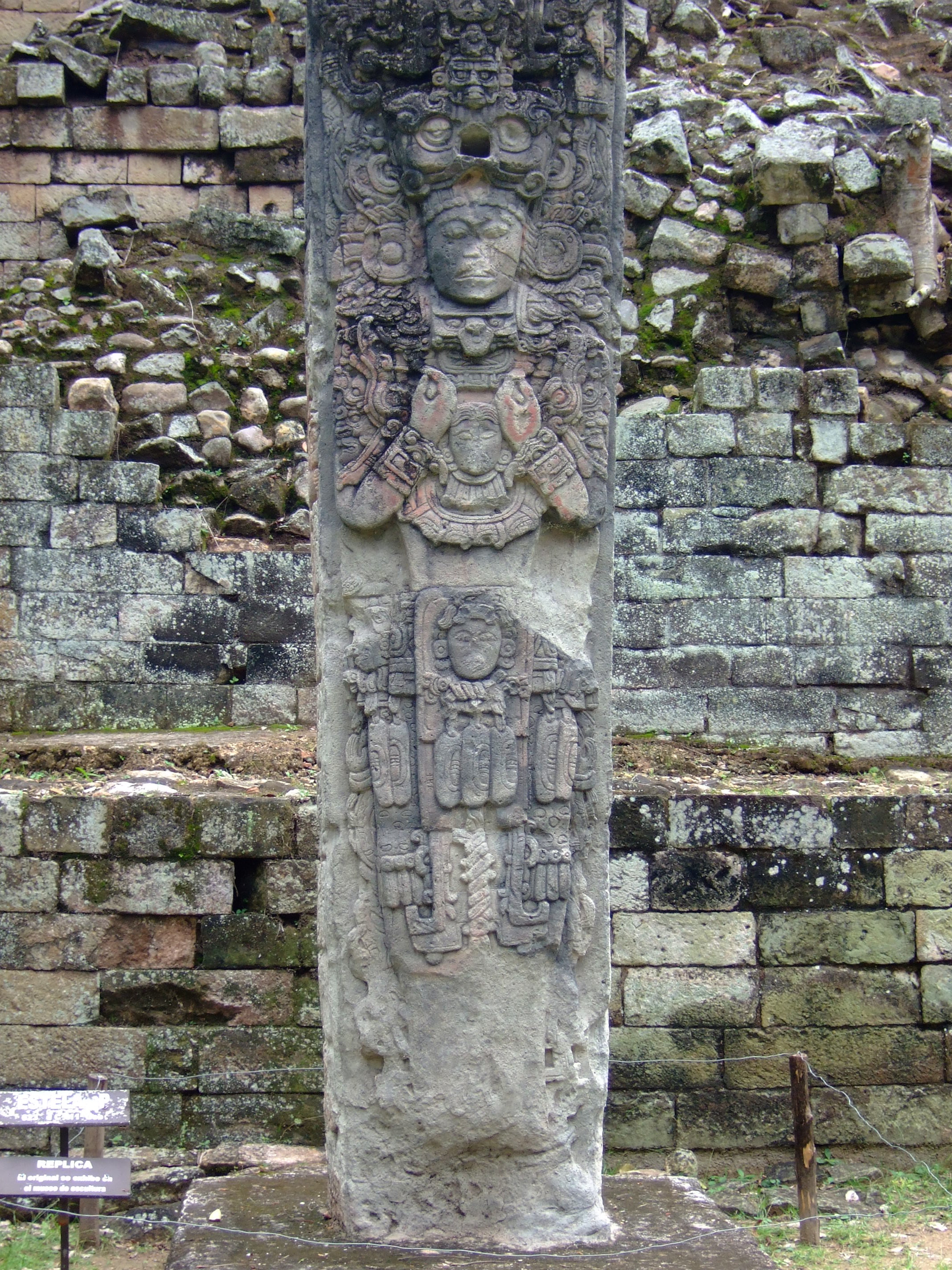
Stela of K'ak' Chan Yopaat

== Deaths ==
- c. February–March – Gundemar, king of the Visigoths
- March 6 – Janaab' Pakal, king of Palenque
- August 13 – Fabia Eudokia, Byzantine empress consort
- Áed Uaridnach, High King of Ireland
- Ajen Yohl Mat, king of Palenque
- Conall Laeg Breg, king of Brega (Ireland)
- Theudebert II, king of Austrasia (b. 586)
