= Kʼan Moʼ Hix =

- Nobleman of Palenque
- Died: after 612
- Wife: Sak Kʼukʼ
- Issue: Kʼinich Janaab Pakal I Ajen Yohl Mat?

Kʼan Moʼ Hix, (lived around 612), was a nobleman of the Maya city-state of Palenque. He was husband of Sak Kʼukʼ, queen of Palenque, and father of Kʼinich Janaab Pakal I, who was one of the greatest rulers of Palenque and was responsible for the construction or extension of some of Palenque's most notable surviving inscriptions and monumental architecture. He could be a possible father of Ajen Yohl Mat.
