= Yohl Ikʼnal =

Queen of the Mayan city-state of Palenque from 583 to 604

Lady Yohl Ikʼnal
- Ajaw

Queen of Palenque
- Reign: 23 December 583 – 7 November 604
- Coronation: 23 December 583
- Predecessor: Kan Bahlam I
- Successor: Ajen Yohl Mat
- Born: Before 583; Palenque, Bʼaakal
- Died: 7 November 604; Palenque, Bʼaakal
- Burial: Temple 20 of Palenque (proposed)
- Spouse: Janahb Pakal (possibly her son instead)
- Issue: Ajen Yohl Mat; Janahb Pakal (possibly her husband instead); Lady Sak Kʼukʼ
Names
- Ix Yohl Ikʼnal
- House: Palenque dynasty
- Dynasty: Bʼaakal dynasty
- Father: Kʼan Joy Chitam I or Kan Bahlam I
- Religion: Maya religion

Yohl Ikʼnal (Note: The ruler's name, when transcribed from Maya script is IX-(Y)O꞉L-la IKʼ-NAL-la, translated as "Lady Heart of the Wind Place" or "Heart of the Spirit Place". The prefix "Ix" or "Lady" denotes her female gender in Classic Maya naming conventions.) (Mayan pronunciation: [johl ikʼnal]), also known as Lady Kan Ik, Lady Kʼanal Ikʼnal, and sometimes rendered as Ix Yohl Ikʼnal (died 7 November 604), was queen regnant of the Maya city-state of Palenque (ancient Lakamha). She acceded to the throne on 23 December 583 CE and ruled until her death in 604. (Note: These are the dates indicated on the Maya inscriptions in Mesoamerican Long Count calendar. Accession: 9.7.10.3.8 9 Lamat 1 Muwan; Death: 9.8.11.6.12 2 Eb 20 Keh, using the GMT+2 correlation and the proleptic Gregorian calendar.)

Yohl Ikʼnal holds a significant place in Mesoamerican chronology as the first definitively identified female ruler in recorded Maya history to have wielded full royal authority and borne the complete royal title of kʼuhul ajaw (divine lord/lady). Her reign occurred during a turbulent period in the Classic Period, marked by intense rivalry between the great Maya powers of Calakmul and Tikal, conflicts that would profoundly affect Palenque's political fortunes.

== Historical context ==
Palenque, known in antiquity as Lakamha ("Big Water") and the seat of the Bʼaakal polity ("Bone Place"), was one of the most important Maya city-states during the Classic Period (c. 250–900 CE). Located in the foothills of the Tumbalá Mountains in what is now Chiapas, the city controlled a fertile region with access to important trade routes connecting the Maya lowlands with the highlands and the Gulf of Mexico. By the time of Yohl Ikʼnal's reign, Palenque had established itself as a significant regional power.

The decades preceding Yohl Ikʼnal's reign were marked by relative stability. Kʼan Joy Chitam I ruled from approximately 529 to 565 CE, followed by Ahkal Mo' Nahb I (565–570 CE) and Kan Bahlam I (572–583 CE). However, the political landscape was also becoming dominated by superpowers Tikal and Calakmul, with Calakmul often expanding their sphere of influence through military conquest and the establishment of tributary relationships with defeated states.

=== Rulers of Palenque ===
Ruler	Reign dates (CE)	Relationship to Yohl Ikʼnal
Kʼukʼ Bahlam I	431–435	Ancestor (founder of dynasty)
Kʼan Joy Chitam I	529–565	Possible father
Ahkal Mo' Nahb I	565–570	Predecessor (uncle?)
Kan Bahlam I	572–583	Predecessor (possible father)
Yohl Ikʼnal	583–604	—
Ajen Yohl Mat	604–612	Son
Muwaan Mat	612	Unknown
Sak Kʼukʼ	612–615	Daughter or granddaughter
Kʼinich Janaab Pakal I	615–683	Grandson or great-grandson

== Life ==
=== Family and lineage ===
Yohl Ikʼnal's parentage is unclear due to ambiguities in the hieroglyphic records. She was a member of the royal Bʼaakal dynasty and a direct descendant of Kʼukʼ Bahlam I, founder of the Palenque dynasty. Most scholars believe Ikʼnal was either the daughter of Kan Bahlam I, her immediate predecessor, or Kʼan Joy Chitam I, who ruled earlier in the sixth century.

Yohl Ikʼnal's relationship with Janahb Pakal is also unclear. Inscriptions describe a parent-child relationship between them, but due to the vague and fragmented nature of the inscriptions, is unclear whether he was her husband or son. Some scholars believe Janahb Pakal was her consort, which is consistent with the practices of other Maya queens. Others argue that Janahb Pakal was her son, born during her reign.

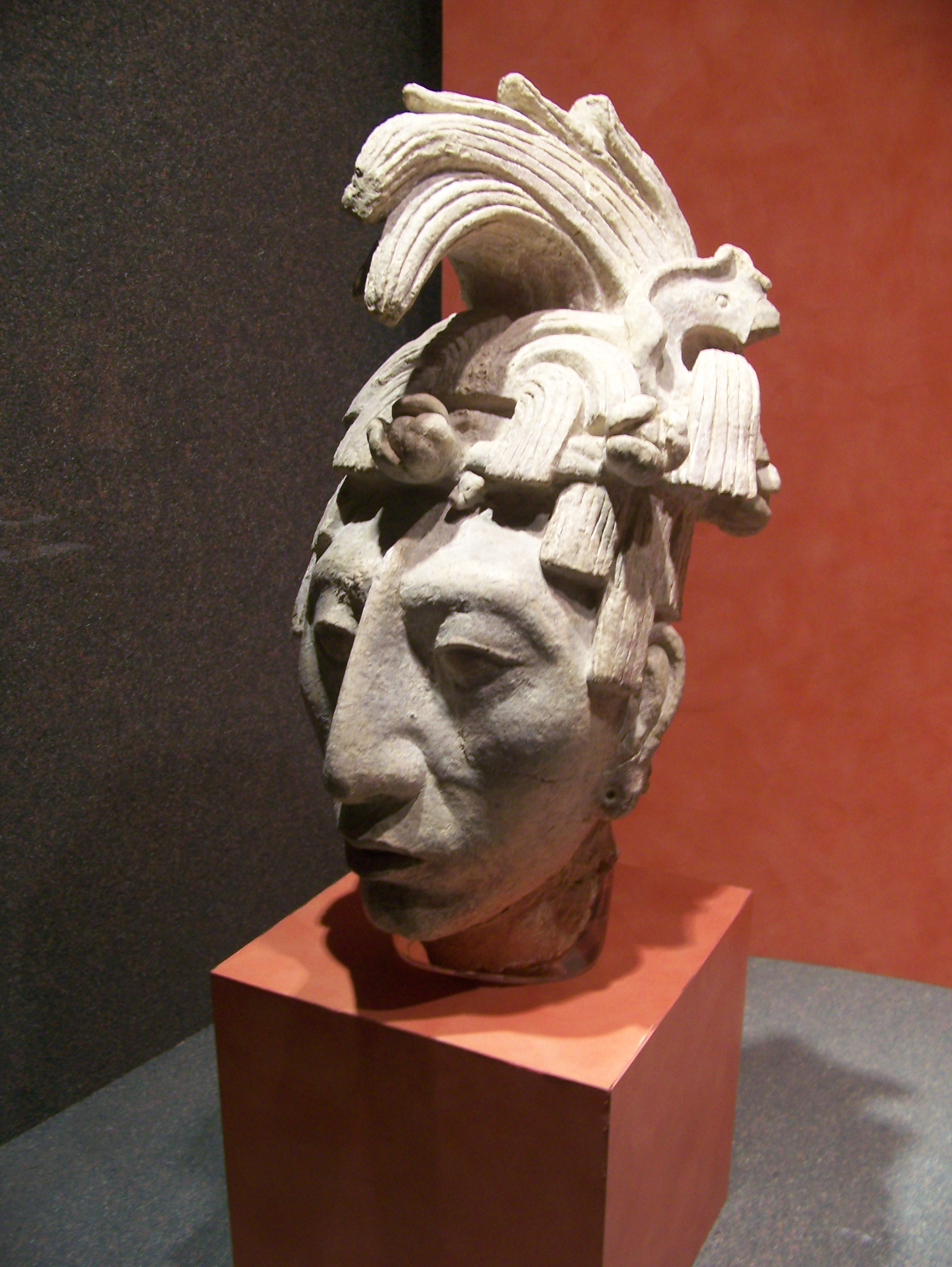
Kʼinich Janaab Pakal I (Pakal the Great), grandson or great-grandson of Yohl Ikʼnal

Ikʼnal descendents include:

- Ajen Yohl Mat (son) – succeeded Ikʼnal as ruler of Palenque in 604 CE
- Janahb Pakal (husband or son) – father to Lady Sak Kʼukʼ
- Lady Sak Kʼukʼ (daughter or granddaughter) – second female ruler of Palenque
- Kʼinich Janaab Pakal I (grandson or great-grandson) – son of Lady Sak Kʼukʼ who became Palenque's most celebrated ruler. Pakal emphasized his relation to Yohl Ikʼnal to legitimize his claim to the throne.

=== Accession to the throne ===
Classic Maya was patriarchal: power was almost invariably transmitted through the male line and the position of kʼuhul ajaw was overwhelmingly held by men. Because of this, Yohl Ikʼnal's accession to the throne on was both remarkable and unusual. She assumed the throne on 23 December 583 CE, the circumstances of which have not survived in precise detail. Several explanations have been proposed:

- Absence of male heirs: Palenque's previous ruler may have died without a son old enough to assume power. In such circumstances, the daughter of a king could serve as a conduit for royal authority until a male heir came of age.
- Political crisis: A disputed succession or external threat may have required the immediate investiture of whoever held the strongest claim to legitimacy, regardless of gender.
- Regent who became ruler: Yohl Ikʼnal may have initially served as regent for a young male who died, after which she assumed full royal authority.

Regardless of how she ascended, Yohl Ikʼnal is the first known female Maya ruler to hold the royal title of kʼuhul ajaw ("divine lord/lady"), indicating that she was considered the full embodiment of royal and sacred authority rather than a regent or consort.

=== Reign ===
==== Early years ====
The first sixteen years of Yohl Ikʼnal's reign appear to have been a period of relative stability and prosperity for Palenque, though the historical record for these years is limited. The city continued to function as an important regional center, maintaining its architectural programs and ritual activities.

During this period, the Maya world was experiencing significant political realignments as Calakmul under its kʼuhul ajaw sought to expand its network of subordinate allies and tributary states, often at the expense of Tikal and its allies. Palenque, located in the western Maya region, was somewhat removed from the main theaters of this conflict.

==== Calakmul control ====
On 23 April 599 CE, Palenque suffered a devastating military defeat at the hands of Calakmul, one of the two great Maya superpowers of the Classic Period. The hieroglyphic texts describe this attack using the term och kʼahkʼ ("fire-entering"), a standard Maya expression for the military conquest or sacking of a city, indicating that enemy forces entered and burned buildings in Palenque itself.

The attack was likely ordered by Scroll Serpent (Uneh Chan), the ruler of Calakmul at this time, though the military campaign may have been conducted by a subordinate or ally. Some inscriptions mention a lord of Santa Elena as the direct aggressor, suggesting that Calakmul may have used a dependent polity to carry out the attack while claiming overall credit for the victory.

The exact nature and extent of the damage inflicted on Palenque is not fully recorded, but the very survival of the polity suggests that the defeat, while significant, did not result in the complete destruction of the city or the extinction of its ruling dynasty. Yohl Ikʼnal herself survived the attack and continued to rule for another five years, suggesting that Calakmul's goal was to subordinate rather than destroy the Palenque polity. The terms of Palenque's submission likely included the payment of tribute to the ajaw of Calakmul as well as political deference and participation in Calakmul's diplomatic network. This practice was common in Classic Maya warfare, as victorious kings sought to expand their networks while extracting economic resources and political allegiance.

There are indications in the hieroglyphic record that either Yohl Ikʼnal in the final years of her reign or her successor Ajen Yohl Mat successfully rebelled against Calakmul's dominance at some point before 611 CE.

==== Final years ====
Despite the military defeat and probable tributary status, Yohl Ikʼnal continued to rule Palenque until her death on 7 November 604 CE. The tasks facing Yohl Ikʼnal during these final years would have included managing the tributary relationship with Calakmul, overseeing reconstruction of damaged buildings, maintaining the functions of Maya kingship, and ensuring an orderly succession. Her succession by Ajen Yohl Mat, apparently her son, suggests that she was successful in preserving the dynastic line.

=== Death and burial ===
Yohl Ikʼnal died on 7 November 604 CE. The Maya date recorded in the Mesoamerican Long Count calendar is 9.8.11.6.12 2 Eb 20 Keh. She reigned for twenty-one years, making her one of the longer-reigning rulers in Palenque's dynastic history to that point. The cause of her death was not recorded in the surviving inscriptions, and while natural causes seem the most likely explanation, this remains speculative.

Archaeologist Merle Greene Robertson has suggested that a vaulted tomb discovered beneath Temple 20 at Palenque may be Yohl Ikʼnal's final resting place. Temple 20, part of the temple group located near the Temple of the Inscriptions, was the subject of archaeological investigation that revealed an intact burial chamber beneath its floor. The attribution of this tomb to Yohl Ikʼnal is based on several factors:

- The location in a temple close to the Temple of the Inscriptions, suggesting a royal burial of high status.
- The dating of the ceramics and architectural style to the appropriate time period (early seventh century CE).
- The presence of elaborate burial goods consistent with royal status.
- The relatively small size of the skeletal remains, possibly indicating a female.

Other scholars have proposed alternative identifications for the Temple 20 burial.

== Commemoration and legacy ==
The most significant surviving commemorations of Yohl Ikʼnal are within the Temple of the Inscriptions, in the tomb of her grandson or great-grandson Kʼinich Janaab Pakal I. Ikʼnal is depicted twice on Pakal's sarcophagus, which shows his ancestors emerging from the earth as fruit trees, emphasizing the vitality of the royal lineage across generations. Ikʼnal was also sculpted amongst portraits of other ancestors on the tomb's walls.

Yohl Ikʼnal is mentioned in several inscriptions at Palenque, most notably in the Palace Tablet at the Palace at Palenque, in three hieroglyphic panels at the Temple of the Inscriptions, and in additional panels at Temple 17.

=== In popular culture ===
Yohl Ikʼnal is a character in the Magic Tree House book Shadow of the Shark, which details a fictional account of how she became ruler of Palenque.

== See also ==
- Women rulers in Maya society

== Footnotes ==
Regnal titles
Preceded by Kan Bahlam I	Queen of Palenque; 23 December 583 – 7 November 604	Succeeded by Ajen Yohl Mat
