= Temple 20 =

Mayan pyramidal building

Temple 20 (or Temple XX) is a pyramidal building, dated to between AD 430 and 600 (Early Classic period), located at the Maya city of Palenque in the state of Chiapas in southern Mexico with a funerary chamber that contains remains of a high ranking character. Archaeologist Merle Greene Robertson has suggested that the vaulted tomb under Temple 20 is that of Queen Ix Yohl Ik'nal.

== Exploration ==
In 1999 archeologists discovered a tomb inside Temple 20, but any attempt of penetration could lead to damage, due to the uncertain structural state of the pyramid built on top of it.

A small camcorder (4 by 6 centimetres (1.6 by 2.4 in)), lowered to the depth of 5 metres (16 ft) through a 15 centimetres (5.9 in) wide hole in an upper floor of the pyramid in April 2011, revealed murals of nine human figures outlined in black against the blood-red background. There was no sarcophagus, it is probable that the skeleton lies on the slabs of the floor.

The INAH Council of Archaeology determined that the pyramidal base must be stabilized before exploration.

== Restoration ==
Temple 20 was restored by specialists from the National Institute of Anthropology and History (INAH) in 2010.

== See also ==
- Djedi Project
