= Kʼinich Kan Bahlam II =

- Ajaw
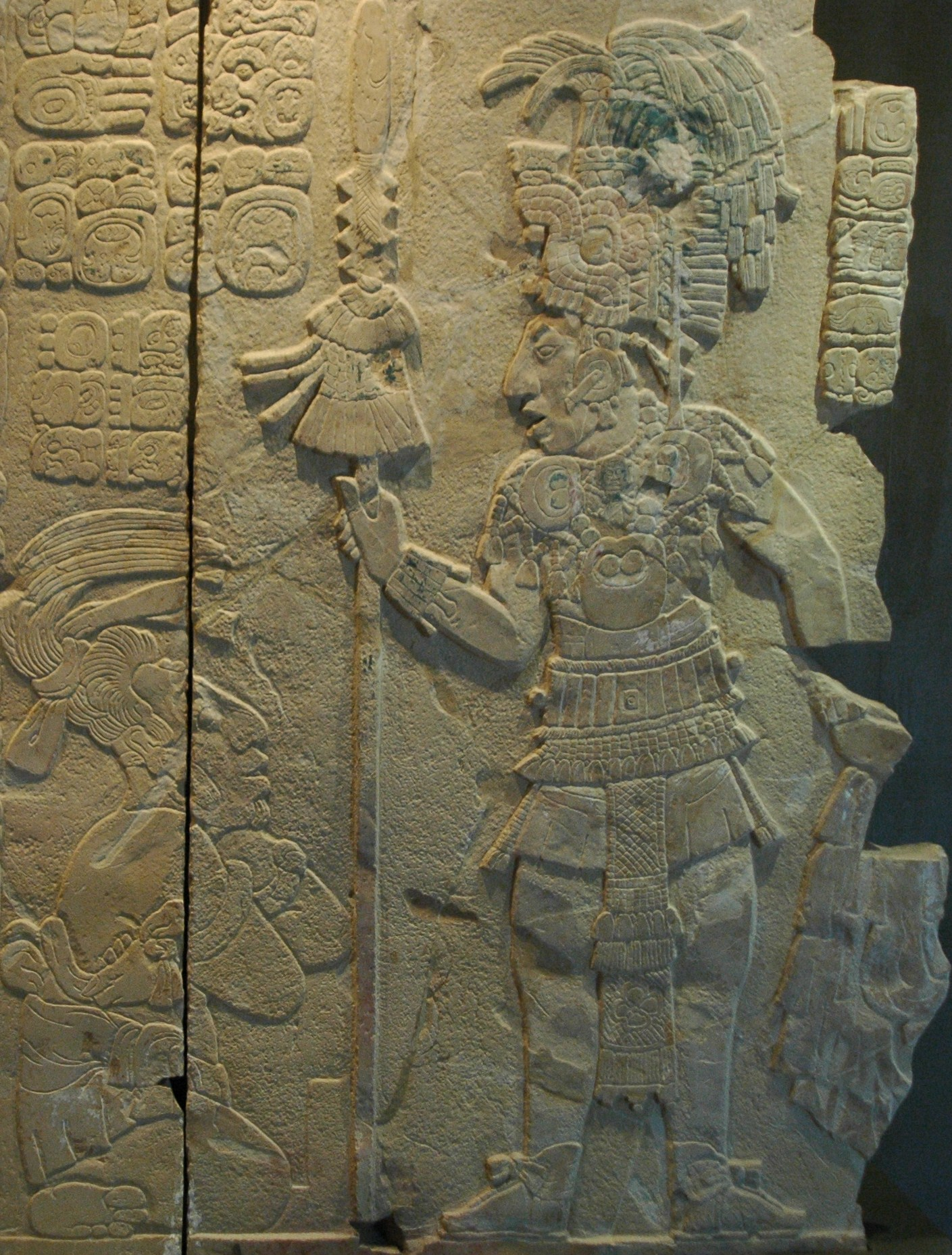
- Kʼinich Kan Bahlam II on tablet from the Temple XVII.

King of Palenque
- Reign: 10 January 684 – 20 February 702
- Predecessor: Kʼinich Janaabʼ Pakal
- Successor: Kʼinich Kʼan Joy Chitam II
- Born: 23 May 635; Palenque
- Died: 20 February 702 (aged 66); Palenque
- Burial: Palenque
- Father: Kʼinich Janaabʼ Pakal
- Mother: Lady Tzʼakbu Ajaw of Tortuguero
- Religion: Maya religion

Kʼinich Kan Bahlam II (Note: The ruler's name, when transcribed is KʼINICH KAN[BAHLAM]-ma, translated "Radiant Snake Jaguar", Martin & Grube 2008, p. 168.) (Mayan pronunciation: [kʼihniʧ kan ɓahlam]), also known as Chan Bahlum II, (May 23, 635 – February 20, 702) was ajaw of the Maya city-state of Palenque, in what is now the state of Chiapas, Mexico. He acceded to the throne in January, 684, several months after the death of his father and predecessor, Kʼinich Janaabʼ Pakal, and ruled until his death. (Note: These are the dates indicated on the Maya inscriptions in Mesoamerican Long Count calendar, Born: 9.10.2.6.6 2 Kimi 19 Sotzʼ, Acceded: 9.12.11.12.10 8 Ok 3 Kʼayab and Died: 9.13.10.1.5 6 Chikchan 3 Pop, Martin & Grube 2008, p. 168.)

== Biography ==
He continued the ambitious project of adorning Palenque with fine art and architecture begun by his father; his most important addition to the city of Palenque was the Temple of the Cross which is the center piece of the Temple of the Cross Complex. He was succeeded by his younger brother, Kʼinich Kʼan Joy Chitam II, another brother was probably Tiwol Chan Mat. The monuments and text associated with Kʼinich Kan Bahlam II are: Tablets and Alfardas of the Temples of the Cross, Sun and Foliated Cross; tablets and facade of the Temple of the Inscriptions; Temple 17 Panel; Death's Head; Jonuta Panel; Temple of the Cross Stela.

== Footnotes ==
Regnal titles
Preceded by Kʼinich Janaabʼ Pakal	Ajaw of Palenque; January, 684 – February, 702	Succeeded by Kʼinich Kʼan Joy Chitam II
