= Alberto Ruz Lhuillier =

Mexican archaeologist (1906–1979)

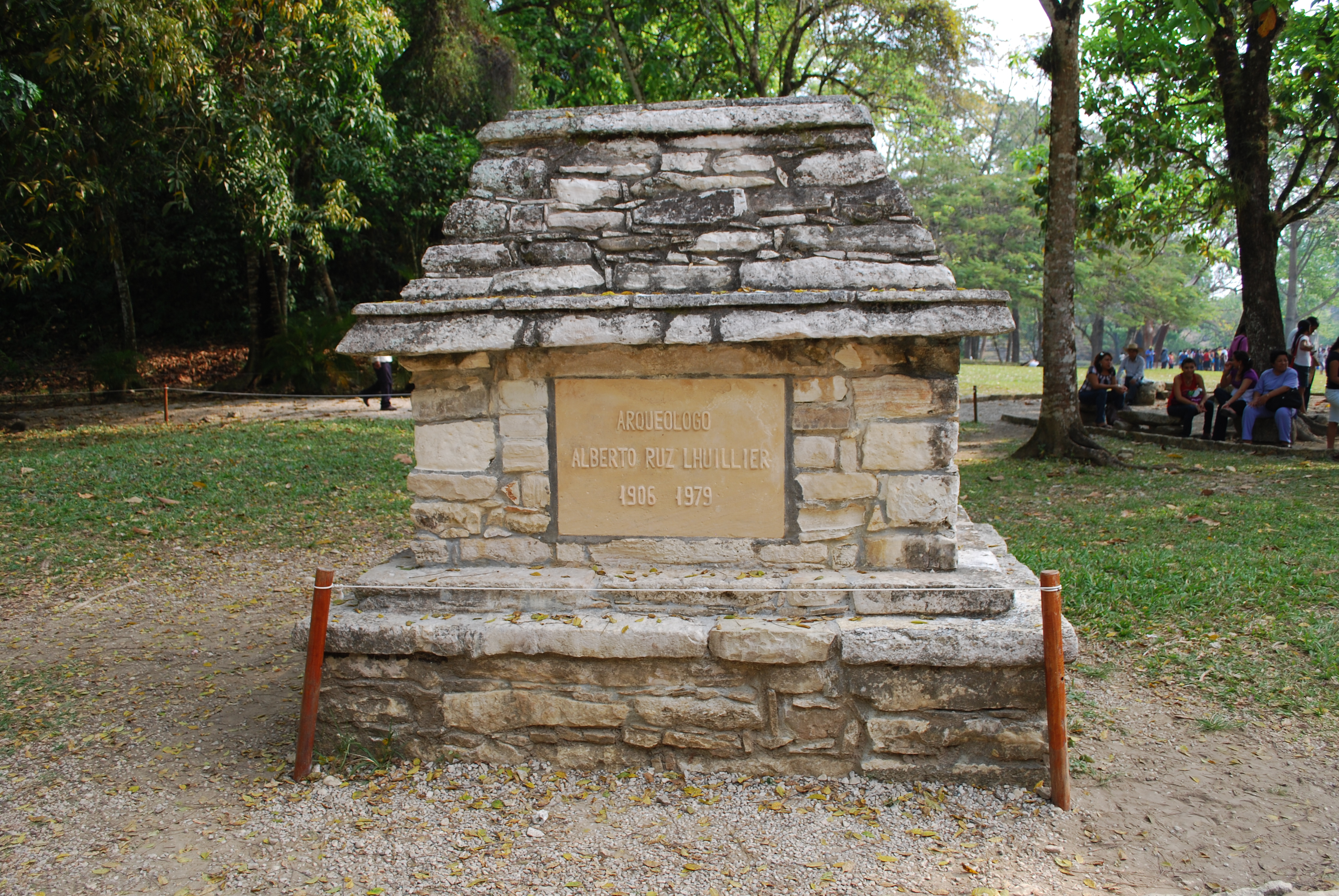
- Born: 27 January 1906; Paris, France
- Died: 25 August 1979 (aged 73); Montreal, Quebec, Canada
- Occupation: archaeologist

Alberto Ruz Lhuillier (27 January 1906 – 25 August 1979) was a Mexican archaeologist. He specialized in pre-Columbian Mesoamerican archaeology and is well known for leading the National Institute of Anthropology and History (INAH) excavations at the Maya site of Palenque, where he found the tomb of the Maya ruler, Pakal. Ruz Lhuillier is sometimes referred to as the "Hitchcock of Archaeology".

== Early life ==
Ruz Lhuillier was born in Paris, France, to a Cuban father and a French mother. He went to college in Havana where he learned about the impact of American interference in Cuban affairs and he became deeply involved in the socialist revolution to oust the current government. These early student life experiences exposed him to other students who espoused the theories and ideas of Karl Marx. Later Ruz would use some of these theories to explain the development and fall of ancient Maya civilization. He moved to Mexico in 1936, later acquiring Mexican citizenship.

== Career ==
After the unexpected death of Miguel Ángel Fernández in 1945, Ruz Lhuillier took charge of the INAH's investigations at Palenque. While he served as the INAH's southern Director of Pre-Hispanic Monuments, Ruz Lhuillier excavated much of the city and restored and conserved such edifices as the Palace. In 1948, he discovered the entrance to the tomb of the Maya ruler, K'inich Janaab' Pakal, hidden beneath the Temple of the Inscriptions. After four seasons of clearing the rubble-filled stairway, he found Pakal's sarcophagus and body. Ruz Lhuillier's team also found the Tablet of the Palace, which served as the back to a throne, and the Tablet of the Slaves which depicts a cahal amid bound captives. Ruz Lhuillier continued working at the site until 1958.

Ruz Lhuillier died in Montreal, Quebec, Canada on 25 August 1979. Several of his books on the Maya, including Los Antiguos Mayas, were published posthumously.

Honoring his works, the Mexican Government permits that his remains rest in peace in front of the Necropolis that was discovered by him at the Maya site of Palenque, Chiapas.

== Works ==
- Los Antiguos Mayas, Una Antologia (English: The Ancient Maya: An Anthology) - (January 1981)
- El Pueblo Maya (English: The Maya People) - (January 1982)
- Frente Al Pasado De Los Mayas (English: Facing the Past of the Maya) - (January 1987)
- El Templo De Las Inscripciones, Palenque (English: The Temple of the Inscriptions) - (January 1992)
- Palenque 1947-1958 - (January 2007)
