= Kʼinich Kʼan Joy Chitam II =

Ajaw of Palenque of 702 to 721

- Ajaw
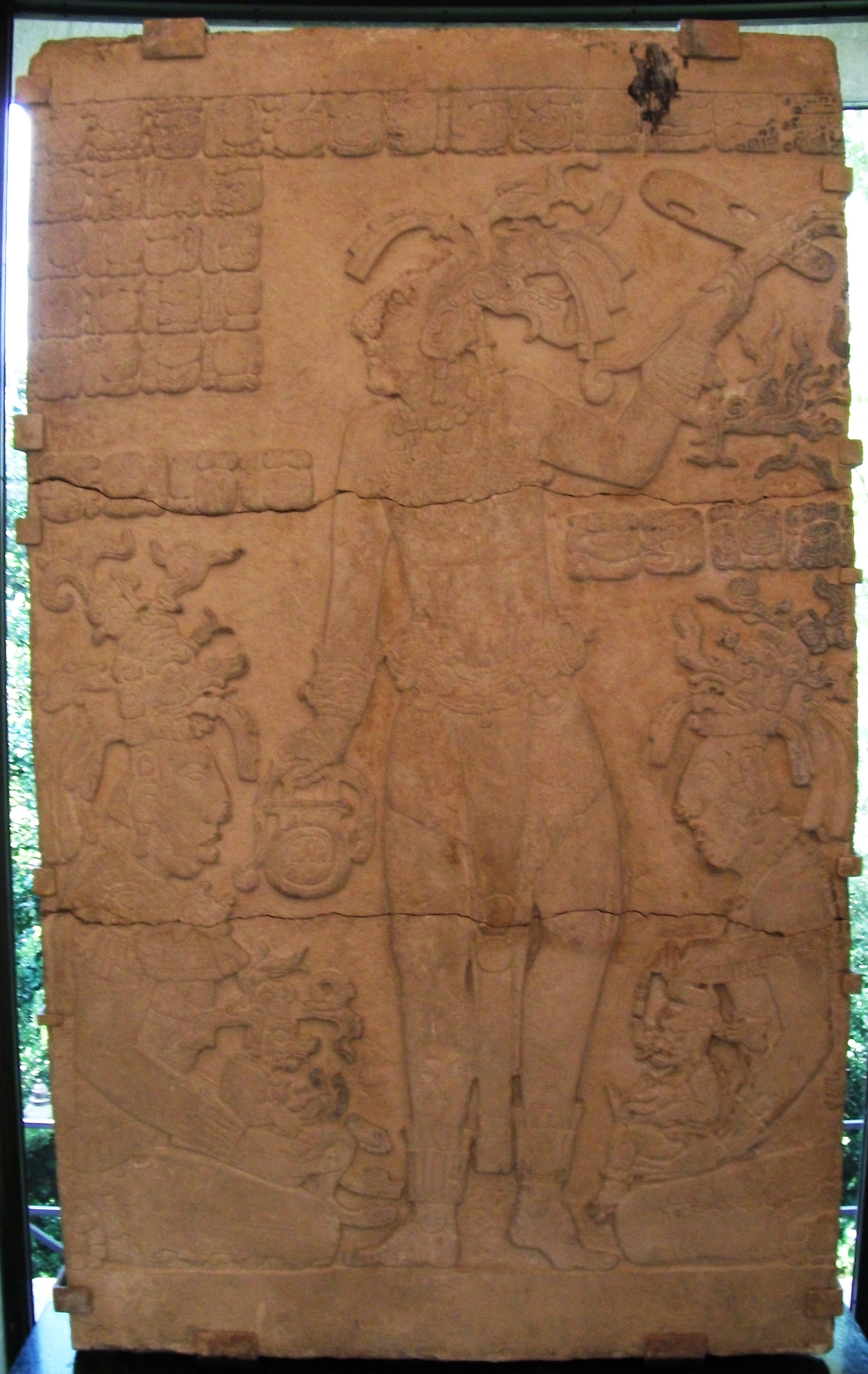
- Kʼinich Kʼan Joy Chitam II's portrait on a lintel

King of Palenque
- Reign: 28 May 702 – 711/21?
- Predecessor: Kʼinich Kan Bahlam II
- Successor: Kʼinich Ahkal Moʼ Nahb III
- Born: 31 October 644; Palenque
- Died: 721 (aged 76–77); Palenque
- Father: Kʼinich Janaab Pakal I
- Mother: Lady Tzʼakbu Ajaw of Tortuguero
- Religion: Maya religion

Kʼinich Kʼan Joy Chitam II, (Note: The ruler's name, when transcribed is KʼINICH KʼAN-na-JOY[CHITAM]-ma, translated "Precious/Yellow Tied Peccary".) also known as Kan Xul II and Kʼan Hokʼ Chitam On II, (October 31, 644 – c.721), was an ajaw of the Maya city of Palenque. He took the throne on May 28, 702 (9.13.10.6.8), reigning until c.721. (Note: These are the dates indicated on the Maya inscriptions in Mesoamerican Long Count calendar, Born: 9.10.11.17.0 11 Ahaw 8 Mak and Acceded: 9.13.10.6.8 5 Lamat 6 Xul.) He succeeded his elder brother Kʼinich Kan Bahlam II. Their father was Kʼinich Janaab Pakal I ("Pacal the Great"), who had ruled for 68 years, and their mother was Lady Tzʼakbu Ajaw. His possible brother could be Tiwol Chan Mat. Kʼinich Kʼan Joy Chitam apparently reigned for about nine years. He was captured by the Toniná in 711 and was possibly executed by their leader, Kʼinich Baaknal Chaak or was later restored to his kingship. He was succeeded in late 721 by Kʼinich Ahkal Moʼ Nahb III.

== Sources ==
Regnal titles
Preceded by Kʼinich Kan Bahlam II	Ajaw of Palenque; May 30, 702–711	Succeeded by Kʼinich Ahkal Moʼ Nahb III
