= Sak Kʼukʼ =

- Ajaw
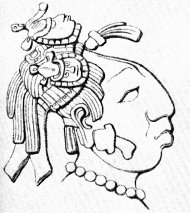
- Sak Kʼukʼ's portrait in a lintel of 615

Queen of Palenque
- Reign: 19 October 612 – 615 (abdicated)
- Predecessor: Ajen Yohl Mat
- Successor: Kʼinich Janaab Pakal I
- Born: Palenque
- Died: 12 September 640; Palenque
- Spouse: Kʼan Moʼ Hix
- Issue: Ajen Yohl Mat (possibly); Kʼinich Janaab Pakal I
- Father: Janahb Pakal (possibly)
- Mother: Yohl Ikʼnal
- Religion: Maya religion

Sak Kʼukʼ (Note: The ruler's name, when transcribed is ?-[MUWA꞉N]MAT.) also known as Muwaan Mat, Lady Sak Kʼukʼ and Lady Beastie (died 640), was queen of the Maya city-state of Palenque. She acceded to the throne in October, 612 and ruled until 615. (Note: These are the dates indicated on the Maya inscriptions in Mesoamerican Long Count calendar, Acceded: 9.8.19.7.18 9 Etzʼnab 6 Keh.)

== Biography ==
Her father was Janahb Pakal and her mother was Yohl Ikʼnal or unknown. As Janaab Pakal seems to have had no male heirs, she ascended to the throne on 19 October 612, a few months after her father's death. After his maturity, her son Kʼinich Janaab Pakal I succeeded her as ruler on 9.9.2.4.8 5 Lamat 1 Mol. She seems to have continued to wield considerable influence over Palenque in the early decades of her son's reign. For example, Sak Kʼukʼ is recorded on Pakal's sarcophagus lid as the ruler who celebrated the sealing of the Kʼatun on 9.10.0.0.0 (25 January 633 AD). She was probably mother of Ajen Yohl Mat.

== Sources ==
Regnal titles
Preceded by Janahb Pakal (position uncertain) or Ajen Yohl Mat	Queen of Palenque; October 19, 612 – 615	Succeeded by Kʼinich Janaab Pakal I
