= Kʼinich Janaabʼ Pakal =

Ajaw of Palenque from 615 to 683

Kʼinich Janaab Pakal I
- Kʼuhul Baakel Ajaw (Divine Lord of Palenque)
- Kʼinich Janaab Pakal's contemporary portrait on occasion of ascension from Oval Palace Tablet, dated to 654

King of Palenque
- Reign: 27 July 615 – 29 August 683
- Coronation: 27 July 615
- Predecessor: Sak Kʼukʼ
- Successor: Kʼinich Kan Bahlam II
- Born: 24 March 603 (Note: In the Maya calendar: born 9.8.9.13.0, 8 Ajaw 13 Pop; died 9.12.11.5.18, 6 Etzʼnab 11 Yax (Tiesler & Cucina 2004, p. 40).); Palenque (now in Chiapas, Mexico)
- Died: 29 August 683 (aged 80); Palenque
- Burial: Temple of the Inscriptions, Palenque
- Spouse: Lady Tzʼakbu Ajaw of Uxteʼkʼuh
- Issue: Kʼinich Kan Bahlam II; Kʼinich Kʼan Joy Chitam II; Tiwol Chan Mat (probable)
- Father: Kʼan Moʼ Hix
- Mother: Sak Kʼukʼ
- Religion: Maya religion

Kʼinich Janaab Pakal I (Mayan pronunciation: [kʼihniʧ χanaːɓ pakal]), also known as Pacal or Pacal the Great (24 March 603 – 29 August 683), was ajaw of the Maya city-state of Palenque in the Late Classic period of pre-Columbian Mesoamerican chronology. He acceded to the throne in July 615 and ruled until his death. Pakal reigned 68 years (Note: In the Maya calendar: acceded 9.9.2.4.8, 5 Lamat 1 Mol; died 9.12.11.5.18, 6 Etzʼnab 11 Yax (Martin & Grube 2008, p. 162).)—the fifth-longest verified regnal period of millennium, (Note: Pakal's record was surpassed in June 1711, by Louis XIV of France; Louis's record still stands as of today.) and the second-longest reign of any monarch in the history of the Americas. He took the throne at age 12. During his long rule, Pakal was responsible for the construction or extension of some of Palenque's most notable surviving inscriptions and monumental architecture. He is perhaps best known in popular culture for his depiction on the carved lid of his sarcophagus, which has become the subject of pseudoarchaeological speculations.

== Name ==

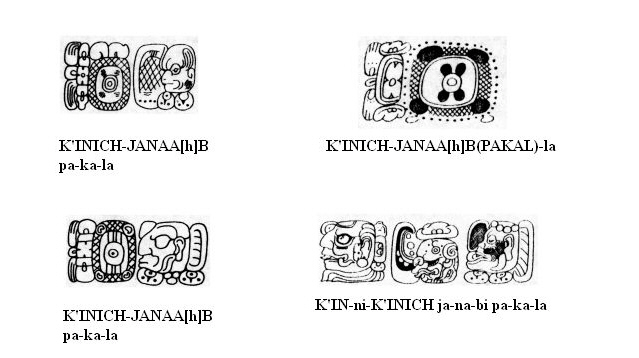
Kʼinich Janaab Pakal I's glyphs.

Pakal's full name, Kʼinich Janaab Pakal ("Radiant Corn-Flower (?) Shield"), is rendered in Classic Maya as KʼINICH-JANA꞉B-PAKAL-la, KʼINICH-JANA꞉B-pa-ka-la, or KʼINICH-ja-na-bi-pa-ka-la. Before his name was securely deciphered from extant Maya inscriptions, Pakal had been known by various nicknames and approximations, including Sun Shield and 8 Ahau.

In modern sources Pakal's name is also sometimes appended with a regnal number, (Note: Maya rulership titles and name glyphs themselves do not use regnal numbers; they are a convenience only of modern scholars.) to distinguish him from other rulers with this name who either preceded or followed him in the dynastic lineage of Palenque. Confusingly, he has at times been referred to as either "Pakal I" or "Pakal II". Reference to him as Pakal II alludes to his maternal grandfather (died c. 612), who also bore the name Janahb Pakal. However, although his grandfather was a personage of ajaw ranking, he does not himself appear to have been a king. When instead the name Pakal I is used, this serves to distinguish him from two later known successors to the American rulership, Kʼinich Janaab Pakal II (ruled c. 742) and Janaab Pakal III, the last-known Palenque ruler (ruled c. 799).

== Early life ==
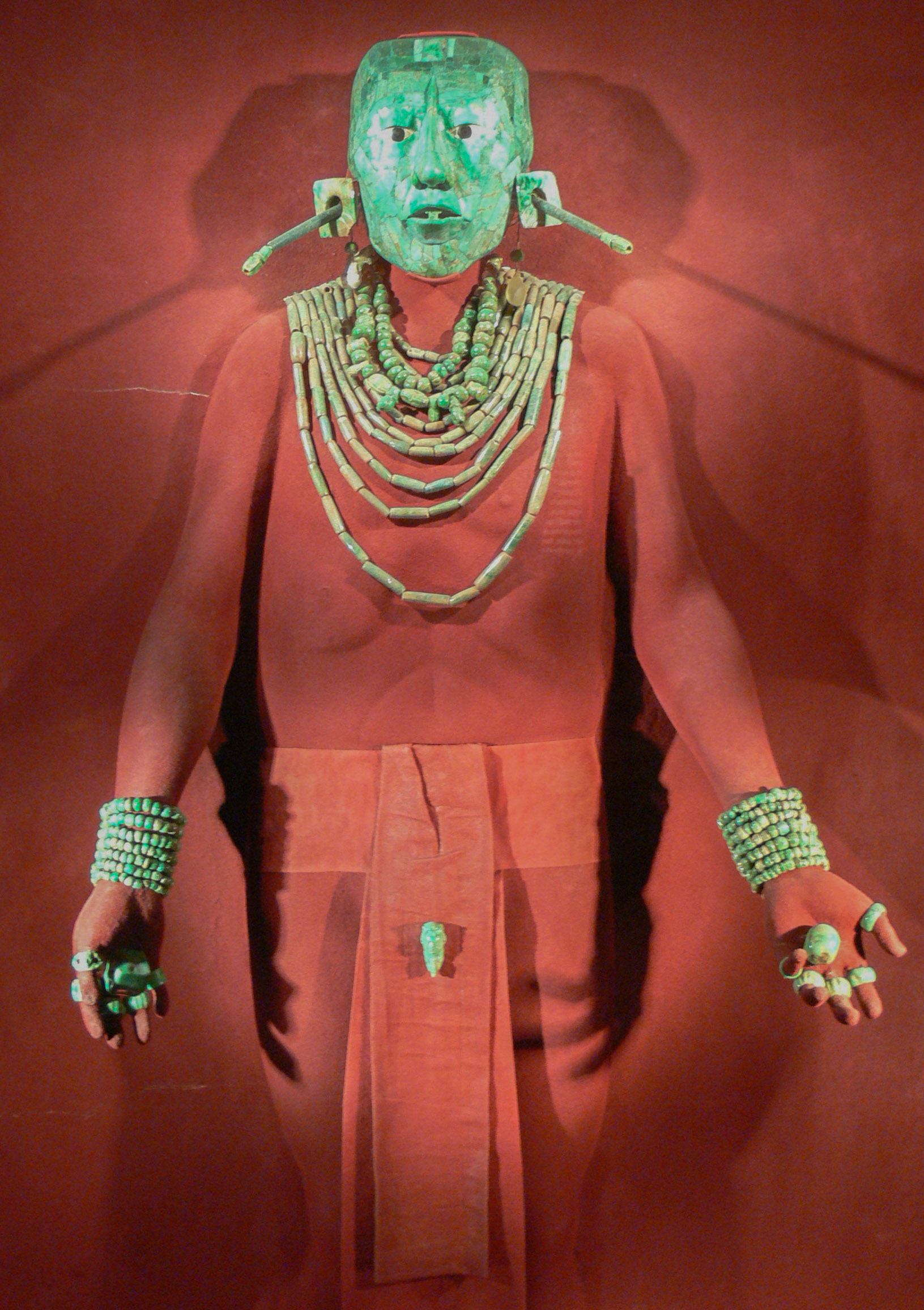
Mounted funerary jewelry of Kʼinich Janaab Pakal I.

Kʼinich Janaab Pakal was a Palenque native, born on 9.8.9.13.0 (March 603) to Lady Sak Kʼukʼ of the ruling Palenque dynasty and her husband Kʼan Moʼ Hix.

Pakal's long birth came during a particularly turbulent time in Palenque's history. Palenque had been sacked by the powerful Maya state of Calakmul just four years earlier, and another catastrophic attack was led by Calakmul ajaw Scroll Serpent during Pakal's early childhood in 611. The deaths the following year of both the ruling Palenque ajaw Ajen Yohl Mat and his heir Janahb Pakal (Pakal's maternal grandfather and namesake) triggered a crisis of succession; eventually Pakal ascended to the rulership of Palenque on 9.9.2.4.8 (July 615), at the age of twelve, after an interim regency by his mother Lady Sak Kʼukʼ.

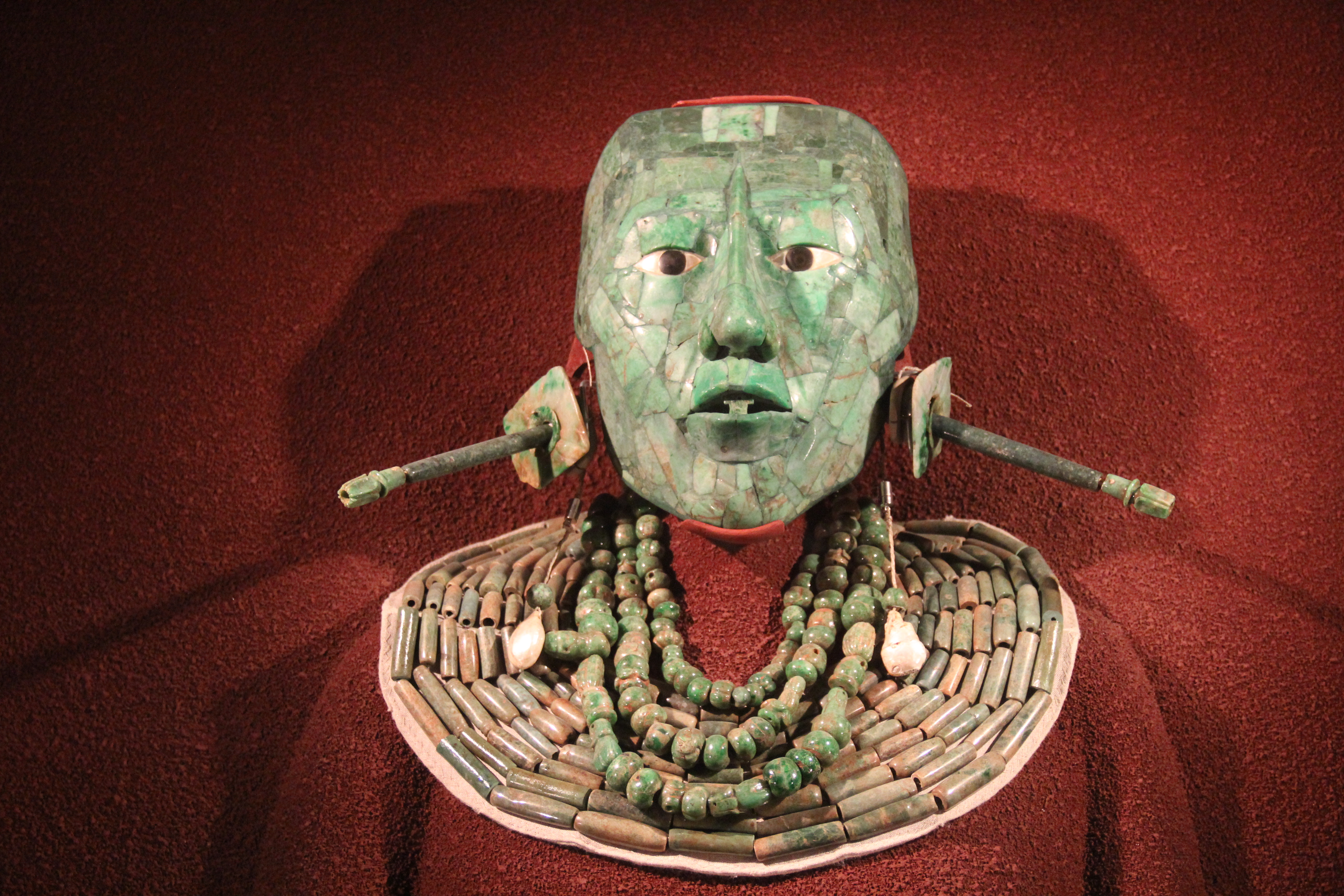
Jade mask of Janaab Pakal

== Physical appearance ==
Pakal's maximum living stature, taken in situ, was calculated at 163 cm. A combined estimate from his left tibia and right humerus is 161 cm. This stature falls within the established male range among the Prehispanic Maya of 160 cm (;) and slightly above the average of Palenque’s male population. His head displayed pronounced artificial cranial elongation and reclination (pseudo-annular, tabular oblique type). Severe head wrapping and splinting caused his face to grow forward and outward and result in outthrusting facial features. Janaab’ Pakal carried filed teeth and to a degree which does not echo his portraiture. His two central upper incisors show discrete notches at their lateral edges to make an “ik’”-like ’T’ shape, the lateral incisors slightly flattened. This was done and shaped deliberately to mimic the Ik’ glyph which means “wind” or “breath” (which is life force symbolically in Mayan culture). This is a clear understatement of the pronounced central dental bridge that dominates his facial portraiture and most noticeably that of his jadeite mask.

== Reign ==
Pakal expanded Palenque's power in the western part of the Maya states and initiated a building program at his capital that produced some of Maya civilization's finest art and architecture. On 9.9.13.0.7 (March 626), he married Ix Tzʼakbu Ajaw, a descendant of the former ruling Toktahn dynasty from Palenque's satellite settlement of Uxteʼkʼuh; during their long marriage, they had at least two sons—Kan Bahlam (b. 635) and Kʼan Joy Chitam (b. 644)—and probably a third, Tiwol Chan Mat (b. 648).

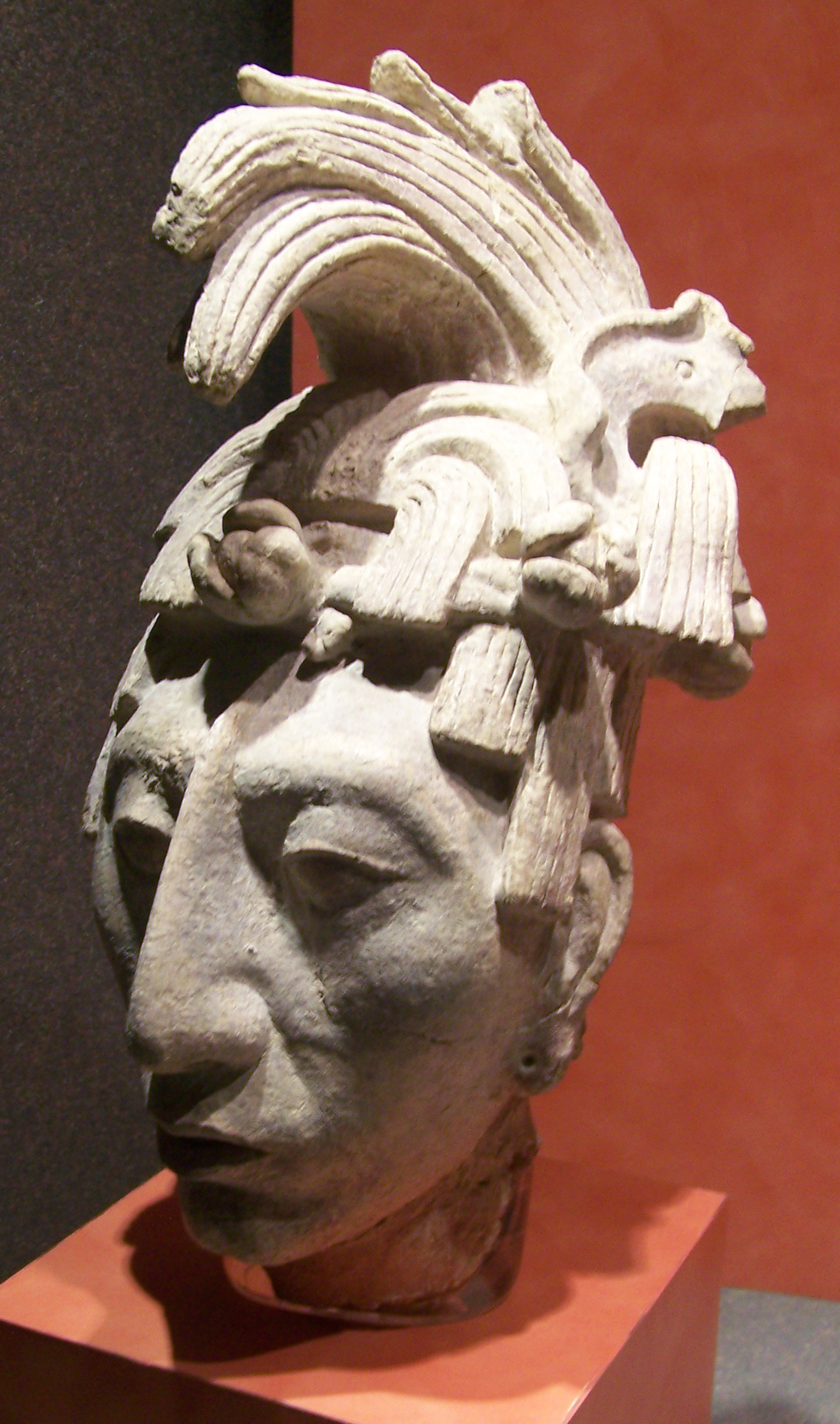

In 628, one of Pakal's officials (aj kʼuhuun), was captured by Piedras Negras. Six days later Nuun Ujol Chaak, ajaw of Santa Elena, was captured and taken to Palenque. Santa Elena became a tributary of Palenque. Having been appointed ajaw at the age of twelve, Pakal's mother was a regent to him. Over the years she slowly ceded power until she died in September 640. In 659 Pakal captured six prisoners; one of them, Ahiin Chan Ahk, was from Pipaʼ, generally associated with Pomona. Another lord of Pipaʼ was slain by Pakal in 663; at this time he also captured six people from Santa Elena.

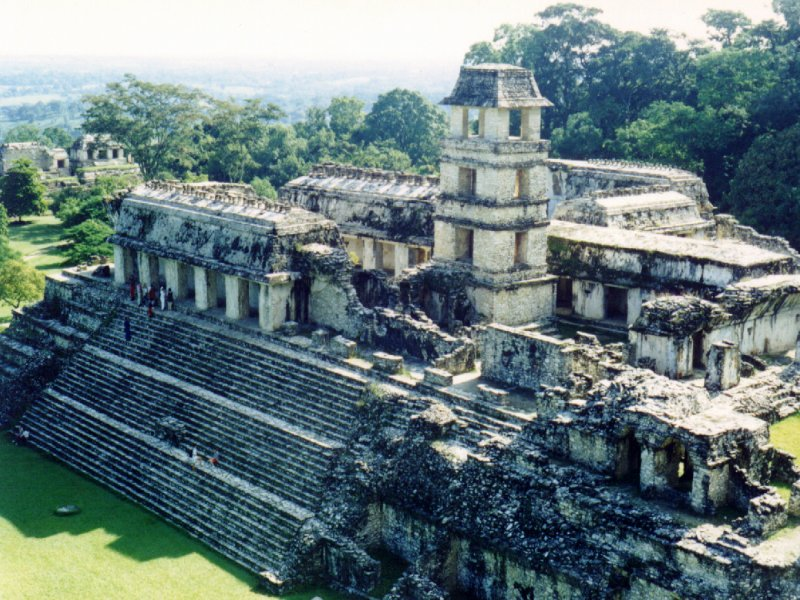
The Palace of Palenque.

In 647, at the age of 44, Pakal began his first construction project, but the temple today called El Olvidado (The Forgotten) in Spanish due to its distance from Lakamhaʼ. Of all Pakal's construction projects, perhaps the most accomplished is the Palace of Palenque. The building was already in existence, but Pakal enlarged it greatly by adding monument rooms onto the old level of the building. He then constructed Building E, called Sak Nuk Naah "White Skin House" in Classic Maya for its white coat of paint rather than the red used elsewhere in the palace. The east court of the palace is a ceremonial area marking military triumphs. Houses B and C were built in 661 and house A in 668. House A is covered with frescos of prisoners captured in 662. The monuments and text associated with Pakal are: Oval Palace Tablet, Hieroglyphic Stairway, House C texts, Subterranean Thrones and Tableritos, Olvidado piers and sarcophagus texts.

Pakal was widowed when Tzʼakbu Ajaw, his wife of 47 years, died on 9.12.0.6.18 (November 672). Eight years later, Pakal also saw the death of Tiwol Chan Mat (his third son), and presided over his burial ceremony.

== Death and burial ==
Pakal died on 9.12.11.5.18 (August 683), at the age of 80, having ruled Palenque for 68 years and 33 days.

After his death, Pakal was deified as one of the patron gods of Palenque. He was survived at least by his two sons Kan Bahlam and Kʼan Joy Chitam—each of whom subsequently also became Palenque's kʼuhul ajaw in his own right—and two grandsons, Ahkal Moʼ Nahb (successor of Kʼinich Kʼan Joy Chitam II as kʼuhul ajaw of Palenque) and Janaab Ajaw, a royal official inaugurated under the reign of Kʼinich Kʼan Joy Chitam II.

Although Janaab Pakal died at the end of the seventh century, their peers seem to have believed that he lived on after his celestial apotheosis. After triumphing over the forces of the underworld, now he are seen installed at an otherworldly place, identified perhaps with the celestial paradise of the solar gods. Decades after his tomb had been sealed, Pakal was still taking artistic decisions, for the sculptor who carved the Tablet of the 96 Glyphs (K6-K7) claims to have conceived the work just as it had been commissioned by the revered ancestor (ukob’ow ukabjiiy Hoˀ Winikhaab Ajaw), K'ihnich Janaab’ Pakal. The ethereal graphemes now grasp his royal corporeity as a visible medium-body, while the hieroglyphic nominal clauses of Pakal and his descendants turn into substitute bodies. On the Temple XXI panel, the folds of Pakal’s skin and the hardened lines of his face represent an aged ruler, who in the year AD 736, half a century after his biological death, still hands ritual instruments over to his grandson. In these ancient Maya bodyscapes, Pakal appears to transit freely through space-time. His soul merges with those of the mythical ruler Ch'a, who supposedly ruled around 967 BC, and equally joins with Ukokan Chan, a legendary lord who in 251 BC initiated the veneration of Palenque’s ancestral gods.

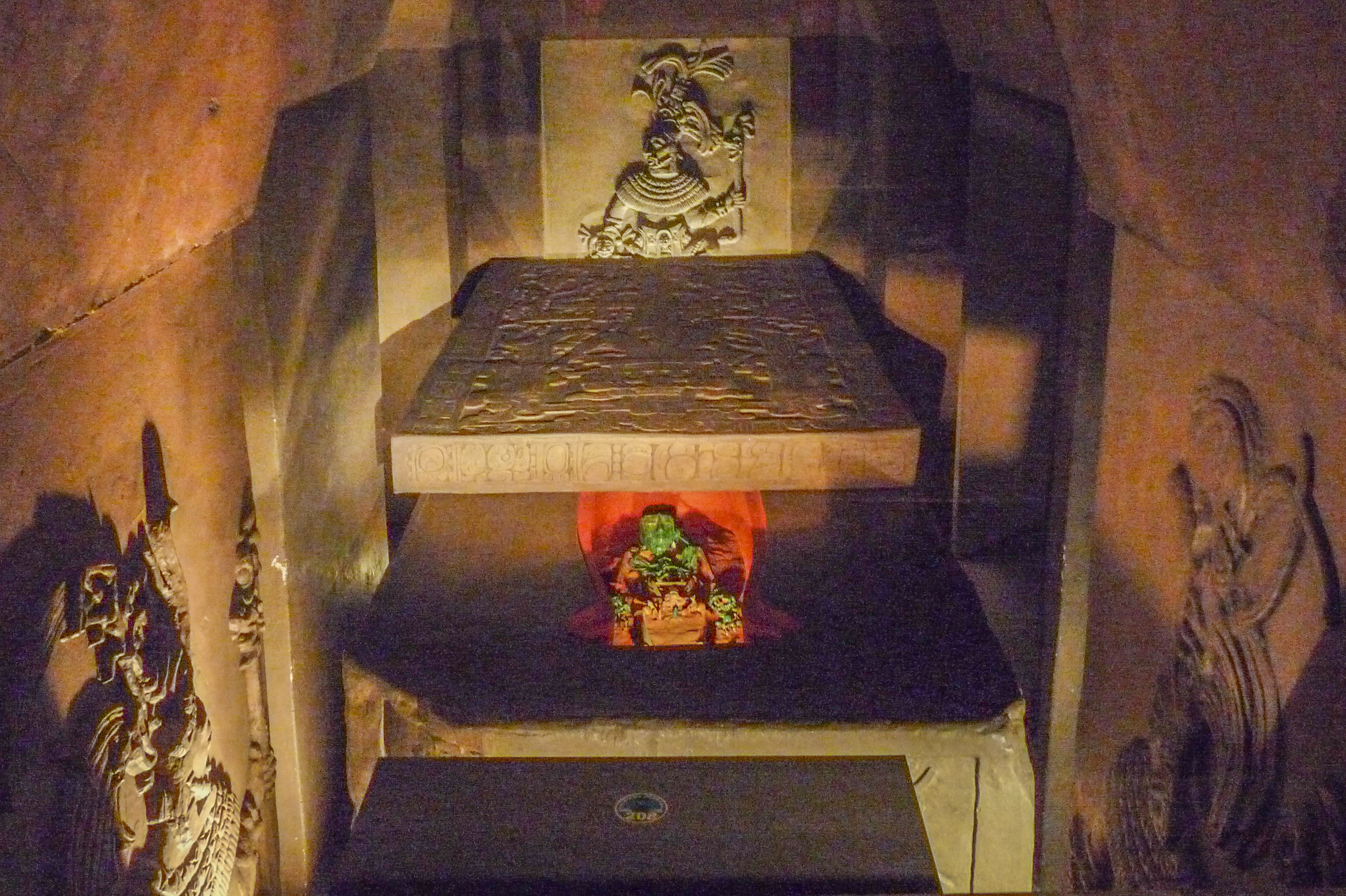
A reconstruction of Pakal's tomb in the Museo Nacional de Antropología.

Pakal was buried in a colossal sarcophagus within the largest of Palenque's stepped pyramid structures, the building called Bʼolon Yej Teʼ Naah ("House of the Nine Sharpened Spears") in Classic Maya and now known as the Temple of the Inscriptions. Though Palenque had been examined by archaeologists before, the secret to opening his tomb—closed off by a stone slab with stone plugs in the holes, which had until then escaped the attention of archaeologists—was discovered by Mexican archaeologist Alberto Ruz Lhuillier in 1948. It took four years to clear the rubble from the stairway leading down to Pakal's tomb, but it was finally uncovered in 1952. His skeletal remains were still lying in his sarcophagus, wearing a jade mask and bead necklaces, surrounded by sculptures and stucco reliefs depicting the ruler's transition to divinity and figures from Maya mythology. Traces of pigment show that these were once colorfully painted, common of many Maya sculptures at the time.

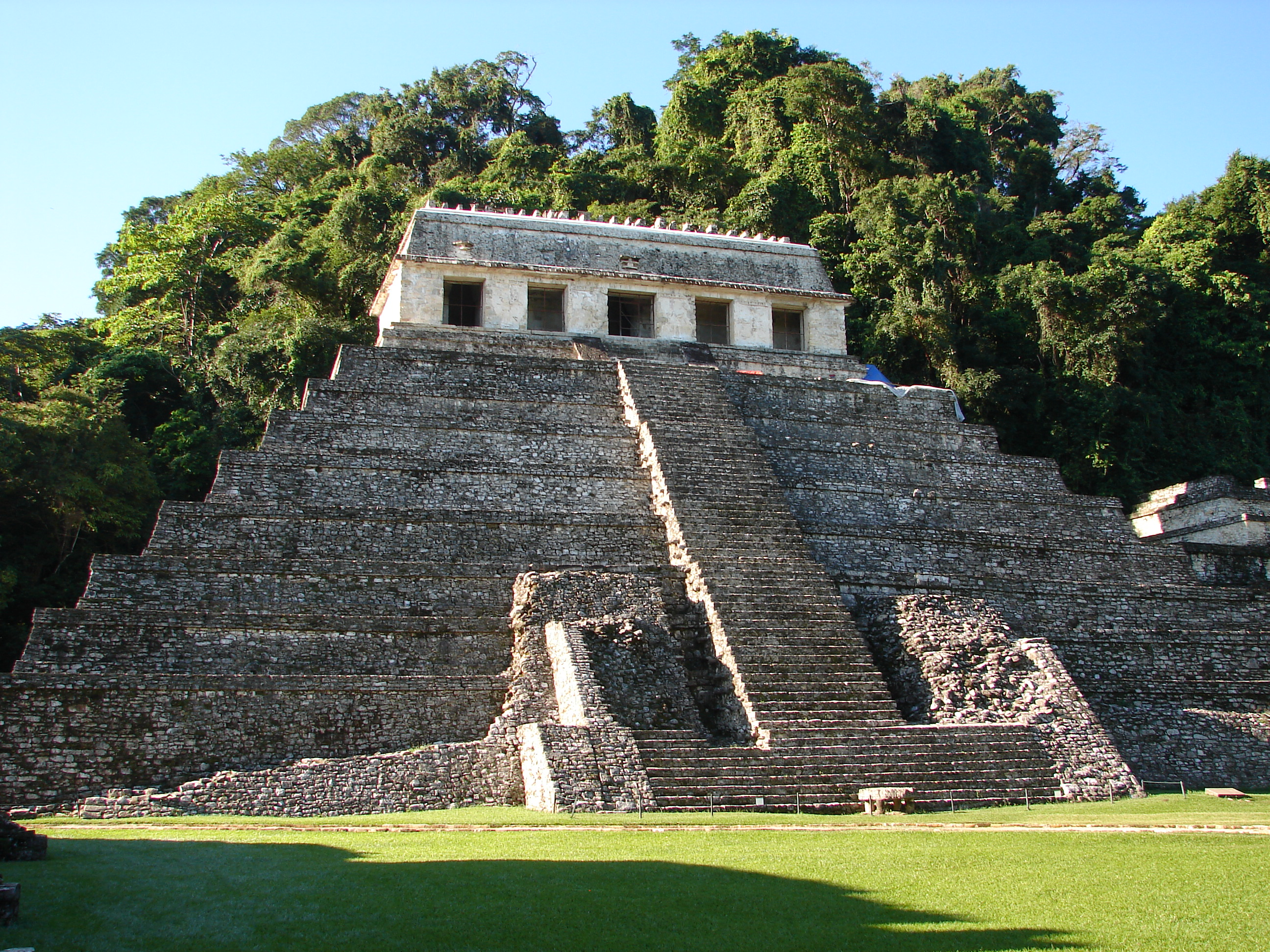
The Temple of the Inscriptions.

Initially, there was intense debate over whether the bones in the tomb truly belonged to Pakal. The skeleton's relatively minor degree of dental wear suggested that its owner was approximately 40 years younger than the age recorded for Pakal in the inscriptional texts. This discrepancy led some, including the tomb's discoverer, Alberto Ruz Lhuillier, to argue that the texts must have referred to two individuals with the same name or employed a non-standard method of recording time. Epigraphers, on the other hand, insisted that allowing for such possibilities would go against everything else that is known about the Maya calendar and Maya written history, and asserted that the texts clearly state that it is indeed Kʼinich Janaabʼ Pakal entombed within, and that he did in fact die at the advanced age of 80, after reigning for 68 years. More recent morphometric analysis of the rest of the skeleton demonstrates that the entombed individual could not have lived less than fifty years and most likely died in their eighth or ninth decade of life, consistent with the textual evidence rather than the younger age estimates of early researchers. The disparity between the dental wear and the skeletal morphology is likely due to Pakal's aristocratic status, which would have allowed him access to a softer, less abrasive diet than the average Maya person so that his teeth naturally acquired less wear. Unusually large accumulations of dental calculus on his teeth are also consistent with such an interpretation.

Further archaeological explorations have continued to shed light on Pakal's burial site. In 2016 an underground water tunnel was discovered under the Temple of Inscriptions; a stucco mask depicting an elderly Pakal was subsequently found in August 2018.

== Sarcophagus ==
Carved lid of the tomb of Kʼinich Janaab Pakal I in the Temple of the Inscriptions.

The large carved stone sarcophagus lid in the Temple of Inscriptions is a unique piece of Classic Maya art. Iconographically, however, it is closely related to the large wall panels of the temples of the Cross and the Foliated Cross centered on world trees. Around the edges of the lid is a band with cosmological signs, including those for sun, moon, and star, as well as the heads of six named noblemen of varying rank. The central image is that of a cruciform world tree. Beneath Pakal is one of the heads of a celestial two-headed serpent viewed frontally. Both the king and the serpent head on which he seems to rest are framed by the open jaws of a funerary serpent, a common iconographic device for signalling entrance into, or residence in, the realm(s) of the dead. The king himself wears the attributes of the Tonsured Maize God—in particular a turtle ornament on the breast—and is shown in a peculiar posture that may denote rebirth. Linda Schele saw Pakal falling down the Milky Way into the southern horizon.

== Pseudoarchaeology ==
Pakal's tomb has been the subject of ancient astronaut speculations since its appearance in Erich von Däniken's 1968 best-seller Chariots of the Gods?. Von Däniken reproduced a drawing of the sarcophagus lid (though incorrectly labelling it as being from Copán) and compared Pakal's pose to that of Project Mercury astronauts in the 1960s; he interpreted drawings underneath Pakal as rockets, and offered the sarcophagus lid as possible evidence of an extraterrestrial influence on the ancient Maya. Such an interpretation is almost universally denounced by archaeologists, epigraphers, and art historians of the Maya, who point out that von Däniken's claim relies solely upon visual inspection, paying heed neither to the broader archaeological context nor to a wealth of additional research on Classic Maya artistic conventions, symbolism, cosmology, and written history.

Another example of this carving's manifestation in pseudoarchaeology is the identification by José Argüelles of "Pacal Votan" as an incarnation named "Valum Votan," who would act as a "closer of the cycle" in 2012 (an event that is also significant on Argüelles' "13 Moon" calendar). Daniel Pinchbeck, in his book 2012: The Return of Quetzalcoatl (2006), also uses the name "Pacal Votan" for Pakal.

== Footnotes ==
Regnal titles
Preceded by Sak Kʼukʼ	King of Palenque; July 27, 615 – August 29, 683	Succeeded by Kʼinich Kan Bahlam II
