= Ajen Yohl Mat =

- Ajaw of Palenque

King of Palenque
- Reign: 1 January 605 – 8 August 612
- Predecessor: Yohl Ikʼnal
- Successor: Sak Kʼukʼ
- Born: Palenque
- Died: 11 August 612; Palenque
- Father: Kʼan Moʼ Hix (if mother is Sak Kʼukʼ); Janahb Pakal (a possibility if mother is Yohl Ikʼnal)
- Mother: Yohl Ikʼnal or Sak Kʼukʼ
- Religion: Maya religion

Ajen Yohl Mat (Note: The ruler's name, when transcribed is AJ-je-ne-(Y)O꞉L m-ta.) also known as Aj Neʼ Ohl Mat, Ac Kan and Ahl Lawal Mat, (died August 8, 612) was an ajaw of the Maya city-state of Palenque. He acceded to the throne on January 1, 605 and ruled until his death. (Note: These are the dates indicated on the Maya inscriptions in Mesoamerican Long Count calendar, Acceded: 9.8.11.9.10 8 Ok 18 Muwan and Died: 9.9.19.4.6 2 Kimi 14 Mol.) He was probably the son of Yohl Ikʼnal or Sak Kʼukʼ and the brother of Janahb Pakal or Kʼinich Janaab Pakal I. During his reign, his kingdom was invaded on April 4, 611 by Scroll Serpent, ruler of the Kaan kingdom (Calakmul).

== Sources ==
Regnal titles
| Preceded by Yohl Ikʼnal | Ajaw of Palenque; January 4, 605 – August 11, 612 | Succeeded by Janahb Pakal (position uncertain) or Sak Kʼukʼ |
