= Janahb Pakal =

Ajaw or lord of Palenque

- Died: 6 March 612; Palenque
- Spouse: Lady Yohl Ikʼnal (possibly her mother instead)
- Issue: (if husband of Lady Yohl Ikʼnal); Ajen Yohl Mat; Lady Sak Kʼukʼ
- Religion: Maya religion

Janahb Pakal also known as Janaab Pakal, Pakal I or Pakal the Elder, (died 6 March 612), was a nobleman and possible ajaw of the Maya city-state of Palenque.

== Biography ==
Pakal’s dynastic position is not entirely certain, though he may have been the grandfather or brother of Ajen Yohl Mat. It seems that he never ascended to the high-kingship in his own right. He was the father of Lady Sak Kʼukʼ, one of the rare queens regnant of Maya history. His wife or mother was Yohl Ikʼnal. During reign of his probable brother Ajen Yohl Mat, Palenque was invaded on April 4, 611 by Scroll Serpent, ruler of the Kaan kingdom (Calakmul). They were dead c. sixteen months later. In later years, he is ascribed a full emblem glyph. He should not be confused with his grandson, Kʼinich Janaabʼ Pakal who during a long reign of some 68 years was responsible for the construction or extension of some of Palenque’s most notable surviving inscriptions and monumental architecture.

== Sources ==
Regnal titles
Preceded by Ajen Yohl Mat	Uncertain c. 612	Succeeded by Sak Kʼukʼ
