= Palenque =

Ancient Maya city-state in Chiapas, Mexico

- Bàakʼ (Yucatec Maya), Lakamha (Itzá)
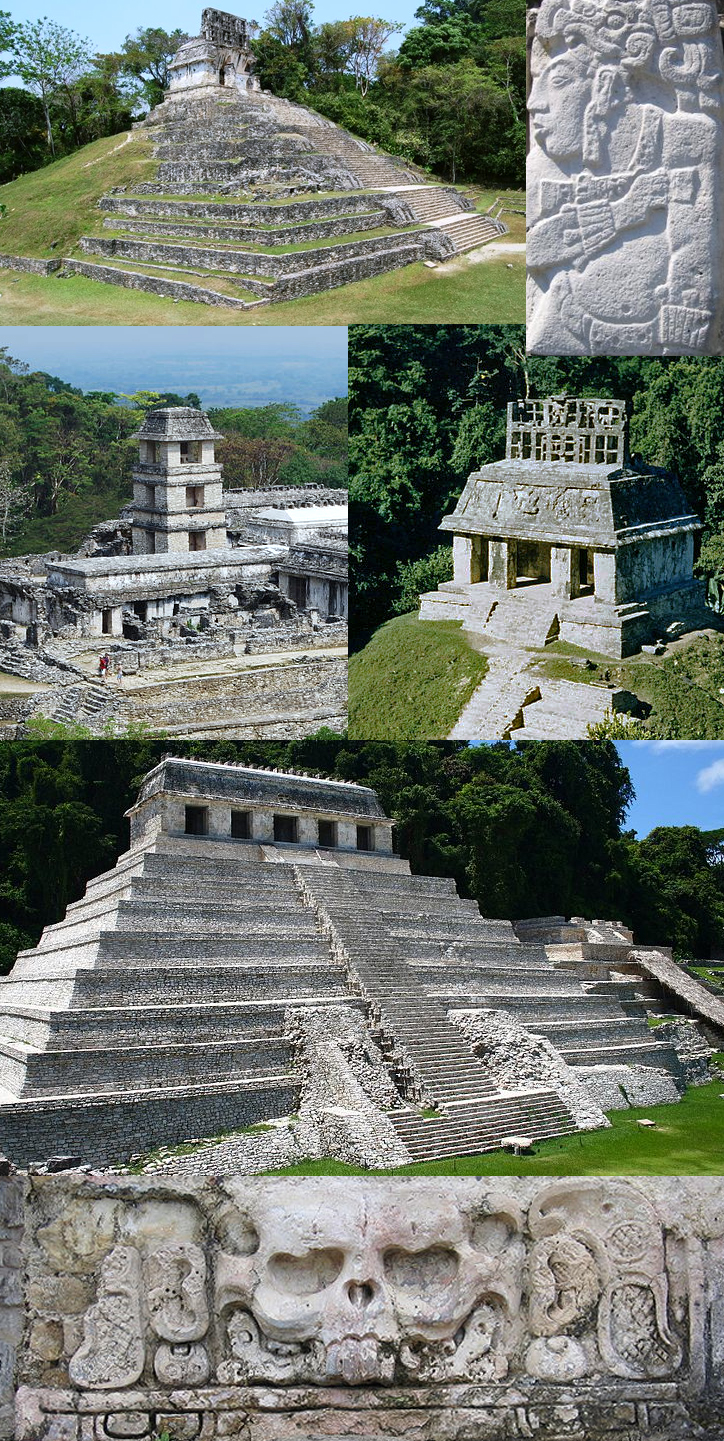
- Collage of Palenque

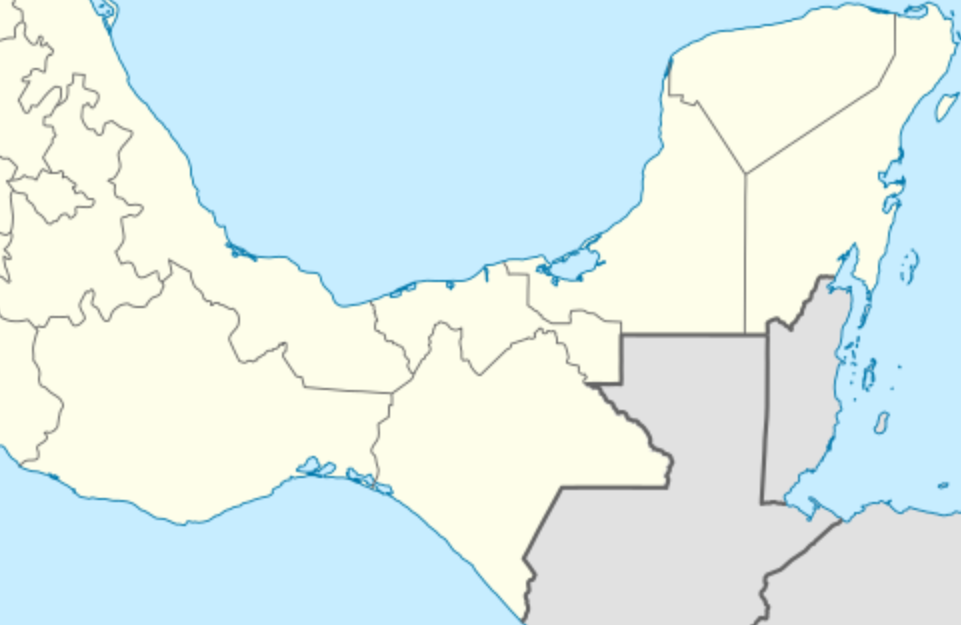
- Location within Mesoamerica Location in southern Mexico Palenque (Chiapas)
- 17°29′03″N 92°02′47″W
- Periods: Late Preclassic to Early Postclassic
- Cultures: Maya civilization
- Location: Palenque, Chiapas, Mexico
- Region: Chiapas

History
- Built: 226 BC
- Abandoned: 799 AD

UNESCO World Heritage Site
- Official name: Pre-Hispanic City and National Park of Palenque
- Criteria: Cultural: i, ii, iii, iv
- Reference: 411
- Inscription: 1987 (11th Session)
- Area: 1,772 ha (4,380 acres)
- The city of Palenque also is home to the Temple of the Inscriptions; inside lies the Sarcophagus of Pacal the Great.

Palenque (Spanish pronunciation: [pa'leŋke]; Yucatec Maya: Bàakʼ [ɓaːkʼ]), also anciently known in the Itzaʼ language as Lakamha ("big water" or "big waters"), was a Maya city-state in southern Mexico that perished in the 8th century. The Palenque ruins date from ca. 226 BC to ca. 799 AD. After its decline, it was overgrown by the jungle of cedar, mahogany, and sapodilla trees, but has since been excavated and restored. It is located near the Usumacinta River in the Mexican state of Chiapas, about 130 km (81 mi) south of Ciudad del Carmen, 150 meters (490 ft) above sea level. It is adjacent to the modern town of Palenque, Chiapas. It averages a humid 26 °C (79 °F) with roughly 2,160 millimeters (85 in) of rain a year.

Palenque is a medium-sized site, smaller than Tikal, Chichen Itza, or Copán, but it contains some of the finest architecture, sculpture, roof comb and bas-relief carvings that the Maya produced. Much of the history of Palenque has been reconstructed from reading the hieroglyphic inscriptions on the many monuments; historians now have a long sequence of the ruling dynasty of Palenque in the 5th century and extensive knowledge of the city-state's rivalry with other states such as Calakmul and Toniná. The most famous ruler of Palenque was Kʼinich Janaabʼ Pakal, or Pacal the Great, whose tomb has been found and excavated in the Temple of the Inscriptions. By 2005, the discovered area covered up to 2.5 km^{2} (0.97 sq mi), but it is estimated that less than 10% of the total area of the city is explored, leaving more than a thousand structures still covered by jungle. Palenque received 920,470 visitors in 2017.

== History ==
Mythological beings using a variety of emblem glyphs in their titles suggests a complex early history. For instance, Kʼukʼ Bahlam I, the supposed founder of the Palenque dynasty, is called a Toktan Ajaw in the text of the Temple of the Foliated Cross.

The famous structures that we know today probably represent a rebuilding effort in response to the attacks by the city of Calakmul and its client states in 599 and 611. One of the main figures responsible for rebuilding Palenque and for a renaissance in the city's art and architecture is also one of the best-known Maya Ajaw, Kʼinich Janaabʼ Pakal (Pacal the Great), who ruled from 615 to 683. He is known through his funerary monument dubbed the Temple of the Inscriptions, after the lengthy text preserved in the temple's superstructure. At the time Alberto Ruz Lhuillier excavated Pakal's tomb, it was the richest and best preserved of any scientifically excavated burial then known from the ancient Americas. It held this position until the discovery of the rich Moche burials at Sipán, Peru and the recent discoveries at Copán and Calakmul.

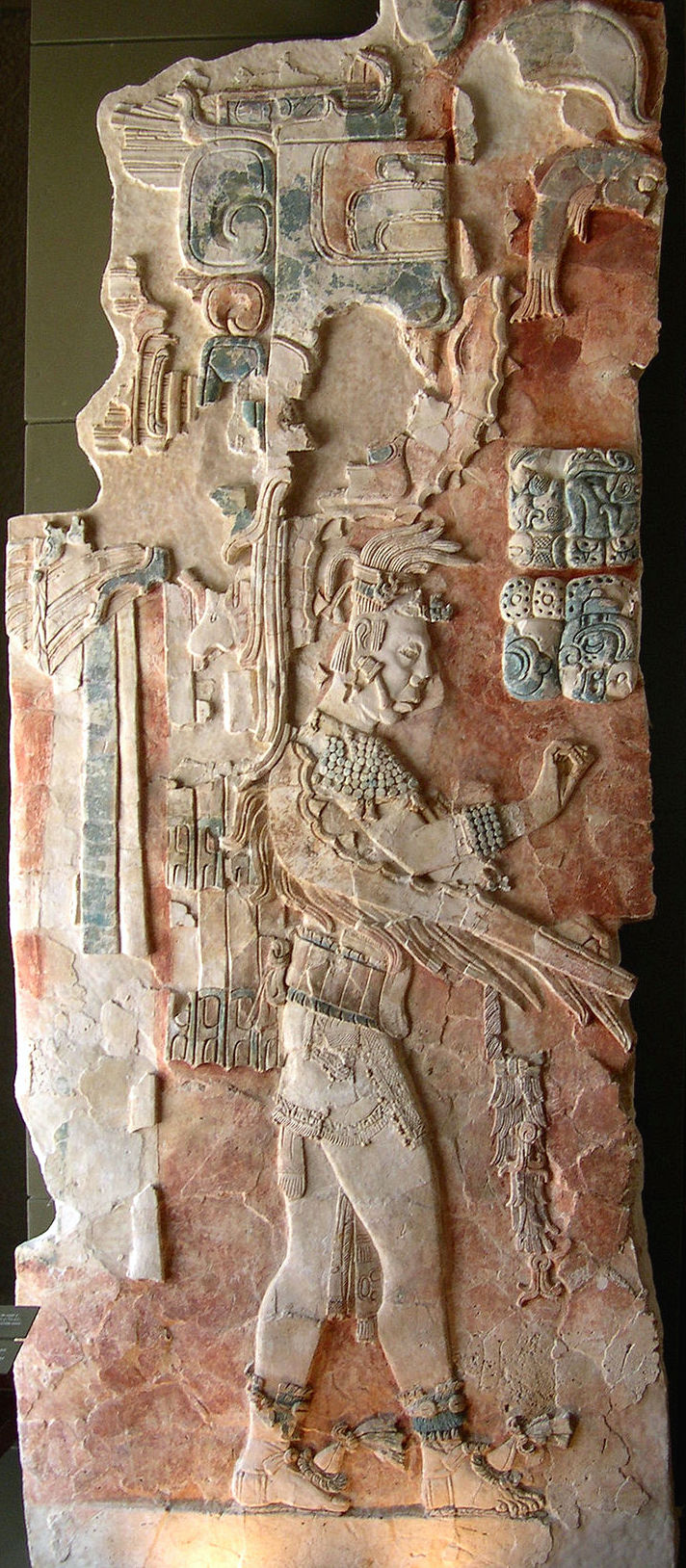
A bas-relief in the Palenque museum that depicts Upakal Kʼinich, the son of Kʼinich Ahkal Moʼ Naab III.

Beside the attention that Kʼinich Janaab' Pakal's tomb brought to Palenque, the city is historically significant for its extensive hieroglyphic corpus composed during the reigns of Janaabʼ Pakal, his son Kʼinich Kan Bahlam II, and his grandson Kʼinich Akal Moʼ Naabʼ, and for being the location where Heinrich Berlin and later Linda Schele and Peter Mathews outlined the first dynastic list for any Maya city. The work of Tatiana Proskouriakoff as well as that of Berlin, Schele, Mathews, and others, initiated the intense historical investigations that characterized much of the scholarship on the ancient Maya from the 1960s to the present. The extensive iconography and textual corpus has also allowed for study of Classic period Maya mythology and ritual practice.

=== Rulers ===
A list of possible and known Maya rulers of the city, with dates of their reigns:

Mythological and legendary rulers:
- ?-Muwaan Mat c.2325 BC
- Ukʼix Chan c.987 BC
- Casper c.252 BC

Palenque dynasty:

- Kʼukʼ Bahlam I 431–c.435 AD
- "Casper" 435–c.487 AD
- Bʼutz Aj Sak Chiik 487–c.501 AD
- Ahkal Moʼ Nahb I 501–524 AD
- Kʼan Joy Chitam I 529–565 AD
- Ahkal Moʼ Nahb II 565–570 AD
- Kan Bahlam I 572–583 AD
- Yohl Ikʼnal 583–604 AD (female)
- Ajen Yohl Mat 605–612 AD
- Janahb Pakal c.612 AD (position uncertain)
- Sak Kʼukʼ 612–615 AD (female)
- Kʼinich Janaabʼ Pakal I 615–683 AD
- Kʼinich Kan Bahlam II 684–702 AD
- Kʼinich Kʼan Joy Chitam II 702–711 AD
- Kʼinich Ahkal Moʼ Nahb III 721–c.736 AD
- Kʼinich Janaab Pakal II c.742 AD
- Kʼinich Kan Bahlam III c.751 AD
- Kʼinich Kʼukʼ Bahlam II 764–c.783 AD
- Janaab Pakal III 799–? AD

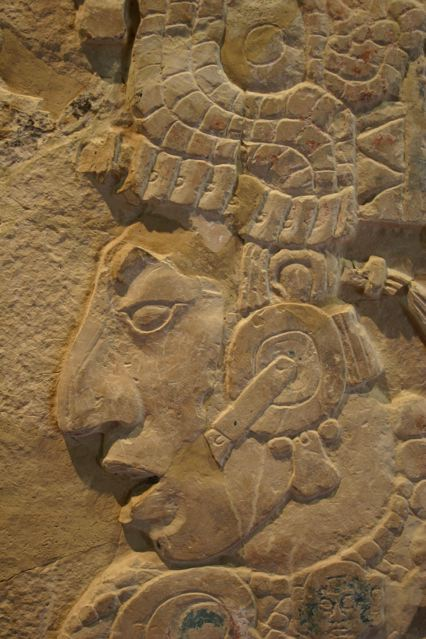
Kʼinich Kan Bʼalam II, one of the many rulers of Palenque. Detail from the Temple XVII Tablet.

=== Early Classic period ===
The first ajaw, or king, of Bʼaakal that we know of was Kʼuk Balam (Quetzal Jaguar), who governed for four years starting in the year 431. After him, a king came to power, nicknamed "Casper" by archaeologists. The next two kings were probably Casper's sons. Little was known about the first of these, Bʼutz Aj Sak Chiik, until 1994, when a tablet was found describing a ritual for the king. The first tablet mentioned his successor Ahkal Moʼ Naab I as a teenage prince, and therefore it is believed that there was a family relation between them. For unknown reasons, Akhal Moʼ Naab I had great prestige, so the kings who succeeded him were proud to be his descendants.

When Ahkal Moʼ Naab I died in 524, there was an interregnum of four years, before the following king was crowned at Toktán in 529. Kʼan Joy Chitam I governed for 36 years. His sons Ahkal Moʼ Naab II and Kʼan Bʼalam I were the first kings who used the title Kinich, which means "the great sun". This word was used also by later kings. Bʼalam was succeeded in 583 by Yohl Ikʼnal, who was supposedly his daughter. The inscriptions found in Palenque document a battle that occurred under her government in which troops from Calakmul invaded and sacked Palenque, a military feat without known precedents. These events took place in 599.

A second victory by Calakmul occurred some twelve years later, in 611, under the government of Aj Ne' Yohl Mat, son of Yohl Iknal. In this occasion, the king of Calakmul entered Palenque in person, consolidating a significant military disaster, which was followed by an epoch of political disorder. Aj Ne' Yohl Mat was to die in 612.

=== Late Classic period ===
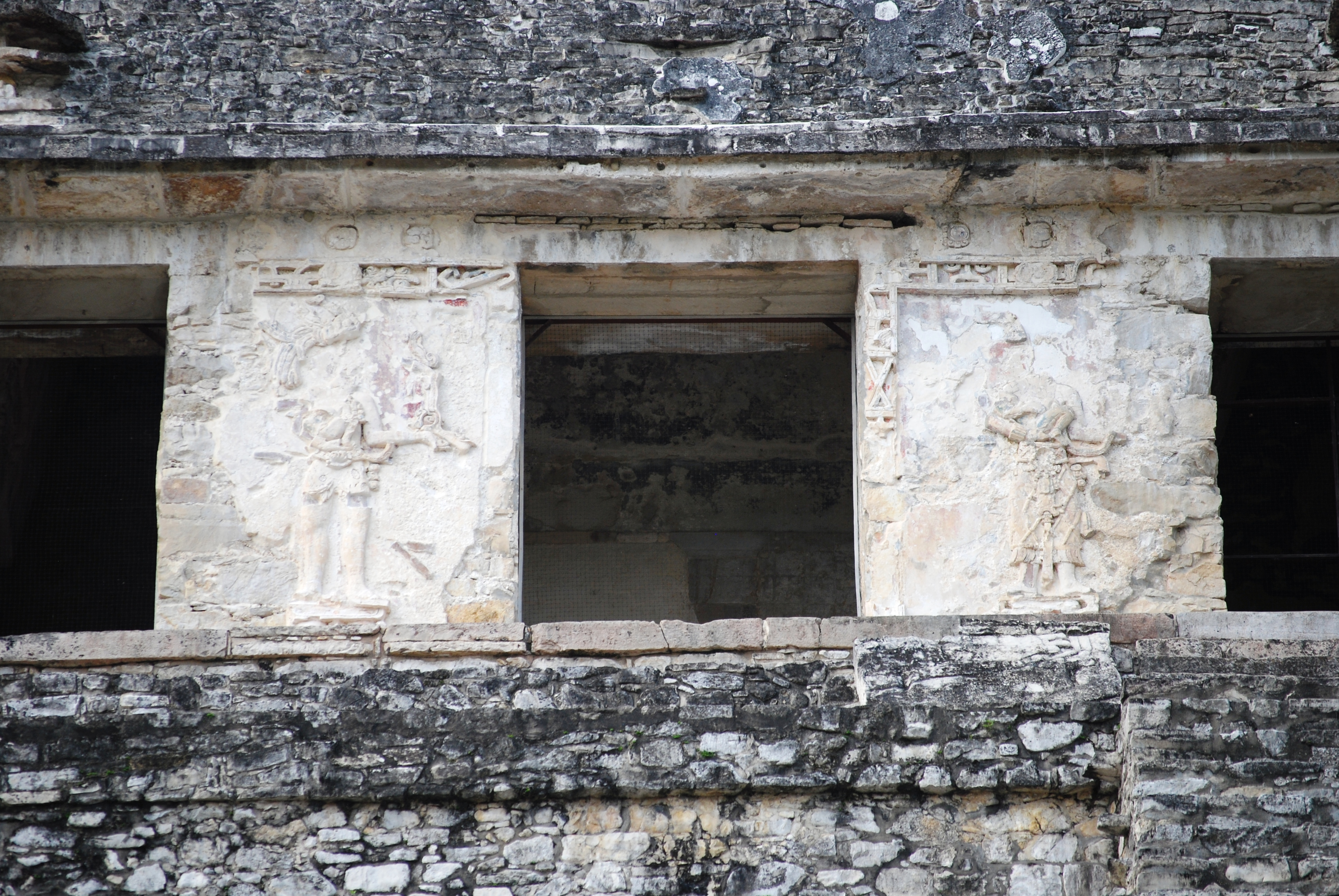
The two inner columns from the Temple of the Inscriptions

Bʼaakal began the Late Classic period in the throes of the disorder created by the defeats before Calakmul. The glyphic panels at the Temple of the Inscriptions, which records the events at this time, relates that some fundamental annual religious ceremonies were not performed in 613, and at this point states: "Lost is the divine lady, lost is the king." Mentions of the government at the time have not been found.

It is believed that after the death of Aj Ne' Yohl Mat, Janaab Pakal, also called Pakal I, took power thanks to a political agreement. Janaab Pakal assumed the functions of the ajaw (king) but never was crowned. He was succeeded in 612 by his daughter, the queen Sak Kʼukʼ, who governed for only three years until her son was old enough to rule. It is considered that the dynasty was reestablished from then on, so Bʼaakal retook the path of glory and splendor.

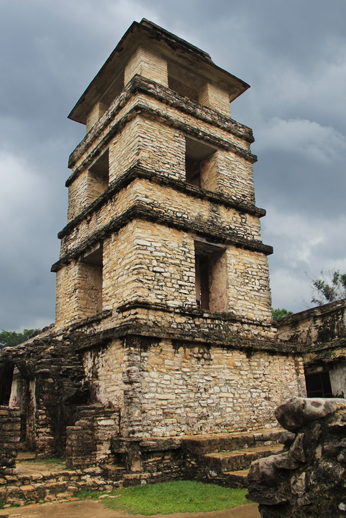
The Palace Observation Tower

The grandson of Janaab Pakal is the most famous of the Maya kings, Kʼinich Janaab' Pakal, also known as Pakal the Great. He began rule at the age of 12 years after his mother Sak Kuk resigned as queen after three years, thus passing power on to him. Pakal the Great reigned in Palenque from 615 to 683, and his mother remained an important force for the first 25 years of his rule. She may have ruled jointly with him. Known as the favorite of the gods, he carried Palenque to new levels of splendor, in spite of having come to power when the city was at a low point. Pakal married the princess of Oktán, Lady Tzakbu Ajaw (also known as Ahpo-Hel) in 624 and had at least three children.

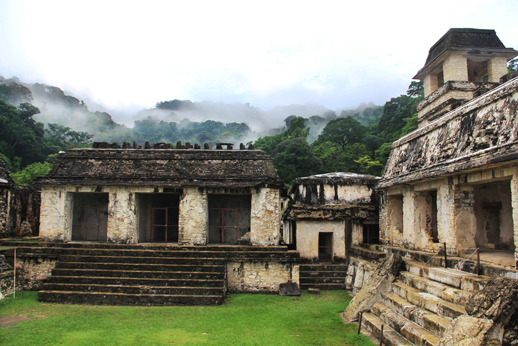
The Palace as seen from the courtyard.

Most of the palaces and temples of Palenque were constructed during his government; the city flourished as never before, eclipsing Tikal. The central complex, known as The Palace, was enlarged and remodeled on various occasions, notably in the years 654, 661, and 668. In this structure, is a text describing how in that epoch Palenque was newly allied with Tikal, and also with Yaxchilan, and that they were able to capture the six enemy kings of the alliance. Not much more had been translated from the text.

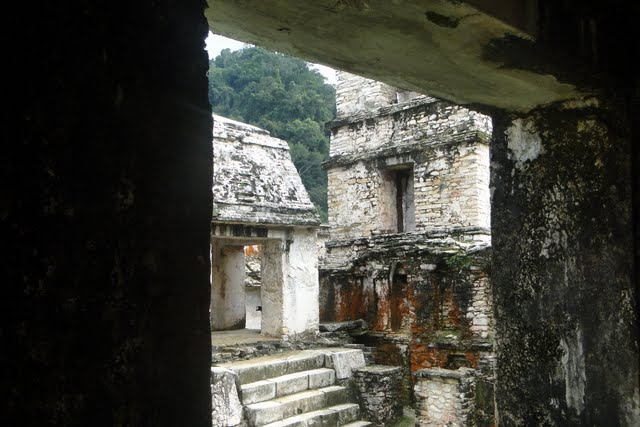
In the Palace

After the death of Pakal in 683, his older son Kʼinich Kan Bʼalam assumed the kingship of Bʼaakal, who in turn was succeeded in 702 by his brother Kʼinich Kʼan Joy Chitam II. The first continued the architectural and sculptural works that were begun by his father, as well as finishing the construction of the famous tomb of Pakal. Pakal's sarcophagus, built for a very tall man, held the richest collection of jade seen in a Maya tomb. A jade mosaic mask was placed over his face, and a suit made of jade adorned his body, with each piece hand-carved and held together by gold wire.

Kʼinich Kan Bʼalam I started several building projects, including the Group of the Crosses. Sculptures from his government include portraits of this king. His brother succeeded him, reconstructing and enlarging the northern side of the Palace. The reigns of these three kings resulted in a century of expansion.

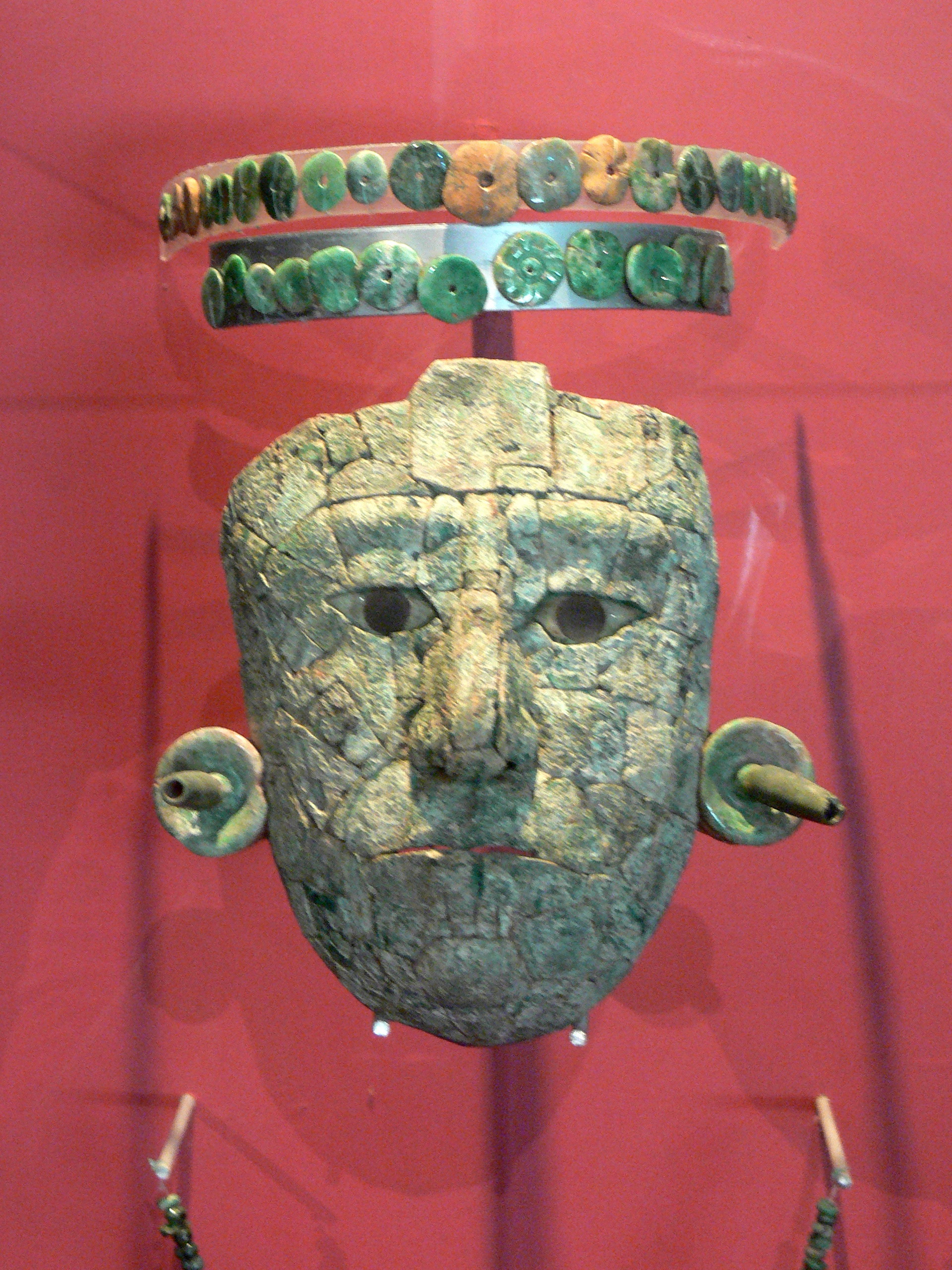
Mask of the Red Queen from the tomb found in Temple XIII.

In 711, Palenque was sacked by the realm of Toniná, and the old king Kʼinich Kʼan Joy Chitam II was taken prisoner. It is not known what the final fate of the king was, and it is presumed that he was executed in Toniná. For 10 years there was no king. Finally, Kʼinich Ahkal Moʼ Nab' III was crowned in 722. Although the new king belonged to the royalty, there is no evidence that he was the direct inheritor of Kʼinich Kʼan Joy Chitam II. It is believed, therefore, that this coronation was a break in the dynastic line, and probably Kʼinich Ahkal Nab' arrived to power after years of maneuvering and forging political alliances. This king, his son, and grandson governed until the end of the 8th century. Little is known about this period, except that, among other events, the war with Toniná continued, where there are hieroglyphics that record a new defeat of Palenque.

Occasionally city-state lords were women. Lady Sak Kuk ruled at Palenque for at least three years starting in 612 CE, before she passed her title to her son. However, these female rulers were accorded male attributes. They were presented as more masculine, since they had assumed roles that were typically held by men.

=== Abandonment ===
During the 8th century, Bʼaakal came under increasing stress, in concert with most other Classic Maya city-states, and there was no new elite construction in the ceremonial center sometime after 800. An agricultural population continued to live here for a few generations, then the site was abandoned and was slowly grown over by the forest. The district was very sparsely populated when the Spanish first arrived in the 1520s.

== Art and architecture ==
Important structures at Palenque include:

=== Temple of the Inscriptions ===
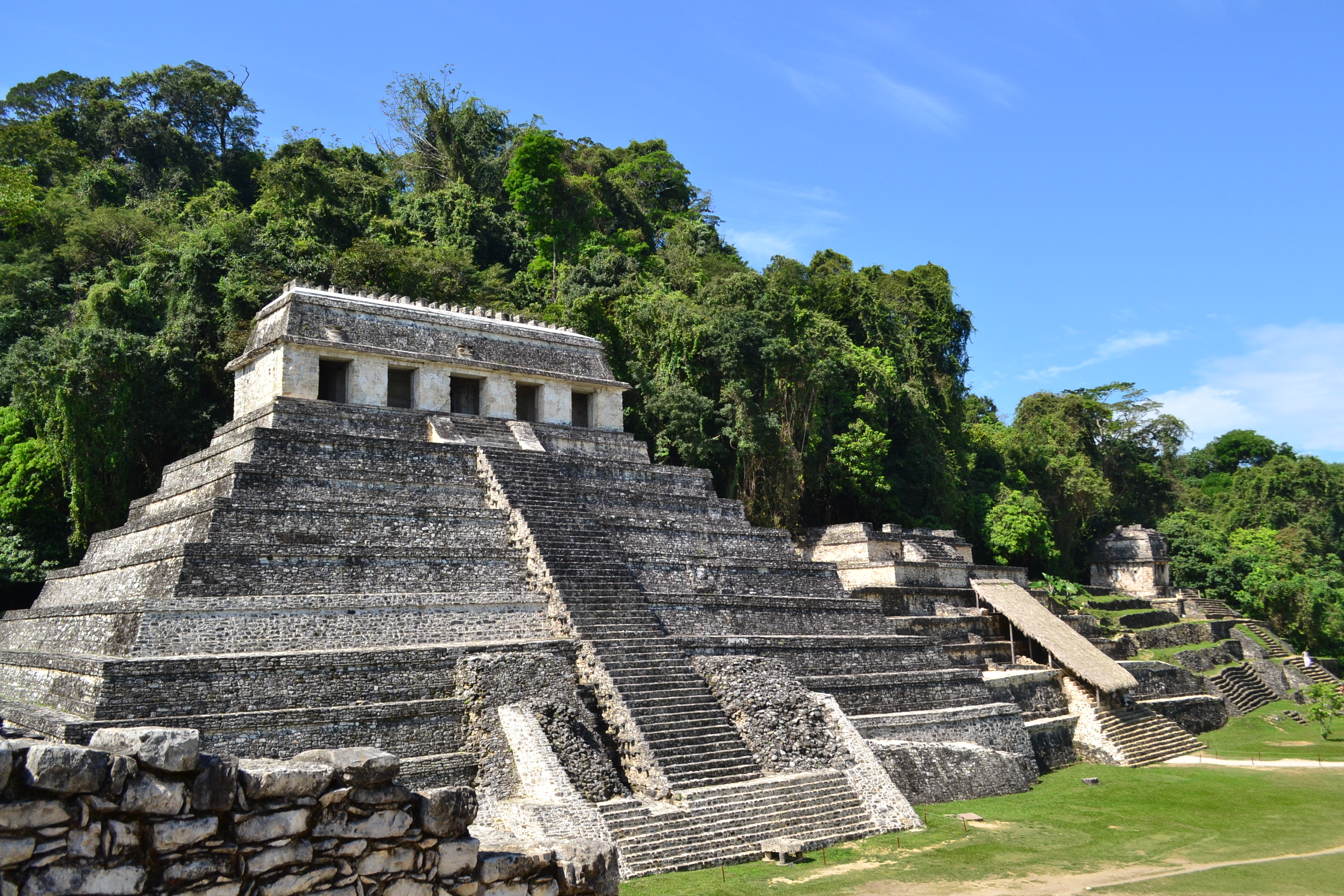
Temple of the Inscriptions

The Temple of the Inscriptions had begun perhaps as early as 675 as the funerary monument of Hanab-Pakal. The temple superstructure houses the second longest glyphic text known from the Maya world (the longest is the Hieroglyphic Stairway at Copan). The Temple of the Inscriptions records approximately 180 years of the city's history from the 4th through 12th Kʼatun. The focal point of the narrative records Kʼinich Janaabʼ Pakal's Kʼatun period-ending rituals focused on the icons of the city's patron deities prosaically known collectively as the Palenque Triad or individually as GI, GII, and GIII.

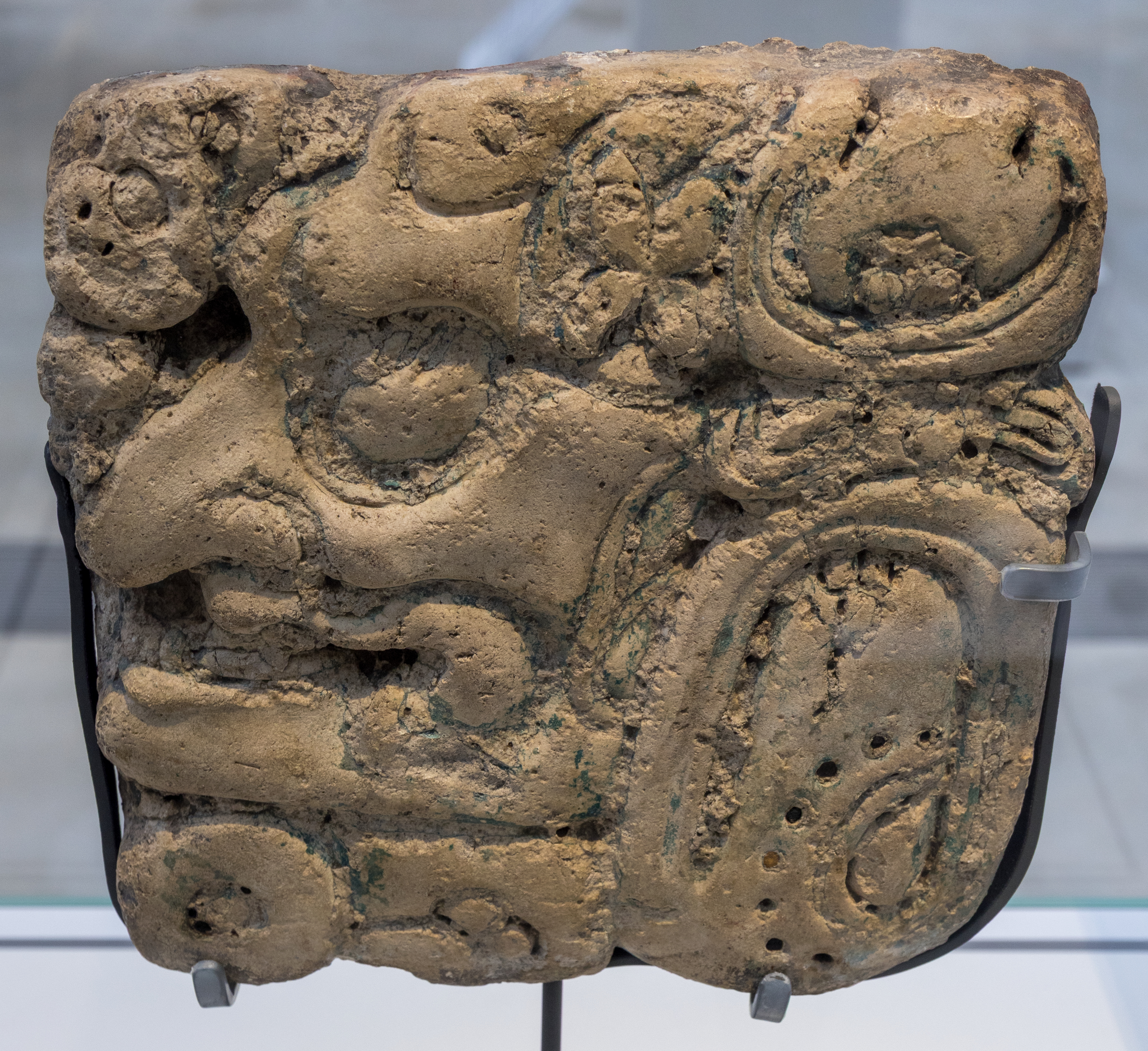
Klassisk mayabasrelieff (600-900) Musée du quai Branly – Jacques Chirac

The pyramid measures 60 meters wide, 42.5 meters deep and 27.2 meters high. The summit temple measures 25.5 meters wide, 10.5 meters deep and 11.4 meters high. The largest stones weigh 12 to 15 tons. These were on top of the pyramid. The total volume of pyramid and temple is 32,500 cu. meters.

In 1952 Alberto Ruz Lhuillier removed a stone slab in the floor of the back room of the temple superstructure to reveal a passageway (filled in shortly before the city's abandonment and reopened by archeologists) leading through a long stairway to Pakal's tomb. The tomb itself is remarkable for its large carved sarcophagus, the rich ornaments accompanying Pakal, and for the stucco sculpture decorating the walls of the tomb. Unique to Pakal's tomb is the psychoduct, which leads from the tomb itself, up the stairway and through a hole in the stone covering the entrance to the burial. This psychoduct is perhaps a physical reference to concepts about the departure of the soul at the time of death in Maya eschatology where in the inscriptions the phrase ochb'ihaj sak ikʼil (the white breath road-entered) is used to refer to the leaving of the soul. A find such as this is greatly important because it demonstrated for the first time the temple usage as being multifaceted. These pyramids were, for the first time, identified as temples and also funerary structures.

The much-discussed iconography of the sarcophagus lid depicts Pakal in the guise of one of the manifestations of the Maya maize god emerging from the maws of the underworld.

The temple also has a duct structure that still is not completely understood by archaeologists. It has been suggested that the duct aligns with the winter solstice and that the sun shines down on Pakal's tomb.

=== Temples of the Cross group ===
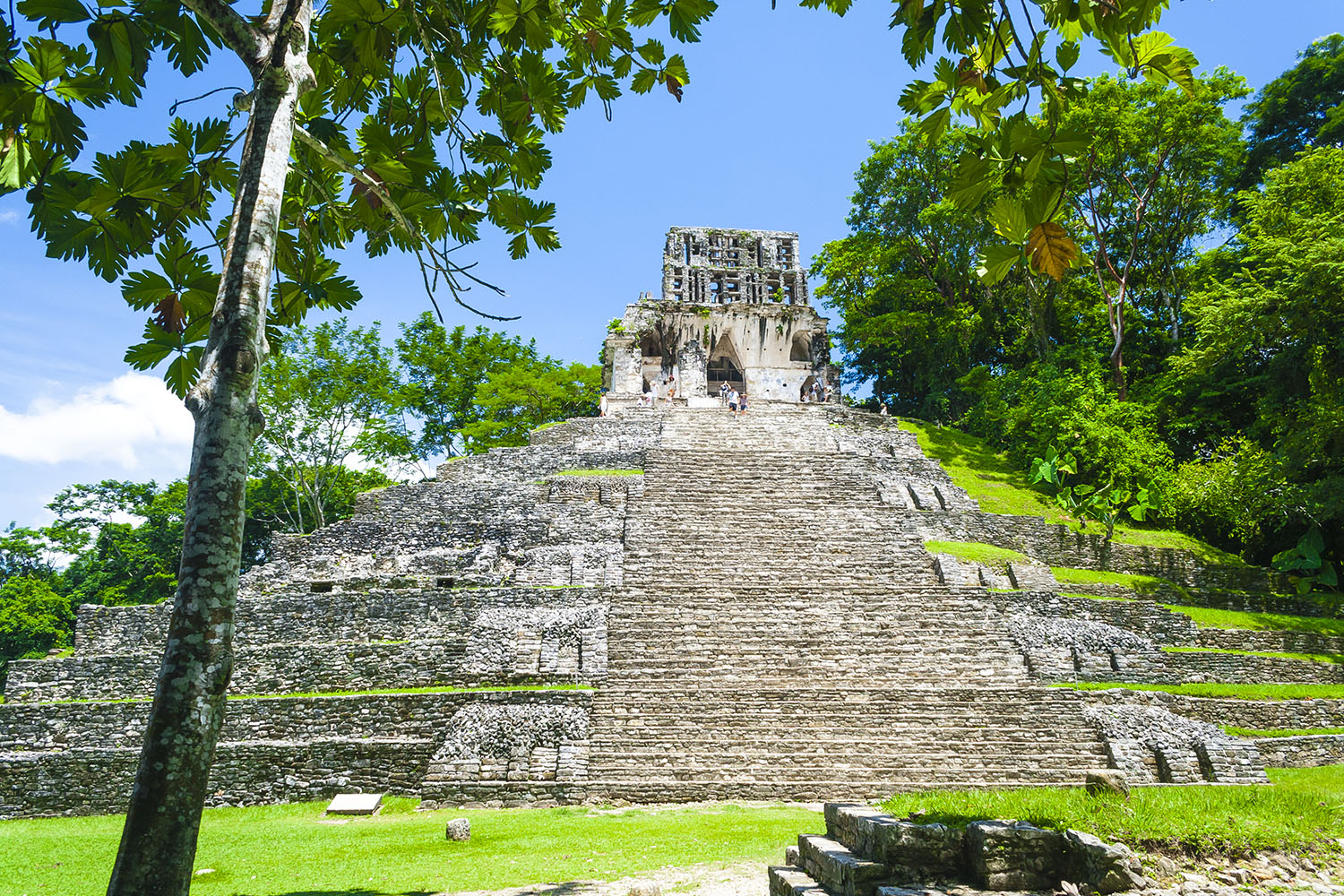
Temple of the Cross

The Temple of the Cross, Temple of the Sun, and Temple of the Foliated Cross are a set of graceful temples atop step pyramids, each with an elaborately carved relief in the inner chamber depicting two figures presenting ritual objects and effigies to a central icon. Earlier interpretations had argued that the smaller figure was that of Kʼinich Janaabʼ Pakal while the larger figure was Kʼinich Kan Bʼahlam. However, it is now known based on a better understanding of the iconography and epigraphy that the central tablet depicts two images of Kan Bʼahlam. The smaller figure shows Kʼinich Kan Bʼahlam during a rite of passage ritual at the age of six (9.10.8.9.3 9 Akbal 6 Xul) while the larger is of his accession to kingship at the age of 48. These temples were named by early explorers; the cross-like images in two of the reliefs actually depict the tree of creation at the center of the world in Maya mythology.

=== Palace ===
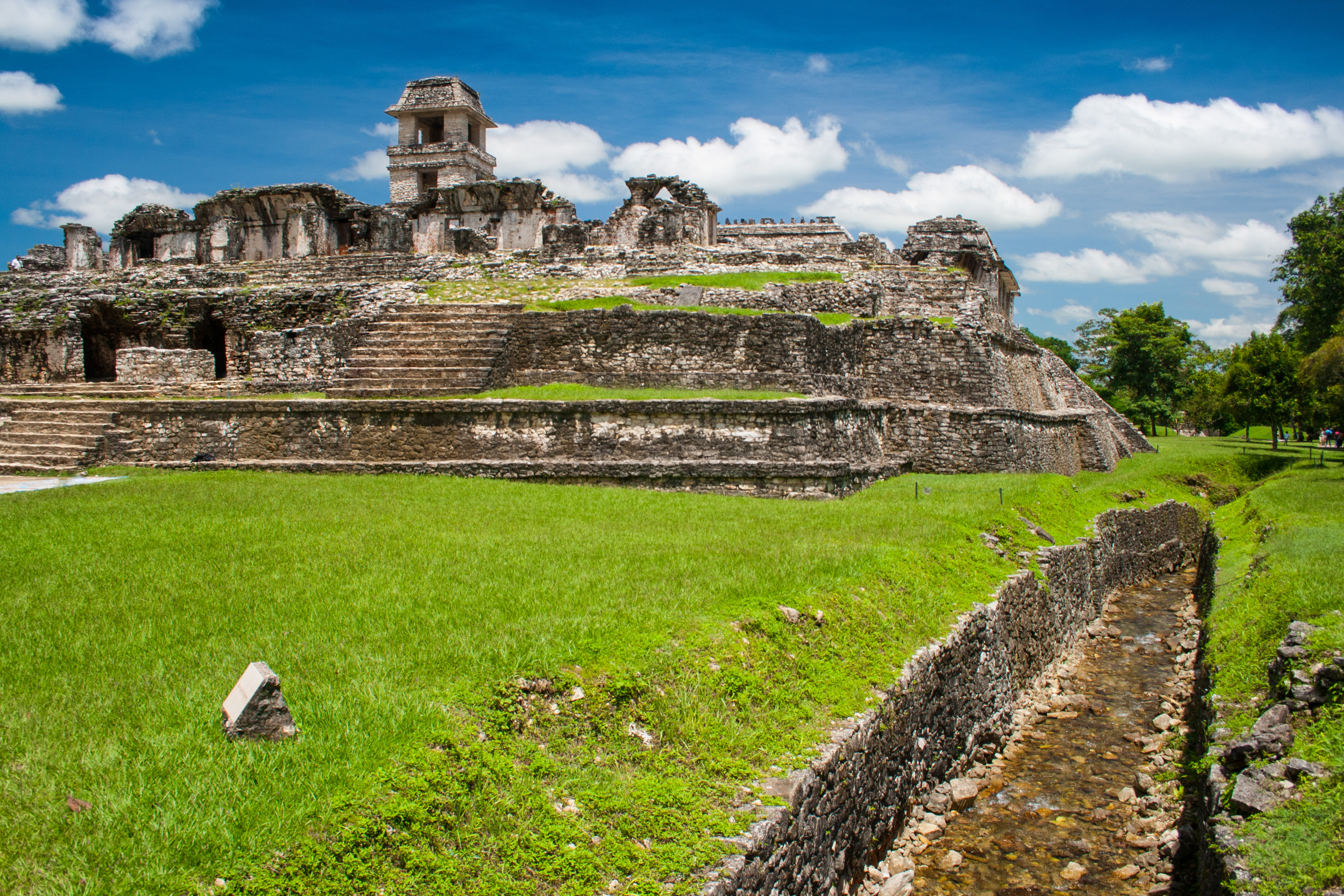
The Palace and aqueduct

The Palace, a complex of several connected and adjacent buildings and courtyards, was built by several generations on a wide artificial terrace during four century period. The Palace was used by the Maya aristocracy for bureaucratic functions, entertainment, and ritualistic ceremonies. The Palace is located in the center of the ancient city.

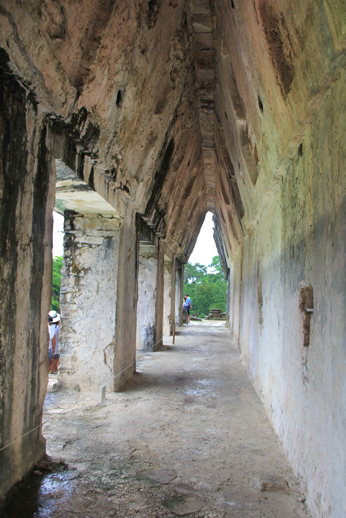
The corbel arch seen in a hallway at the Palace

Within the Palace there are numerous sculptures and bas-relief carvings that have been conserved. The Palace most unusual and recognizable feature is the four-story tower known as The Observation Tower. The Observation Tower like many other buildings at the site exhibit a mansard-like roof. The A-shaped corbel arch is an architectural motif observed throughout the complex. The Corbel arches require a large amount of masonry mass and are limited to a small dimensional ratio of width to height providing the characteristic high ceilings and narrow passageways. The Palace was equipped with numerous large baths and saunas which were supplied with fresh water by an intricate water system. An aqueduct, constructed of great stone blocks with a three-meter-high vault, diverts the Otulum River to flow underneath the main plaza. The Palace is the largest building complex in Palenque measuring 97 meters by 73 meters at its base.

=== Other notable buildings ===
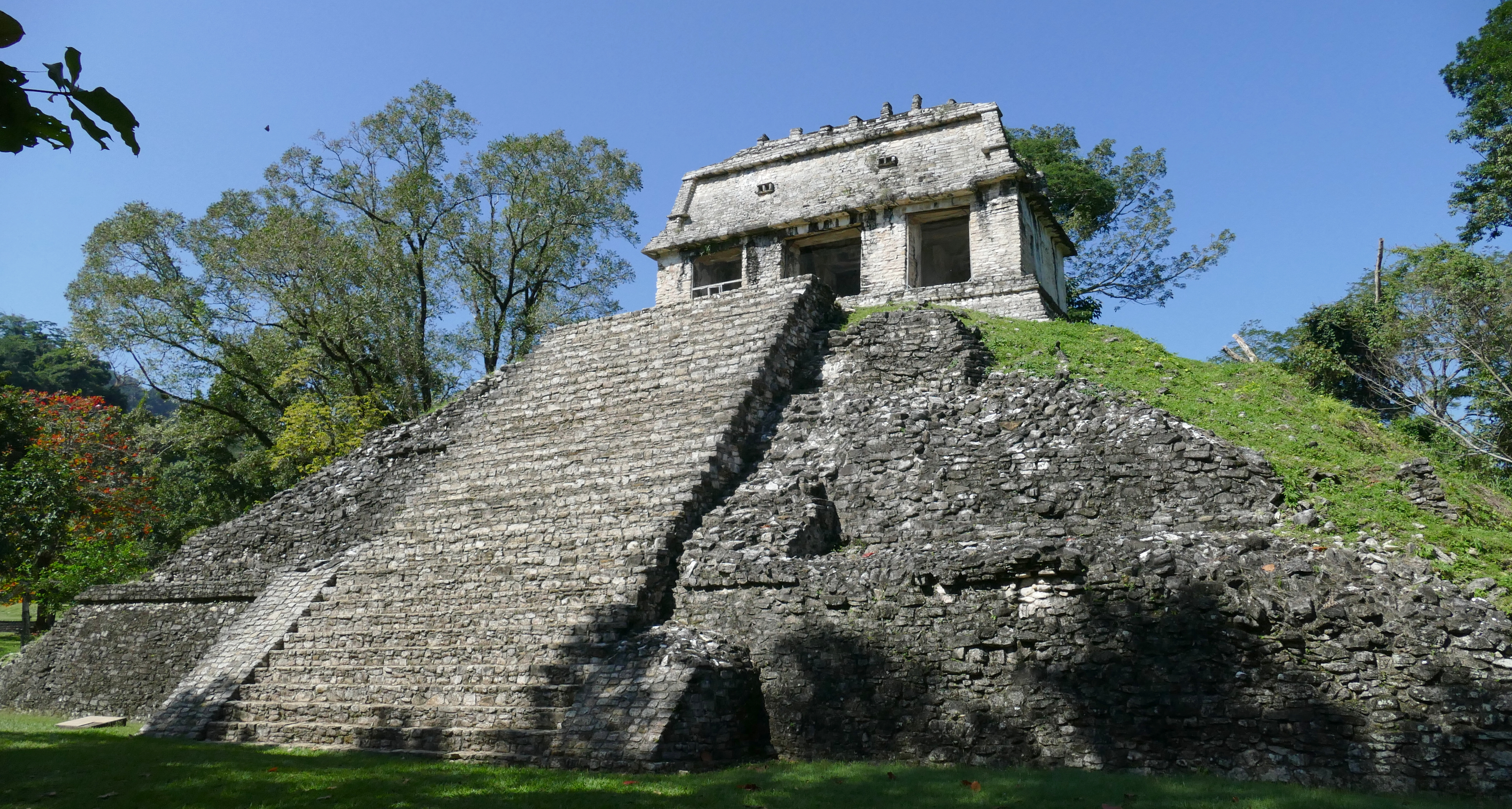
Temple of the Count

- The Temple of the Skull has a skull on one of the pillars.
- Temple XIII contained the Tomb of the Red Queen, an unknown noble woman, possibly the wife of Pakal, discovered in 1994. The remains in the sarcophagus were completely covered with a bright red powder made of cinnabar.
- The Temple of The Jaguar (a.k.a. The Temple of the Beautiful Relief) at a distance of some 200 meters south of the main group of temples; its name came from the elaborate bas-relief carving of a king seated on a throne in the form of a jaguar.
- Structure XII with a bas-relief carving of the God of Death.
- Temple of the Count another elegant Classic Palenque temple, which got its name from the fact that early explorer Jean-Frédéric Waldeck lived in the building for some time, and Waldeck claimed to be a count.

The site also has a number of other temples, tombs, and elite residences, some a good distance from the center of the site, a court for playing the Mesoamerican ballgame, and an interesting stone bridge over the Otulum River some distance below the Aqueduct.

=== Hydraulic Engineering and Stream Management ===
The ancient Maya name for Palenque, Lakamha' ("Big Water"), reflects the site's unique hydrological setting, characterized by steep karst topography, active alluvial springs, and a high annual rainfall exceeding 2,150 millimeters. To control seasonal flash flooding, prevent soil erosion, and supply fresh water to the royal court, Classic period architects engineered an intricate sub-surface hydrological network consisting of stone aqueducts, subterranean vaulted channels, and pressurized conduits.

- The Otulum Aqueduct: A subterranean masonry conduit measuring over 100 meters in length, constructed with a 3-meter-high corbel arch vault beneath the main plaza to divert the Otulum River directly under The Palace complex.
- Piedras Bolas Pressurized Conduit: A spring-fed stone aqueduct constructed on a steep gradient that features a constricted terminal outlet. This architectural design artificially created hydraulic pressure, enabling water to jet up to 6 meters in height for urban distribution or ceremonial displays.
- Picota and Michol Drainage Canals: A series of secondary stone-lined channels and holding tanks designed to regulate stream runoff from the southern limestone ridges, protecting the lower residential terraces from erosion during heavy tropical downpours.

== Modern investigations ==
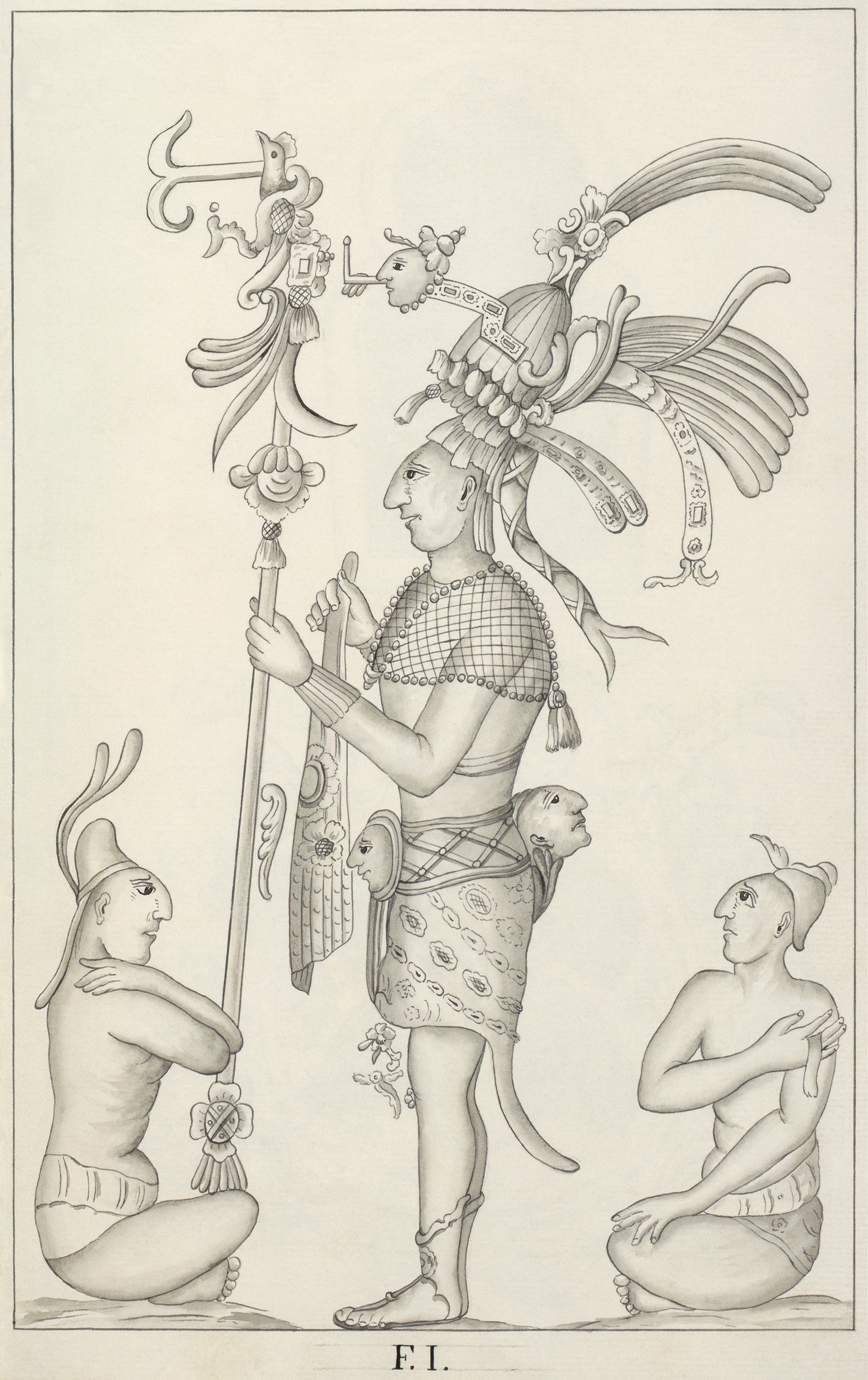
Detail of a relief at the Palace drawn by Ricardo Almendáriz during the Del Rio expedition in 1787

After de la Nada's brief account of the ruins, no attention was paid to them until 1773 when one Don Ramon de Ordoñez y Aguilar examined Palenque and sent a report to the Capitan General in Antigua Guatemala, a further examination was made in 1784 saying that the ruins were of particular interest, so two years later surveyor and architect Antonio Bernasconi was sent with a small military force under Colonel Antonio del Río to examine the site in more detail. Del Rio's forces smashed through several walls to see what could be found, doing a fair amount of damage to the Palace, while Bernasconi made the first map of the site as well as drawing copies of a few of the bas-relief figures and sculptures. Draughtsman Luciano Castañeda made more drawings in 1807, and a book on Palenque, Descriptions of the Ruins of an Ancient City, discovered near Palenque, was published in London in 1822 based on the reports of those last two expeditions together with engravings based on Bernasconi and Castañedas drawings; two more publications in 1834 contained descriptions and drawings based on the same sources.

Juan Galindo visited Palenque in 1831, and filed a report with the Central American government. He was the first to note that the figures depicted in Palenque's ancient art looked like the local Native Americans; some other early explorers, even years later, attributed the site to such distant peoples as Egyptians, Polynesians, or the Lost Tribes of Israel.

Starting in 1832 Jean-Frédéric Waldeck spent two years at Palenque making numerous drawings, but most of his work was not published until 1866. Meanwhile, the site was visited in 1840 first by Patrick Walker and Herbert Caddy on a mission from the governor of British Honduras, and then by John Lloyd Stephens and Frederick Catherwood who published an illustrated account the following year which was greatly superior to the previous accounts of the ruins.

Désiré Charnay took the first photographs of Palenque in 1858, and returned in 1881–1882. Alfred Maudslay encamped at the ruins in 1890–1891 and took extensive photographs of all the art and inscriptions he could find, and made paper and plaster molds of many of the inscriptions, and detailed maps and drawings, setting a high standard for all future investigators to follow. Maudslay learned the technique of making the papier mache molds of the sculptures from Frenchman Desire Charnay.

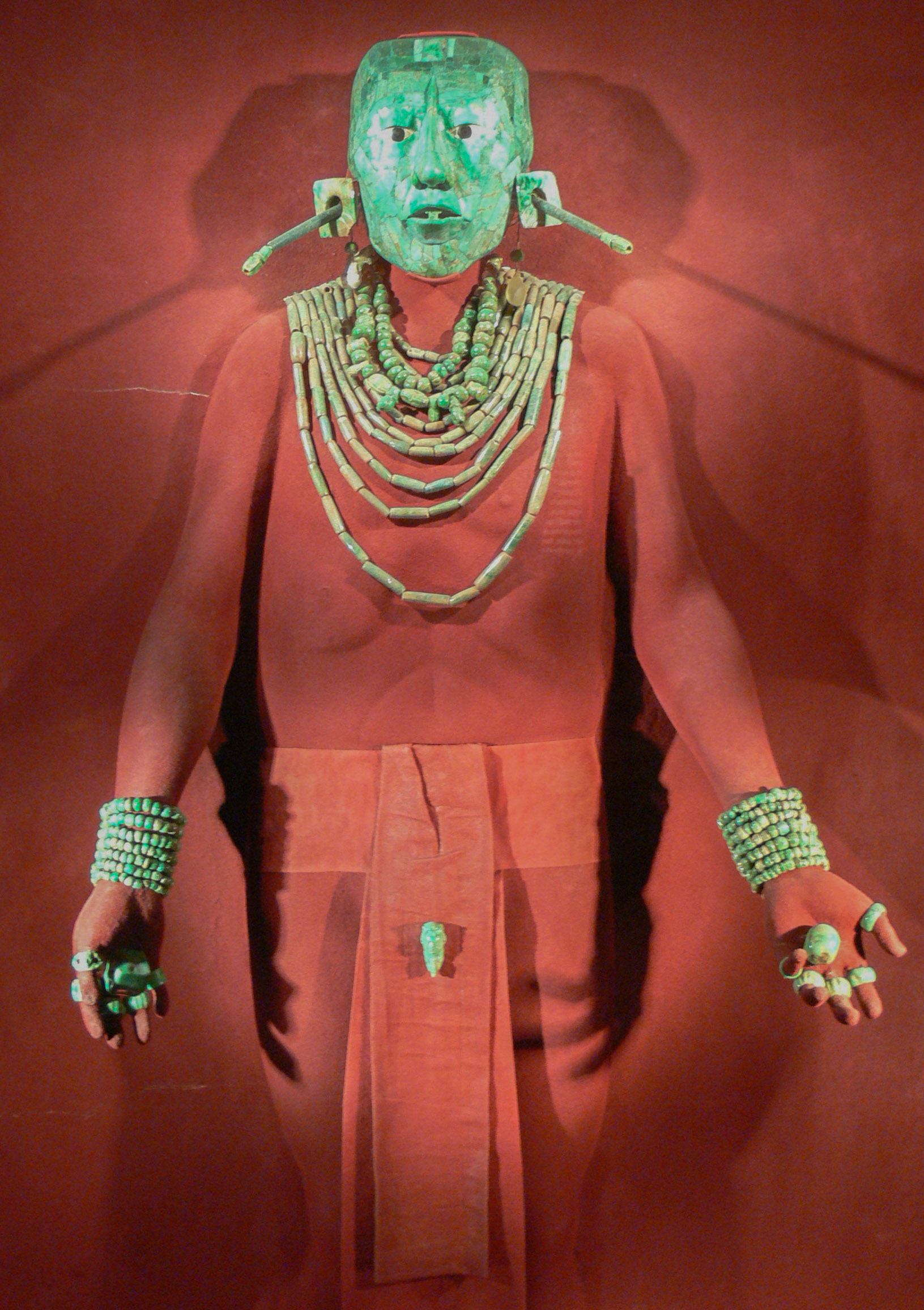
Jade mask of King Kʼinich Janaab Pakal. National Museum of Anthropology and History, Mexico City.

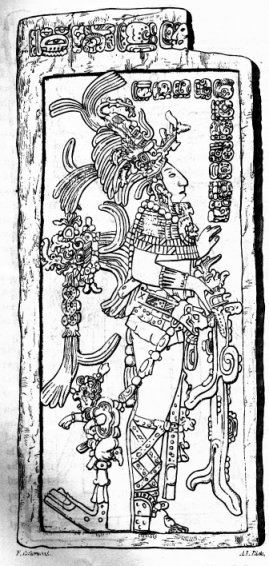
Kʼinich Kʼan Bʼalam II ("Chan Bahlam II").

Several other expeditions visited the ruins before Frans Blom of Tulane University in 1923, who made superior maps of both the main site and various previously neglected outlying ruins and filed a report for the Mexican government on recommendations on work that could be done to preserve the ruins.

From 1949 through 1952 Alberto Ruz Lhuillier supervised excavations and consolidations of the site for Mexico's National Institute of Anthropology and History (INAH); it was Ruz Lhuillier who was the first person to gaze upon Pacal the Great's tomb in over a thousand years. Ruz worked for four years at the Temple of the Inscriptions before unearthing the tomb. Further INAH work was done, led by Jorge Acosta, into the 1970s.

In 1973, the first of the productive Palenque Mesa Redonda (Round table) conferences was held here at the initiative of Merle Greene Robertson; thereafter every few years Mayanists would meet at Palenque to discuss and examine new findings in the field. Meanwhile, Robertson was conducting a examination of all art at Palenque, including recording all the traces of color on the sculptures.

The 1970s also saw a small museum built at the site.

In the last 15 or 20 years, a great deal more of the site has been excavated, but currently archaeologists estimate that only 10% of the total city has been uncovered.

In 2010, Pennsylvania State University researchers, Christopher Duffy and Kirk French, identified the Piedras Bolas Aqueduct as a pressurised aqueduct, the earliest known in the New World. It is a spring-fed conduit located on steep terrain that has a restricted outlet that would cause the water to exit forcefully, under pressure, to a height of 6 metres (20 ft). They were unable to identify the use for this man-made feature.

In June 2022, archaeologists from the Mexico's National Institute of Anthropology and History (INAH) announced the discovery of a 1,300-year-old nine-inch-tall stucco head statue in a pond, believed to be a young Hun Hunahpu, the Maya's mythological maize god. The figure's semi-shaved haircut that resembles ripe corn was the reason they identified it as a young maize god. Researchers assume that the Maya inhabitants of Palenque possibly placed a large stone statuette over a pond to represent the entrance to the underworld. According to archaeologist Arnoldo González Cruz, the Maya people symbolically shuttered the pool by breaking up some of the stucco and filling it with animal remains, including pottery fragments, carved bone remains, shells, obsidian arrowheads, beads, vegetables, and other items.

== Paleontological significance ==
Research inside the temples of Palenque has revealed the presence of numerous extremely well-preserved fossils of marine fish and invertebrates in the limestone slabs used to build the temples, as well as in the former quarries that this limestone was mined in. The existence of these fossils was known since the 19th century, but they only received significant scientific and archeological attention since the 2000s. These fossils have been dated to the Tenejapa-Lacandón Formation of the Early Paleocene, shortly after the Cretaceous-Paleogene extinction event, and document the recovery of marine ecosystems following the extinction, including the development of modern coral reefs. Fossils include some of the earliest representatives of modern reef fish, such as serranids (Paleoserranus), damselfish (Chaychanus), and syngnathiforms (Eekaulostomus), in addition to some of the last members of extinct groups such as pycnodontids. This diverse ecosystem existed despite the area being relatively close to the impact site of the Chicxulub meteor, which caused the extinction in the first place. The Maya residents of the area appear to have been well aware of these fossils and actively collected them, including by using fossil shark teeth and ray spines from the nearby Miocene Tulijá Formation as cutting tools, painting some of the fish skeletons, and cutting the slabs to display the fossils better, making them among the earliest known paleontologists.

== Palenque National Park ==
'Palenque National Parkʼ was designated in 1981 by the Mexican government. It covers an area of 17.72 km^{2}, which encompasses the ancient city and the hills to the south. The park includes a family camp site.

== See also ==
- List of Mesoamerican pyramids
- List of megalithic sites
- Maya script
- Temple 20
