= Tz'akbu Ajaw =

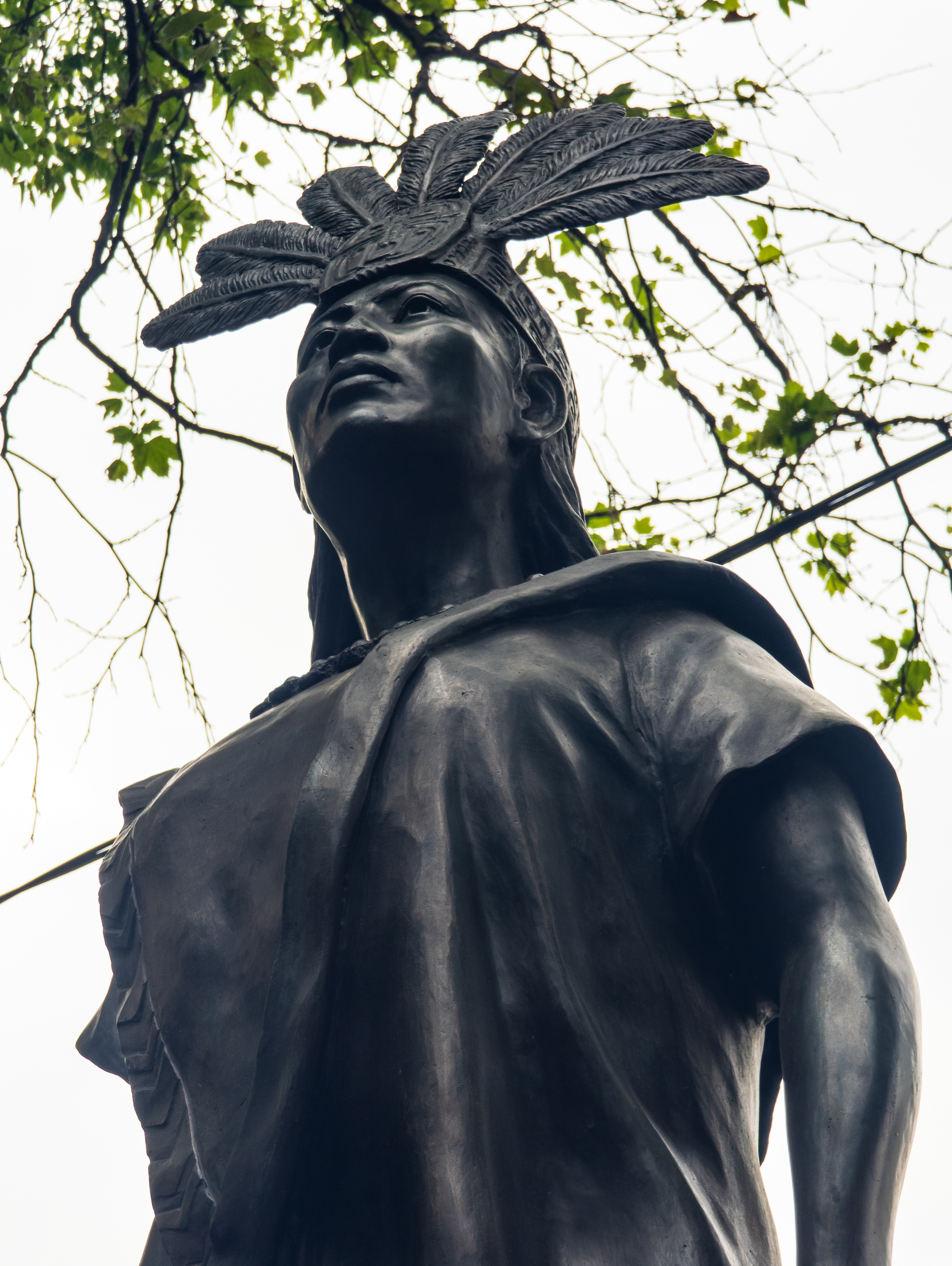
A sculpture of Tz'akbu Ajaw along Mexico City's Paseo de la Reforma

Tz'akbu Ajaw or Ahpo-Hel (c. 610–16 – c. November 672) was the wife of the ajaw K'inich Janaab' Pakal, known as Pacal the Great, who governed the Maya city-state of Palenque. She is sometimes known as Ix Tz'akbu Ajaw (Lady Tz'akbu Ajaw or Lady of the Succession).

== Biography ==
It is thought that Tz'akbu Ajaw was born sometime between 610 and 616 in the Maya city of Ox Te' Kuh, located on the plains of the present-day Mexican state of Tabasco. The area's capital was Lakam Ha' (Place of Great Waters), today known as the Palenque archaeological zone. Her father was Yax Itzam Aat, a second-order ruler, whose title was tuun ajaw, or, Ruler of the Precious Stone.

On March 19 or 22 of the year 626, she came to Palenque to marry the ajaw K'inich Janaab' Pakal, known as Pacal the Great, and she went on to govern alongside him. Their marriage brought together the two powerful political families. The couple had three sons, two of whom became rulers themselves: K'inich Kan Balam II, who was born in 635, and K'inich K'an Joy Chitam II, born in 644. Her third son, Tiwol Chan Mat, was born in 648; while he did not live to attain power himself, he was the father of K'inich Ahkal Mo' Nahb III, who ruled from 721 to 729.

An iconographic representation of Tz'akbu Ajaw is found on the Palenque Palace Panel (Tablero del Palacio), alongside her son Joy Chitam and her husband, Pacal the Great. All three are seated on thrones of mythical creation during an enthronement ceremony. She is distinguished in the scene by bearing warrior insignias of a flint and shield, which she passes to her son. Another tablet with representations of these three figures is held at the Dumbarton Oaks museum in Washington, D.C.

Tz'akbu Ajaw has been described as exemplifying "the significance and power that came to be wielded by the women of the ruling elites" in Maya society. She died in 672, somewhere around the age of 55 or 60.

Various studies of the skeleton found within the Tomb of the Red Queen at Palenque, uncovered in 1994 by Fanny López Jiménez and Arnoldo González Cruz, support the hypothesis that these human remains belong to Tz'akbu Ajaw. The richness of her burial site indicates the significant power and status that she held in life.
