= Vermilion =

Red color from powdered cinnabar (HgS)

Vermilion (cinnabar)

Color coordinates
- Hex triplet: #FF4000
- sRGB^{B} (r, g, b): (255, 64, 0)
- HSV (h, s, v): (15°, 100%, 100%)
- CIELCh_{uv} (L, C, h): (57, 160, 16°)
- Source: Maerz and Paul (Note: The color displayed in the color box above matches the color called vermilion in the 1930 book by Maerz and Paul A Dictionary of Color New York:1930 McGraw-Hill; the color vermilion is displayed on page 27, Plate 2, Color Sample L11. It is noted on page 193 that the color cinnabar is another name for the color vermilion.)
- ISCC–NBS descriptor: Vivid reddish orange
- B: Normalized to [0–255] (byte)

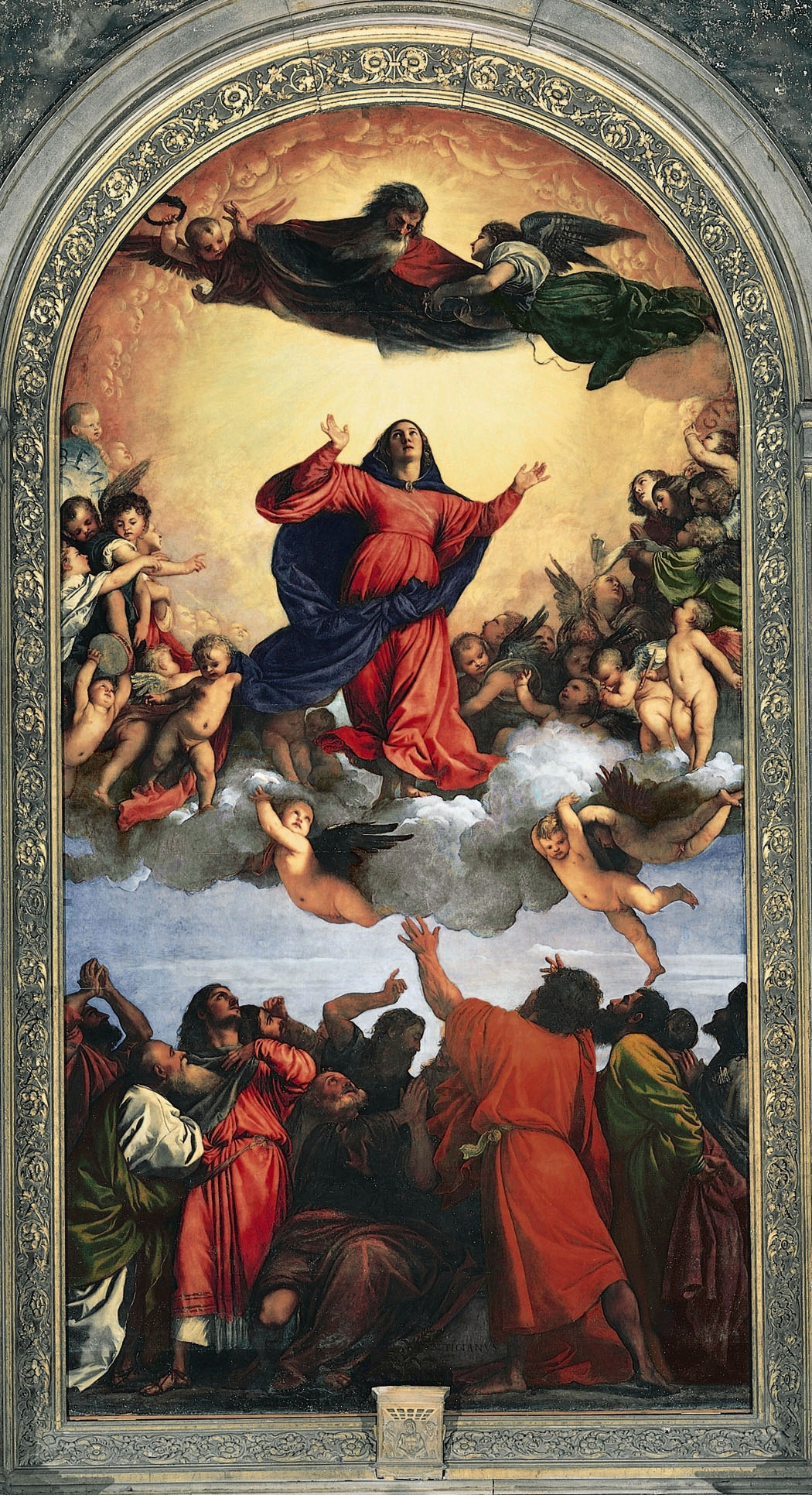
The Venetian painter Titian used vermilion for dramatic effect. In the Assumption of the Virgin (1516–18), the vermilion robes draw the eye to the main characters.

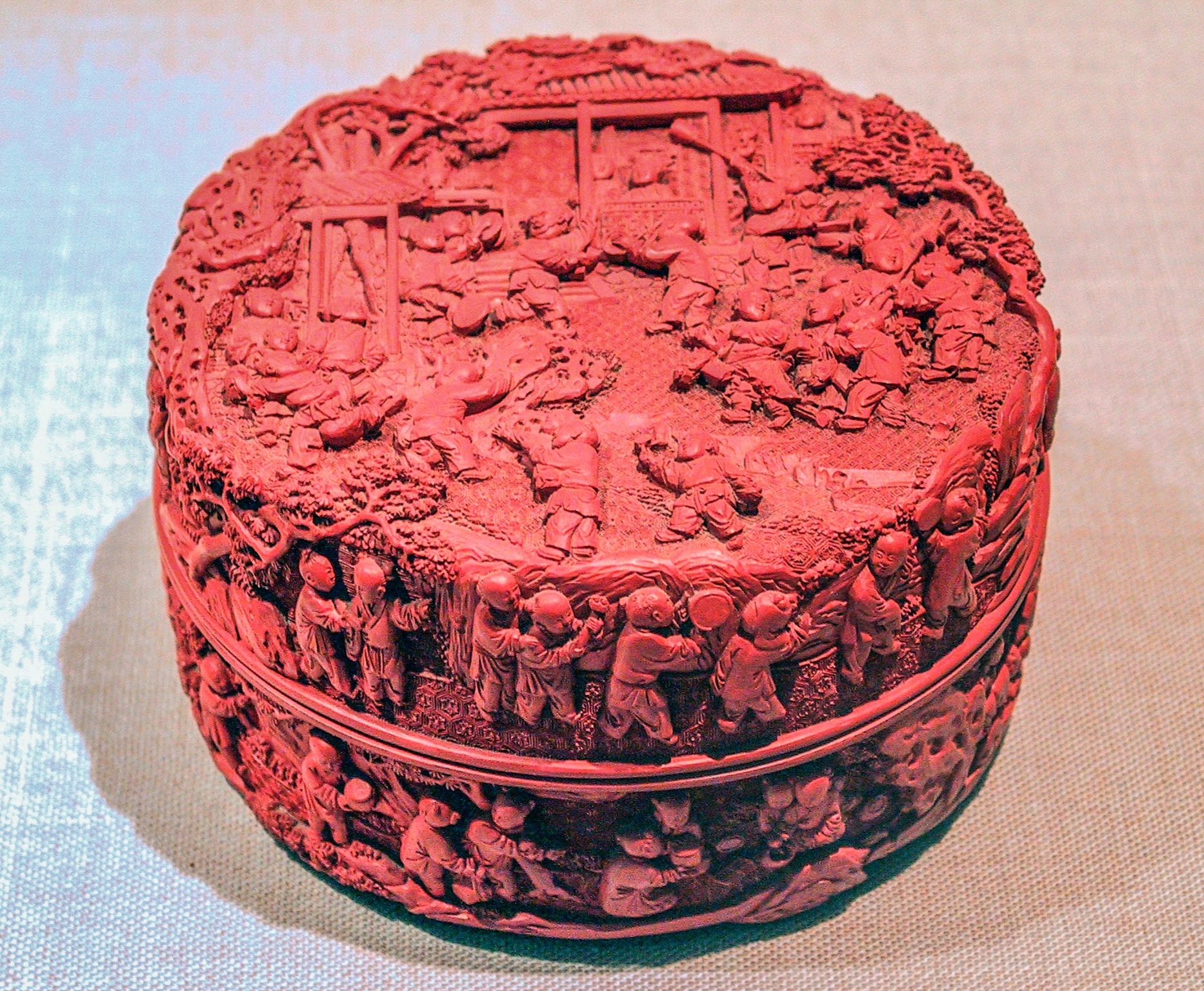
A Chinese "cinnabar red" carved lacquer box from the Qing dynasty (1736–1795), National Museum of China, Beijing

Vermilion (sometimes spelled vermillion) is a color family and toxic pigment most often used between antiquity and the 19th century and made from the powdered mineral cinnabar (a form of mercury sulfide). It is synonymous with red orange.

== Etymology and common name ==
"Vermilion" is attested as a color name in English in 1289. It comes from Old French vermeillon, derived from vermeil, from Latin vermiculus – the diminutive of vermis 'worm'.

The name refers to the color of the red dye kermes made from the insect Kermes vermilio, which was widely used in Europe.

== Chemistry and manufacture ==
Vermilion is a dense, opaque pigment with a clear, brilliant hue. The pigment was originally made by grinding a powder of cinnabar (mercury sulfide). Like most mercury compounds, it is toxic.

Vermilion is not a specific hue; mercuric sulfides make a range of warm hues, from bright orange-red to a duller reddish-purple that resembles fresh liver. Differences in hue are caused by the size of the pigment particles: larger crystals produce duller and less orange hues.

Cinnabar pigment was a side product of the mining of mercury, and mining cinnabar was difficult, expensive, and dangerous, because of the toxicity of mercury. Greek philosopher Theophrastus of Eresus (371–286 BC) described the process in De Lapidibus, the first scientific book on minerals. Efforts began early to find a better way to make the pigment.

The Chinese were probably the first to make a synthetic vermilion as early as the fourth century BC. The Greek alchemist Zosimus of Panopolis (third–fourth century AD) wrote of such a method. In the early 9th century, the process was accurately described by Persian alchemist Jabir ibn Hayyan (722–804) in his book of recipes of colors, and the process began to be widely used in Europe.

The process described by Jabir ibn Hayyan was:

- Mix mercury with sulfur to form aethiopes mineralis, a black compound of mercury sulfide.
- Heat this in a flask (the compound vaporizes and recondenses in the top of the flask).
- Break the flask.
- Collect the vermilion and grind it.

When first created, the material is almost black. As it is ground, the red color appears. The longer the compound is ground, the finer the color becomes. Italian Renaissance artist Cennino Cennini wrote: "If you were to grind it every day, even for 20 years, it would keep getting better and more perfect."

In the 17th century, a new method of making the pigment was introduced, known as the Dutch method. Mercury and melted sulfur were mashed to make black mercury sulfide, then heated in a retort, producing vapors condensing as a bright, red mercury sulfide. To remove the sulfur, these crystals were treated with a strong alkali, washed, and finally ground under water to yield the commercial powder form of the pigment. The pigment is still made today using essentially the same process.

Vermilion has one important defect; it is liable to darken, or develop a purplish-gray surface sheen. Cennino Cennini wrote, "Bear in mind ... that it is not in its character to be exposed to air, but it is more resistant on panel than on walls since, when it is used and laid on a wall, over a period of time, standing in the air, it turns black." Newer research indicates that chlorine ions and light may aid in decomposing vermilion into elemental mercury, which is black when in finely dispersed form.

Vermilion was the primary red pigment used by European painters, from the Renaissance until the 20th century. Because of its cost and toxicity, though, it was almost entirely replaced by a new synthetic pigment, cadmium red, in the 20th century. As cadmium can also be toxic, some scientists propose replacing this with solid solutions of the perovskites CaTaO_{2}N and LaTaON_{2}.

Genuine vermilion pigment today comes mostly from China; it is a synthetic mercuric sulfide, labeled on paint tubes as PR-106 (Red Pigment 106). The synthetic pigment is of higher quality than vermilion made from ground cinnabar, which has many impurities. The pigment is very toxic, and should be used with great care.

== Gallery ==
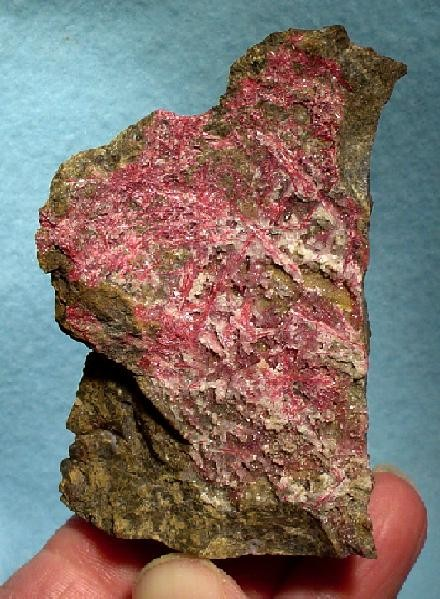
Cinnabar crystals from the Almaden Mine in northern California

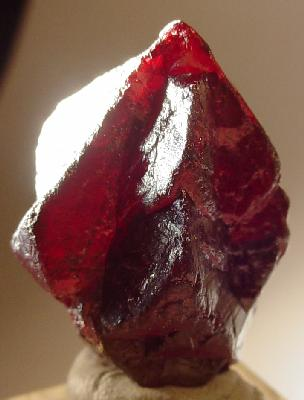
Cinnabar crystals on dolomite from Tongren Prefecture, Guizhou, China

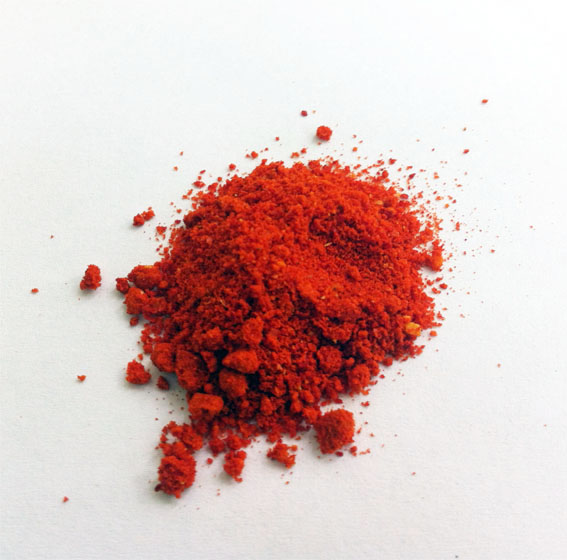
Vermilion pigment, traditionally derived from cinnabar.

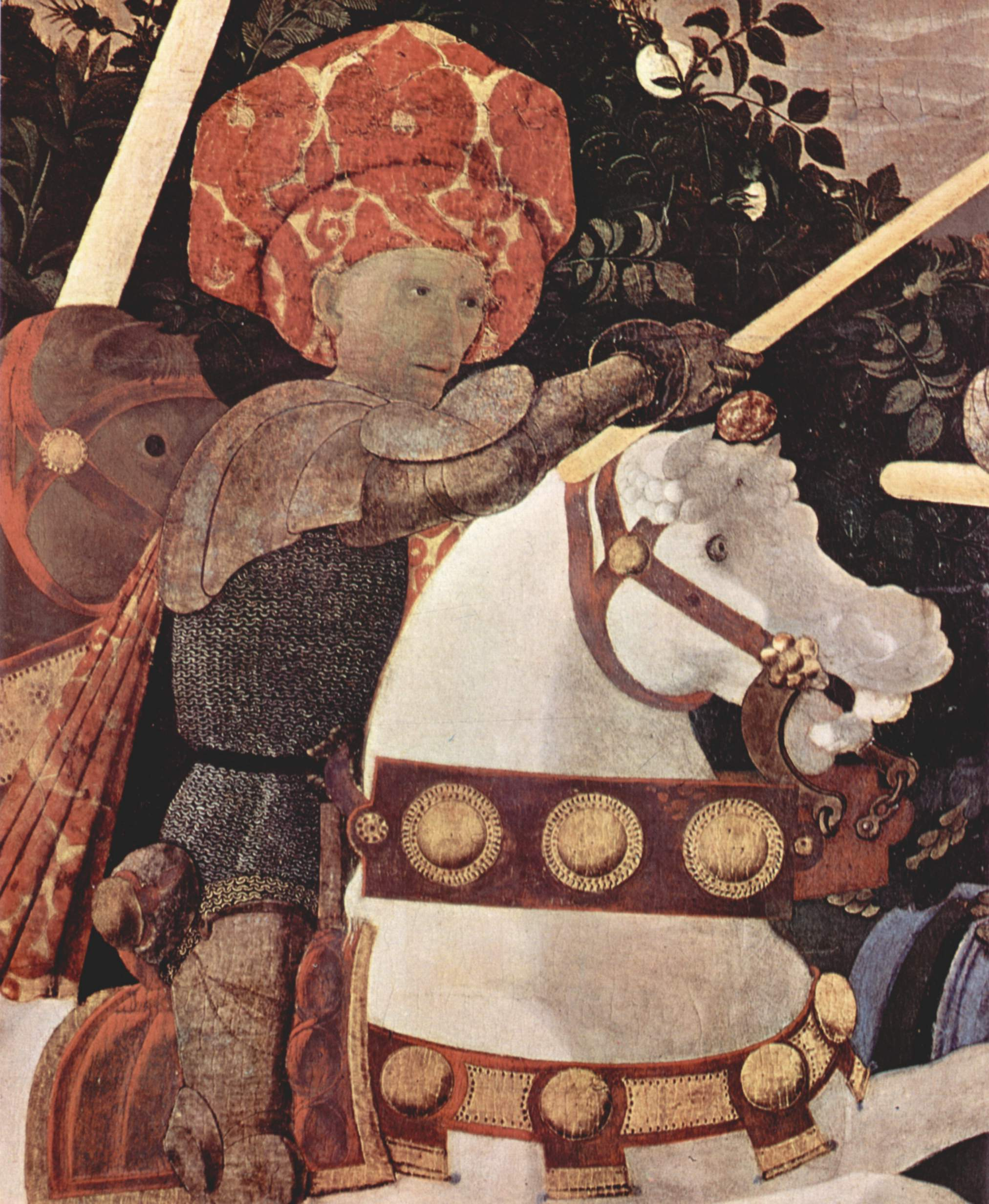
Vermilion darkens with time. The bridle in Ucello's Battle of San Romano has turned dark brown.

== History ==
The colors are widely used in the art and decoration of Ancient Rome and the Byzantine Empire, then in the illuminated manuscripts of the Middle Ages, in the paintings of the Renaissance, and in the art and lacquerware of China.

=== Antiquity ===
The first documented use of vermilion pigment, made with ground cinnabar, dates to 8000–7000 BC, and was found at the Neolithic village of Çatalhöyük, in modern-day Turkey. Cinnabar was mined in Spain beginning in about 5300 BC. In China, the first documented use of cinnabar as a pigment was by the Yangshao culture (5000–4000 BC), where it was used to paint ceramics, to cover the walls and floors of rooms, and for ritual ceremonies.

The principal source of cinnabar for the ancient Romans was the Almaden mine in south-centeal Spain, which was worked by prisoners. Since the ore of mercury was highly toxic, a term in the mines was a near-guaranteed death sentence. Pliny the Elder described the mines this way:

Nothing is more carefully guarded. It is forbidden to break up or refine the cinnabar on the spot. They send it to Rome in its natural condition, under seal, to the extent of some ten thousand librae (Roman pounds thus 3289 kg) a year. The sales price is fixed by law to keep it from becoming impossibly expensive, and the price fixed is seventy sesterces a pound.

In Rome, the precious pigment was used to paint frescoes, decorate statues, and even as a cosmetic. In Roman triumphs, the victors had their faces covered with vermilion powder, and the face of Jupiter on the Capitoline Hill was also colored vermilion. Cinnabar was used to paint the walls of some of the most luxurious villas in Pompeii, including the Villa of the Mysteries (Italian: Villa dei Misteri). Pliny reported its painters stole a large portion of the expensive pigment by frequently washing their brushes and saving the wash water.

In the Byzantine Empire, the use of cinnabar/the vermilion color was reserved for the use of the imperial family and administrators; official letters and imperial decrees were written in vermilion ink, made with cinnabar.

=== In India ===
Vermilion is known in the Hindu religion as sindoor. It is commonly used by married Hindu women in India.

=== In the Americas ===
Vermilion was also used by the native peoples of America, to paint ceramics, figurines, and murals, and for the decoration of burials. It was used in the Chavin civilization (400 BC – 200 AD), and in the Maya, Sican, Moche, and Inca empires. The major source was the Huancavelica mine in the Andes mountains in central Peru.

The most dramatic example of vermilion use in the Americas was the so-called Tomb of the Red Queen, located in Temple XIII, in the ruins of the Mayan city of Palenque in Chiapas, Mexico. The temple is dated to between 600 and 700 AD. It was discovered in 1994 by Mexican archeologist Fanny López Jiménez. The body and all objects in the sarcophagus were covered with bright red vermilion powder made from cinnabar.

=== In the Middle Ages and Renaissance ===
The technique for making a synthetic vermilion by combining sulfur and mercury was in use in Europe in the 9th century, but the pigment was still expensive. Since it was almost as expensive as gold leaf, it was used only in the most important decoration of illuminated manuscripts, while the less expensive minium, made with red lead, was used for the red letters and symbols in the text.

Vermilion was also used by painters in the Renaissance as a very vivid and bright red, though it did have the weakness of sometimes turning dark with time. Florentine artist Cennino Cennini described it in his handbook for artists:

This pigment is made by alchemy, prepared in a retort, which subject I will leave be since to put every method and recipe into my discussion would be too longwinded. The reason? Because if you care to take the trouble, you will find a lot of recipes for it, and particularly if you cultivate friendships with monks. But, so that you do not waste your time with the many different techniques, I advise you, just take what you can find at the apothecary's for your money. And I want to teach you how to buy it and how to recognise the good vermilion. Always buy solid vermilion and not crushed or ground. The reason? Because more often than not you are cheated either with red lead or crushed brick.

By the 20th century, the cost and toxicity of vermilion led to its gradually being replaced by synthetic pigments, particularly cadmium red, which had a comparable color and opacity.

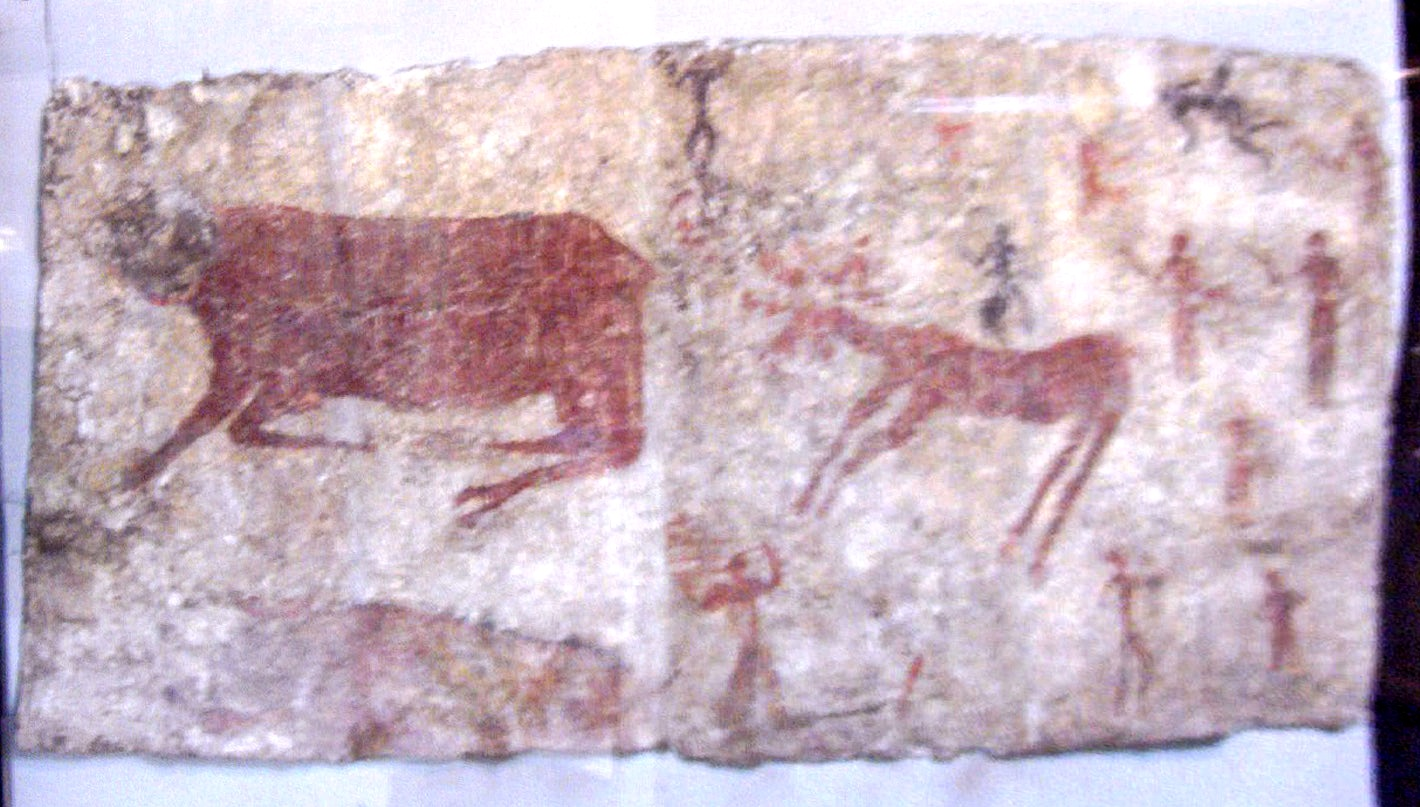
The first documented use of cinnabar or vermilion pigment was found at the neolithic village of Çatalhöyük in modern-day Turkey. This mural, from 7000 to 8000 BC, shows aurochs, a deer, and humans. (Museum of Anatolian Civilizations, Ankara)

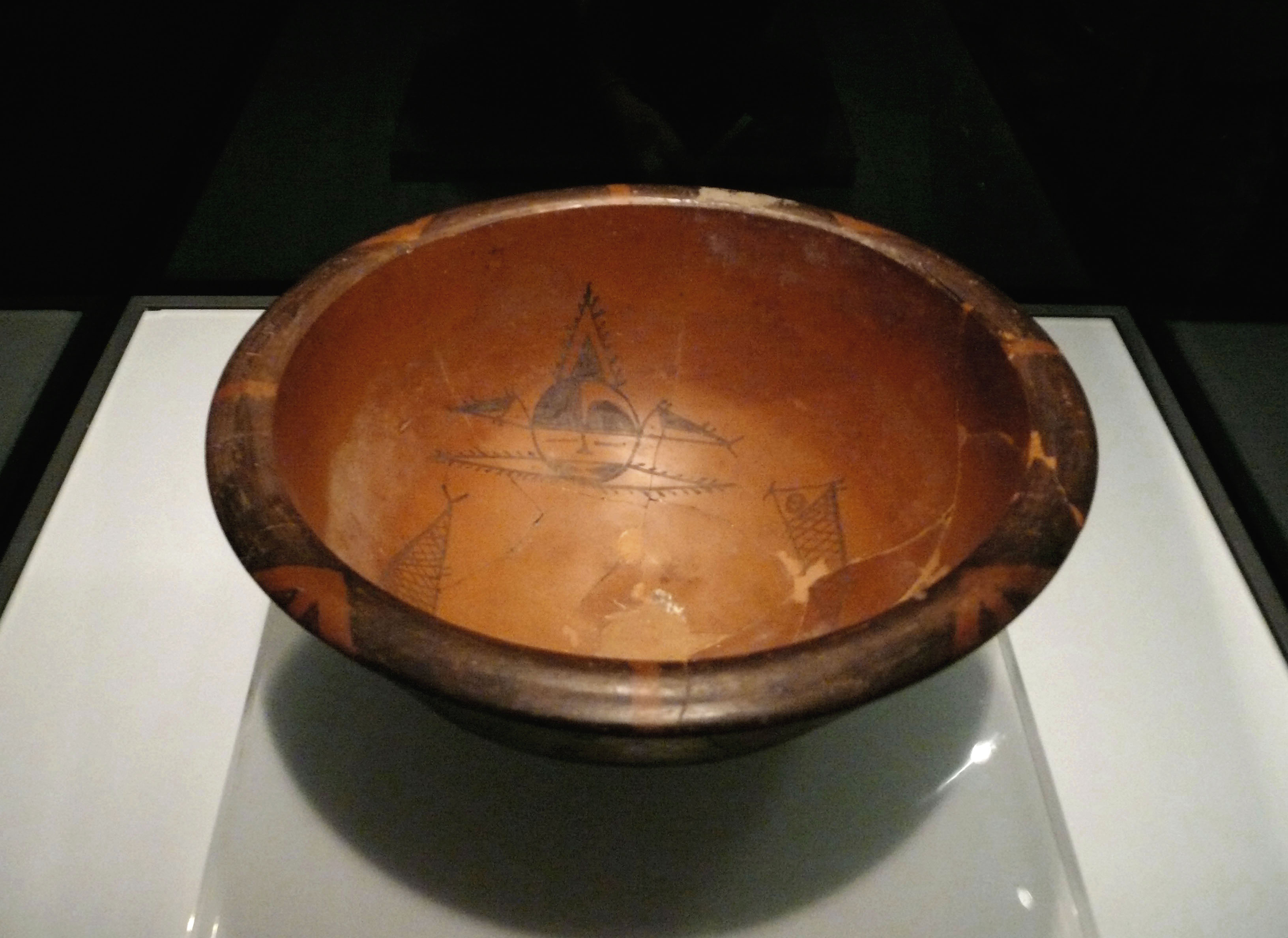
The first documented use of cinnabar, or vermilion, for decorating pottery in China dates to the Yangshao culture (5000–4000 BC). This bowl is from Banpo Village, Shaanxi, China.

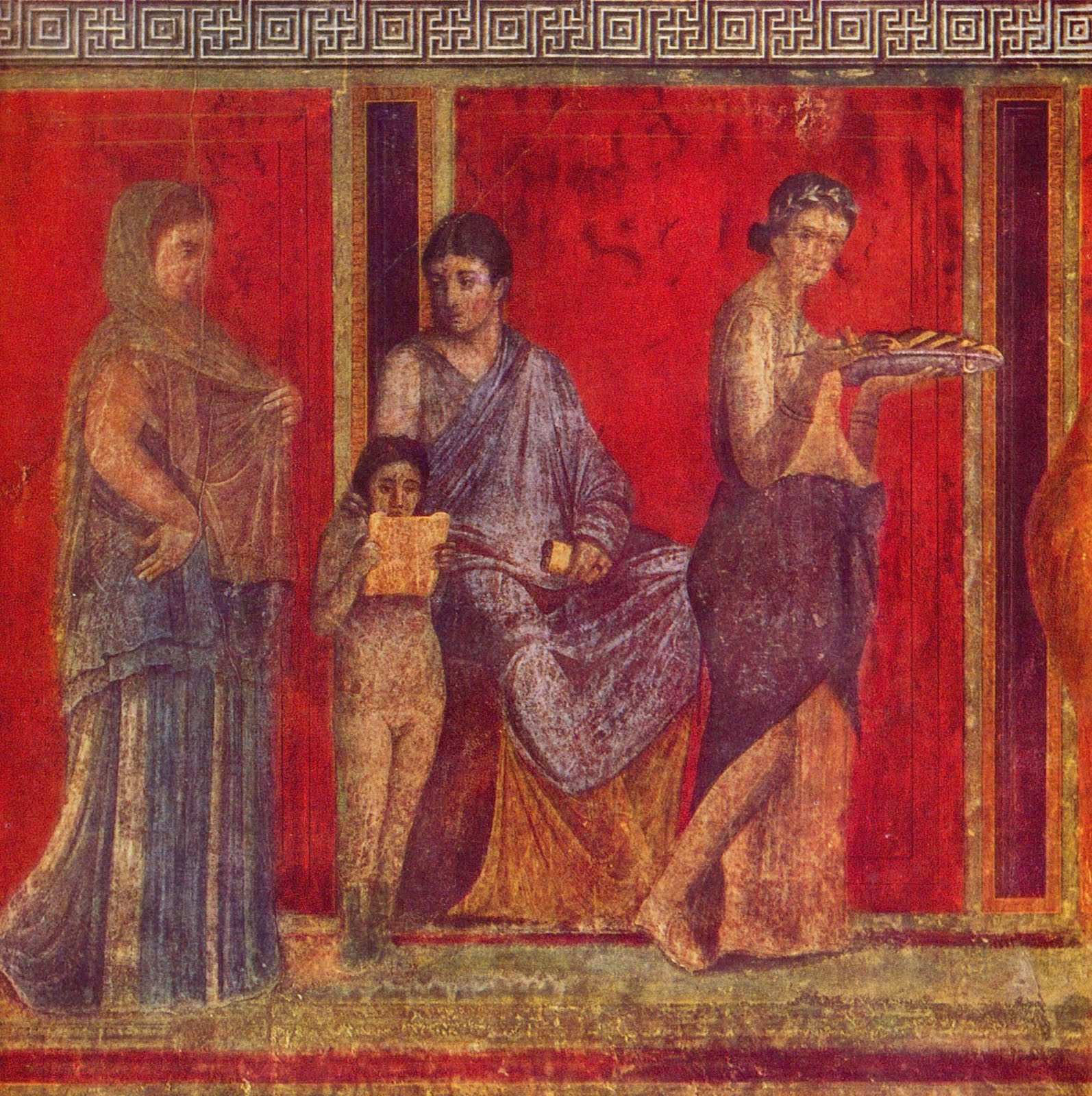
The Villa of the Mysteries in Pompeii was a showcase for the expensive vermilion pigment made from ground cinnabar.

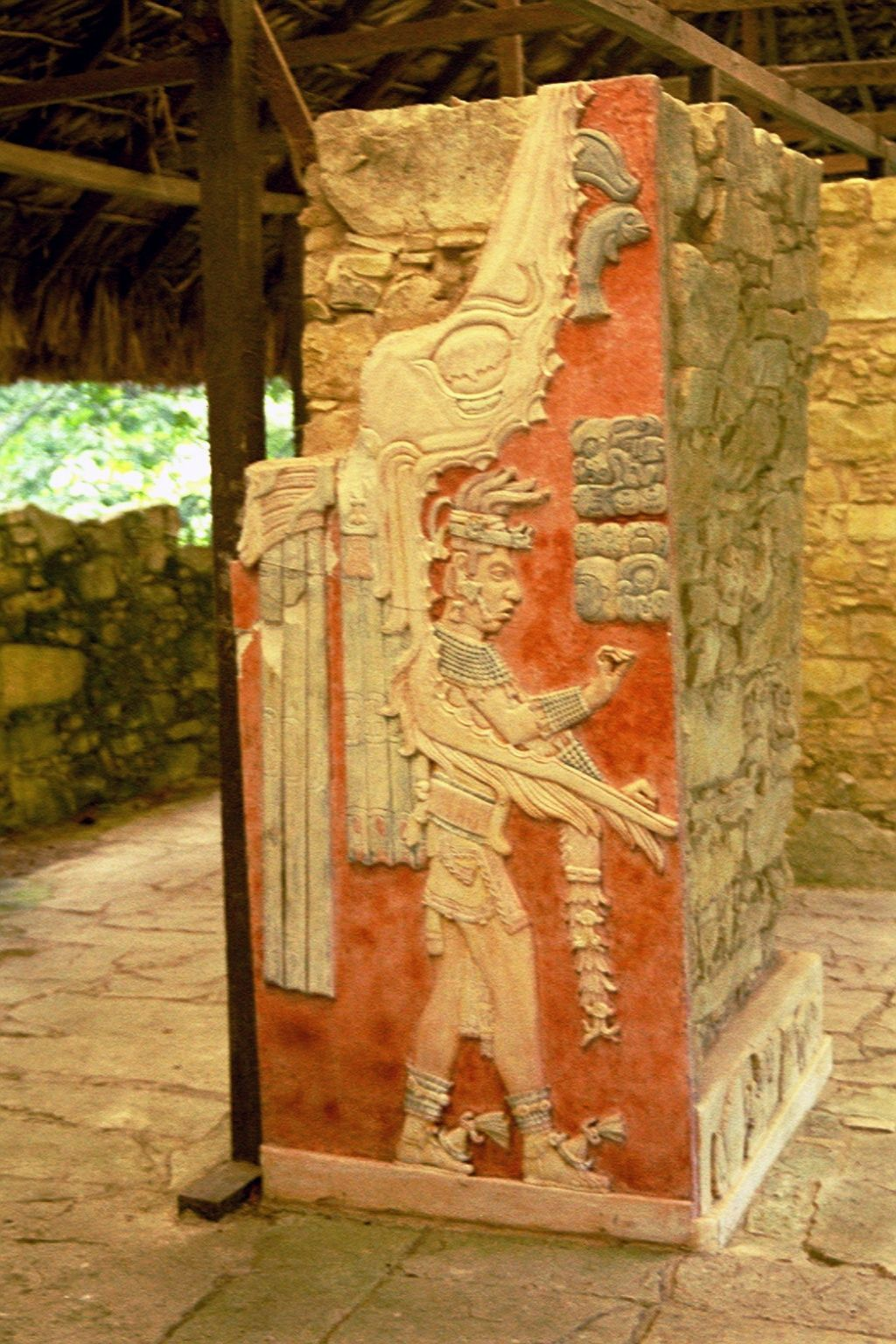
The walls of the tombs of Maya rulers were sometimes painted with cinnabar, and in the Tomb of the Red Queen in Palenque (600–700 AD), the remains of a noblewoman were covered with bright vermilion cinnabar powder.

=== Chinese red ===
In China, the color vermilion played an important role in national culture. The color was mostly used in creating Chinese lacquerware, which was exported around the world, giving rise to the term "Chinese red".

The lacquer came from the Chinese lacquer tree, or toxicodendron vernicifluum, a relative of poison ivy and poison sumac (not to be confused with sumac, which is in a different genus and is not toxic), which grew in regions of China, Korea, and Japan. The sap or resin of the tree, called urushiol, was caustic and toxic (it contained the same chemical compound as poison ivy), but painted onto wood or metal, it hardened into a fine natural plastic, or lacquer surface. The pure sap was dark brown, but beginning in about the third century BC, during the Han dynasty, Chinese artisans colored it with powdered cinnabar or with red ochre (ferric oxide), giving it an orange-red color. Beginning in about the 8th century, Chinese chemists began making synthetic vermilion from mercury and sulfur, which reduced the price of the pigment and allowed the production of Chinese lacquerware on a larger scale.

The shade of red of the lacquerware has changed over the centuries. During the Eastern Han dynasty (25–220 AD) the Chinese word for red referred to a light red. However, during the Tang dynasty (618–907), when the synthetic vermilion was introduced, that color became darker and richer. The poet Bai Juyi (772–846) wrote in a song poem praising Jiangnan, "the flowers by the river when the sun rises are redder than flames", and the word he used for red was the word for vermilion, or Chinese red.

When Chinese lacquerware and the ground cinnabar used to color it were exported to Europe in the 17th and 18th centuries, European collectors considered it to be finer than the European vermilion. In 1835, "Chinese vermilion" was described as a cinnabar so pure that it only had to be ground into powder to become a perfect vermilion. Historically, European vermilion often included adulterants including brick, orpiment, iron oxide, Persian red, iodine scarlet—and minium (red lead), an inexpensive and bright, but fugitive lead-oxide pigment.

Since ancient times, vermilion was regarded as the color of blood, thus the color of life. It was used to paint temples and the carriages of the emperor, and as the printing paste for personal seals. It was also used for unique red calligraphic ink reserved for emperors. Chinese Taoists associated vermilion with eternity.

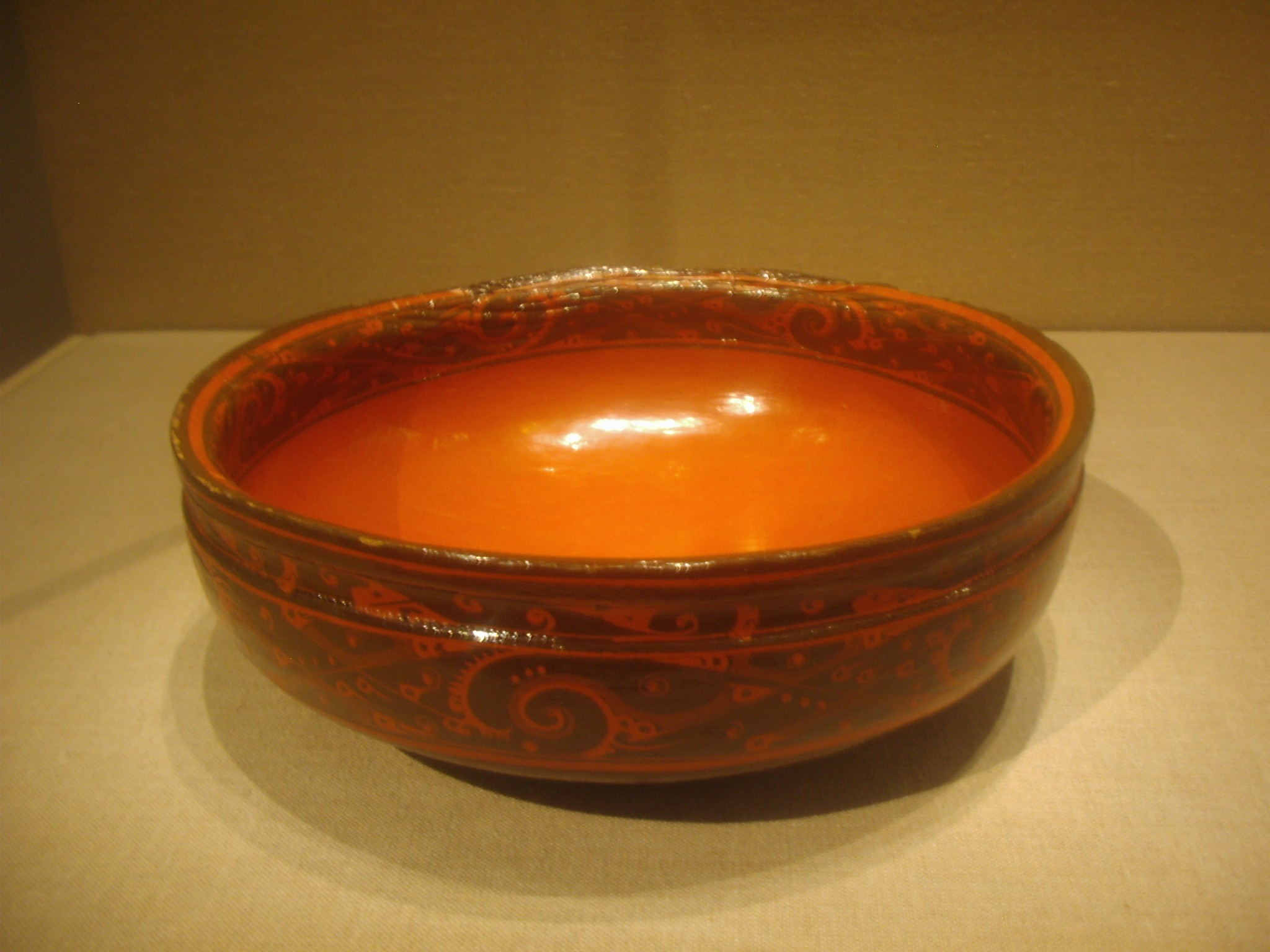
A lacquerware bowl from the Western Han dynasty, second century BC (Metropolitan Museum of Art, New York)

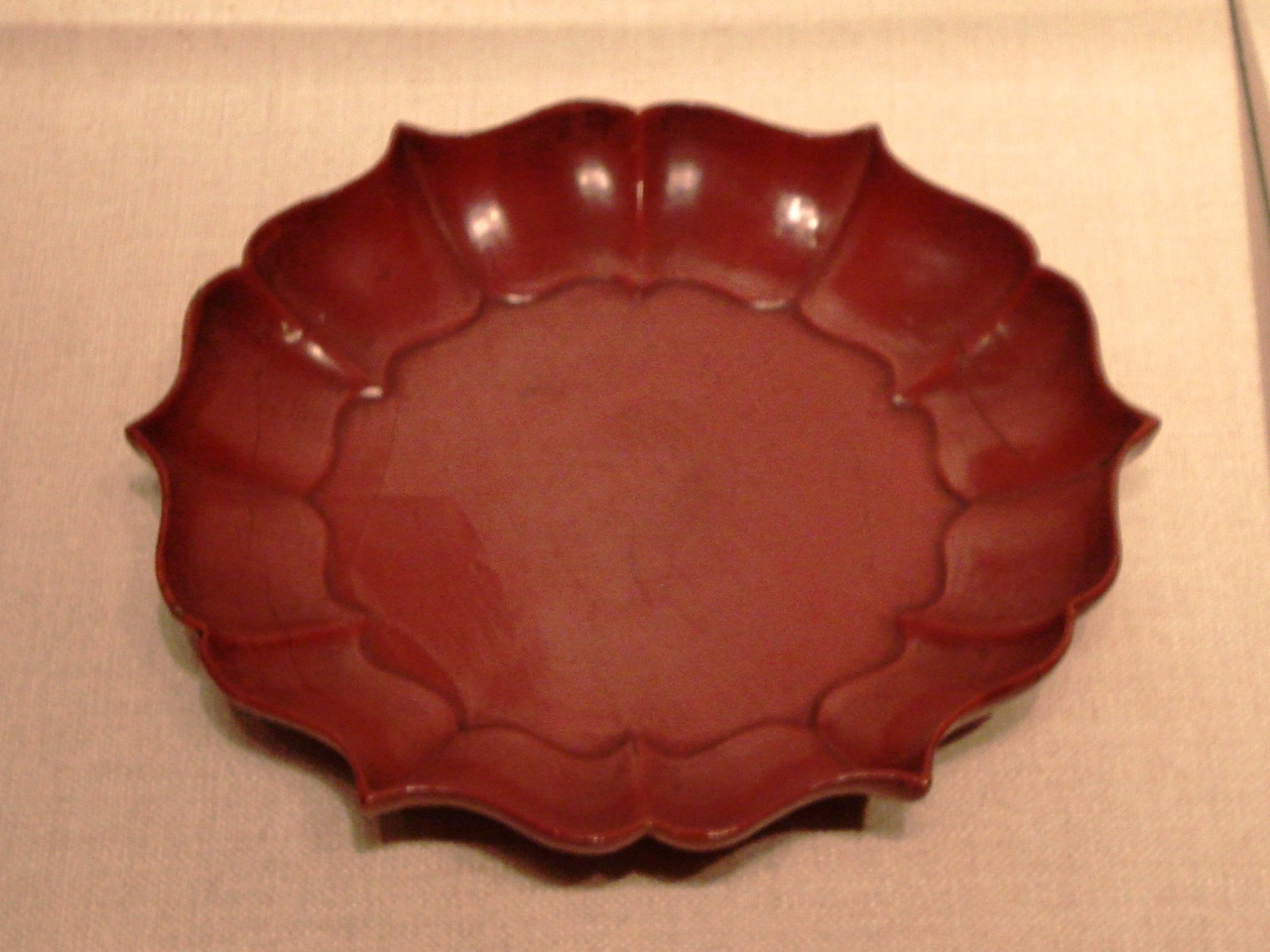
A lacquerware tray from the Song dynasty, 960–1279 (Freer and Sackler Galleries, Washington, DC)

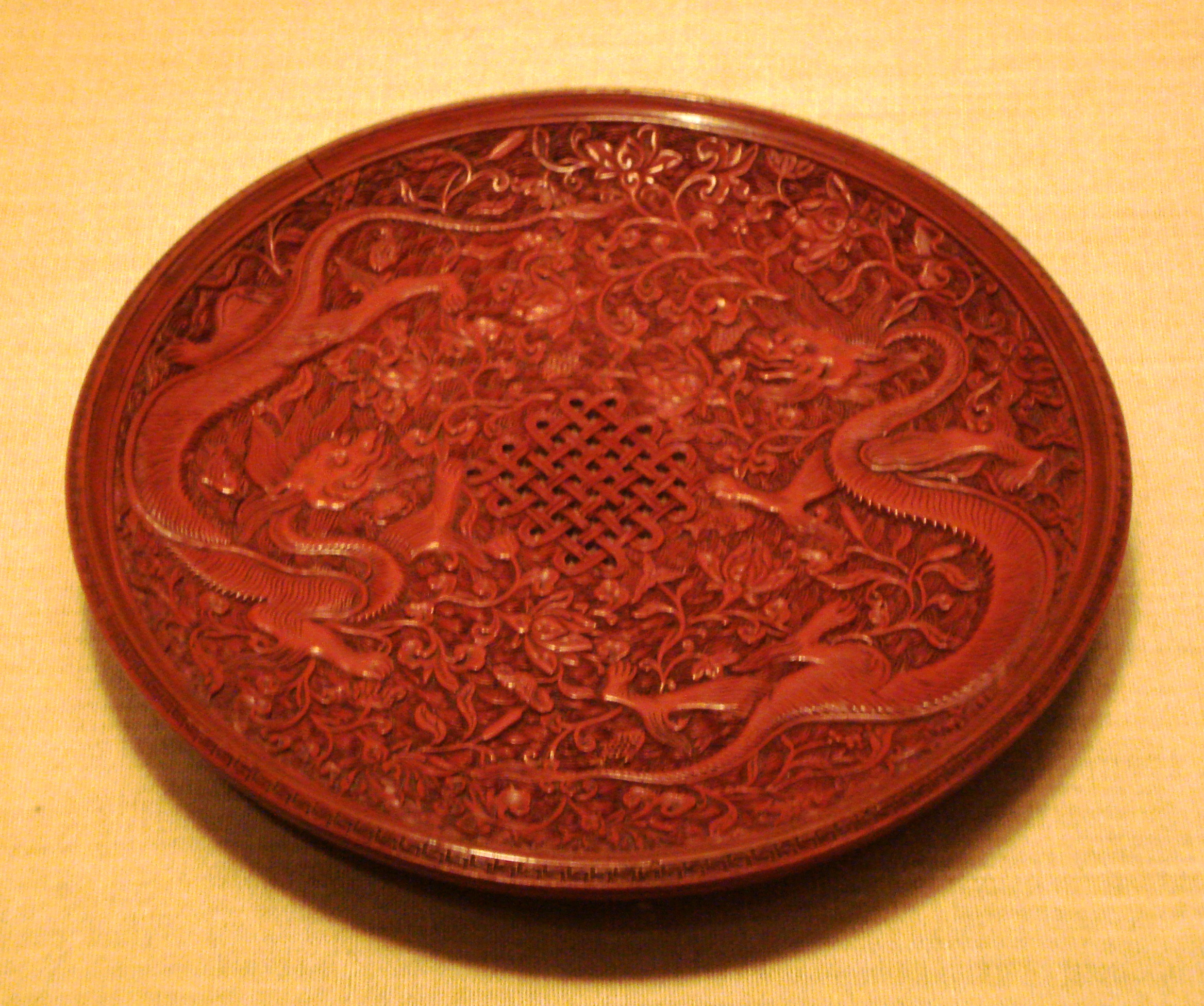
A lacquerware dish from the Ming dynasty, late 15th to mid-16th century (Freer and Sackler Galleries, Washington, DC)

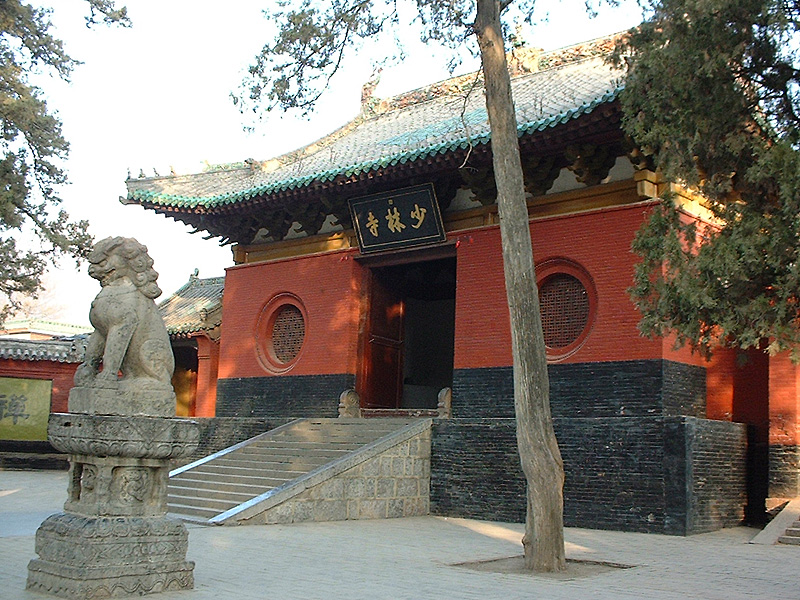
The main gate of the Shaolin Monastery in Dengfeng, Henan is painted vermilion or Chinese red.

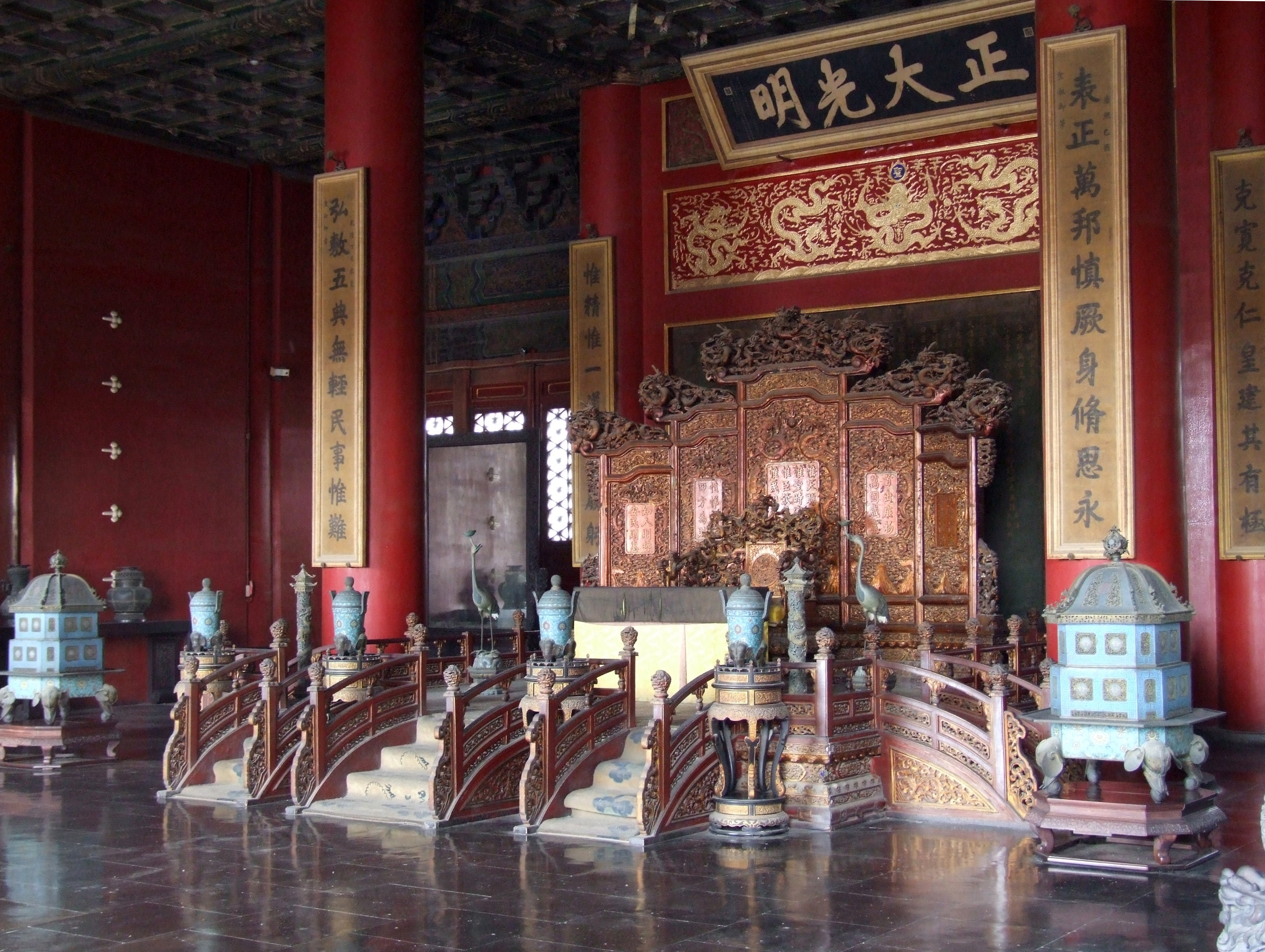
Vermilion columns in the throne room in the Palace of Heavenly Purity in the Forbidden City of Beijing

== In nature ==
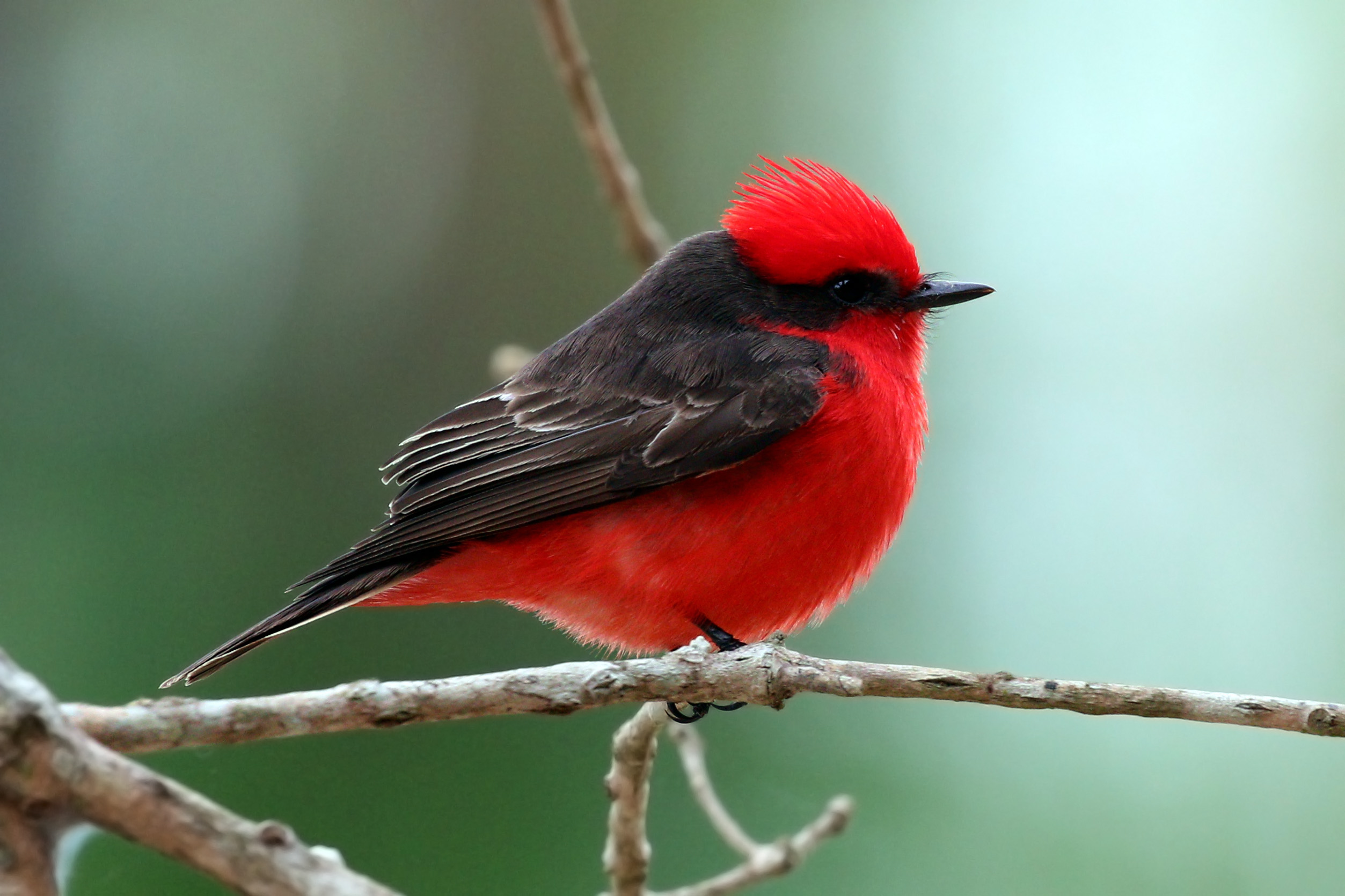
Vermilion flycatcher (male)

- Vermilion flycatcher
- Vermilion cardinal
- Vermilion tanager
- Lake Vermilion
- Vermilion snapper

== In art and culture ==
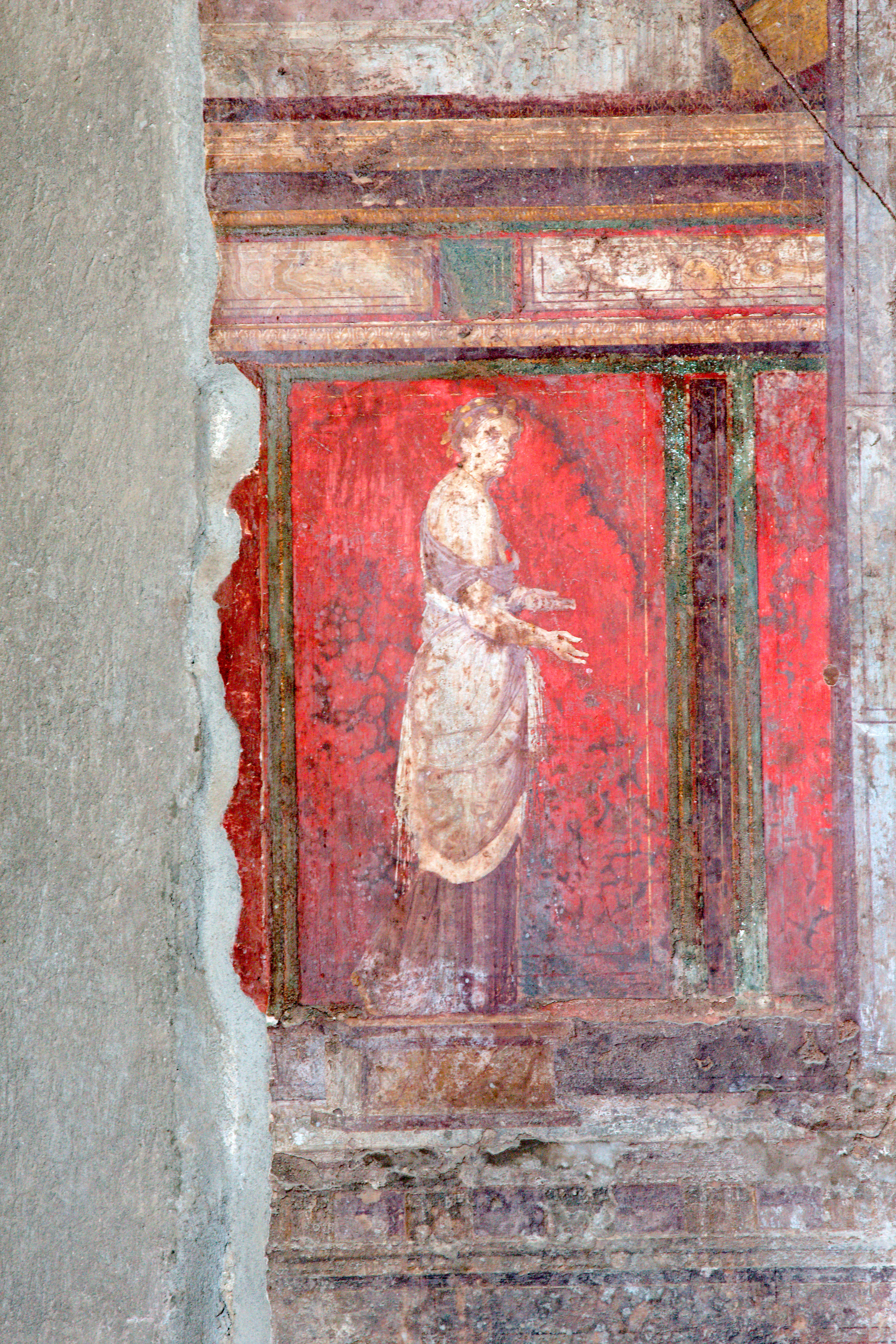
The bright vermilion murals in the Villa of Mysteries in Pompeii (before 79 AD) were painted with ground and powdered cinnabar, the most expensive red pigment of the time.

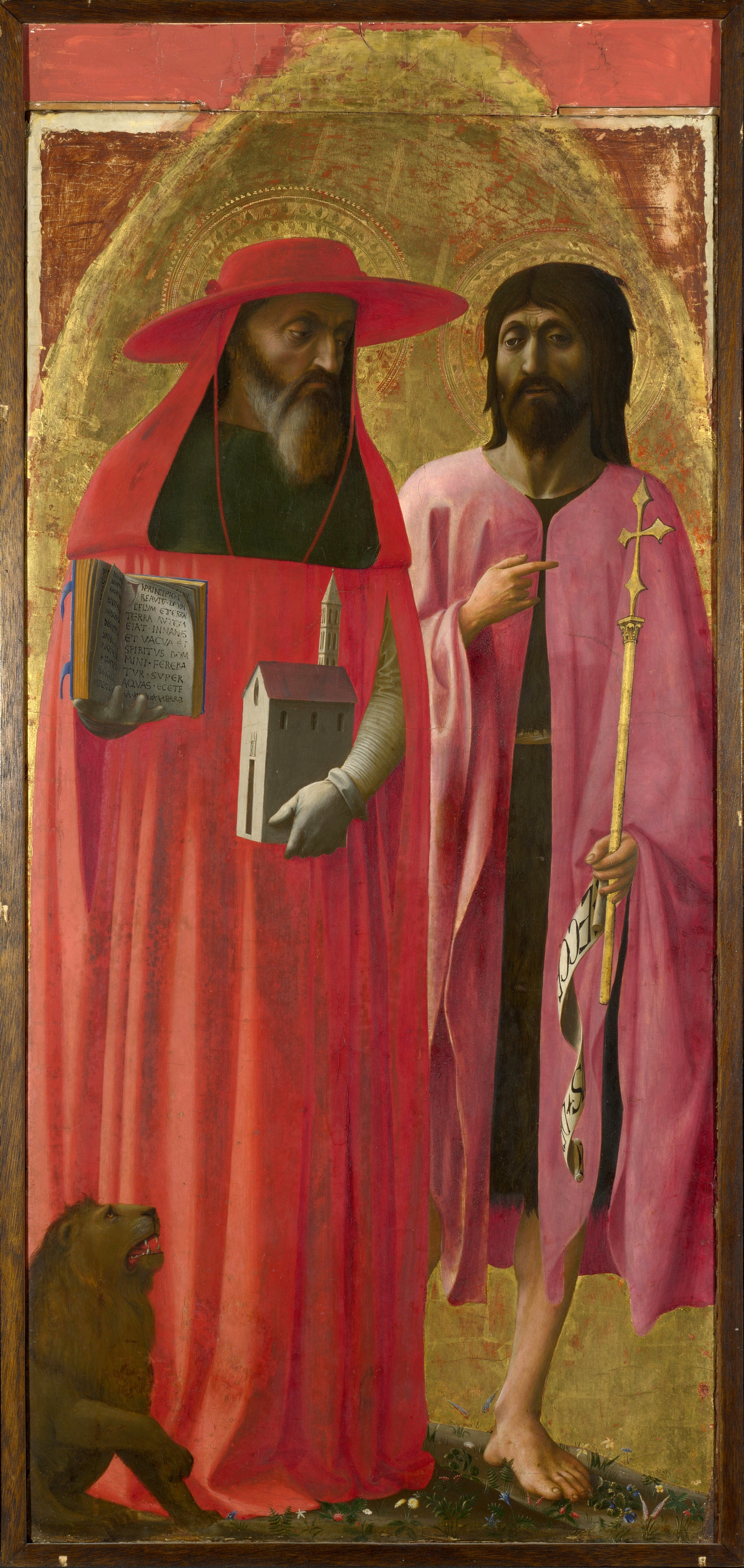
The painting of Saint Jerome by Masaccio (1428–29) featured a vivid robe painted with vermilion.

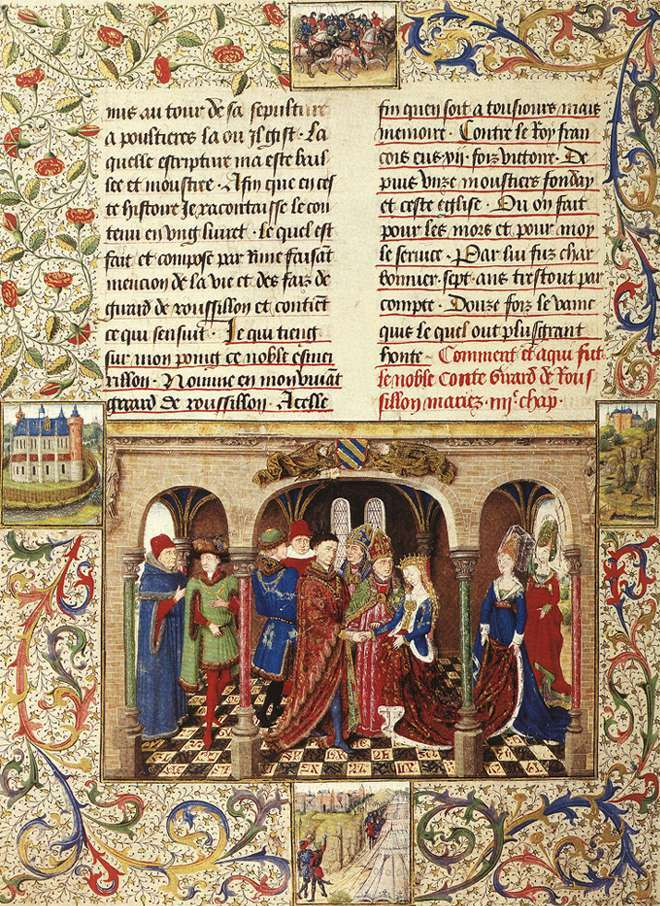
A page of the Roman de Girart de Roussillon (1450). Both vermilion and minium, or red lead, were used in Medieval manuscripts. Vermilion, as expensive as gilding, was usually reserved for the most important illustrations or designs.

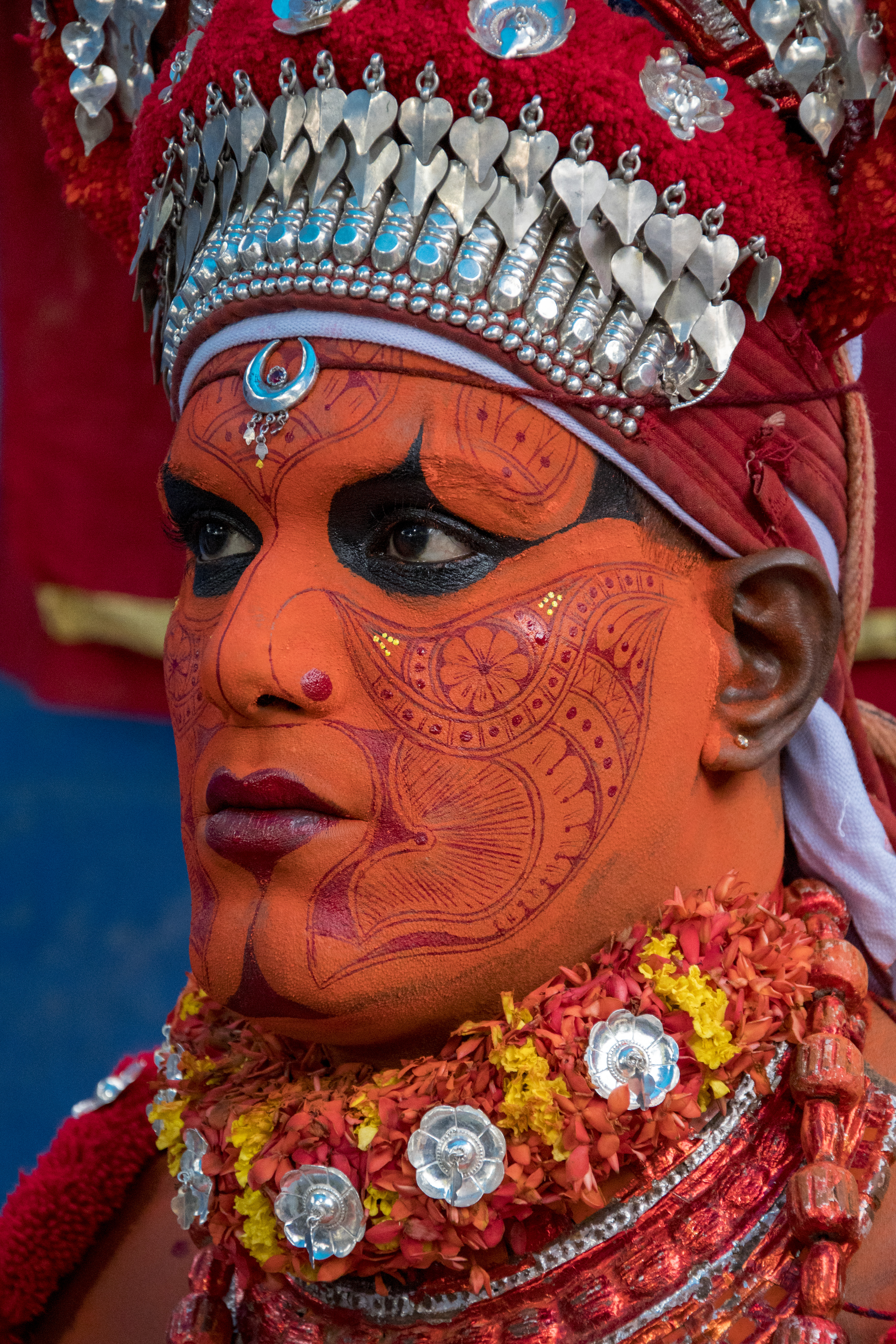
Theyyam of Kerala

=== Religion ===
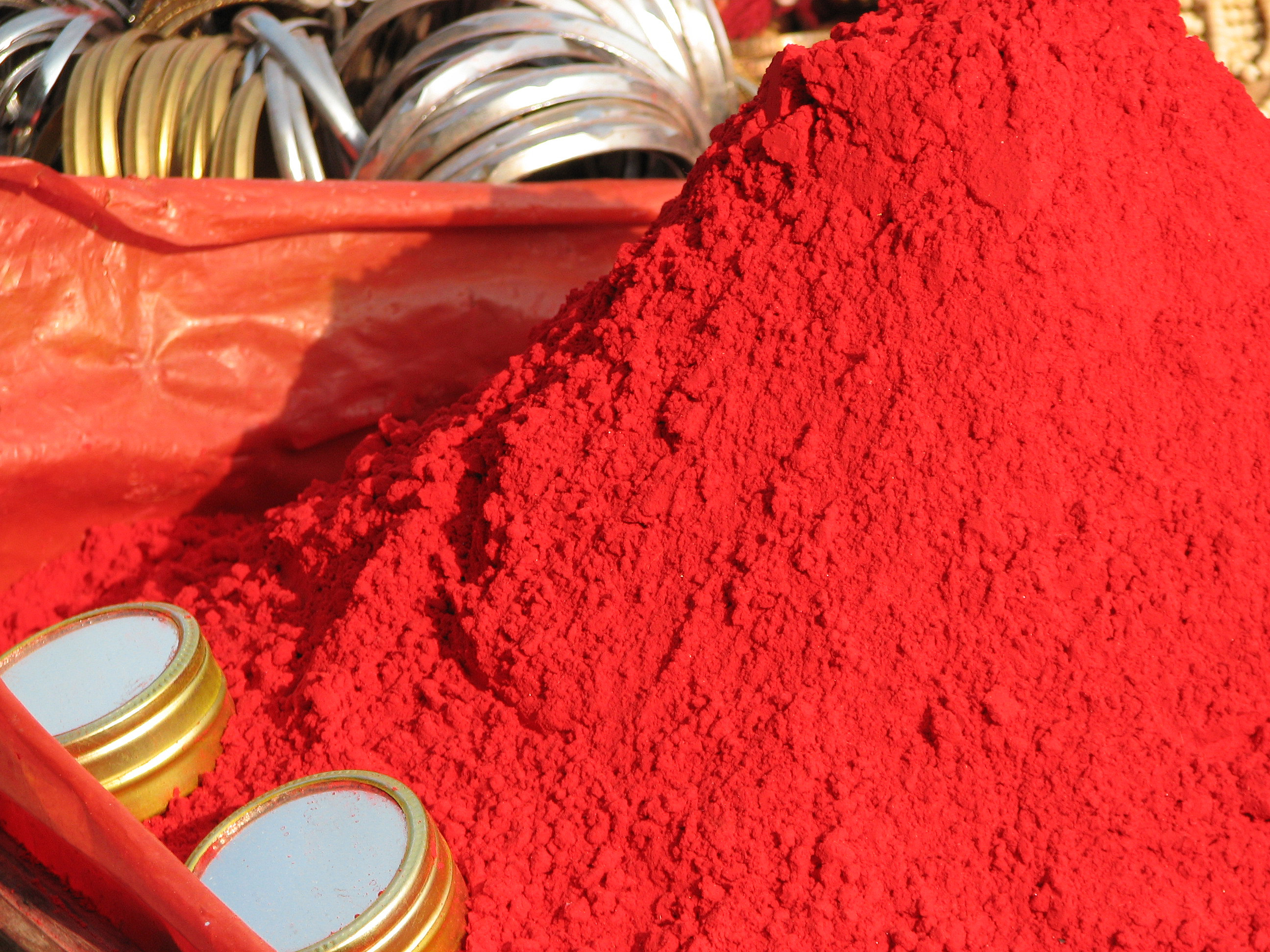
Sindoor is a vermilion-colored powder with which Hindu women make a mark in their hairline to indicate they are married.

- The Shaolin temple, where Buddhist monk Bodhidharma is reputed to have established the new sect of Chan Buddhism (Zen Buddhism), is colored a bright tone of vermilion. This temple was featured in the West by the 1972–1975 TV series Kung Fu.
- In the Bible, vermilion is listed as a pigment that was in use for painting buildings during the reign of Shallum the son of Josiah king of Judah, and is named in the book of the prophet Ezekiel as a pigment used in art that portrayed Chaldean men. (Jeremiah 22:11–14, Ezekiel 23:14–17)
- The vermilion rose is a symbol of the Blessed Virgin Mary.
- Hindu women use vermilion along the hair parting line known as sindoor, to signify that they are married. Hindu men and women often wear vermilion on their foreheads during religious ceremonies and festivals.

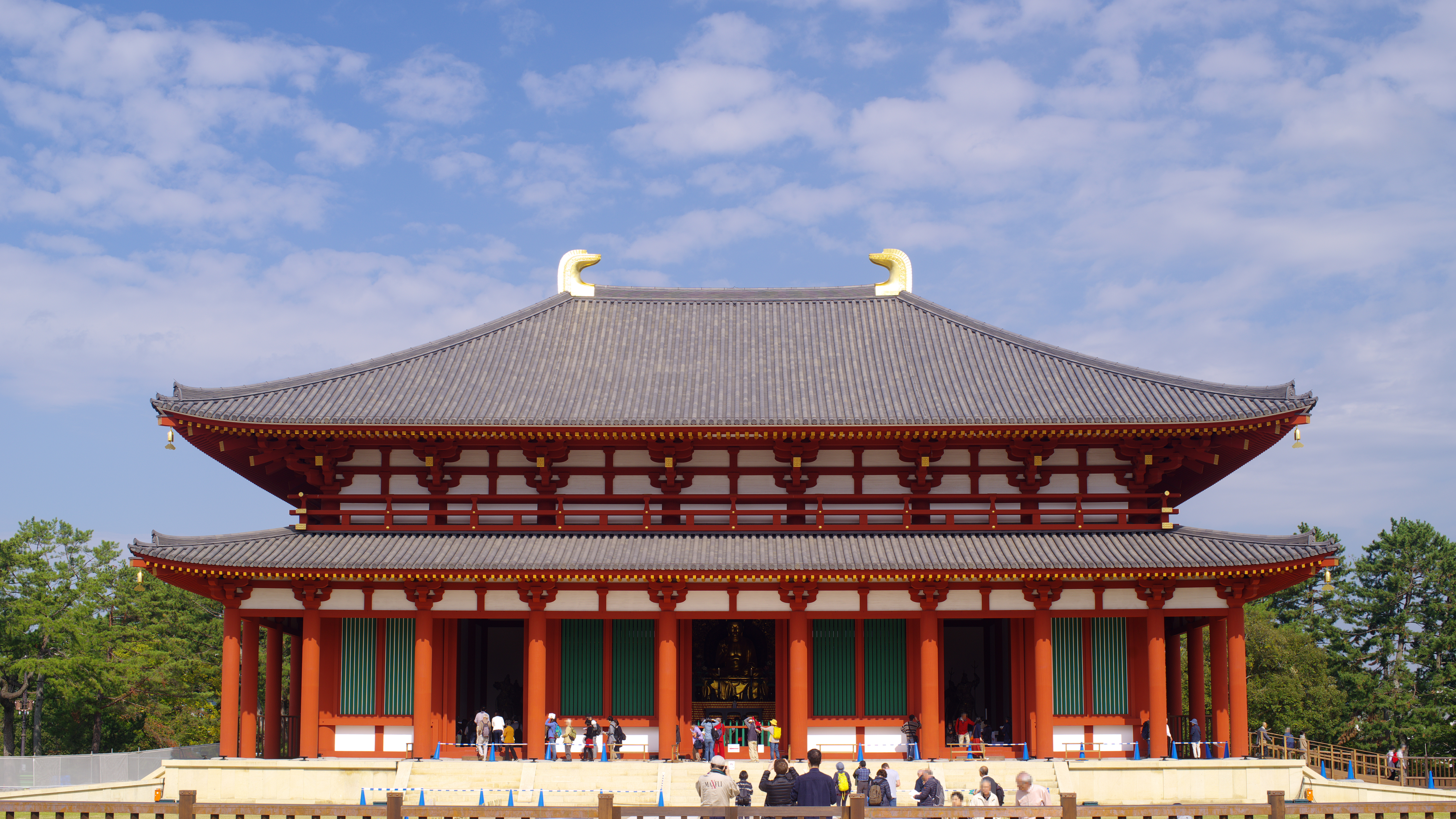
Kōfuku-ji, Buddhism temple

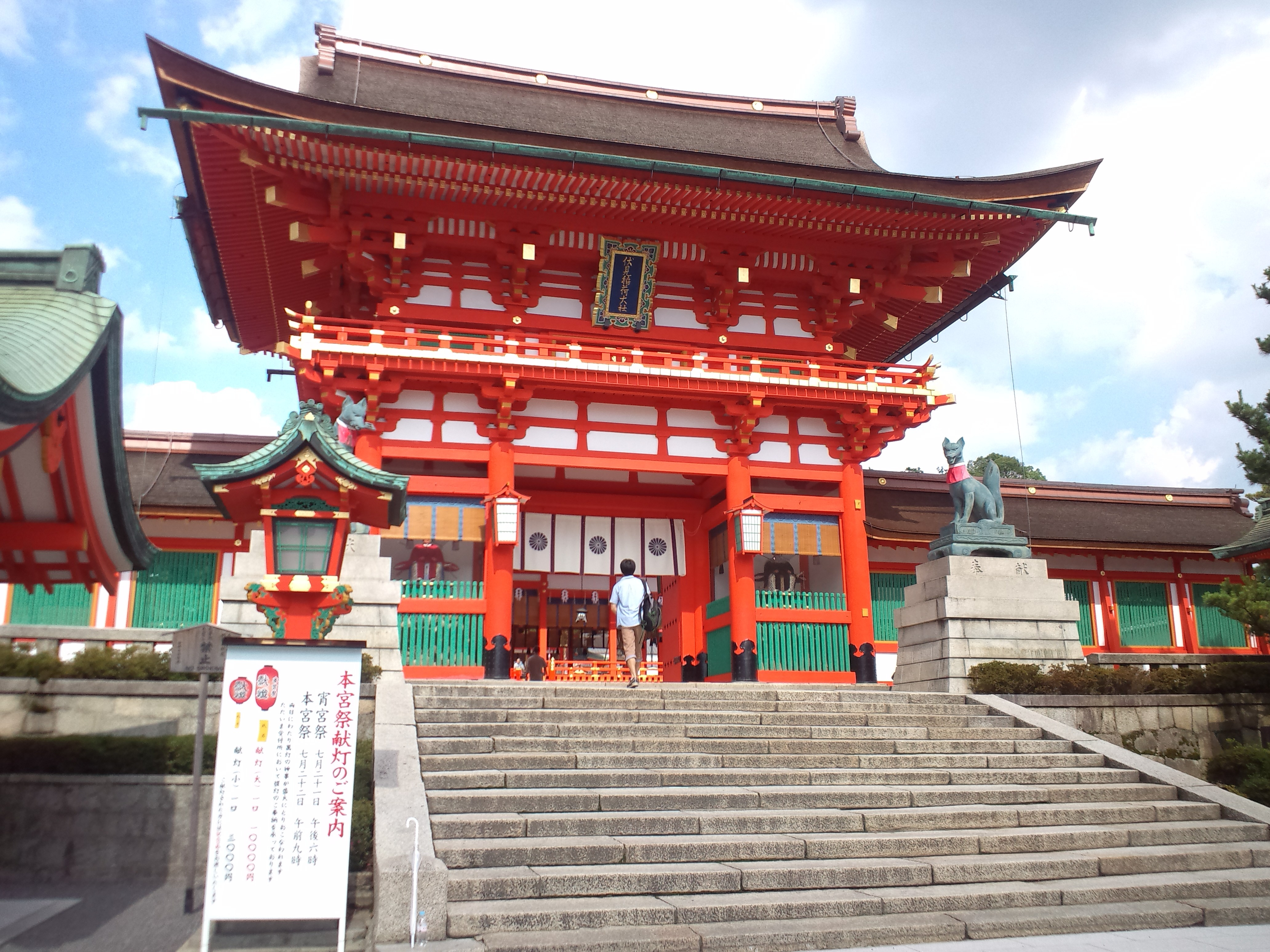
Fushimi Inari-taisha, Shintoism shrine

- In Japanese Buddhism and Shintoism, many temples and shrines have been painted vermilion because mercury, the raw material of vermilion, functions as an Preservative and because vermilion was thought to ward off evil.

=== Mythology ===
- In Han China's Five Elements cosmology (cf. Chinese mythology), one of the four symbols of the four directions is a bird called Vermilion Bird, which represents the direction of south. The color red (particularly as exemplified by cinnabar/vermilion) was also symbolically associated with summer, fire, a certain note on the musical scale, a certain day of the calendar, etc.

=== Literature ===
- Vermilion Sands is a collection of science-fiction short stories by J. G. Ballard published in 1971 about an imaginary future resort that pleases its guests by using various kinds of futuristic technology.
- Manfred, a short dramatic poem by Lord Byron: "...With the azure and vermillion / which is mixed for my pavilion"

=== Music ===
"Vermilion" is a two-part song by American metal band Slipknot released in 2004. According to vocalist Corey Taylor: "For some reason, as soon as I heard it, all I could see was the colour red.".

The Dutch singer Simone Simons released her debut solo album called Vermillion in 2024. On this album the word vermillion was used for one of the song titles called "Vermillion Dreams".

=== Video games ===
- Vermilion City is one of the locations used in the English-translated versions of the Pokémon video games and anime. It is a port town in the Kanto area, and the name is derived from the original Japanese name クチバシティ (Kuchiba City). Kuchiba is an orange-red color associated with sunsets and autumnal leaves and "Vermilion" was used as an approximate translation.

== Variations ==
=== Red-orange ===
Red-Orange

Color coordinates
- Hex triplet: #FF5349
- sRGB^{B} (r, g, b): (255, 83, 73)
- HSV (h, s, v): (3°, 71%, 100%)
- CIELCh_{uv} (L, C, h): (60, 138, 14°)
- Source: Crayola
- ISCC–NBS descriptor: Vivid red
- B: Normalized to [0–255] (byte)

The Crayola color red-orange has been a Crayola color since 1930.

=== Orange-red ===
Orange-Red

Color coordinates
- Hex triplet: #FF4500
- sRGB^{B} (r, g, b): (255, 69, 0)
- HSV (h, s, v): (16°, 100%, 100%)
- CIELCh_{uv} (L, C, h): (58, 158, 17°)
- Source: X11
- ISCC–NBS descriptor: Vivid reddish orange
- B: Normalized to [0–255] (byte)

The web color orange-red was formulated in 1987 as one of the X11 colors, which became known as the X11 web colors after the invention of the World Wide Web in 1991.

=== Medium vermilion ===
Medium Vermilion

Color coordinates
- Hex triplet: #D9603B
- sRGB^{B} (r, g, b): (217, 96, 59)
- HSV (h, s, v): (14°, 73%, 85%)
- CIELCh_{uv} (L, C, h): (56, 103, 21°)
- Source: Plochere
- ISCC–NBS descriptor: Strong reddish orange
- B: Normalized to [0–255] (byte)

This color is the medium tone of vermilion called vermilion on the Plochere color list, which was formulated in 1948 and is used widely by interior designers.

=== Chinese red ===
Chinese Red

Color coordinates
- Hex triplet: #AA381E
- sRGB^{B} (r, g, b): (170, 56, 30)
- HSV (h, s, v): (11°, 82%, 67%)
- CIELCh_{uv} (L, C, h): (40, 94, 17°)
- Source: ISCC-NBS
- ISCC–NBS descriptor: Deep reddish orange
- B: Normalized to [0–255] (byte)

Chinese red or China red is the name used for the vermilion shade used in Chinese lacquerware. The shade of the color can vary from dark to light depending upon how the pigment is made and how the lacquer was applied. Chinese red was originally made from the powdered mineral cinnabar, but beginning in about the 8th century it was made more commonly by a chemical process combining mercury and sulfur. Vermilion has significance in Taoist culture, and is regarded as the color of life and eternity.

"Chinese red" appears in English in 1924.

== See also ==
- Red
  - Scarlet (color)
  - Persian red ("artificial vermilion")
- List of colors
- Red pigments
- List of inorganic pigments
- Kumkuma
