= Pakal (disambiguation) =

Kʼinich Janaabʼ Pakal (603–683) was ajaw of the Maya city-state of Palenque in the Late Classic period of pre-Columbian Mesoamerican chronology.

Pakal may also refer to:

== Items relating to the Maya ==
Pakal (also spelled Pacal; meaning "shield" in several Mayan languages) forms the (common) name or part of the full name of several pre-Columbian Maya personages identified in the monumental inscriptions of sites in the Maya region of Mesoamerica. As such this may also refer to:

At Palenque:

- Janahb Pakal (died 612), a.k.a. Janaab' Pakal; Pakal "the Elder", nobleman of Palenque
- Kʼinich Janaab Pakal II (fl. c. 742), a.k.a. Upakal K'inich; U Pakal K'inich, 15th ruler
- Janaab Pakal III (fl. c. 799), a.k.a. 6 Kimi Pakal, Janaab' Pakal III; 18th and last known named ruler.

At Chichen Itza:

- Kʼakʼupakal (fl. 9th century), a.k.a. K'ak' Upakal; mid to late 9th century ruler at Chichen Itza

At Yaxchilan:

- Lady Pacal (died 705) of Yaxchilan

== Places in Iran ==
- Pakal, Fars
- Pakal, Markazi

== Other uses ==
- Pakal (film), a 2006 Indian Malayalam-language film
- Pakal Dul Dam, proposed in India
- Pakal Nakshatrangal, a 2008 Indian Malayalam-language film by Rajeev Nath
