= Pacal =

Pacal may refer to:

- Pacal (genus), a genus of arachnid, belonging to order of schizomids (shorttailed whipscorpions), endemic to Mexico
- K'inich Janaab' Pakal AKA Pacal the Great, 7th-century ruler of the pre-Columbian Maya site of Palenque, in what is now Chiapas, Mexico
- Pacal, a Hungarian stewed tripe and onions (pacalpörkölt), see pörkölt
- Pachal, a Coahuiltecan tribe sometimes spelled Pacal

== See also ==
- Pakal (disambiguation)
