= Kʼinich Kʼukʼ Bahlam II =

- Ajaw

King of Palenque
- Reign: 4 March 764 – c. 783
- Predecessor: Kʼinich Kan Bahlam III
- Successor: Janaab Pakal III
- Born: Palenque
- Died: c.783 Palenque
- Father: Kʼinich Ahkal Moʼ Nahb III
- Mother: Lady Men Nik
- Religion: Maya religion

Kʼinich Kʼukʼ Bahlam II, (Note: The ruler's name, when transcribed is KʼINICH-KʼUK[Bahlam]-ma, translated "Radiant Quetzal Jaguar".) also known as Bahlum Kʼukʼ II and Mahkʼina Kuk (fl. c. 764–783), was an ajaw of the Maya city of Palenque. He acceded to the throne on March 4, 764 and ruled until c. 783. (Note: These are the dates indicated on the Maya inscriptions in Mesoamerican Long Count calendar, Acceded: 9.16.13.0.7 9 Manikʼ 15 Wo.) He was a son of Kʼinich Ahkal Moʼ Nahb III and Lady Men Nik. Knowledge of him is limited to a few broken monuments: the Tablet of the 96 glyphs, the Creation Tablet, the House B Mural? and Bodega no. 218.

== Sources ==
Regnal titles
Preceded by Kʼinich Kan Bahlam III	Ajaw of Palenque; March 4, 764 – c.783	Succeeded by Janaab Pakal III
