= Kʼinich Kan Bahlam III =

- Ajaw

King of Palenque
- Reign: c.751
- Predecessor: Kʼinich Janaab Pakal II
- Successor: Kʼinich Kʼukʼ Bahlam II
- Religion: Maya religion

Kʼinich Kan Bahlam III, (Note: The ruler's name, when transcribed is KʼINICH-ka-KAN[Bahlam], translated "Radiant Jaguar Snake".) (fl. c.751), was an ajaw of the Maya city of Palenque. He ruled c.751. Ruler is not mentioned in any monument at Palenque but only one text at Pomona, that suggest his reign was short or troubled.

== Sources ==
Regnal titles
Preceded by Kʼinich Janaab Pakal II	Ajaw of Palenque c.751	Succeeded by Kʼinich Kʼukʼ Bahlam II
