= Tomb of the Red Queen =

Tomb of an elite Maya woman

Coordinates: 17.4837°N 92.0473°W

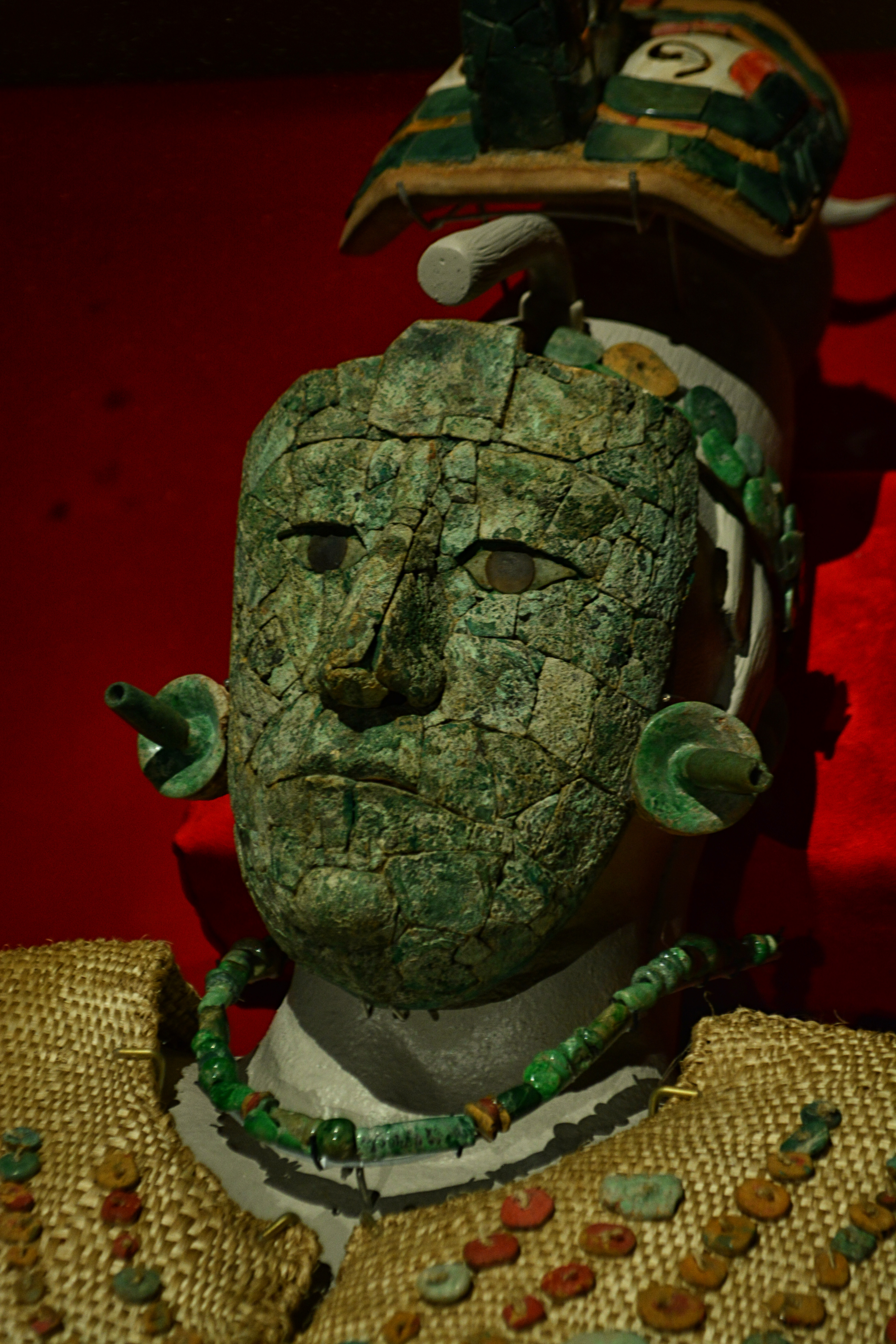
Funerary mask, ornaments and headdress of the Red Queen.

The Tomb of the Red Queen is a burial chamber containing the remains of a noblewoman, perhaps Lady Ix Tz'akbu Ajaw, and two servants, located inside Temple XIII in the ruins of the ancient Maya city of Palenque, now the Palenque National Park, in the southern Mexican state of Chiapas. It has been dated to between 600 and 700 AD.

The tomb was discovered in 1994 by the Mexican archeologist Fanny Lopez Jimenez after being commissioned to perform routine stabilization work on a set of temple stairs by the local archaeologist Arnoldo González Cruz. It takes its popular name from the fact that the remains of the noblewoman and the objects in the sarcophagus were covered with bright red cinnabar powder when the tomb was discovered.

== Temple XIII ==
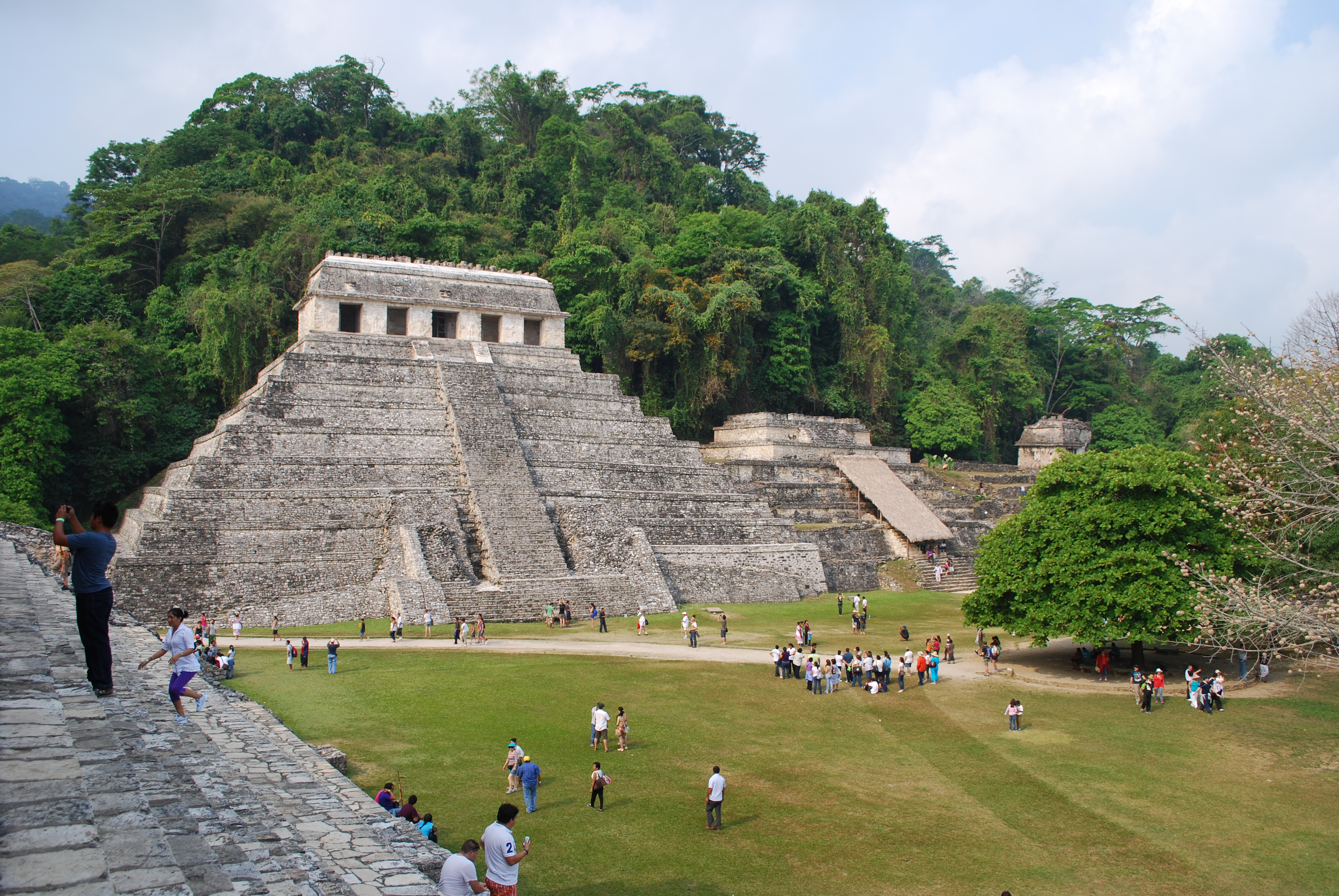
The Pyramid of the Inscriptions is in the foreground, the smaller Temple XIII is just next to it to the right.

Palenque was one of the wealthiest and most powerful of the Maya city states in Pre-Columbian Mexico. It was located in the foothills of the Chiapas mountains, on a site where several rivers come together, with waterfalls and pools; the name of the site in modern Mayan is Lakam Ha, or "big water". The site was first occupied in the early Classical Period (200-600 AD) and fell in about 800 AD. The city went into a decline and was gradually abandoned and reclaimed by the jungle.

Spanish explorers first visited the site in 1773 and 1784, and a Spanish military expedition was sent to the city in 1786; they broke down walls searching for treasure, but did not find the royal tombs. Several explorers visited the city in the 19th century, making drawings and publishing reports about the ruins. In 1948, archeologist Alberto Ruz Lhuillier discovered the hidden entrance to the Pyramid of the Inscriptions, and four years later he opened the tomb of Pakal, with its treasures, but Temple XIII remained unexplored for decades.

The ruins of Palenque cover an area of about a square mile, with hundreds of structures. In the center of the city are a large palace and a group of three pyramids, located on the Great Plaza, or main square. The largest pyramid, the Pyramid of the Inscriptions, was constructed especially for the remains of Pakal or Pakal the Great, who ruled from 615 AD until 683 AD, the period of the city's greatest glory. An internal stairway with a concealed entrance on the side of the pyramid led down to the burial chamber beneath the pyramid. Next to it are two smaller but similar pyramids. Temple XIII is next to the Pyramid of the Inscriptions, and much smaller in size. It is about twelve meters high, built in steps, with an external stairway leading to the top. An internal stairway led into the center of the pyramid, but it had completely collapsed and was blocked by debris. In 1973 the archeologist Jorge Acosta explored the first two levels of Temple XIII, but did not find the entrance to the burial chamber.

== The discovery ==
In the spring of 1994, a young Mexican archaeologist named Fanny López Jiménez was performing routine stabilization work on a temple adjacent to the Temple of the Inscriptions. López Jiménez noted a small crack on the stairs, partially covered by masonry and some weeds. Using her flashlight and a mirror, she peered into a narrow passageway hidden by the stairs, that seemed to connect to a sealed door. She immediately notified the team leader, Arnoldo Gonzales Cruz, of her discovery.

The next day the archaeology team working for the National Institute of Anthropology and History of Mexico, began to explore what López Jiménez had uncovered. They located a small blocked door on a vertical section on the second level of the pyramid, about 2.8 meters above the level of the Plaza. The team removed the masonry and found a narrow corridor six meters long, blocked by debris, leading into the pyramid. That corridor led to another corridor, fifteen meters long, made of large limestone blocks, which ran from north to south inside the pyramid. This corridor was free of debris. There were three chambers on the south side of the corridor; two were open and empty, with signs of rituals performed in front, but the third was blocked by a stone wall covered with stucco, and traces of pigment.

The team headed by Cruz was extremely curious to know what was inside, but they did not tear down the wall right away, fearing to damage any decoration on the inside of the wall. After deliberation, they made a small hole fifteen centimeters by fifteen centimeters, and peered inside. They saw a sarcophagus and what appeared to be a perfectly intact tomb.

== The burial chamber ==
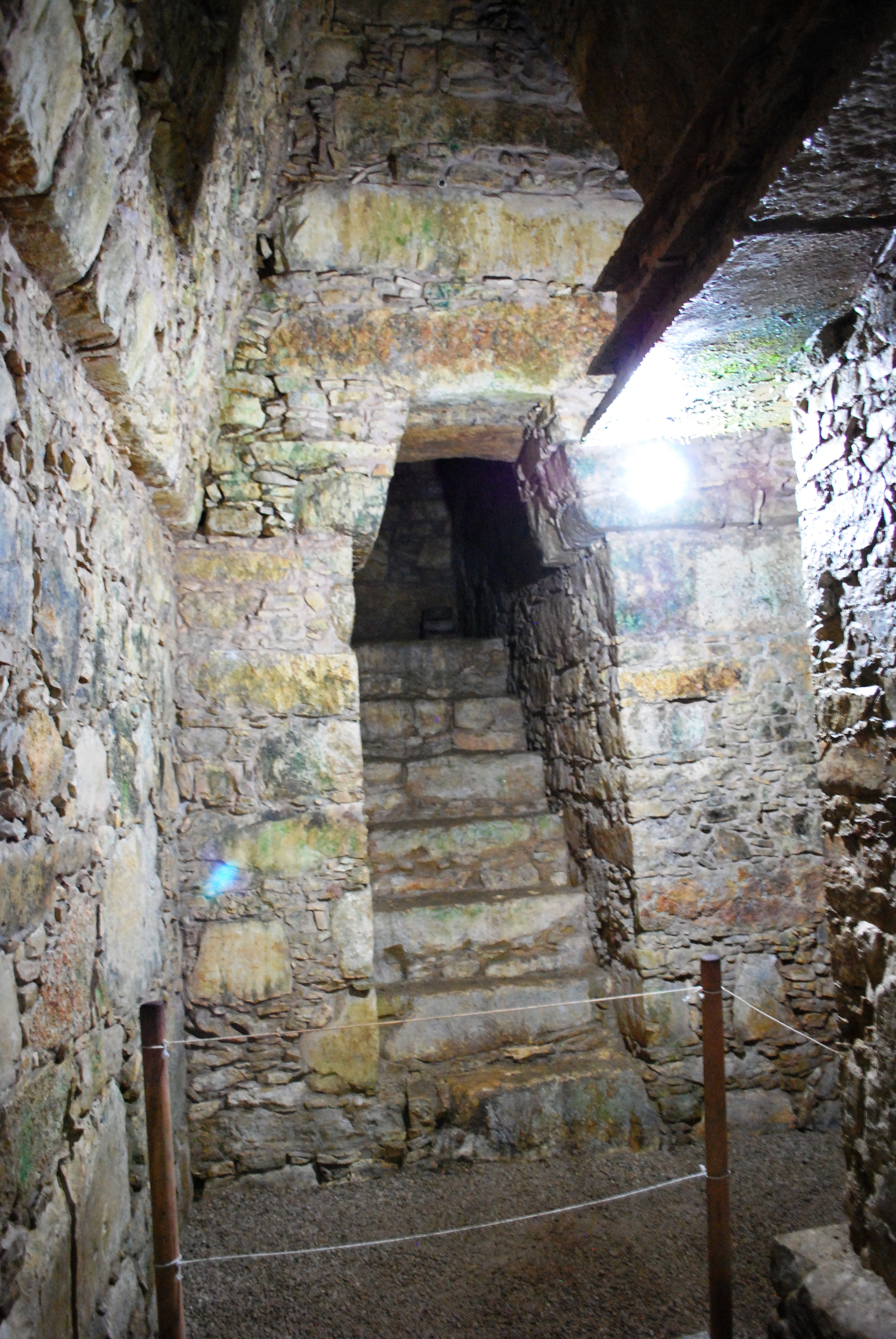
The burial chamber and the stairway leading into it.

The chamber was 3.8 meters long and 2.5 meters wide, with a vaulted stone ceiling. There were no decorations or paintings on the walls. In the center, occupying almost all of the burial chamber, was a limestone sarcophagus 2.4 meters long and 1.8 meters wide, closed by a stone lid ten centimeters thick. Atop the lid was a censer with a lid and a small spindle whorl.

At the western end of the sarcophagus, a badly preserved skeleton of a male about eleven years old was found lying on the floor. He was apparently a servant who had been sacrificed in order to accompany the Red Queen on her final voyage.

At the eastern end of the sarcophagus was a second skeleton of a woman 30–35 years old, who had also apparently been sacrificed.

On the first step leading to the chamber was a large brown ceramic plate and two orange ceramic vases, as well as some human remains consisting of long bones and teeth inlaid with jade.

== The sarcophagus ==
The archeologists carefully lifted the lid of the sarcophagus by twenty centimeters, a laborious process which took fourteen hours. Inside they found the remains of a woman lying on her back. Her skeleton was covered and surrounded by a large collection of jade and pearl objects, bone needles and shells, which were originally pieces of necklaces, earspools and wristlets. Around the skull was a diadem made of flat circular jade beads, and the malachite pieces of what had been a funeral mask. In the chest area of the skeleton were more flat jade beads and four obsidian blades. In addition, there was a tiny limestone figurine inside a seashell.

The skeleton, the collection of objects and the inside of the sarcophagus were entirely covered with a bright red dust made of cinnabar, or the ground ore of mercury.

== The identity of the Red Queen ==
The remains of the "Red Queen" and the objects in the tomb were taken to the laboratory of Mexican National Institute of Archeology and History for further study. The tomb was dated to between 600 and 700 AD by a comparison of the ceramic pottery with that found at other Maya sites. The scientists conducted carbon-14 tests and facial reconstructions studies, and successfully extracted a sample of DNA from the collagen in her vertebrae. They were able to establish that she was about sixty years old when she died, and that she had a severe case of osteoporosis that stiffened her bones. They established that she consumed a large amount of meat in her diet, and had remarkably healthy teeth considering her age and the time in which she lived. There are no inscriptions in the burial chamber of other texts to establish with certainty who she was.

It was certain that she was a person of importance. The pyramid where her burial chamber was located was next to that of Pakal the Great, and objects in the tomb - the funeral mask, diadem and other objects in the sarcophagus - were similar to those found in the tomb of Pakal. When the tomb was discovered it was suggested that she was the mother of Pakal, an important figure who had been co-ruler of the state for a time, but the DNA tests showed that the Red Queen did not have common DNA with Pakal. The current theory (August 2013) is that she was Ix Tz'akbu Ajaw, the wife of Pakal. Arnoldo Gonzalez Cruz and his team hope to find the tombs of the sons of Pakal in the yet-unexplored other temples of Palenque, which, if their DNA is intact, could confirm her identity. Her remains were returned to Palenque in June 2012, and buried in a different location, since the humidity inside the pyramid did not allow returning her remains to the sarcophagus. The mystery of her identity remains unresolved.
