= Kʼinich Janaab Pakal II =

- Ajaw
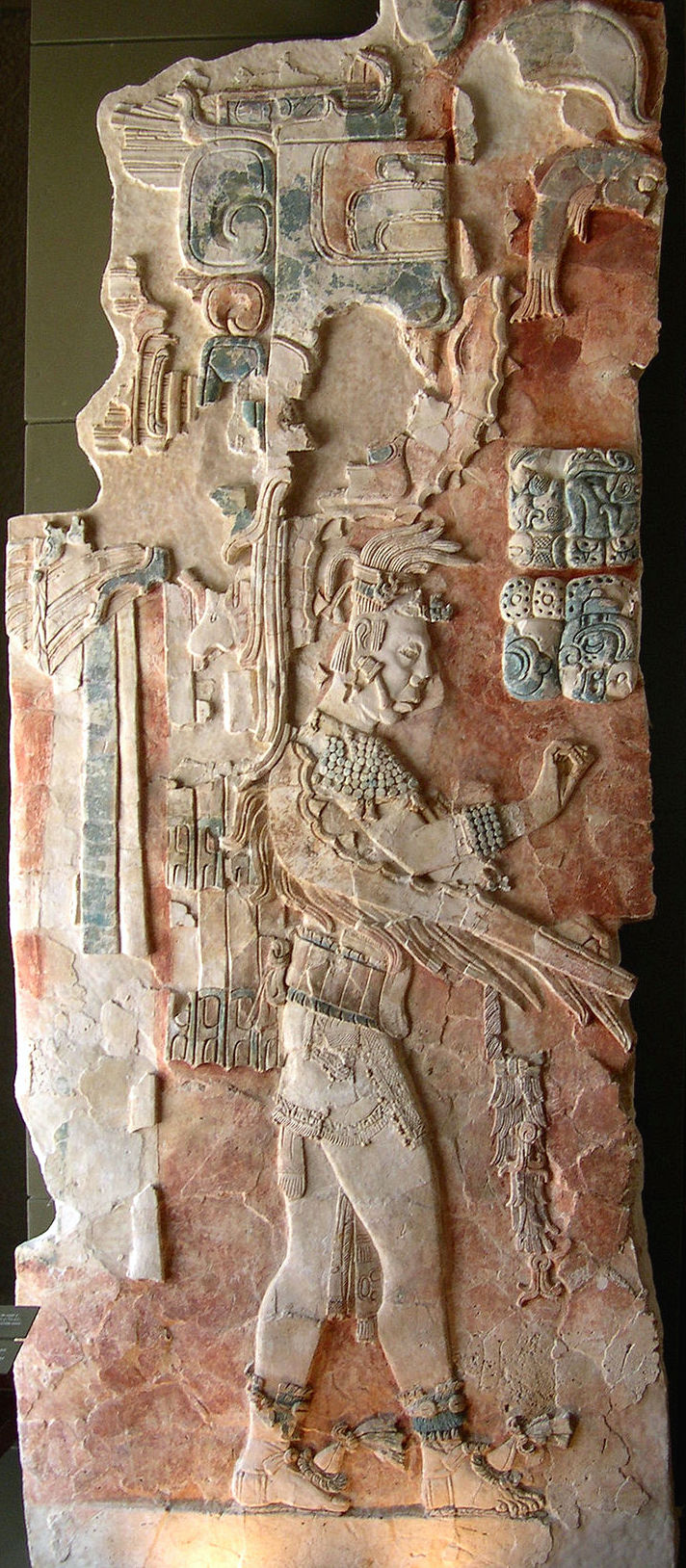
- Kʼinich Janaab Pakal II on a painted stucco relief from Palenque

King of Palenque
- Reign: c.742
- Predecessor: Kʼinich Ahkal Moʼ Nahb III
- Successor: Kʼinich Kan Bahlam III
- Born: Palenque
- Died: Palenque
- Father: Tiwol Chan Mat
- Mother: Lady Kinuw
- Religion: Maya religion

Kʼinich Janaab Pakal II, (Note: The ruler's name, when transcribed is u-PAKAL-la-KʼINICH (KʼINICH-) JANA꞉B-pa-ka-la, translated "Shield of the Sun God Radiant ?-Shield".) also known as Upakal Kʼinich, (fl. c.742), was an ajaw of the Maya city of Palenque. He ruled c.742 and he was probably brother of Kʼinich Ahkal Moʼ Nahb III. There are only few details about his reign like Bodega no. 1144 and portraits on a stucco-covered pier from Temple 19, only date from his reign is from 742, when he installed lord into important office.

== Sources ==
Regnal titles
Preceded by Kʼinich Ahkal Moʼ Nahb III	Ajaw of Palenque c.742	Succeeded by Kʼinich Kan Bahlam III
