= Kʼinich Ahkal Moʼ Nahb III =

Ajaw of Palenque 721 to 736

- Ajaw
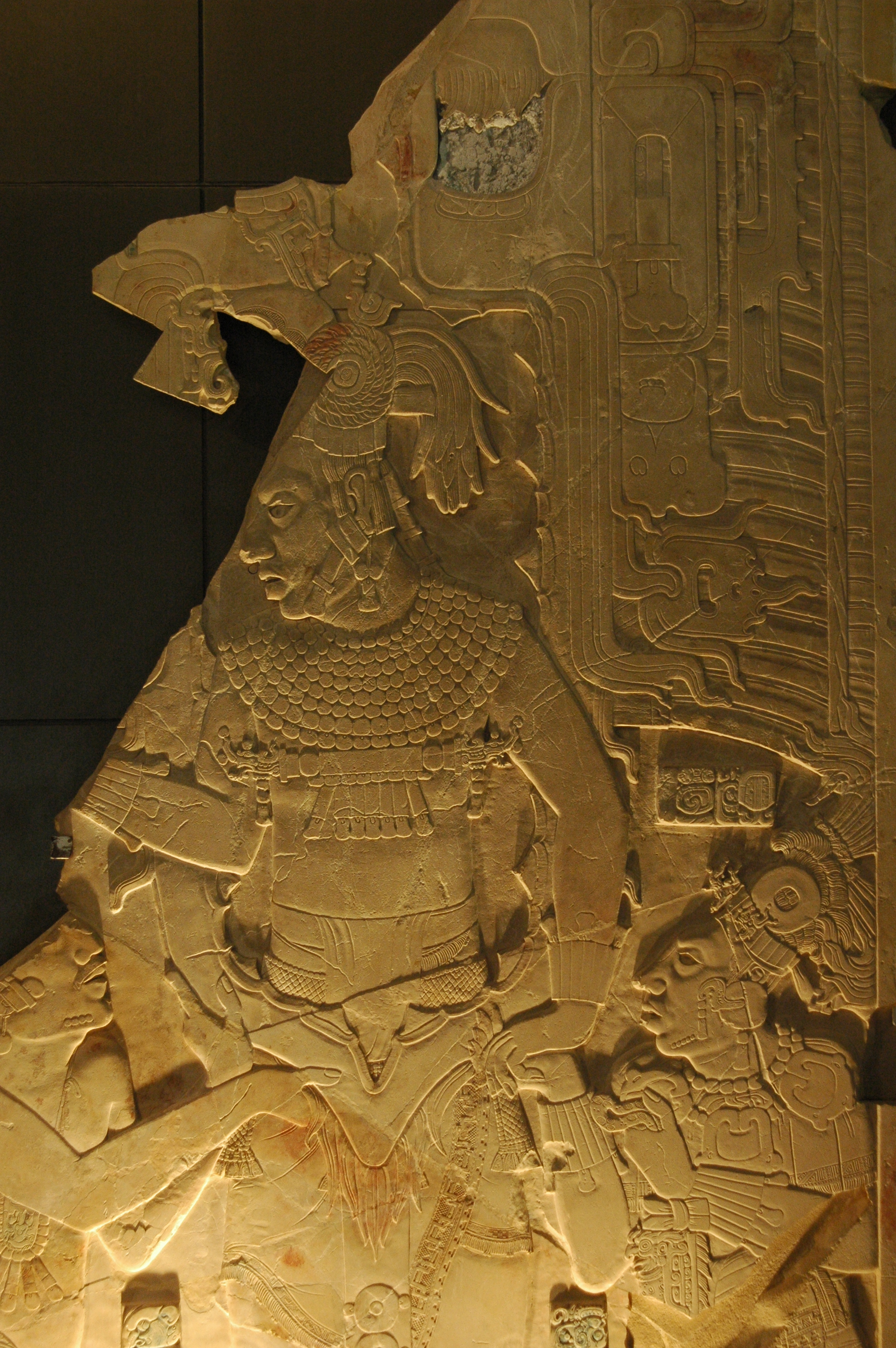
- Kʼinich Ahkal Moʼ Nahb III on tablet from Temple XIX with two kneeling nobles

King of Palenque
- Reign: 30 December 721 – 736
- Predecessor: K'inich K'an Joy Chitam II
- Successor: Kʼinich Janaab Pakal II
- Born: 13 September 678; Palenque
- Died: 736 (aged 57–58); Palenque
- Spouse: Lady Men Nik
- Issue: Kʼinich Kʼukʼ Bahlam II; Lady Yax Ahau Xoc, Queen of Tikal
- Father: Tiwol Chan Mat
- Mother: Lady Kinuw
- Religion: Maya religion

Kʼinich Ahkal Moʼ Nahb III, (Note: The ruler's name, when transcribed is KʼINICH-AHK-AL MOʼ[NAHB], translated "Radiant Turtle Macaw Lake?".) also known as Chaacal III and Akul Anab III (13 September 678–c. 736), was an ajaw of the Maya city of Palenque. He took the throne on 30 December 721, reigning until c. 736. (Note: These are the dates indicated on the Maya inscriptions in Mesoamerican Long Count calendar, Born: 9.12.6.5.8 3 Lamat 6 Sak and Acceded: 9.14.10.4.2 9 Ikʼ 5 Kayab.)

== Biography ==
Ahkal Moʼ Nahb was born to nobleman Tiwol Chan Mat and Lady Kinuw. His probable brother was Kʼinich Janaab Pakal II. He was married to Lady Men Nik and was succeeded by his son ajaw Kʼinich Kʼukʼ Bahlam II. Ahkal Moʼ Nahb III was born in 678, during the reign of his grandfather, Palenque's long-lived ruler Kʼinich Janaab Pakal I, often referred to as "Pakal the Great", because this ruler righted a kingdom that had been destabilized by enemy attacks and oversaw a building program that culminated in the Temple of the Inscriptions. His construction program rivaled that of his predecessors, in the newly discovered inscriptions of Temple XIX he contributed enormously to the surviving records of Palenque history. The monuments and text associated with Ahkal Moʼ Nahb III are: Temple XVIII texts, Temple XIX bench and texts, Temple XXI texts, Tablets of the Orator and Scribe, Bundle Panel and House E Painted text?.

== Sources ==
Regnal titles
Preceded by Kʼinich Kʼan Joy Chitam II	Ajaw of Palenque; 30 December 721 – c.736	Succeeded by Kʼinich Janaab Pakal II
