= Janaab Pakal III =

- Ajaw

King of Palenque
- Reign: 17 November 799 – ?
- Predecessor: K'inich K'uk' Bahlam II
- Successor: None
- Religion: Maya religion

Janaab Pakal III, (Note: The ruler's name, when transcribed is 6-? ja-na-bi pa-ka-la, translated "6 Death ? Shield".) also known as 6 Cimi Pakal, (fl. c.799), was an ajaw of the Maya city of Palenque. He acceded to the throne in November, 799. (Note: These are the dates indicated on the Maya inscriptions in Mesoamerican Long Count calendar, Acceded: 9.18.9.4.4 7 K'an 17 Muwan.) Janaab was probably last ruler of Palenque and his glyph name comes from blackware vase found in the residential quarter of city.

== Sources ==
Regnal titles
Preceded by K'inich K'uk' Bahlam II	Ajaw of Palenque; November 13, 799-?	Succeeded by none
