= Fanny López Jiménez =

Mexican archaeologist

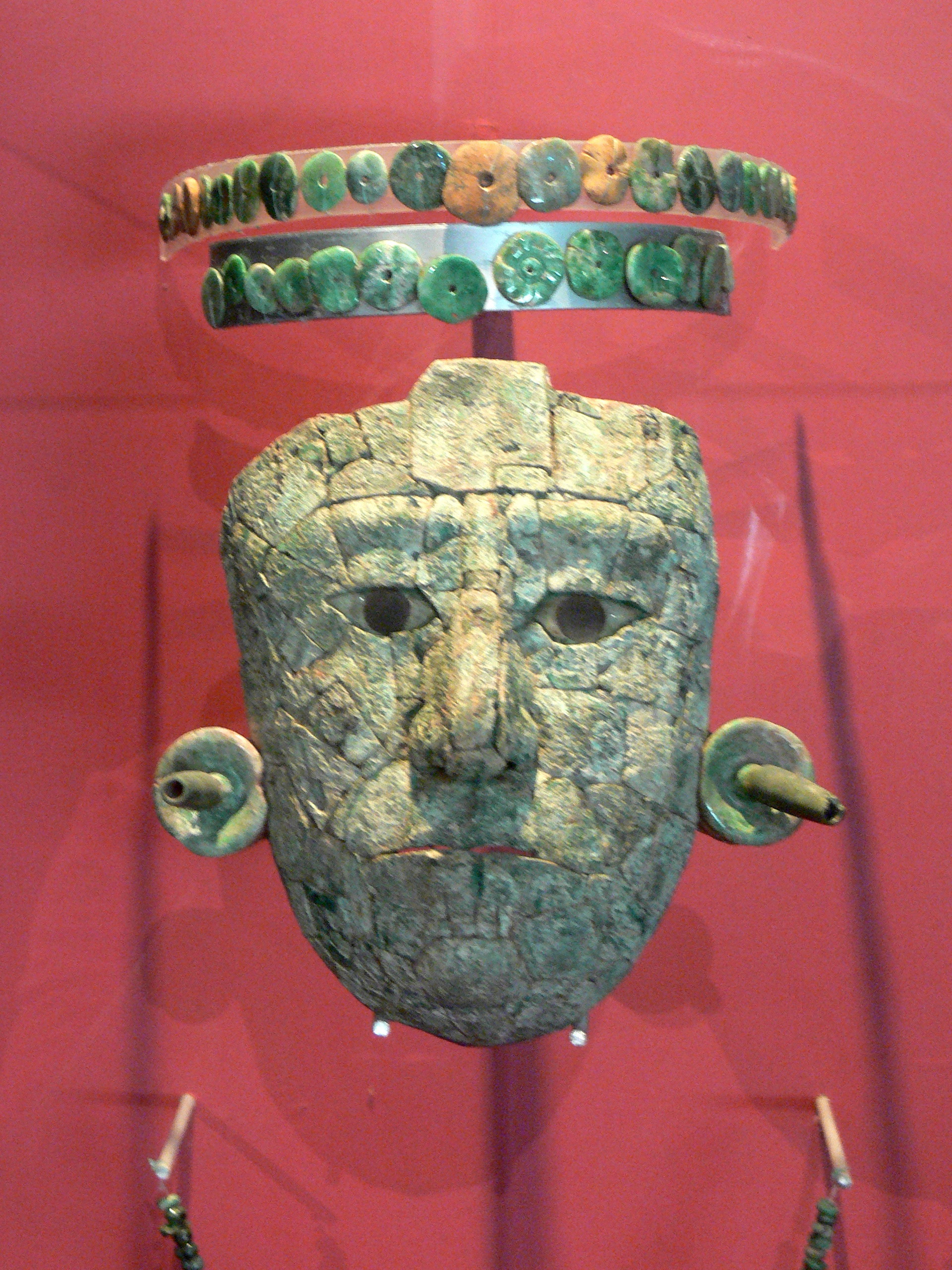
The mask of the Red Queen.

Fanny López Jiménez (born Tuxtla Gutiérrez, Chiapas, 1970) is a Mexican archaeologist known for her excavations at Palenque, including the discovery of the Tomb of the Red Queen.

López Jiménez studied archaeology at the National School of Anthropology and History in Mexico City. She completed her first fieldwork in Lagartero near Comitán and shortly after, in 1991, performed excavation practices in Palenque, on the north side El Palacio. The remains of the Red Queen were found on 11 April 1994 in the Temple XIII internal substructure. After further research it was López Jiménez who proposed that the identity of the formerly unknown woman was Hun K'Anleum, "Señora 1 Telaraña" ("Lady 1 Cobweb") in her article "Quién es la Reina Roja?" (Who is the Red Queen?) in Arqueología Mexicana.

López Jiménez is married to Hector Escobar.
